= Battle of France order of battle =

The order of battle for the Battle of France details the hierarchy of the major combatant forces in the Battle of France in May 1940.

== Comparative ranks ==
French	British	German
Général d'armée	General	Generaloberst
Général de corps d'armée	Lieutenant-General	General der Infanterie/Kavallerie/Artillerie/Pioniere (branch specific)
Général de division	Major-General	Generalleutnant
Général de brigade	Brigadier	Generalmajor (lowest German general rank)
Colonel	Colonel	Oberst

== Allies ==
The bulk of the forces of the Allies were French, although the United Kingdom (British Expeditionary Force), Netherlands, and Belgium had significant forces in the battle opposing Germany. Supreme Command was held by the French Commander-in-Chief Général d'armée Maurice Gamelin, his deputy Général d'armée Alphonse Joseph Georges was appointed Commander of the North Western Front.

=== Army Group 1 (France) ===
Army Group 1 guarded the north-east frontier of France, ready to move into Belgium and the Netherlands to oppose any German invasion of those nations. The First controlled four French armies as well as the Belgian Army and the British Expeditionary Force. Général d'armée Gaston Billotte was Commander-in-Chief until his death in a car crash on 23 May 1940, Général d'armée Georges Maurice Jean Blanchard was appointed to succeed him.

- First Army – Général d'armée Georges Maurice Jean Blanchard
  - Cavalry Corps – Général de corps d'armée René Prioux (vs. Hoeppner's XVI Pz Corps @ Hannut)
    - 2nd Light Mechanized Division – Général de brigade Gabriel-Marie-Joseph Bougrain (vs. Hoeppner Corps)
    - 3rd Light Mechanized Division – Général de brigade Jean-Léon-Albert Langlois
  - 3rd Corps – General de Fornel de la Laurencie
    - 1st Motorized Infantry Division
    - 1st Moroccan Infantry Division
    - 2nd North African Infantry Division
  - 4th Corps – Général de division Aymes
    - 32nd Infantry Division
    - 15th Motorized Infantry Division – Général de brigade Alphonse Juin
  - 5th Corps – Général de corps d'armée René Altmayer
    - 5th North African Infantry Division
    - 101st Infantry Division
  - Belgian VII Corps
    - 2nd Chasseurs Ardennais – Général de brigade Maurice-Colombe-Louis Keyaerts (at Chabrehez and Houx vs. 7th Pz Div)
    - 8th Infantry Division
- Second Army – Général d'armée Charles Huntziger
  - Directly reporting: (dispositions north to south)
    - 5th Light Cavalry Division – Général de brigade Marie-Jacques-Henri Chanoine (to Neufchateau-Bastogne, vs Guderian 1st and 2nd Pz, evacuated Sedan)
    - 2nd Light Cavalry Division (to Habay La Neuve, Arlon Gap, vs 10th Pz Div)
    - 1st Cavalry Brigade
  - Directly reporting: (Reserves)
    - 4th Tank Battalion
    - 7th Tank Battalion
    - 205th Inf Regt
    - 213th Inf Regt – Lt Colonel Labarthé
  - 10th Corps – Général de corps d'armée Pierre-Paul-Jacques Grandsard
    - 55th Infantry Division – Général de brigade Henri-Jean LaFontaine (Donchery and La Marfee on the Meuse, vs Guderian, 1st, 2nd Pz Divs.)
    - 71st Infantry Division – Général de brigade Joseph-Antoine-Jacques-Louis Baudet (Wadelincourt on the Meuse and Raucourt, vs Guderian's 10th Pz Div)
    - 3rd North African Infantry Division (South of 71st Div)
  - 18th Corps – Général de division Paul-André Doyen
    - 1st Colonial Infantry Division
    - 3rd Colonial Infantry Division
    - 41st Infantry Division
- Seventh Army – Général d'armée Henri Giraud
  - Directly reporting:
    - 21st Infantry Division
    - 60th Infantry Division
    - 68th Infantry Division
  - 1st Corps
    - 1st Light Mechanized Division
    - 25th Motorized Division – Général de division Molinié
  - 16th Corps
    - 9th Motorized Division
- Ninth Army – Général d'armée André Corap
  - Directly reporting:
    - 4th North African Infantry Division – Général de division Charles-Èugene Sancelme (at Onhaye, vs 7th Pz Div)
    - 53rd Infantry Division – Général de brigade Jean-Marie-Léon Etchberrigaray (vs 2nd Pz)
  - 2nd Corps Général de corps d'armée Jean-Gabriel Bouffet
    - 4th Light Cavalry Division – Général de division Paul-Louis-Arthur Barbe (deployed into the Ardennes, across the Meuse to the Ourthe, then Marche, vs 7th Pz Div)
    - 5th Motorized Division – Général de brigade Jean-Noël-Louis Boucher (Haut-le-Wastia, vs 7th Pz)
  - 11th Corps – Général de corps d'armée Julien-Françoise-René Martin
    - 1st Light Cavalry Division
    - 18th Infantry Division – Général de division Camille-Léon Duffet (on the Meuse at Houx, vs 7th Pz Div)
      - 66th Regt
      - 77th Regt
      - 125th Regt
    - 22nd Infantry Division – Général de brigade Joseph-Louis-Françoise Hassler (Givet on the Meuse, vs 7th Pz Div)
  - 41st Corps – Général de corps d'armée Emmanuel-Urbain Libaud
    - 61st Infantry Division – Général de brigade Arsène-Marie Paul Vauthier (N of Monthermé vs 8 Pz Div)
    - 102nd Fortress Division – Général de division Françoise-Arthur Portzert (Monthermé, vs 6th Pz Div)
    - 3rd Spahi Brigade – Colonel Marc (La Horgne v 1st Pz)
- French Armored Reserves (near Rheims to SW of breakthrough area)
  - 1st Armored Division – Général de brigade Marie-Germain-Christian Bruneau (deployed to Charleroi then to Flavion, arrived low on fuel or out of fuel, vs 7 Pz Div and then 5th Pz Div)
  - 2nd Armored Division – Général de brigade Albert-Charles-Émile Bruché (to Signy, deployed piecemeal, destroyed by Reinhardt's XLI Pz Corps)
  - 3rd Armored Division – Général de brigade Georges-Louis Brocard (to west of Stonne, versus Grossdeutschland Regt, 10th Pz Div, dispersed, small detachment attacked Stonne but driven off)
  - 3rd Motorized Infantry Division – Général de brigade Paul-Jean-Léon Bertin-Bossu (to west of Stonne, dispersed, attacked Stonne but driven off)
  - 4th Armored Division – Général de brigade Charles de Gaulle
- British Expeditionary Force – General Lord Gort
  - Directly reporting:
    - 5th Infantry Division – Major-General Harold Franklyn
    - 12th Infantry Division – Major-General Roderic Loraine Petre
    - 23rd Infantry Division – Major-General William Norman Herbert
    - 46th Infantry Division – Major-General Henry Curtis
  - I Corps (UK) – Lieutenant-General Michael Barker succeeded by Major-General Harold Alexander
    - 1st Infantry Division – Major-General Harold Alexander
    - 2nd Infantry Division – Major-General Charles Loyd, succeeded by Brigadier Noel Irwin
    - 48th Infantry Division – Major-General Andrew Thorne
  - II Corps (UK) – Lieutenant-General Alan Brooke succeeded by Major-General Bernard Montgomery
    - 3rd Infantry Division – Major-General Bernard Montgomery, succeeded by Brigadier Kenneth Anderson
    - 4th Infantry Division – Major-General Dudley Johnson
    - 50th Infantry Division – Major-General Giffard Le Quesne Martel
  - III Corps (UK) – Lieutenant-General Ronald Adam
    - 42nd Infantry Division – Major-General William Holmes
    - 44th Infantry Division – Major-General Edmund Osborne

=== Belgian Army ===
The Belgian Army field approximately 600,000 personnel in 22 divisions, backed by 1,338 artillery pieces, 10 tanks and 240 other combat vehicles. King Leopold III of Belgium had assumed personal command of the army upon mobilization. His principal military advisor was Lieutenant-general Raoul Van Overstraeten, while General-major Oscar Michiels was Chief of the General Staff.

- I Corps – Lieutenant-general Alexis van der Veken
  - 4th Infantry Division
  - 7th Reserve Infantry Division
- II Corps – Lieutenant-general Victor Michem
  - 6th Infantry Division
  - 14th Reserve Infantry Division
- III Corps – Lieutenant-general Joseph de Krahe
  - 2nd Infantry Division
  - 3rd Infantry Division
- IV Corps – Lieutenant-general André Bogaerts
  - 12th Reserve Infantry Division
  - 15th Reserve Infantry Division
  - 18th Reserve Infantry Division
- V Corps – Lieutenant-general Edouard Van den Bergen
  - 13th Reserve Infantry Division
  - 17th Reserve Infantry Division
- VI Corps – Lieutenant-general Fernand Verstraete
  - 5th Infantry Division
  - 10th Reserve Infantry Division
- VII Corps – Lieutenant-general Georges Deffontaine
  - 8th Reserve Infantry Division
  - 2nd Chasseurs Ardennais Division
- Cavalry Corps – Lieutenant-general Maximilien de Neve de Roden
  - 1st Infantry Division
  - 14th Reserve Infantry Division
  - 2nd Cavalry Division
  - Group Ninitte
- Group K – Lieutenant-general Maurice Keyaerts
  - 1st Cavalry Division
  - 1st Chasseurs Ardennais Division
- General Reserve
  - 11th Reserve Infantry Division
  - 16th Reserve Infantry Division

=== Luxembourg Army ===
The Luxembourg army (the Corps des Gendarmes et Voluntaries) was made up of two companies. The first company, the Volunteer Corps, was Luxembourg's main army during the invasions. The second company was the Corps des Gendarmes Luxembourg's gendarmarie force.

- Corps des Gendarmes et Voluntaries – Émile Speller
  - Volunteer Corps – Captain Aloyse Jacoby
    - auxiliary unit
  - Corps des Gendarmes – Captain Maurice Stein

=== Army Group 2 (France) ===
Army Group 2 (France) was responsible for manning the bulk of the Maginot Line from Montmédy to south of Strasbourg, and controlled three armies. Général d'armée André-Gaston Prételat was Commander-in-Chief of the army group throughout its existence.

- Directly reporting to the Army Group:
  - 87th African Infantry Division
  - 4th Colonial Infantry Division
- Third Army – General Charles-Marie Condé
  - Directly reporting:
    - 3rd Light Cavalry Division – General Petiet
    - 6th Infantry Division – General Lucien
    - 6th North African Infantry Division – General de Verdilhac
    - 6th Colonial Infantry Division – General Carles
    - 7th Infantry Division
    - 8th Infantry Division
  - French Colonial Corps
    - 2nd Infantry Division – General Klopfenstein
    - British 51st (Highland) Infantry Division – Major-General Victor Fortune
    - 56th Infantry Division
  - 6th Corps
    - 26th Infantry Division
    - 42nd Infantry Division
  - 24th Corps – General Fougère
    - 51st Infantry Division – General Boell
  - 42nd Corps – General Sivot
    - 20th Infantry Division – General Corbe
    - 58th Infantry Division – General Perraud
- Fourth Army – General Edouard Réquin
  - Directly reporting:
    - Polish 1st Infantry Division – General Bronisław Duch
    - 45th Infantry division – General Roux
  - 9th Corps – General Laure
    - 11th Infantry Division – General Arlabosse
    - 47th Infantry Division – General Mendras
  - 20th Corps – General Hubert
    - 52nd Infantry Division
    - 82nd African Infantry Division
- Fifth Army – General Victor Bourret
  - Directly reporting:
    - 44th Infantry Division
  - 8th Corps
    - 24th Infantry Division
    - 31st Infantry Division
  - 12th Corps
    - 16th Infantry Division
    - 35th Infantry Division
    - 70th Infantry Division
  - 17th Corps
    - 62nd Infantry Division
    - 103rd Infantry Division
  - 43rd Corps
    - 30th Infantry Division

=== Army Group 3 (France) ===
Army Group 3 was responsible for manning the southern end of the Maginot Line, along the River Rhine and controlled one army. The army group's Commander-in-Chief was Général d'Armée Antoine-Marie-Benoit Besson.

- Eighth Army – General Marcel Garchery
  - 7th Corps
    - 13th Infantry Division
    - 27th Infantry Division
  - 13th Corps
    - 19th Infantry Division
    - 54th Infantry Division
    - 104th Fortress Division
    - 105th Fortress Division
  - 44th Corps
    - 67th Infantry Division
  - 45th Corps
    - 57th Infantry Division
    - 63rd Infantry Division
    - Polish Second Infantry Fusiliers Division – Brigadier-General Bronisław Prugar-Ketling

=== Royal Netherlands Army ===
The Netherlands had four corps, one motorized division and a defense division deployed to begin the battle. Total strength was 240,000 personnel, equipped with 676 artillery pieces and 32 armoured cars. Generaal Henri Winkelman was Supreme Commander of the Royal Netherlands Army and Navy.

- Field Army Command – Lieutenant-generaal Godfried van Voorst tot Voorst
  - II Corps – Generaal-majoor Jacob Harberts
    - 2nd Division
    - 4th Division
  - III Corps – Generaal-majoor Adrianus van Nijnatten
    - 5th Division
    - 6th Division
    - Light Division (Attached)
    - Peel Division (Attached)
  - IV Corps – Generaal-majoor Adrianus van den Bent
    - 7th Division
    - 8th Division
  - A, B, G Brigades
- I Corps – Generaal-majoor Nicolaas Carstens
  - 1st Division
  - 3rd Division

=== French army facing Italy ===
- Armee des Alps Commanded by Général d'Armée René Olry
- 3 infantry divisions of type B

14th Army Corps
15th Army Corps

  - Fortification sectors: Dauphiné, Savoie, Alpes Maritimes
  - Defence sectors: Rhône, Nice

Originally the French Sixth Army, the Army of the Alps was responsible for manning the southeast frontier with Italy. Overall, French forces in the region numbered about 35,000 soldiers.

=== French reserves ===
The French began the battle with three reserve corps positioned behind the army groups. The VII and XXIII Corps were stationed behind the 2nd and 3rd Army Groups.

The following divisions were also kept in reserve:

- 10th Infantry Division
- 14th Infantry Division
- 23rd Infantry Division
- 28th Infantry Division
- 29th Infantry Division
- 36th Infantry Division
- 43rd Infantry Division
- 1st North African Infantry Division
- 7th North African Infantry Division
- 5th Colonial Infantry Division
- 7th Colonial Infantry Division

== Axis ==
The commander-in-chief of the Oberkommando des Heeres (OKH) was Generaloberst Walter von Brauchitsch. Initially the Axis forces consisted of the forces of the German army. They were joined in the conflict by the Italian army on 10 June.

=== OKH Reserve ===
- Second Army – General der Kavallerie Maximilian von Weichs
  - Directly reporting:
    - 267th Infantry Division
    - 294th Infantry Division
  - IX Corps – General der Infanterie Hermann Geyer
    - 15th Infantry Division
    - 205th Infantry Division
  - XXVI Corps – General der Artillerie Albert Wodrig
    - 34th Infantry Division
    - 45th Infantry Division
    - 295th Infantry Division
  - VI Corps – General der Pioniere Otto-Wilhelm Förster
    - 5th Infantry Division
    - 293rd Infantry Division
- Ninth Army – Generaloberst Johannes Blaskowitz
  - Directly reporting:
    - 211th Infantry Division
  - XXXXII Corps – General der Pioniere Walter Kuntze
    - 50th Infantry Division
    - 291st Infantry Division
  - XXXXIII Corps – Generalleutnant Hermann Ritter von Speck, from 31 May Generalleutnant Franz Böhme
    - 88th Infantry Division
    - 96th Infantry Division
    - 292nd Infantry Division
  - XVIII Corps – General der Infanterie Eugen Beyer, from 5 June Generalleutnant Hermann Ritter von Speck
    - 25th Infantry Division
    - 81st Infantry Division
    - 290th Infantry Division

=== German Army Group A ===
Commanded by Generaloberst Gerd von Rundstedt (Chief of Staff: Generalleutnant Georg von Sodenstern)

- Fourth Army – Generaloberst Günther von Kluge (Chief of Staff: Generalmajor Kurt Brennecke)
  - II Corps – General der Infanterie Adolf Strauß -> 30.5.1940 General der Infanterie Carl-Heinrich von Stülpnagel
    - 12th Infantry Division – Generalmajor Walther von Seydlitz-Kurzbach
    - 32nd Infantry Division – Generalleutnant Franz Böhme
  - V Corps – General der Infanterie Richard Ruoff
    - 211th Infantry Division – Generalmajor Kurt Renner
    - 251st Infantry Division – Generalmajor Hans Kratzert
    - 263rd Infantry Division – Generalmajor Franz Karl
  - VIII Corps – General der Infanterie Walter Heitz
    - 8th Infantry Division – Generalmajor Rudolf Koch-Erpach
    - 28th Infantry Division – Generalleutnant Hans von Obstfelder -> 20.5.1940 Generalmajor Johann Sinnhuber
    - 87th Infantry Division – Generalmajor Bogislav von Studnitz
    - 267th Infantry Division – Generalmajor Ernst Fessmann
  - XV Corps – General der Infanterie Hermann Hoth (dispositions north to south: Yvoir-Houx-Dinant)
    - 5th Panzer Division – Generalleutnant Max von Hartlieb -> 22.5.1940 Generalleutnant Joachim Lemelsen -> 6.6.1940 Generalmajor Ludwig Cruwell
    - 7th Panzer Division – Generalmajor Erwin Rommel
    - 62nd Infantry Division – Generalmajor Walter Keiner
- Twelfth Army – Generaloberst Wilhelm List (Chief of Staff: Generalleutnant Eberhard von Mackensen)
  - III Corps – General der Artillerie Curt Haase
    - 3rd Infantry Division – Generalleutnant Walter Lichel
    - 23rd Infantry Division – Generalleutnant Walter von Brockdorff-Ahlefeldt
    - 52nd Infantry Division – Generalleutnant Hans-Jurgen von Arnim
  - VI Corps – General of Engineers Otto-Wilhelm Förster
    - 16th Infantry Division – Generalmajor Heinrich Krampf
    - 24th Infantry Division – Generalmajor Justin von Obernitz -> 1.6.1940 Generalmajor Hans-Valentin Hube
  - XVIII Corps – General der Infanterie Eugen Beyer -> 1.6. Generalleutnant Hermann Ritter von Speck
    - 5th Infantry Division – Generalleutnant Wilhelm Fahrmbacher
    - 21st Infantry Division – Generalmajor Otto Sponheimer
    - 25th Infantry Division – Generalleutnant Erich Clößner
    - 1st Mountain Division – Generalleutnant Ludwig Kübler
- Sixteenth Army – General der Infanterie Ernst Busch (Chief of Staff: Generalmajor Walter Model)
  - VII Corps – General der Infanterie Eugen von Schobert
    - 36th Infantry Division – Generalleutnant Georg Lindemann
    - 68th Infantry Division – Generalmajor Georg Braun
  - XIII Corps – Generalleutnant Heinrich von Vietinghoff
    - 15th Infantry Division – Generalmajor Friedrich-Wilhelm von Chappuis
    - 17th Infantry Division – Generalmajor Herbert Loch
    - 10th Infantry Division – Generalmajor Konrad von Cochenhausen
  - XXIII Corps – Generalleutnant Albrecht Schubert
    - 34th Infantry Division – Generalmajor Hans Behlendorff
    - 58th Infantry Division – Generalmajor Iwan Heunert
    - 76th Infantry Division – Generalmajor Maximilian de Angelis
    - 26th Infantry Division – Generalmajor Sigismund von Förster
- Panzer Group Kleist – General der Kavallerie Paul Ludwig Ewald von Kleist (Chief of Staff: Generalmajor Kurt Zeitzler)
  - XIV Corps – General der Infanterie Gustav Anton von Wietersheim
    - 2nd Infantry Division (mot.) – Generalleutnant Paul Bader
    - 13th Infantry Division (mot.) – Generalmajor Friedrich-Wilhelm von Rothkirch und Panthen
    - 29th Infantry Division (mot.) – Generalmajor Willibald Freiherr von Langermann und Erlencamp
  - XXXXI Corps – Generalleutnant Georg-Hans Reinhardt (disposition of Panzer Corps north to south, Montherme)
    - 6th Panzer Division – Generalmajor Werner Kempf
    - 8th Panzer Division – Oberst Erich Brandenberger
  - XIX Corps – General der Kavallerie Heinz Guderian (dispositions east to west: Donchery to Sedan)
    - 2nd Panzer Division – Generalleutnant Rudolf Veiel
    - 1st Panzer Division – Generalleutnant Friedrich Kirchner
    - 10th Panzer Division – Generalleutnant Ferdinand Schaal
    - Infantry Regiment Großdeutschland
- Reserves
  - XXXX Corps – Generalleutnant Georg Stumme
    - 6th Infantry Division – Generalleutnant Arnold Freiherr von Biegeleben
    - 9th Infantry Division – Generalleutnant Georg von Apell
    - 4th Infantry Division – Generalleutnant Erick-Oskar Hansen
    - 27th Infantry Division – Generalleutnant Friedrich Bergmann
    - 71st Infantry Division – Generalleutnant Karl Weisenberger
    - 73rd Infantry Division – Generalleutnant Bruno Bieler

=== German Army Group B ===
Commanded by Generaloberst Fedor von Bock (Chief of Staff: Generalleutnant Hans von Salmuth)

- Sixth Army – Generaloberst Walter von Reichenau (Chief of Staff: Generalmajor Friedrich Paulus)
  - XVI Corps – General der Kavallerie Erich Hoepner
    - 4th Infantry Division – Generalleutnant Erick-Oskar Hansen
    - 33rd Infantry Division – Generalmajor Rudolf Sintzenich
    - 3rd Panzer Division – Generalmajor Horst Stumpff
    - 4th Panzer Division – Generalmajor Ludwig Radlmeier -> 8.6.1940 Generalmajor Johann Joachim Stever
  - IV Corps – General der Infanterie Viktor von Schwedler
    - 15th Infantry Division – Generalmajor Ernst-Eberhard Hell
    - 205th Infantry Division – Generalleutnant Ernst Richter
  - XI Corps – Generalleutnant Joachim von Kortzfleisch
    - 7th Infantry Division – Generalmajor Eccard Freiherr von Gablenz
    - 211th Infantry Division – Generalmajor Kurt Renner
    - 31st Infantry Division – Generalleutnant Rudolf Kaempfe
  - IX Corps – General der Infanterie Hermann Geyer
  - XXVII Corps – General der Infanterie Alfred Wäger
    - 253th Infantry Division – Generalleutnant Fritz Kuhne
    - 269th Infantry Division – Generalmajor Ernst-Eberhard Hell
- Eighteenth Army – General der Artillerie Georg von Küchler
  - Reporting Directly
    - 1st Cavalry Division – Major General Kurt Feldt
  - X Corps – General Christian Hansen
    - SS "Adolf Hitler" Reinforced Regiment – Sepp Dietrich
    - 227th Infantry Division
    - 207th Infantry Division
    - SS "Der Fuhrer" Reinforced Regiment (Detached from SS "Verfugungstruppe" Division)
  - XXVI Corps - General Albert Wodrig
    - 256th Infantry Division
    - 254th Infantry Division
    - SS "Verfügungstruppe" Division (Less one Regiment "Der Fuhrer") – ss-Gruppenfuhrer Paul Hausser
    - 9th Panzer Division – Major General Alfred Ritter Von Hubicki
  - XXXIX Corps (Activated 13 May 1940) – Lieutenant General Rudolf Schmidt
  - Reserves
    - 208th Infantry Division
    - 225th Infantry Division
    - 526th Infantry Division
  - Air Landing Corps (Under Luftwaffe control)
    - 7th Air Division
    - 22nd Air Landing Infantry Division

=== German Army Group C ===
Commanded by Generaloberst Wilhelm Ritter von Leeb

- First Army – Generaloberst Erwin von Witzleben
  - Directly reporting:
    - 197th Infantry Division
  - Höh. Kom. z.b.V. XXXVII – Generalleutnant Alfred Böhm-Tettelbach
    - 246th Infantry Division
    - 215th Infantry Division
    - 262nd Infantry Division
    - 257th Infantry Division
  - XXIV Corps – General der Panzertruppe Leo Geyr von Schweppenburg
    - 60th Infantry Division
    - 252nd Infantry Division
    - 168th Infantry Division
  - XII Corps – General der Infanterie Gotthard Heinrici
    - 75th Infantry Division
    - 268th Infantry Division
    - 198th Infantry Division
  - XXX Corps – General der Artillerie Otto Hartmann
    - 258th Infantry Division
    - 93rd Infantry Division
    - 79th Infantry Division
  - Höh. Kom. z.b.V. XXXXV – General der Infanterie Kurt von Greiff
    - 95th Infantry Division
    - 167th Infantry Division
- Seventh Army – General der Artillerie Friedrich Dollmann
  - Höh. Kom. z.b.V. XXXIII – General der Kavallerie Georg Brandt
    - 213th Infantry Division
    - 554th Infantry Division
    - 556th Infantry Division
    - 239th Infantry Division
  - XXV Corps – General der Infanterie Karl Ritter von Prager
    - 557th Infantry Division
    - 555th Infantry Division
    - 6th Mountain Division
  - Directly reporting:
    - 218th Infantry Division
    - 221st Infantry Division

=== Italian Army Group "West" ===
Commanded by Prince General Umberto di Savoia

- 1st Army – General Pietro Pintor
  - II Army Corps – General Francesco Bertini
  - III Army Corps – General Mario Arisio
  - XV Army Corps – General Gastone Gambara
- 4th Army – General Alfredo Guzzoni
  - I Army Corps – General Carlo Vecchiarelli
  - IV Army Corps – General Camillo Mercalli
  - Alpine Army Corps – General Luigi Negri Cesi

Overall, the Italian forces numbered about 312,000 troops. However they had inadequate artillery and transport and most were not equipped for the cold Alpine environment.
