= German order of battle in the Balkans campaign (1941) =

During World War II, the Axis invasions of Greece (Operation Marita) and Yugoslavia both commenced on 6 April 1941 and ended 30 April 1941.

== Oberkommando des Heeres reserves ==
Reserves directly commanded by the Oberkommando des Heeres:

4th Panzer Division (Generalmajor Willibald Freiherr von Langermann und Erlencamp)
12th Panzer Division (Generalmajor Josef Harpe)
19th Panzer Division (Generalmajor Otto von Knobelsdorff)
100th Light Division (Generalleutnant Werner Sanne)
101st Light Division (Generalleutnant Erich Marcks)

== Second Army ==
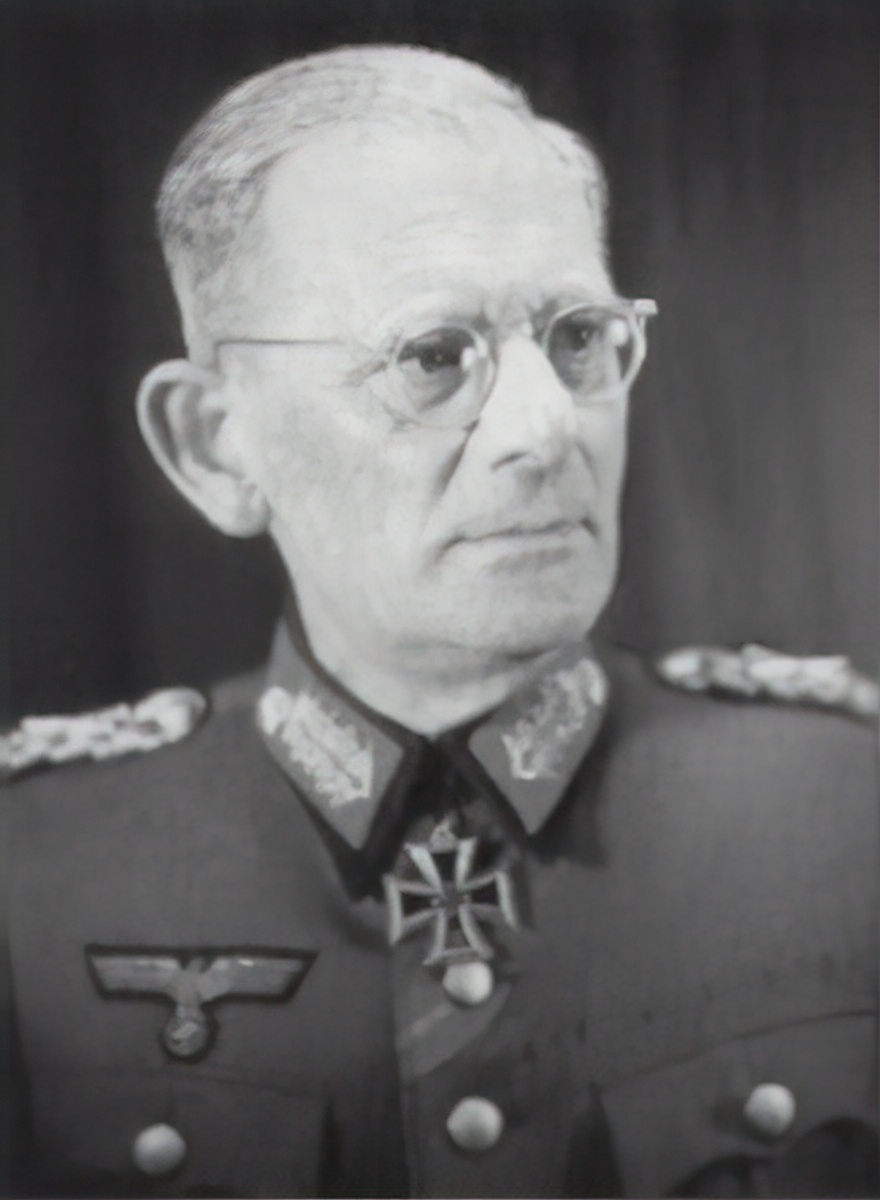
Maximilian von Weichs

Generaloberst Maximilian Reichsfreiherr Von Weichs zu Glon

XXXXIX Mountain Corps
General der Gebirgstruppen Ludwig Kübler

1st Mountain Division (Generalmajor Hubert Lanz)

LI Army Corps
General der Infanterie Hans-Wolfgang Reinhard

132nd Infantry Division (Generalleutnant Rudolf Sintzenich)
183rd Infantry Division (Generalleutnant Benignus Dippold)

XXXXVI Army Corps (motorized)
General der Panzertruppen Heinrich von Vietinghoff gennant Scheel

8th Panzer Division (Generalmajor Erich Brandenberger)
14th Panzer Division, (Generalmajor Friedrich Kuhn)
16th Infantry Division (motorized), (Generalmajor Sigfrid Henrici)

Second Army Reserve

LII Army Corps
General der Infanterie Kurt von Briesen

169th Infantry Division (Generalmajor Kurt Dittmar)
197th Infantry Division (Generalleutnant Hermann Meyer-Rabingen)
125th Infantry Division (Generalleutnant Wilhelm Schneckenburger)

== Twelfth Army ==
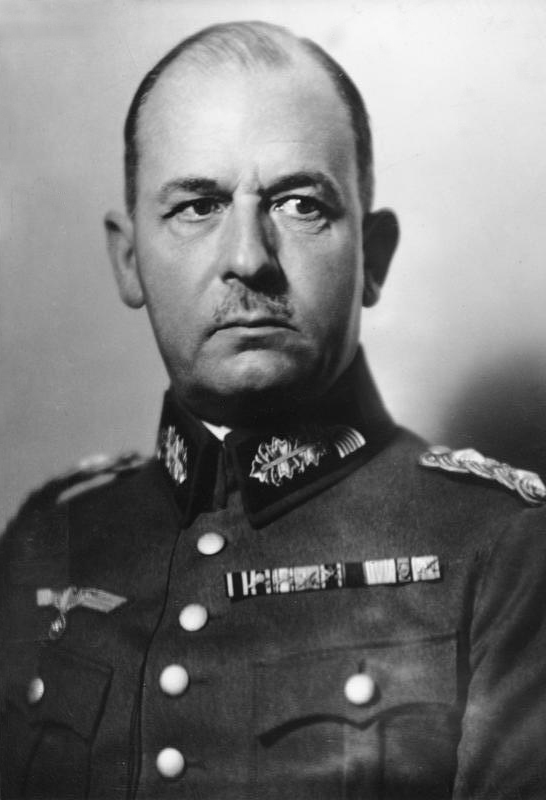
Wilhelm List

Generalfeldmarschall Wilhelm List

XXXX Army Corps (motorized)
Generalleutnant Georg Stumme

9th Panzer Division (Generalmajor Alfred Ritter von Hubicki)
1st SS Brigade (motorized) Leibstandarte Adolf Hitler (SS-Obergruppenführer Josef Dietrich)
73rd Infantry Division (Generalmajor Bruno Bieler)

XXXVIII Mountain Corps
General der Infanterie Franz Böhme

2nd Panzer Division (Generalleutnant Rudolf Veiel)
5th Mountain Division (Generalleutnant Julius Ringel)
6th Mountain Division (Generalleutnant Ferdinand Schörner)
72nd Infantry Division (Generalleutnant Franz Mattenklott)
125th Infantry Regiment

XXX Army Corps
General der Artillerie Otto Hartmann

50th Infantry Division (Generalleutnant Karl-Adolf Hollidt)
164th Infantry Division (Generalmajor Josef Folttmann)

Twelfth Army reserve

L Army Corps
General der Kavallerie Georg Lindemann

46th Infantry Division (Generalmajor Karl Kriebel)
16th Panzer Division (Generalmajor Hans-Valentin Hube)

Panzer Group 1
Generaloberst Paul Ludwig Ewald von Kleist

XIV Army Corps (motorized)
General der Infanterie Gustav Anton von Wietersheim

5th Panzer Division (Generalleutnant Gustav Fehn)
11th Panzer Division (Generalleutnant Ludwig Crüwell)
4th Mountain Division (Generalleutnant Karl Eglseer)
294th Infantry Division (Generalleutnant Otto Gabke)

XXXXI Army Corps (motorized)
Generalleutnant Georg-Hans Reinhardt

2nd SS Division Das Reich (SS-Gruppenführer Paul Hausser)
Infantry Regiment (motorized) Großdeutschland (Oberst Wilhelm-Hunold von Stockhausen)

XI Army Corps
General der Infanterie Joachim von Kortzfleisch

60th Infantry Division (motorized) (Generalmajor Friedrich-Georg Eberhardt)
76th Infantry Division (Generalleutnant Maximilian de Angelis)
198th Infantry Division (Generalmajor Otto Röttig)

== See also ==
- Operation Castigo
- Operation Demon
