= Hermann Ritter von Speck =

German General and Knight's Cross recipient (1888–1940)

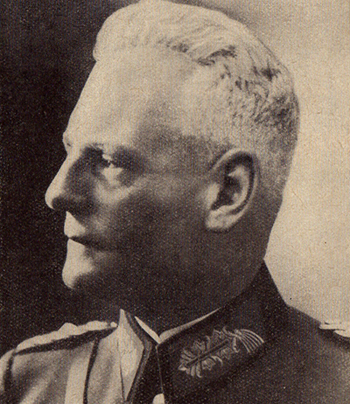
- Born: 8 August 1888; Munich
- Died: 15 June 1940 (aged 51); Pont-sur-Yonne, France
- Military career
- Allegiance: German Empire (to 1918); Weimar Republic (to 1933); Nazi Germany
- Branch: Royal Bavarian Army; Reichswehr; Army (Wehrmacht)
- Service years: 1907–1940
- Rank: General of the Artillery
- Commands: 33. Infanterie-Division; XXXXIII. Armeekorps; XVIII. Armeekorps
- Conflicts: World War I World War II Battle of France
- Awards: Knight's Cross of the Iron Cross

Hermann Ritter von Speck (8 August 1888 – 15 June 1940) was a German general during World War II. He was a recipient of the Knight's Cross of the Iron Cross of Nazi Germany. Speck was killed by French machine gun fire on 15 June 1940 in Pont-sur-Yonne, France.

Speck was born in Munich in 1888 and entered the Royal Bavarian Army in 1907. He fought in World War I and, at the end of the war, he was a highly decorated Hauptmann and the deputy adjutant in the 6th Field Artillery Brigade. After World War I, Speck joined the Freikorps and participated in the suppression of the German Revolution of 1918–1919 in southern Bavaria, Landshut, Augsburg, and Munich. He later became an Oberst in the Reichswehr. Speck was promoted to Generalmajor on 1 August 1937 and to Generalleutnant on 1 June 1939. He was posthumously awarded the Knight's Cross of the Iron Cross on 17 October 1940, and posthumously promoted to General der Artillerie on 15 December 1944.

In 2010, Jay Nordlinger spoke with von Speck's daughter, who claimed that the general deliberately sought death in battle: "According to his daughter, he wanted to die, and arranged to die. He felt he could not break his oath to the army — he could not desert. And his Catholic faith prevented him from committing suicide — suicide straight out, you might say. So, he put himself in the line of fire. In his dying words, he did not say, 'Give my love to my family', or anything like that. He said, 'It had to be this way'.”

== Awards and decorations ==
- Iron Cross (1914), 2nd class and 1st class
- Knight's Cross of the Military Order of Max Joseph (which carried admission to the nobility)
- Military Merit Order of Bavaria, 4th class with swords and crown
- Hanseatic Cross of Hamburg
- Wound Badge (1918) in black
- Honour Cross of the World War 1914/1918
- Clasp to the Iron Cross, 2nd class and 1st class
- Knight's Cross of the Iron Cross on 17 October 1940 as Generalleutnant and commander of XVIII. Armeekorps
- Wound Badge (1939) in gold

Military offices
Preceded by General der Infanterie Eugen Ritter von Schobert	Commander of 33. Infantry-Division; 1 March 1938 - 29 April 1940	Succeeded by Generalleutnant Rudolf Sintzenich
Preceded by None	Commander of XXXXIII. Armeekorps; 29 April 1940 - 31 May 1940	Succeeded by Generalleutnant Franz Böhme
Preceded by General der Infanterie Eugen Beyer	Commander of XVIII. Armeekorps; 5 June 1940 - 15 June 1940	Succeeded by General der Gebirgstruppe Franz Böhme
