= André-Gaston Prételat =

General in the French Army

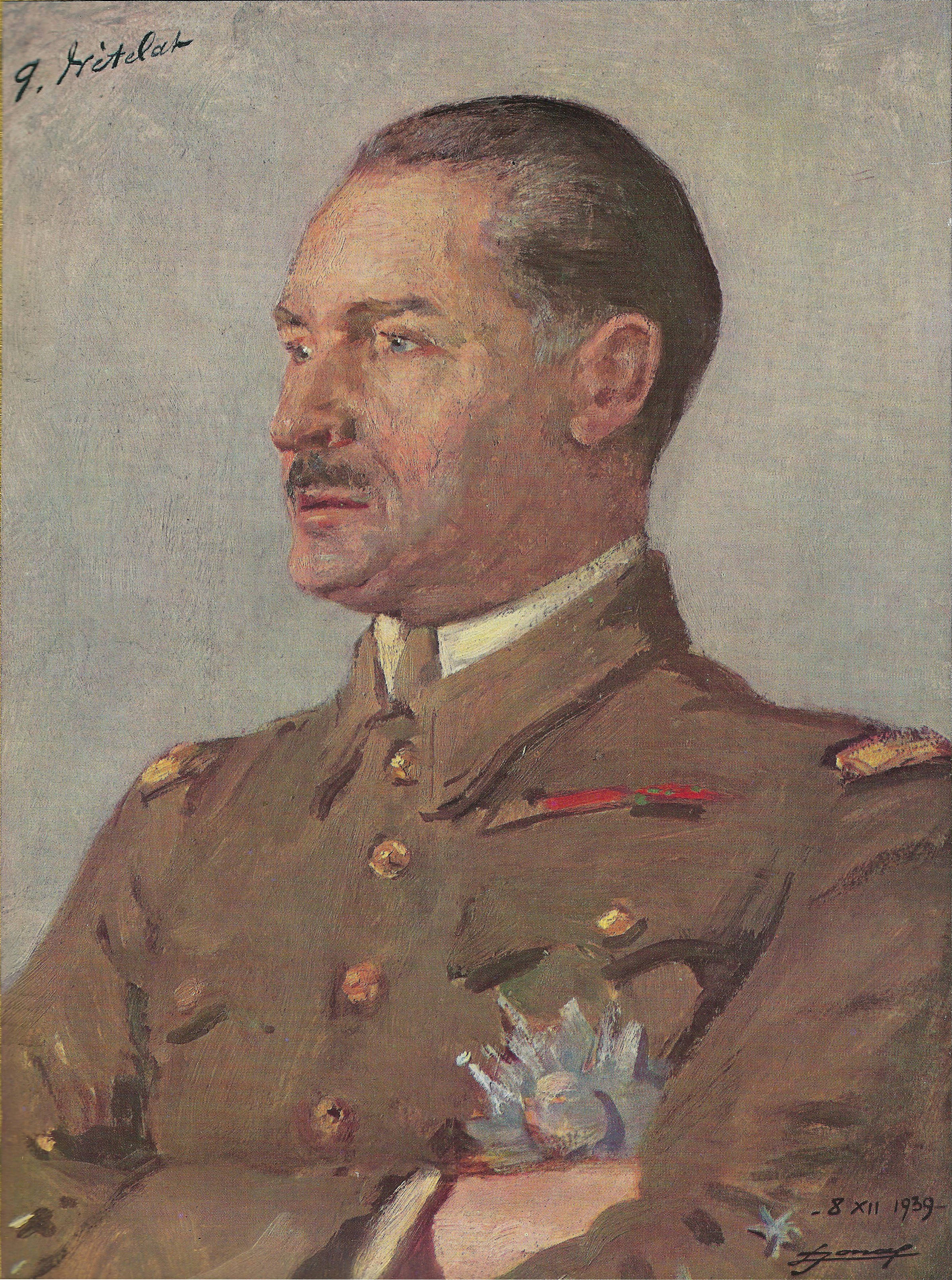
A 1939 portrait of Prételat.

André-Gaston Prételat (14 November 1874, Wassy, Champagne, France – 6 December 1969, Paris, France) was a general in the French Army.

== Military career ==
=== 1910–1918 ===
His first post, from 1910 to 1912, was as military attaché to Tangier. During the First World War he was the chief of staff of 70th Division (1915) and then of XXXIII Corps (1916), before becoming the commanding officer of the 159th Regiment and Deputy Chief of Staff to Henri Gouraud's French Fourth Army (1917), and finally Chief of Staff of the Fourth Army. After the Armistice, he became chief of staff of the Army of Alsace (1918), the troops occupying Alsace-Lorraine (annexed by France from Germany).

=== Interwar period: 1918–1939 ===
During the inter-war years he returned to the French colonies, acting as chief of staff in the Levant from 1919 to 1923, then as chief of staff to General Gouraud for four years from 1923. He next held three posts as general officer commanding, first of First Division (1927 to 1930), then of the Eleventh Military Region (1930), and finally of the Paris Military Region (a.k.a. the Second Military Region, from 1930 to 1934). From 1934 to the outbreak of the Second World War he was Member Supreme of the 19-strong war council.

In 1938 he was commander-designate of the French Second Army, and in that role he held exercises that year which revealed that the Ardennes were impossible to defend; although his prediction as to the time it would take Germany to breach defenses was off by only three hours of the time it actually took in May 1940, he was accused of pessimism. He pointed out security weaknesses in the defensive fortifications of the north-east border of France in December 1938 and attempted to address these with improvements he planned in April 1939 but efforts had scarcely been undertaken when the war began in September 1939.

=== World War II: 1939–1940 ===
Prételat openly opposed entering the war with Germany along with one other member of the War Council, but nevertheless did send the French Second Army Group on what he feared would be an underpowered offensive against the German Siegfried Line in the Saar on 8 September. The offensive was halted only four days after it had begun on order of French chief of staff Maurice Gamelin, and Prételat withdrew the Second Army Group to behind the Maginot Line, in the north-eastern sector of the French northern front, to where they would remain until the outbreak of the Battle of France on 10 May 1940.

At first, Prételat withheld his troops, which were inadequate in number to the task at hand, but by the second week Prételat had reinforced units directly facing the German offensive in the northwest with 20 of his 30 divisions. On 26 May, in fear that German forces would overwhelm exhausted groups to his west, Prételat sought and was refused permission to retreat. His troops remained in place until collapse was imminent, when, on 12 June, they were ordered to withdraw. They were shortly surrounded by German troops in spite of their resistance, continuing their efforts for a short time even after the French surrender of 22 June 1940.

It was Prételat's last engagement in the war.

== Sources ==
- Generals.dk
- History and the Headlines
