= 2nd Division (Netherlands) =

- 2e Divisie
- Active: Mobilized: April 1940 – Disbanded: May 1940
- Disbanded: May 1940
- Country: Netherlands
- Branch: Royal Netherlands Army (Koninklijke Landmacht)
- Type: Infantry Division
- Role: Defence of the Grebbe Line (*Grebbelinie*)
- Size: Division
- Part of: Part of the II Army Corps
- Engagements: World War II: Battle of the Netherlands (1940); Battle of the Grebbeberg (Hauptverteidigungsabschnitt)

Commanders
- Commander (1940): Major General J. van der Waals

As a pivotal infantry formation of the II Army Corps, the 2nd Division (Dutch: 2e Divisie) of the Royal Netherlands Army was mobilized in April 1940. The division held a critical position along the center of the formidable Grebbe Line defense. During the initial days of the Battle of the Netherlands, the 2nd Division endured some of the campaign's heaviest fighting as German forces attempted to force a decisive breakthrough.

The division bore the brunt of the German attack on the Grebbe Line, particularly during the intense fighting at the Grebbeberg.

== Organisation (May 10, 1940) ==
The division was commanded by Major General J. van der Waals.

The structure of the 2nd Division on the eve of the German invasion was as follows:

=== Subordinate Regiments ===
- 5th Infantry Regiment (5e Regiment Infanterie)
- 7th Infantry Regiment (7e Regiment Infanterie)
- 10th Infantry Regiment (10e Regiment Infanterie)

=== Divisional Troops ===
- 3rd Regiment Artillery (3e Regiment Artillerie)
- 2nd Anti-Tank Company (2e Compagnie Pantserafweergeschut)
- 2nd Signals Company (2e Compagnie Verbindingstroepen)
- 2nd Engineer Company (2e Genie Compagnie)
- Detached Units:
  - III Battalion, 10th Infantry Regiment – Attached to 19e Regiment Infanterie.
  - III Battalion, 4th Infantry Regiment – Attached from 4th Division.

== Commanders ==
- Major General J. van der Waals
