= 33rd Infantry Division (Wehrmacht) =

German Army infantry division active in World War II

- The division's emblem
- Active: 1 April 1936 – 11 November 1940
- Country: Nazi Germany
- Branch: Army
- Type: Infantry
- Size: Division
- Garrison/HQ: Darmstadt

The 33rd Infantry Division (German: 33. Infanterie-Division) was a German Army infantry division active in World War II. It served in the battle of France and subsequently was converted into the 15th Panzer Division.

== History ==
The 33rd Infantry Division was formed in 1936, as part of the Wehrmacht's expansion to 36 divisions. It was mobilized in 1939, but remained on the defensive in the west and did not take part in the invasion of Poland.

In May 1940 the division was attached to Panzer Group Kleist, and followed in reserve behind the advance into the Low Countries, through Luxembourg and Bastogne. Marching into France, it reached the battle front near St Quentin, and took up defensive positions along the Somme at Peronne It built a bridgehead across the river, which was used by the armored divisions of XVI motorised Army Corps in the relaunch of the German offensive on 6 June 1940. Attacking alongside the panzers the division broke through the Weygand line, and advanced to the south.

When the XVI Panzer Corps was withdrawn on 8 June for reassignment, the 33rd Infantry Division took over the 3rd Panzer Division sector, and continued the advance towards Paris. The division then accelerated its pace, crossing first the Marne, followed by the Seine and the Loire, finally reaching the Cher at Montrichard

Following the French surrender, it spent two months with the occupation forces until it was returned to Germany and in November 1940 was dissolved. The bulk of the division was reorganized as the 15th Panzer Division by incorporating the 8th Panzer Regiment from the 10th Panzer Division. Its surplus 110th Infantry Regiment went to the 112th Infantry Division and its horse drawn elements were incorporated into the newly forming 129th Infantry Division.

== Commanders ==
- General der Infanterie Eugen Ritter von Schobert (1 April 1936 – 4 February 1938)
- Generalleutnant Hermann Ritter von Speck (1 March 1938 – 29 April 1940)
- Generalleutnant Rudolf Sintzenich (29 April 1940 – 5 October 1940)
- Generalmajor Friedrich Kühn (5 October 1940 – 11 November 1940)
