= 556th Infantry Division =

- German: 556. Infanterie-Division
- Active: 11 February 1940 – 13 August 1940
- Country: Nazi Germany
- Branch: Heer (Wehrmacht)
- Type: Infantry
- Size: Division
- Engagements: Phony War

Commanders
- Commander: Kurt von Berg

The 556th Infantry Division (German: 556. Infanterie-Division) was an infantry division of the Heer, the ground forces of Nazi Germany's Wehrmacht. It was active for several months in the year 1940.

== History ==
The 556th Infantry Division was formed in Posen (West Prussia) as a garrison for the Upper Rhine area in Wehrkreis XII (roughly equivalent to the modern-day Saarland and Rhineland-Palatinate) on the Franco-German border.

Its staff was assembled from the former Division Command z.b.V. 426 at Nakel. It contained three infantry regiments: Infantry Regiment 628 was formed in Wehrkreis XVII using personnel from several Landesschützen Regiments, Infantry Regiment 629 in Wehrkreis XXI from Machine Gun Regiment 138, and Infantry Regiment 630 from various Landesschützen and infantry units in Ulm and Rinteln across Wehrkreis IX and Wehrkreis XI, drawing personnel from parts of the 214th Infantry Division and 216th Infantry Division, among others. The infantry regiments contained three battalions each. Additionally, the division contained Artillery Regiment 556, which consisted of three artillery detachments (I./, II./, and III./ (from military districts XI, X and XII, respectively)), Observation Detachment 556 (from military district XX), and the supporting Division Units 556 (without Panzerjäger, reconnaissance and pioneer units). The division's personnel was mainly drawn from older conscripts that had been called up in September 1939, and the division's commander throughout its existence was Kurt von Berg.

The 556th Division was assigned to frontier protection duty on the Franco-German border under supervision of Higher Command XXXIII of 7th Army in May and June 1940, along with the similar 554th Infantry Division. On the Franco-German border, it guarded the Westwall fortifications (Allied parlance: "Siegfried Line").

It protected the German rear during the rapid advances by Wehrmacht troops during the Battle of France. The division was rendered superfluous by the German victory in the west, and the directive for the division's dissolution was issued on 26 July 1940. The division was officially dissolved on 13 August 1940 (through remnants remained until 1 October), and several of the infantry battalions (II./628, III./628, II./629, III./629, I./640, III./640) were reorganized into independent home guard battalions (German: Heimat-Wach-Bataillone), which were redesignated into the Landesschützen Battalions 784 through 789.
