= 554th Infantry Division =

German World War II military unit

- 554. Infanterie-Division
- Active: 15 February 1940 – 13 August 1940
- Country: Nazi Germany
- Branch: Heer (Wehrmacht)
- Type: Infantry
- Size: Division
- Engagements: Phony War

Commanders
- Commander: Anton von Hirschberg

The 554th Infantry Division (German: 554. Infanterie-Division) was an infantry division of the Heer, the ground forces of Nazi Germany's Wehrmacht. It was active for several months in the year 1940.

== History ==
The 554th Infantry Division was formed on 15 February 1940 in Wehrkreis V for service for the Upper Rhine sector on the Franco-German border, where it served as a positional division on defensive duty on the Westwall (Allied parlance: "Siegfried Line"). The division's commander throughout its entire duration of service was Anton von Hirschberg.

Initially, the division's staff was drawn from Division Command z.b.V. 441 and contained three infantry regiments (621, 622, 623) as well as an Artillery Regiment, an Observation Detachment and a Division Units contingent (each numbered 554). Infantry Regiment 621 was formed in Wehrkreis XXI using personnel from Infantry Regiment 532 of 246th Division as well as Machine Gun Regiment 148 (at Glogau), Infantry Regiment 622 was formed in Wehrkreis VIII using personnel from Infantry Regiment 423 of 212th Division as well as Landesschützen Regiment 2./IX (at Frankfurt/Main), and Infantry Regiment 623 was formed in the Prague area using personnel from Infantry Regiment 380 of 215th Division.

The division was deployed in May and June 1940 as part of Higher Command XXXIII under 7th Army of Army Group C on the German border with France, along with the similar 556th Infantry Division. Its front sector remained quiet even during much of the Battle of France.

Following the German victory in the Battle of France (Armistice of 22 June 1940), the divisions on the Westwall became superfluous. The 554th Infantry Division was dissolved on 13 August 1940 in Donaueschingen, the battalions I./621, II./621, III./621, I./622, II./622, II./623 and III./623 were repurposed as autonomous home guard battalions and sent to Wehrkreis VII, where they became the Landesschützen Battalions 439 through 445 on 1 January 1941.
