= Gabriel Bougrain =

French military personnel

General Gabriel Bougrain
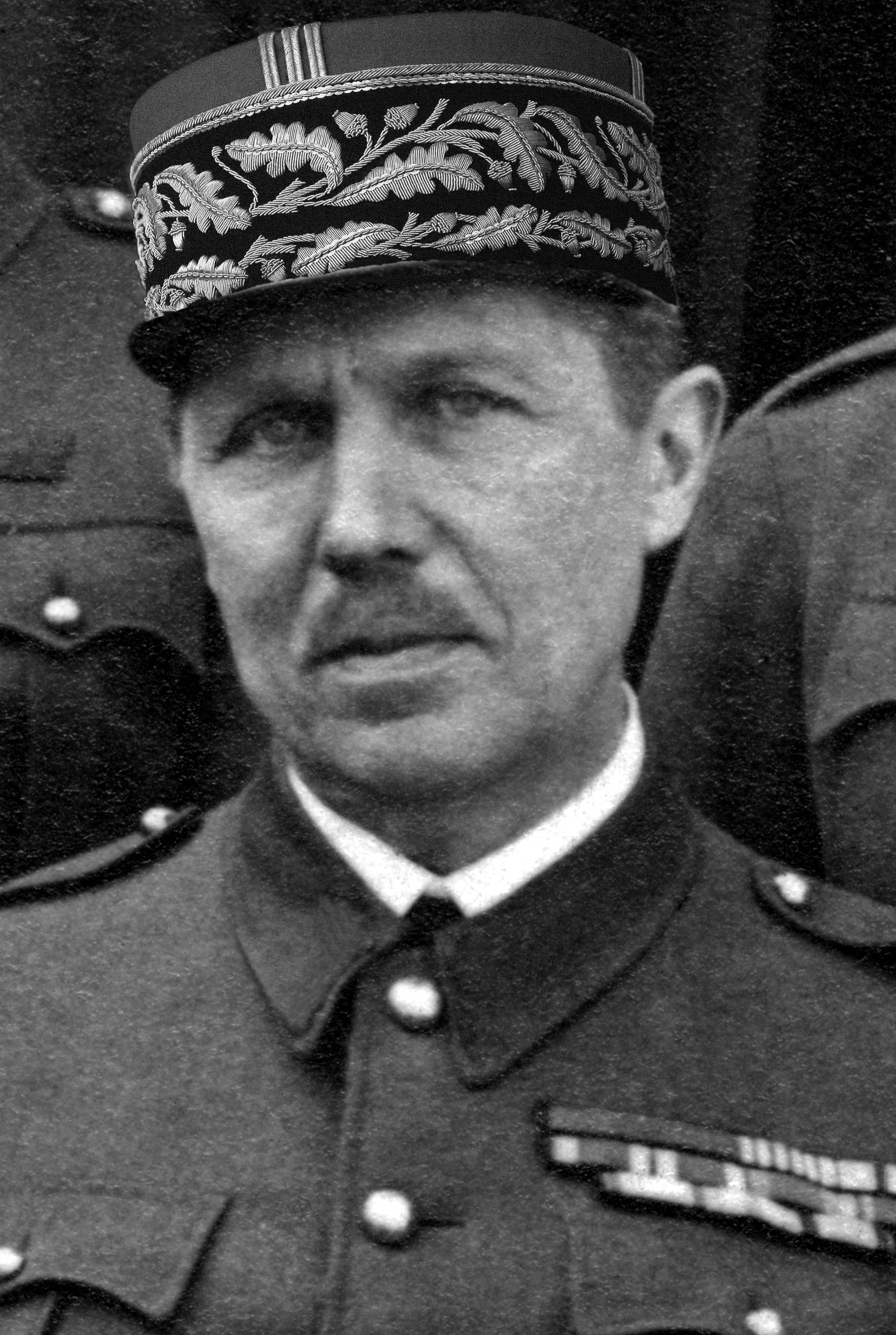

Personal details
- Born: 9 April 1882 Saint-Germain-en-Laye (France)
- Died: 31 May 1966 (aged 84) Laval (France)
- Awards: commander of the Legion of Honour Croix de guerre 1914-1918 Croix de guerre 1939-1945

Military service
- Allegiance: French Third Republic
- Rank: Division general
- Commands: 4th Tunisian Spahi Regiment; 2nd Light Mechanized Division
- Battles/wars: World War I World War II

Gabriel, Marie, Joseph Bougrain (Laval, April 9, 1882 ; Saint-Germain-en-Laye, May 30, 1966) was a general of the French Army who commanded the 2nd Light Mechanized Division during World War II. He is buried in the cemetery of Sainte-Marie-de-Ré.

== Origins ==
Gabriel Bougrain was born in Laval in 1882 to a family of bankers, only a few years after the defeat of Sedan and the fall of the Second Empire. He was the son of Auguste Bougrain, owner of the Bougrain bank in Laval, and Marguerite Lelièvre. His grandfather Augustin, a yarn merchant for several generations, bore the surname Bougrain-Dubourg, which originated from the Bougrain, master du Bourg in Vaucé, where Michel Bougrain, son of the royal notary of Couesmes, had settled in the middle of the 18th century. As the yarn industry in Mayenne was in sharp decline, Father Bougrain-Dubourg, chaplain of Sainte-Anne Hospital Center and the Salpêtrière, encouraged his brother Augustin to direct his sons to the banking trades. Auguste Bougrain's son chose another path, the career of arms.

== Early career ==
He entered Saint Cyr in 1903 - promotion of La Tour d'Auvergne- and left for the cavalry. After his time at the Saumur Cavalry School of Application, he served in the 5th Dragoons Regiment, and then in the Chasseurs d’Afrique. At the end of the course of instruction, he was appointed sub-squire of the Cadre Noir. In 1909 he married Yvonne O'Mahony, daughter of Count O'Mahony and Marthe d'Amphernet of Pontbellanger. The O'Mahony are descended from an illustrious Irish family who came to serve the King of France. Barthelemy, Count O'Mahony, Lieutenant-General of the King's Armies, Grand Cross of the Order of St. Louis, commanded the Berwick Regiment in 1788.

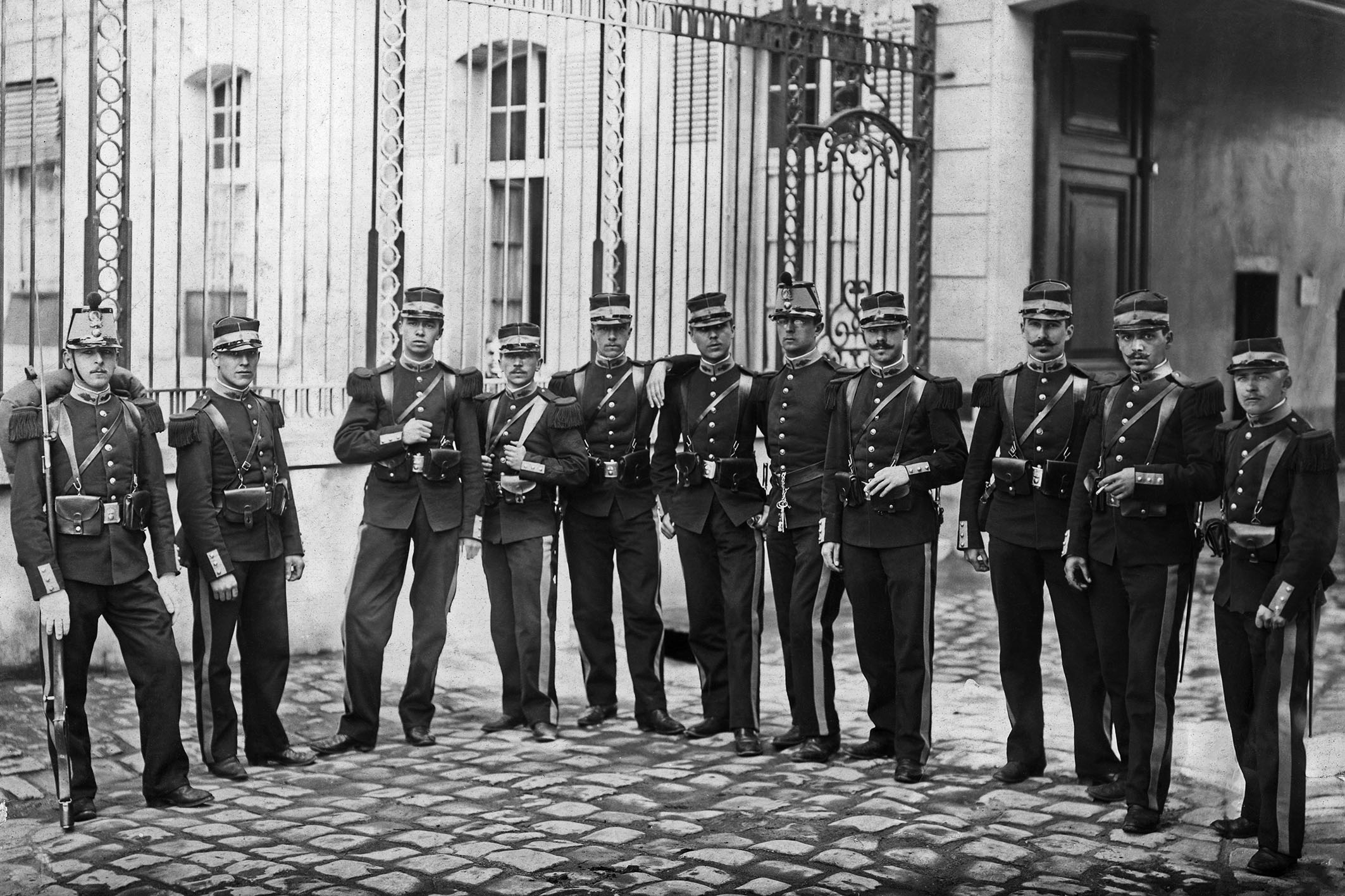
Officers Students of the promotion La Tour d'Auvergne (1903) in front of the gates of Saint-Cyr.

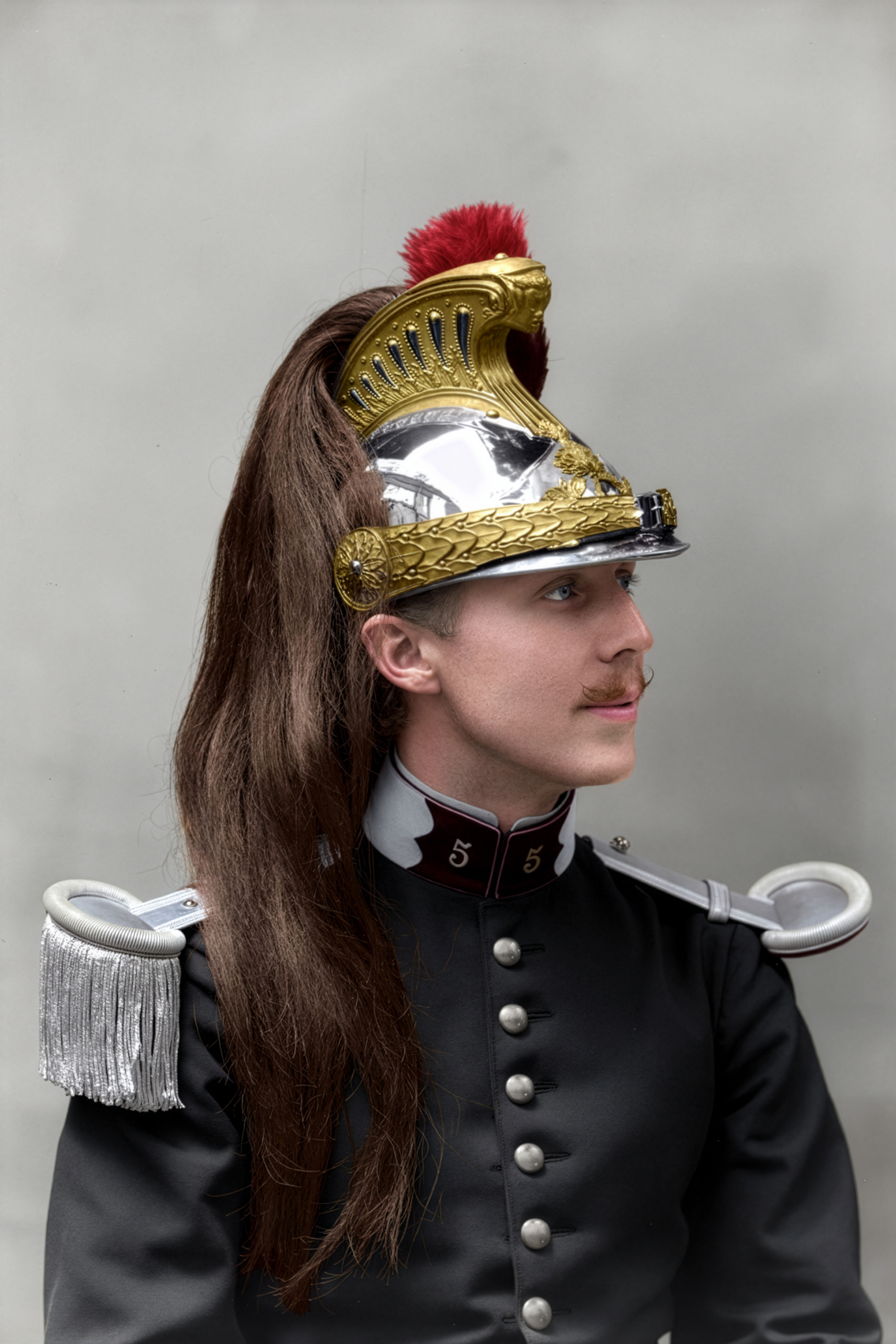
When he left Saint-Cyr, Gabriel Bougrain was a second lieutenant in the 5th Rgt de Dragoons. 1905

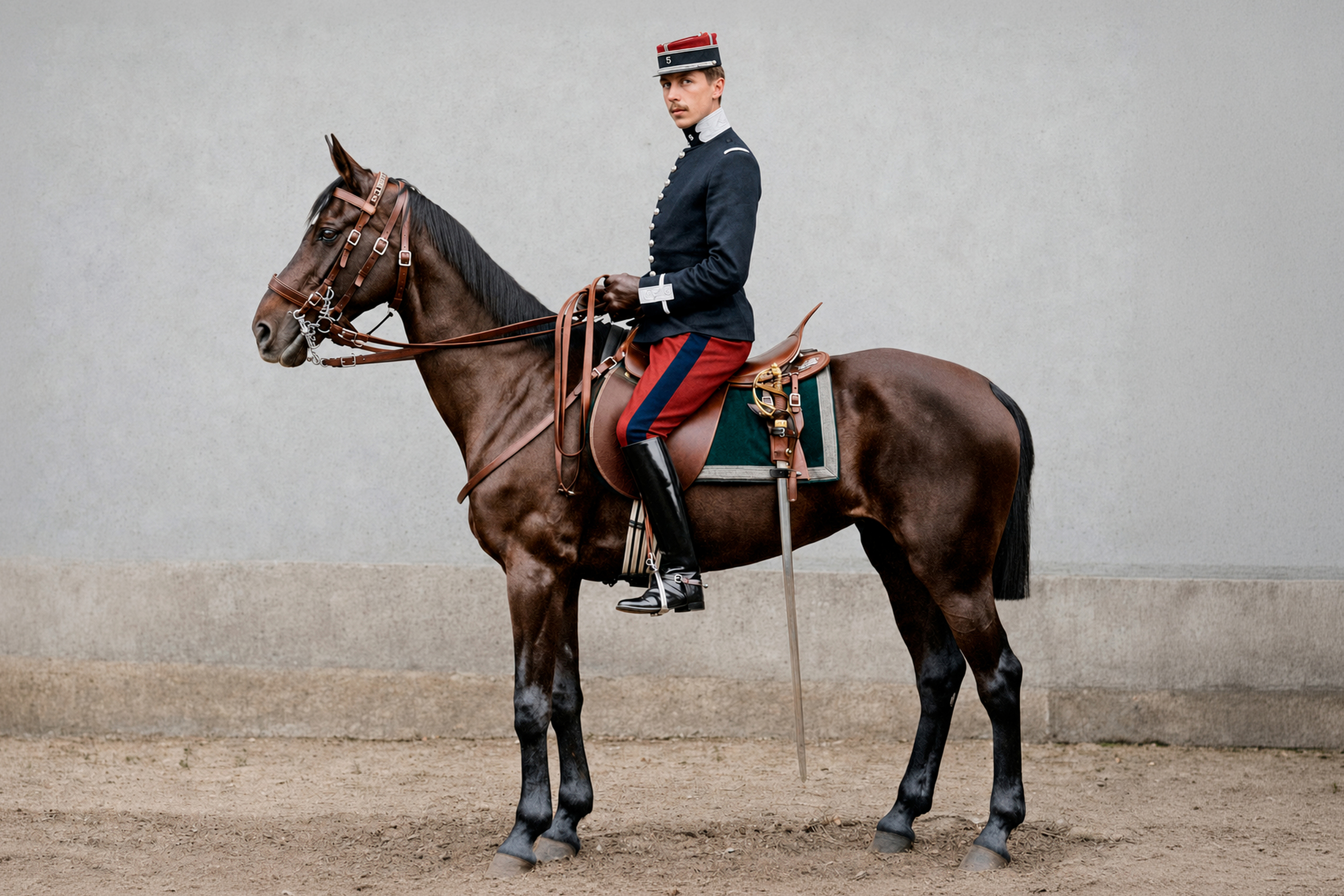
Second Lieutenant Bougrain graduated first from the Saumur Cavalry Application School (1905-1906)

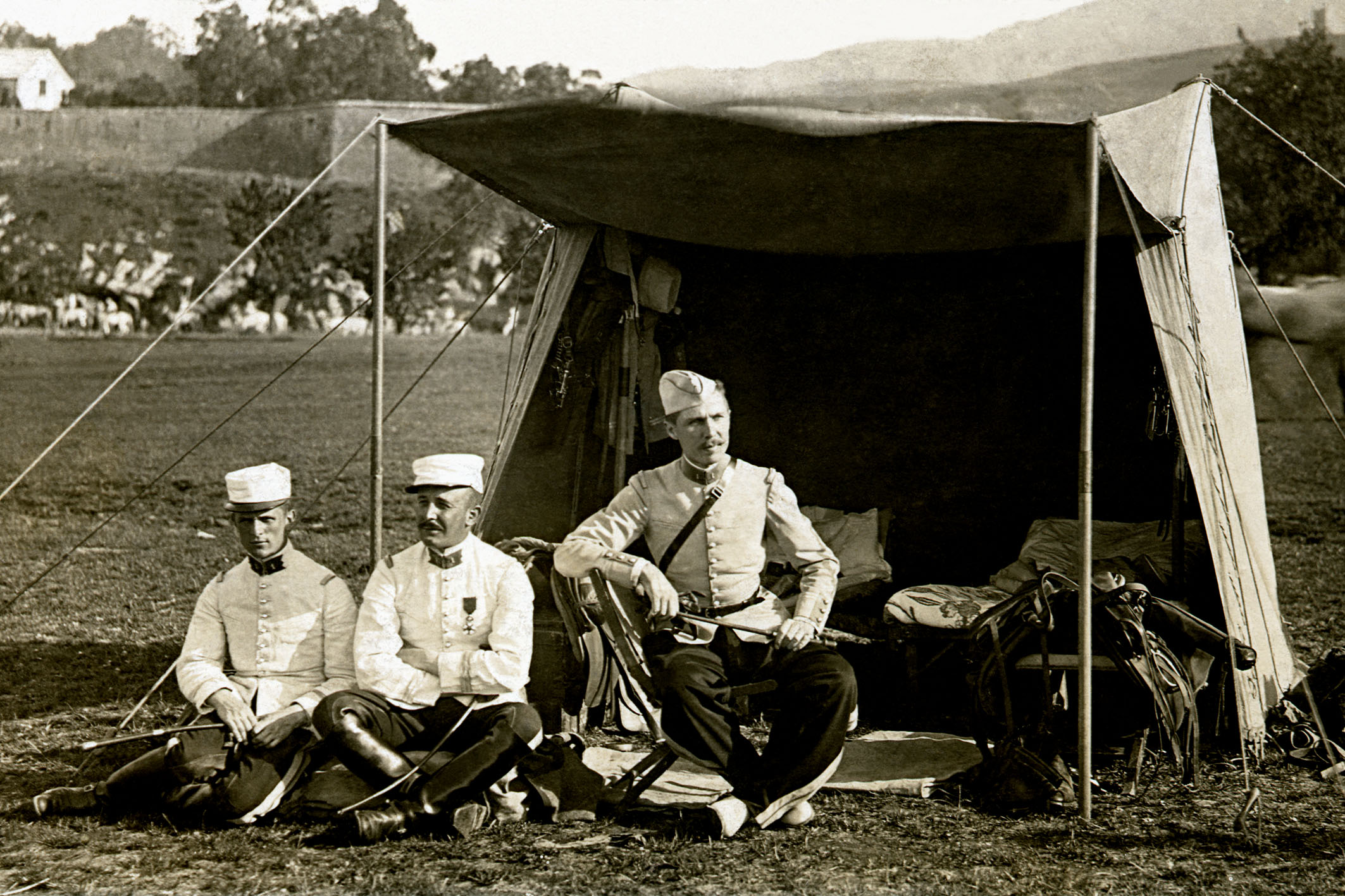
Camp of the 1st Chasseurs d'Afrique Regt. Aumale (Algeria), June 1909.

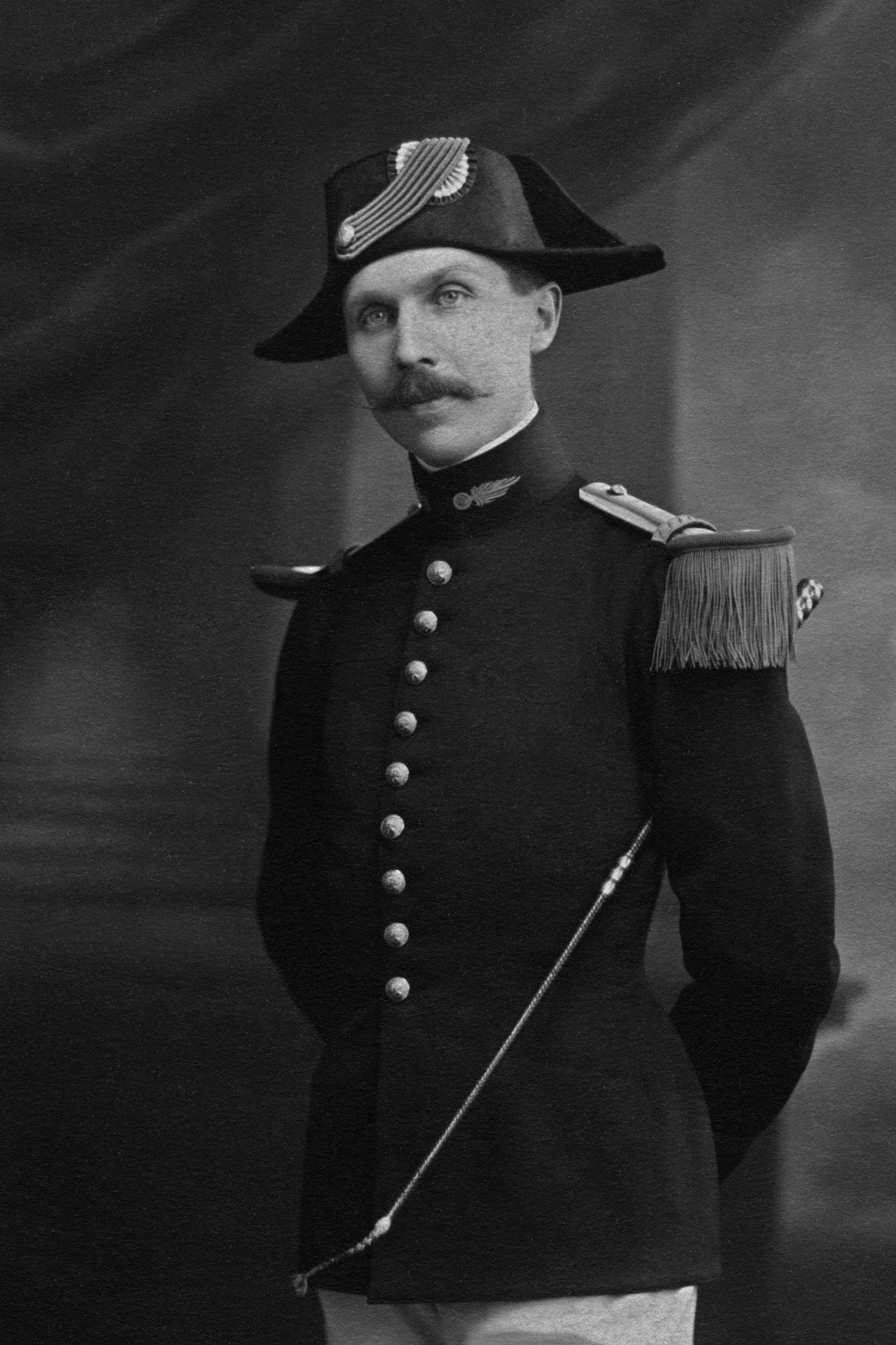
Lieutenant Bougrain in the Cadre Noir uniform (1914).

== World War I ==
From the declaration of World War I, he was a reconnaissance officer in the divisional squadron of the 60th Infantry Division. He served at the headquarter of the same division. This period on the war front earned him three citations:

- September 5, 1914, Lieutenant Bougrain, 24th Dragoon Regiment cited
Reconnaissance officer with rare fearlessness, always willing to get involved. Foch. Croix de guerre with palm.

- November 24, 1915, Captain Bougrain, Gabriel
Officer of unwavering dedication and renowned bravery, has shown during reconnaissance missions that he has performed the most brilliant qualities of intelligence, spirit and fearlessness. Cited to the order of the Army on September 5, 1914. Joffre. Knight of the Legion of honour, Croix de guerre with palm.

- July 23, 1916, Captain Bougrain, Gabriel
Elite officer. During the fighting in Verdun, from 1 to 12 July 1916, demonstrated the most absolute dedication and reported the most accurate information following reconnaissance carried out on the war front. Patey. Croix de Guerre with silver star.

At the end of 1916, he volunteered for the Army of the Orient, arrived in Salonika on 14 December and was successively under the command of General Sarrail, then General Guillaumat and finally General Franchet d'Espèrey. He was first appointed to organize and then lead the Hortackoy training instructions center, learning to fly at the Verria Mikros base (Macedonia) with Captain Victor Denain, head of the French Army's aeronautical service on the Eastern Front. He was appointed to head the 3rd Office headquarter of the Allied Armed Forces of the Orient, with a recommendation from General Franchet d'Espèrey. After the armistice, the Commander-in Chief charged him with accompanying the Ottoman delegation to the Peace Congress in Paris.

On September 15, 1918, he was cited to the order of the Army: Captain Bougrain, Gabriel

-“A first-rate officer whose brilliant military qualities continued to assert themselves during the war. Especially during his time in the Orient, has always been for the command a valuable auxiliary officer, executing with as much intelligence as calm bravery many reconnaissances as an Officer on the war front, either on land or in plane, and leading with as much skill as self-sacrifice the training centers of the Allied Armies where he has achieved quite remarkable results both in the French Army and in the Allied Armies.” Franchet d'Espèrey. Croix de Guerre with palm.

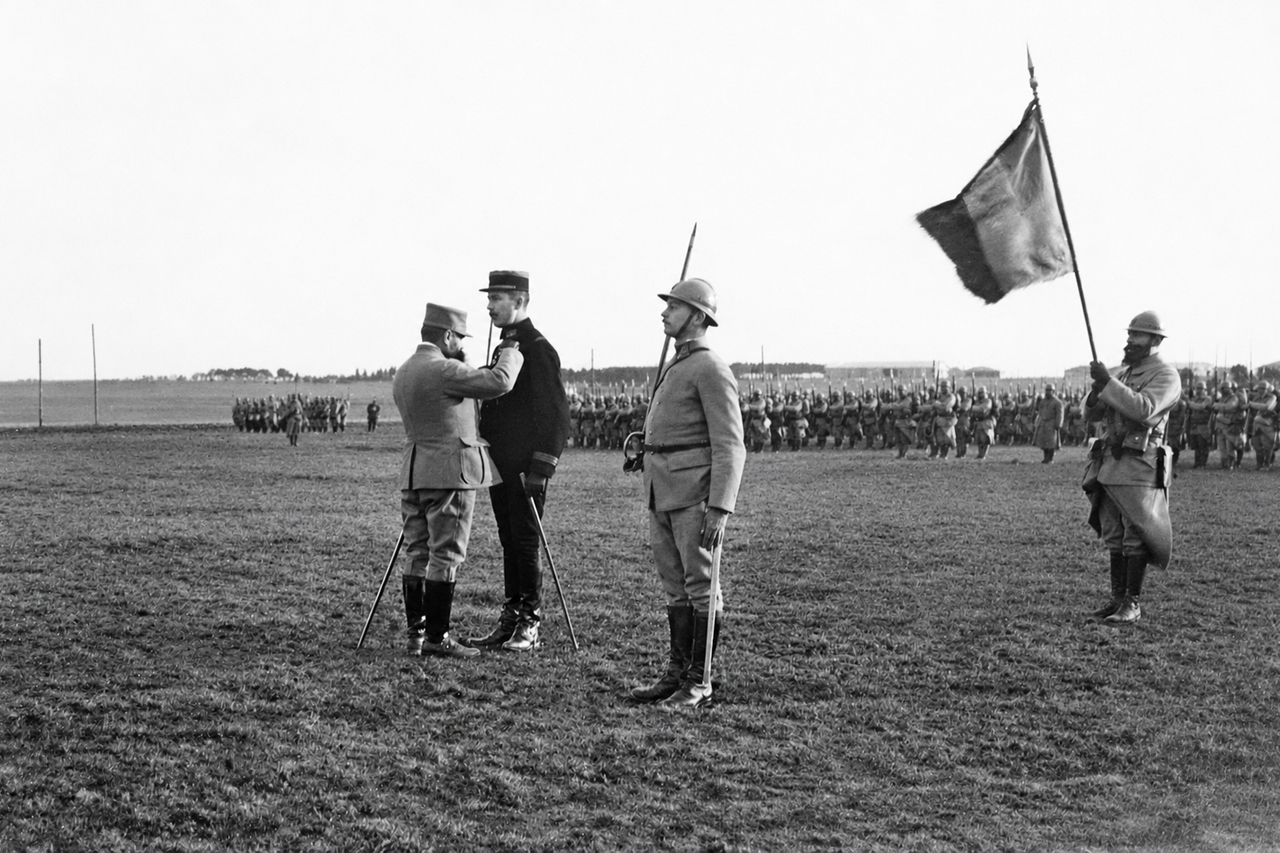
Presentation of the Knight's Cross of the Legion of Honor to Captain Bougrain by the General Reveilhac, commanding the 60 ° D.I. December 1, 1915

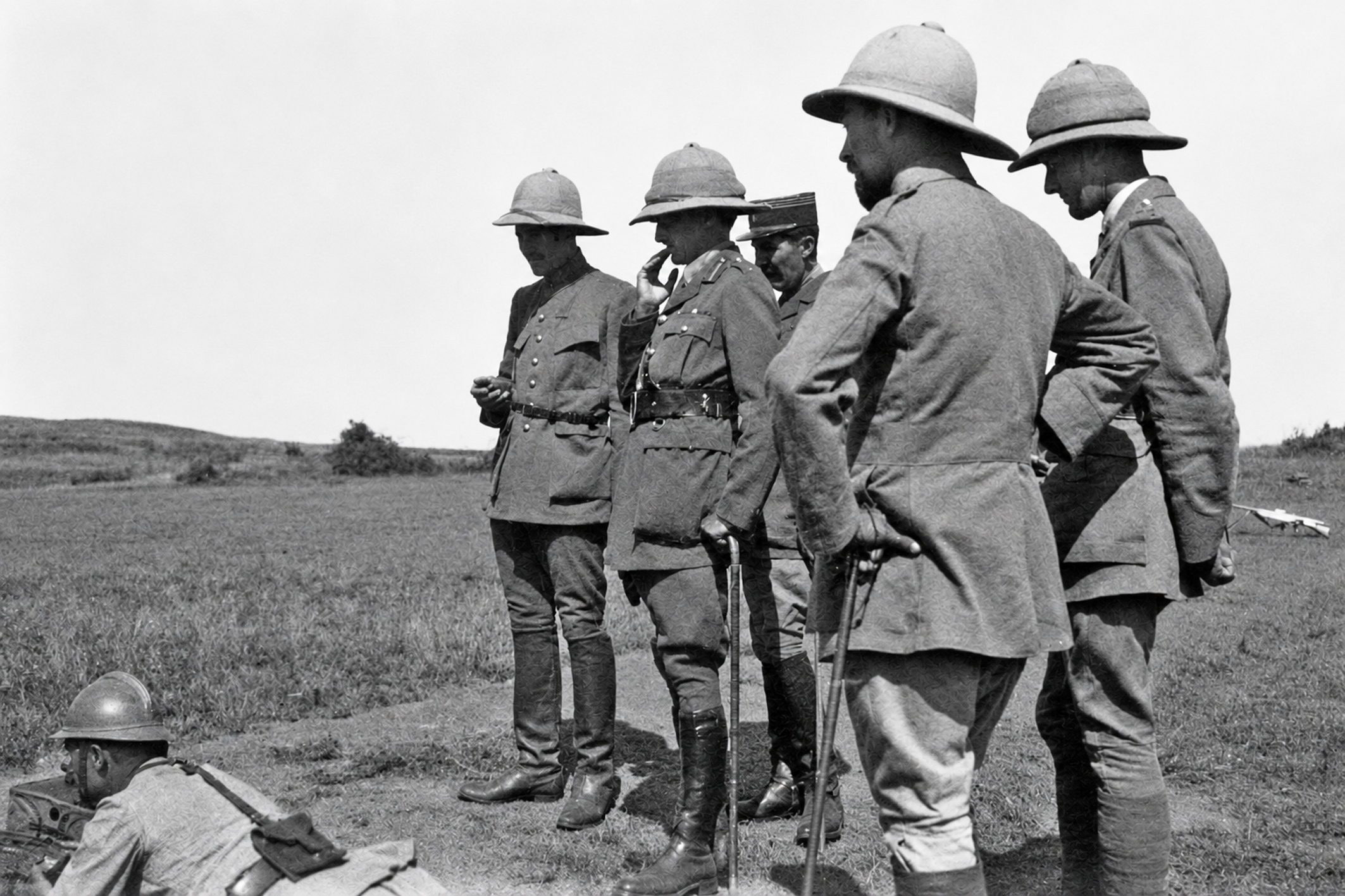
Visit to the Hortackoj Training Center. Macedonia, 5 juillet 1917.

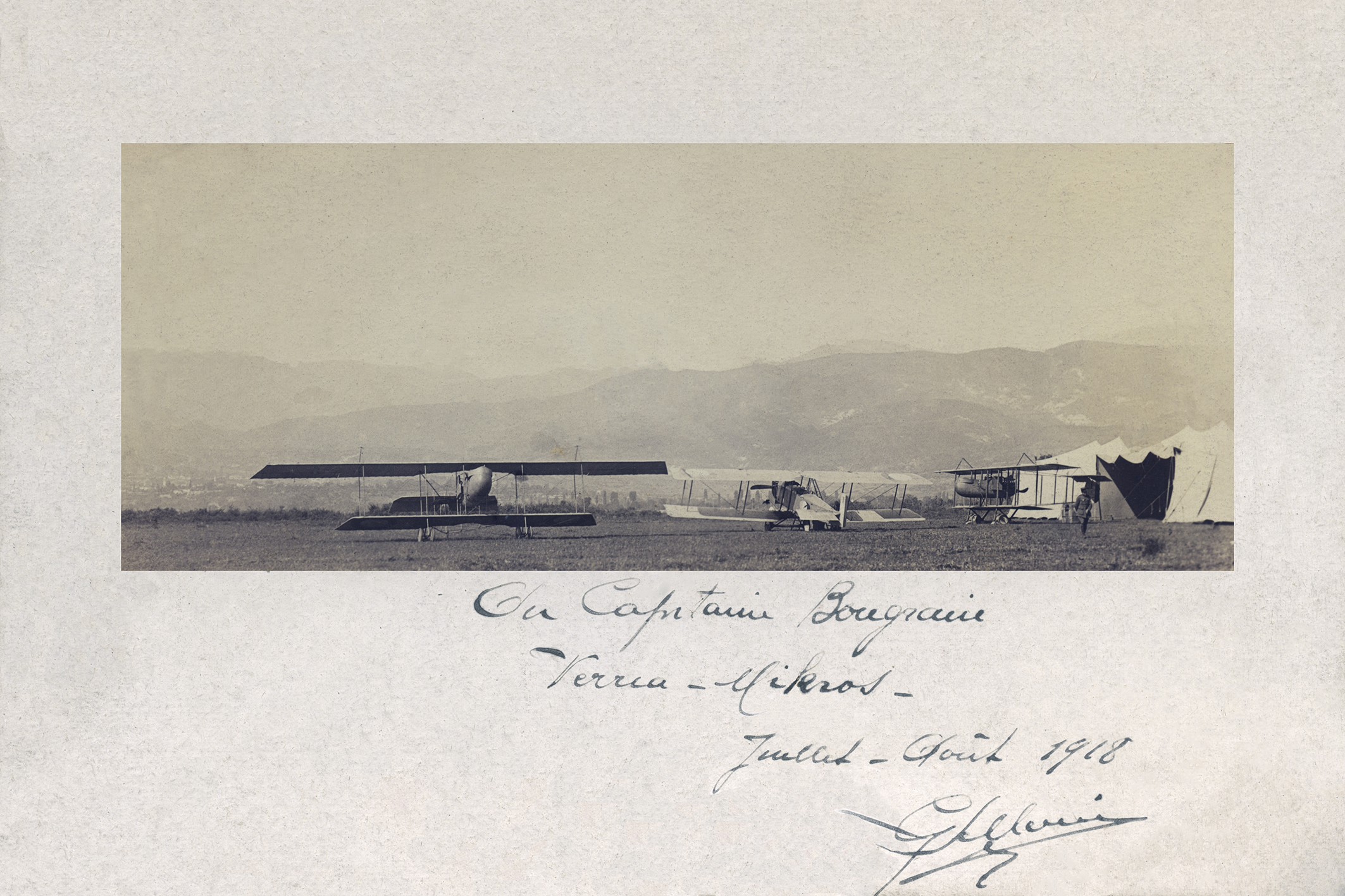
Verria-Mikros Air Base. Macedonia. 1918.

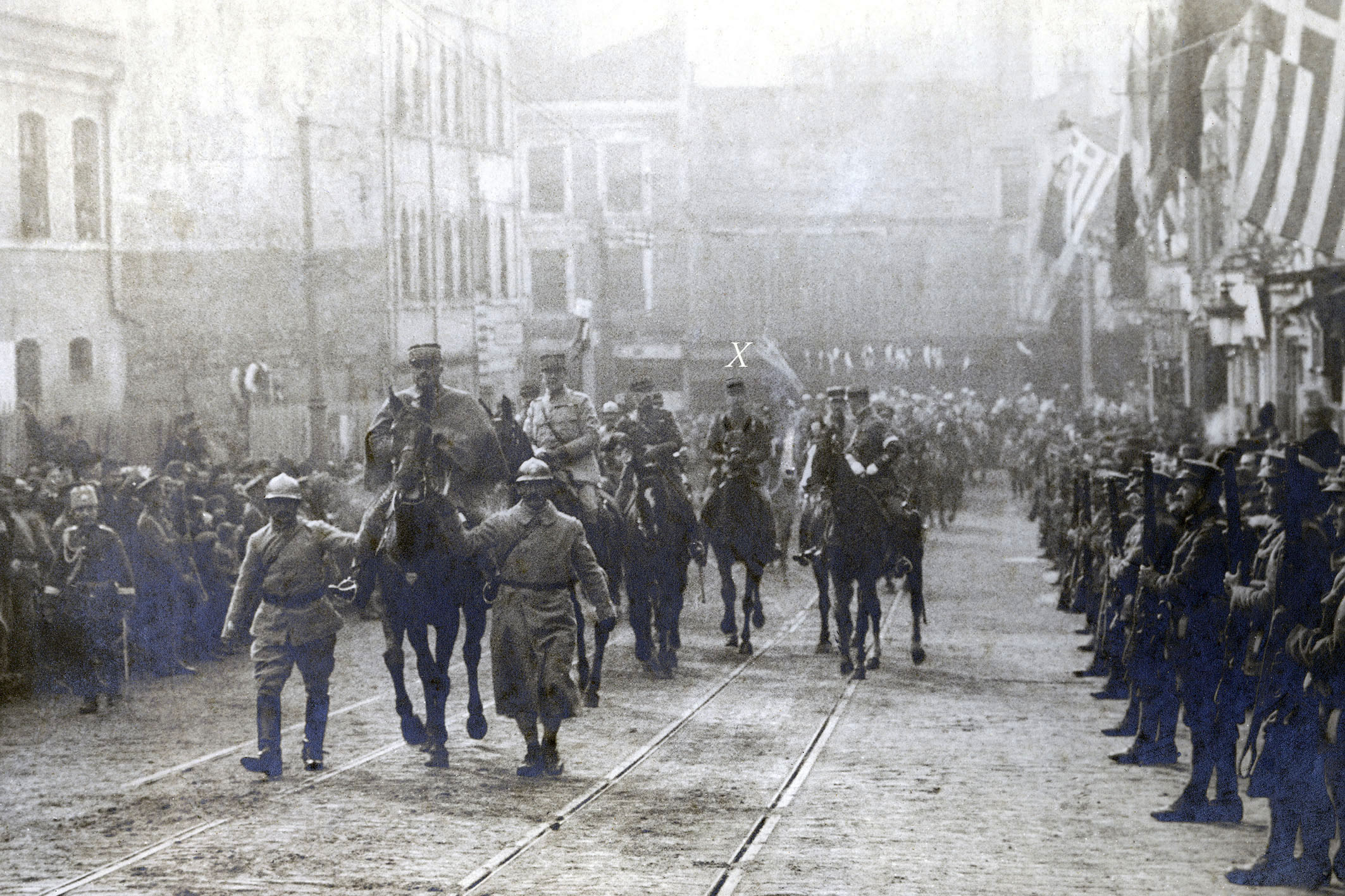
With General Franchet d´Espèrey entering Constantinople on February 8, 1919.

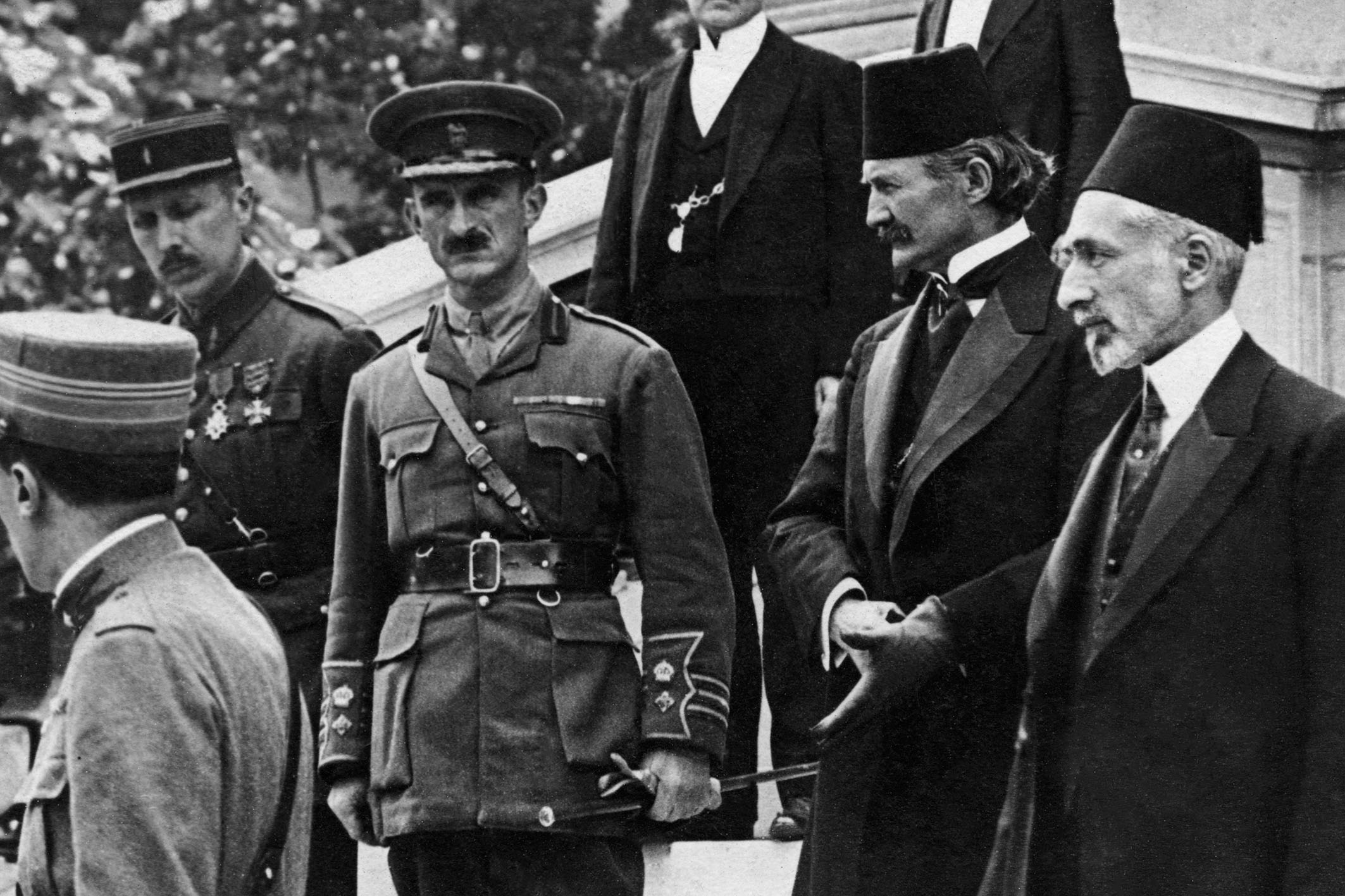
With the Ottoman delegation to the Peace Congress. 1919.

== Interwar Period ==
Promoted to squadron leader in 1919, he entered the elite École supérieure de guerre and, upon his release, was assigned to the Headquarter of the Fourth Army Corps, which he left to become a professor at the Ecole Superieur de Guerre (1922-1925). Among his pupils, Charles De Gaulle, Eugène Bridoux and Georges Loustaunau-Lacau. During a one-year leave of absence, he assumed the duties of general manager of the Montlhéry Autodrome. He then took over the direction of Studies at Saumur (1926-1931) and then became Chief of Staff of the Cavalry Inspection (General Brécard). In 1932, he became an auditor at the Center for Hautes Etudes Militaires. During this period, he defended the offensive concept of mobile and maneuverable warfare and in particular the interaction between tanks and aircraft. Colonel in 1933, he takes command of the 4th Tunisian Spahis Regiment in Sfax which has just experienced a resounding scandal (the colonel has just been murdered by his wife's lover, a lieutenant of the regiment.) In 1937, he is in command of the 4th Mechanized Light Brigade at Saint-Germain-en-Laye.

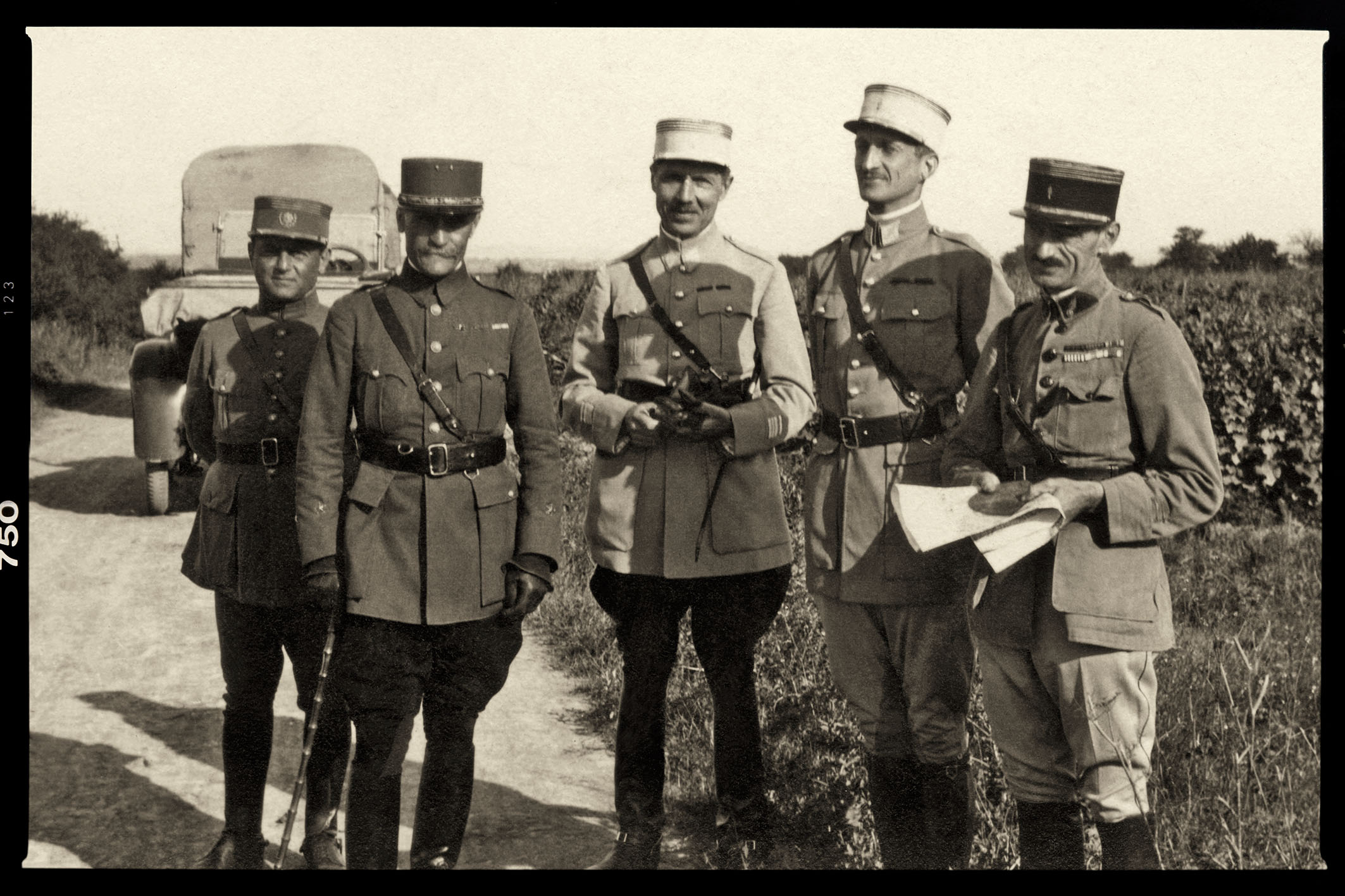
Field exercise, 1926. Application School of the Cavalry and the Train. Saumur.

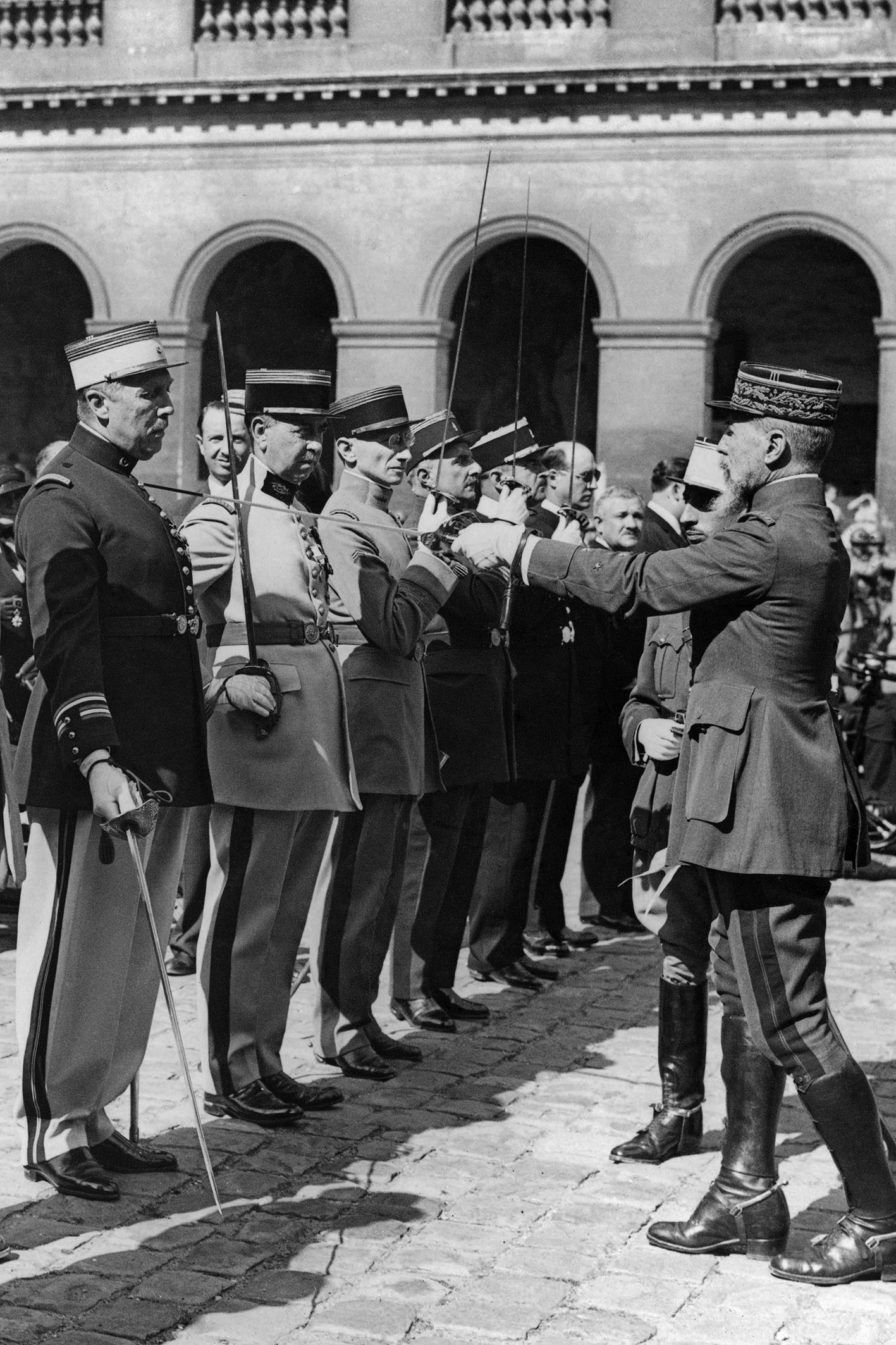
Presentation of the officer's cross of the Legion of Honor to Lt-Colonel Bougrain by the General Gouraud in the courtyard of the Invalides. July 7, 1933

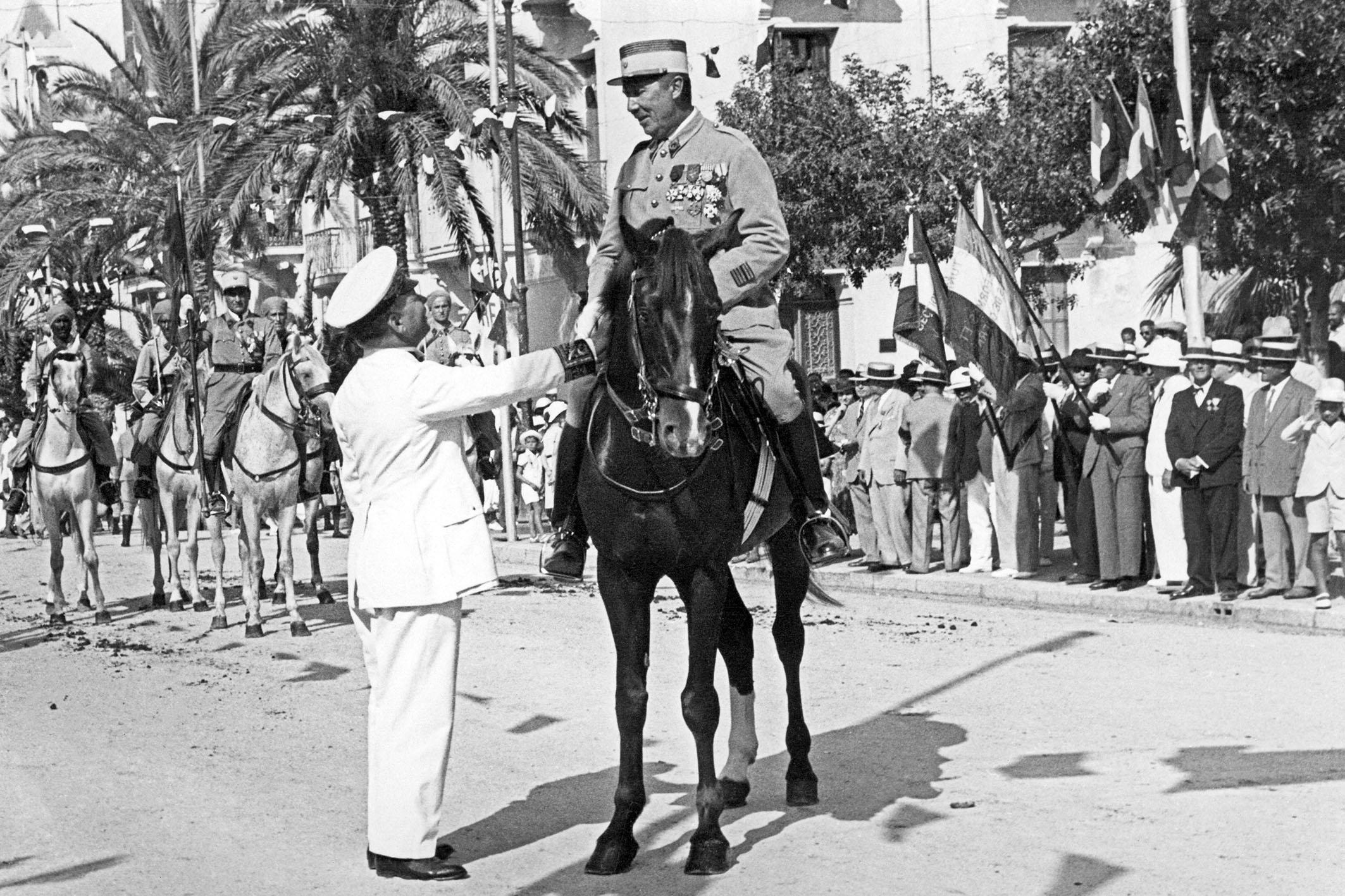
Colonel Gabriel Bougrain, commander of the 4th Tunisian Spahis Regiment and Commander of Arms. Sfax. 1934

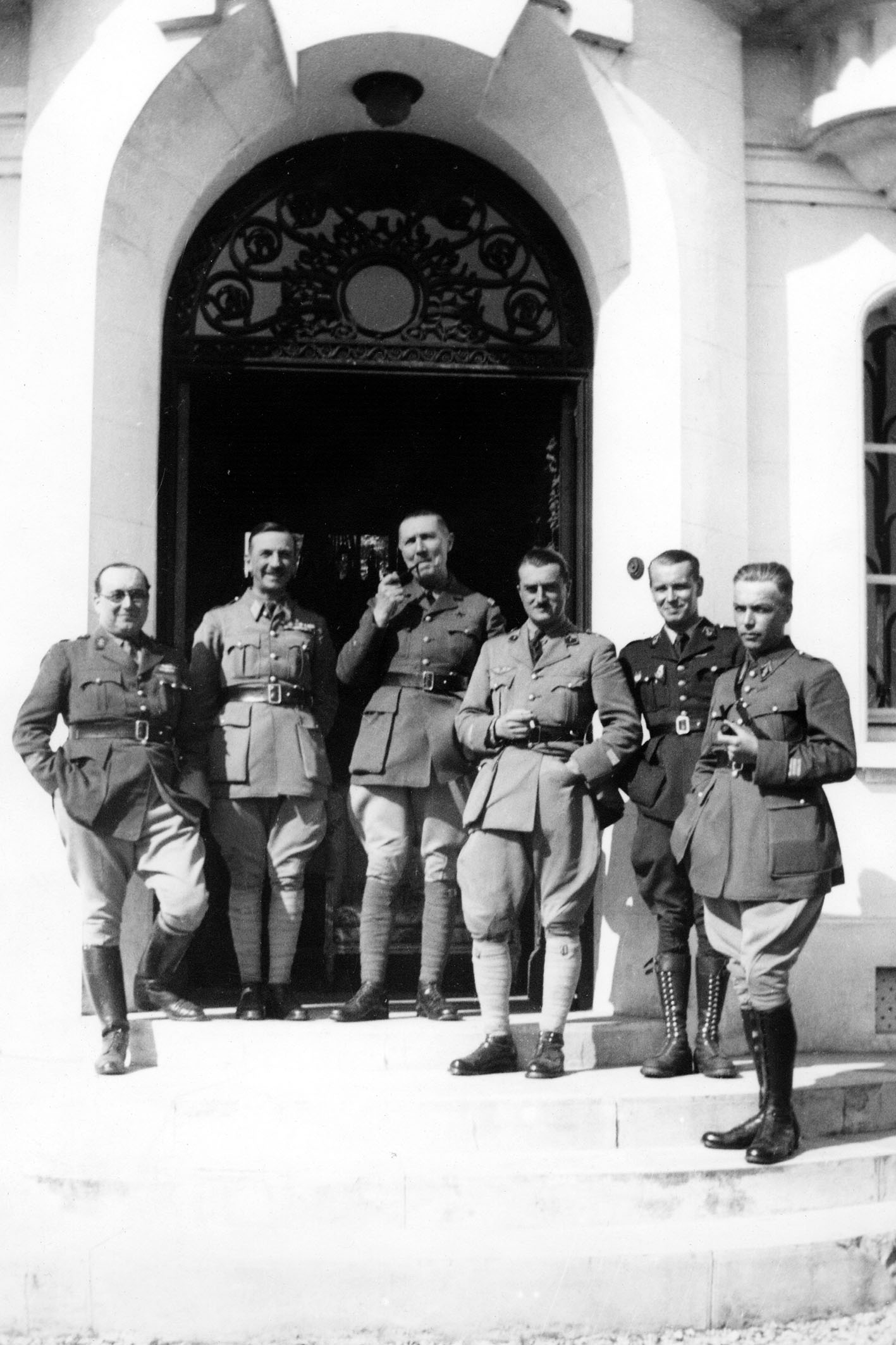
Staff of the 4th BLM, November 1939. On the steps of the Château de Vadencourt. In the center: General Bougrain, commanding the 4th BLM

== World War II ==
In January 1940, he was appointed head of the 2nd Light Mechanized Division (D.L.M.). Its division was the only major unit to bear the Croix de Lorraine as its emblem; together with the 3rd D.L.M it formed the Cavalry Corps. On 10 May, this French Corps entered Belgium and on 12 May in Hannut, engaged in the first major armoured battle in history : D.L.M. against Panzers. The two D.L.M. will resists assaults from the tanks of General Hoepner's 16th Corps - outnumbered and supported by their Air force - in an extremely violent battles that will last until 14 May. In these clashes, attacks and counter-attacks of the armoured vehicles will follow, one after another at a hellish pace, the adversaries competing with audacity and courage. The two D.L.M. lost about 100 tanks and inflicted on the Germans the loss of about one hundred and sixty tanks. This battle will continue at Gembloux, and will halt the enemy offensive allowing the First Army to retain its positions. Cited to the Order of the Army

- Officer General of great value, showed, in the most difficult circumstances, af calmness and lucidity that allowed him to lead the fight of his division with a tenacity never denied. Weygand. Croix de Guerre with palm.

- A large elite unit, engaged against a far superior enemy in numbers, the 2nd D.L.M. under the command of General Bougrain, succeeded thanks to the tenacity and the spirit of sacrifice , to break the momentum of the German Armoured divisions launched against him during the period 10 to 13 May. Allowing the Army to retain and keep their strategic positions. Weygand. Croix de Guerre with palm.

He then, took part in the violent battle at Dunkirk that allowed the evacuation of nearly 340,000 soldiers for England, 115,000 were French. On June 1, General Bougrain's division embarked on several ships to England. He himself was aboard the English trunk SS Prague, which departed Dunkirk at 9 a.m. with three thousand cavalrymen. It was attacked by twelve bombers planes, but continued its voyage despite rough seas and engine troubles. The destroyer HMS Shikari docked while still in motion, taking more than five hundred men. On the orders of the ship's captain, the remaining personnel were carried at the front of the vessel, awaiting rescue. Without any more delay, the PS Queen of Thanet, a smaller vessel, took on board the remainder of the 1st R.D.P., as well as General Bougrain, the Director of the Health Service and the medical commander Ricard. Prague then ran aground on the Sandwich Flats off the coast of Kent. Back in France and partially reconstituted, the division of General Bougrain together with the 4th D.C.R. became the core Army of Paris of General Héring, military governor of Paris. On June 12, 1940, he withdrew the troops that were under his command to the South next to the Loire valley. During the army's retreat, General Bougrain protected the left flank of the main Army Corps threatened by a vastly superior Armoured enemy forces, and then cleared himself out by precise and efficient counter-attacks, with the help of the 4th DCR, the rearguards of the Army Corps. Cited to the Order of the Army:

-Commander first a brigade of the 2nd D.L.M, then the 2nd D.L.M. itself during the Battle of Belgium and Flanders, was able to communicate to his division the burning flame that animated him and make his great unit an incomparable element of combat. Attached to the 10th C.A. from June 12 to 22, 1940 and tasked with covering a particularly threatened flank, fulfilled a difficult mission with skill, energy and tenacity. In particular, his division, which was violently attacked, succeeded in maintaining his positions with his energetic resistance and his attacks on 16 and 22 June. . Weygand. Croix de Guerre with palm.

From June 18 to 20, 1940, the 2nd D.L.M was in the vicinity of Tours to contain the German advance towards the Loire Valley. At the time armistice negotiations were announced, two allegiances clashed : that of the officers who were given the task of containing the Germans forces on the Loire border line, and that of the civil authorities of Tours who wanted to avoid warfare, fearing the destruction of their city. The "prefect" of Indre-et-Loire insisted that the main bridges over the river Loire should not be destroyed, and that all troops be withdrawn from the city of Tours. The following day, a radio broadcast announced congratulations from the French Government sent to the prefect of Indre-et-Loire, promoting Bougrain to Commander of the Legion of Honour, and to the people of Tours, for their heroic stand and defense of their city. The Army and troops positioned on the left bank of the Loire river did contain the Germans forces and fulfill part of their mission: to allow the withdrawal of men who will escape from German captivity. The 2nd D.L.M continued to fight until 25 June 1940, actual date of the ceasefire. In August 1940, General Bougrain was assigned in the 2nd Section under the terms of the armistice.

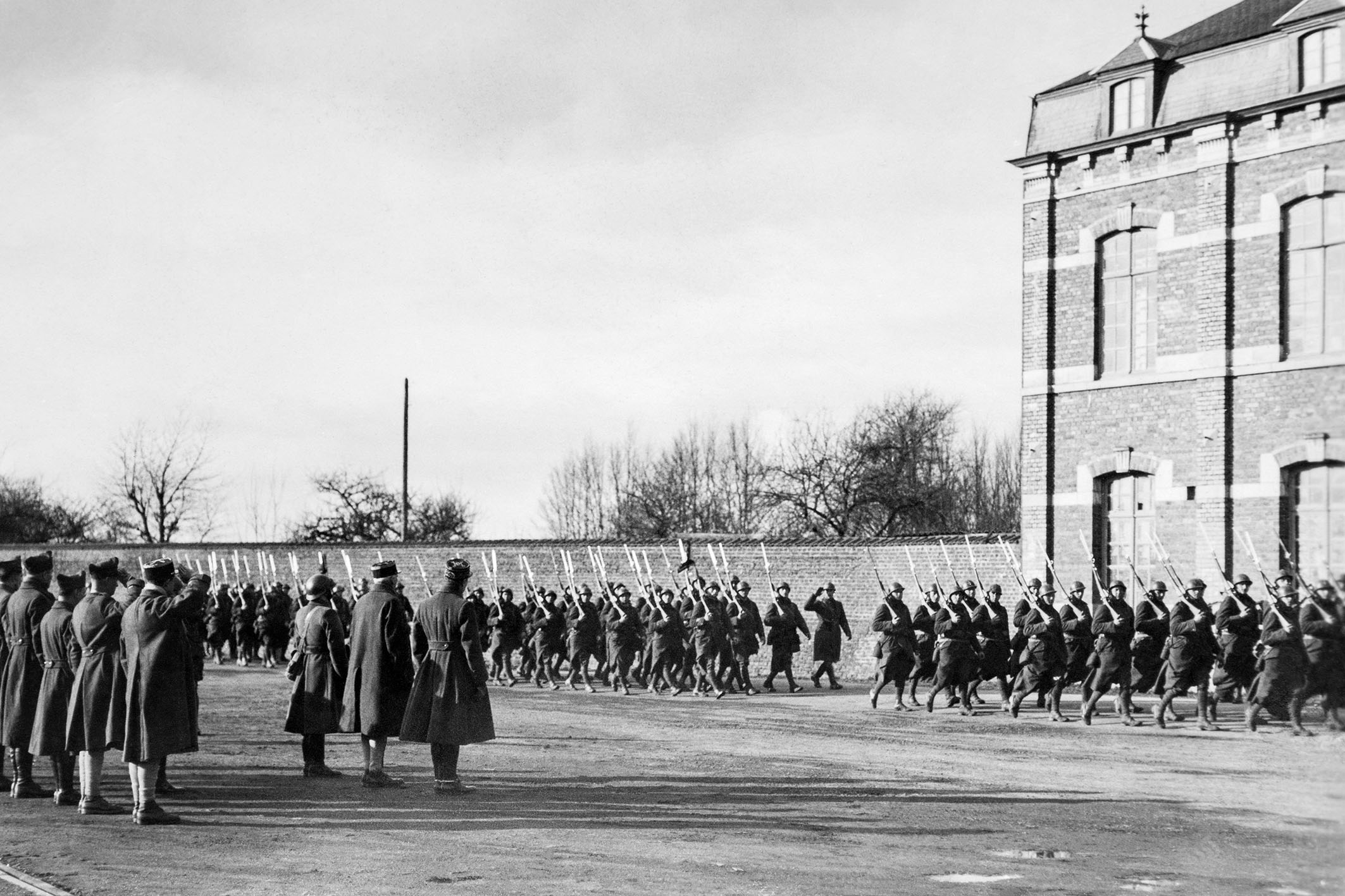
Parade of the troops of the 2nd Light Mechanized Division in front of General Bougrain. Boué (Aisne), February 24, 1940.

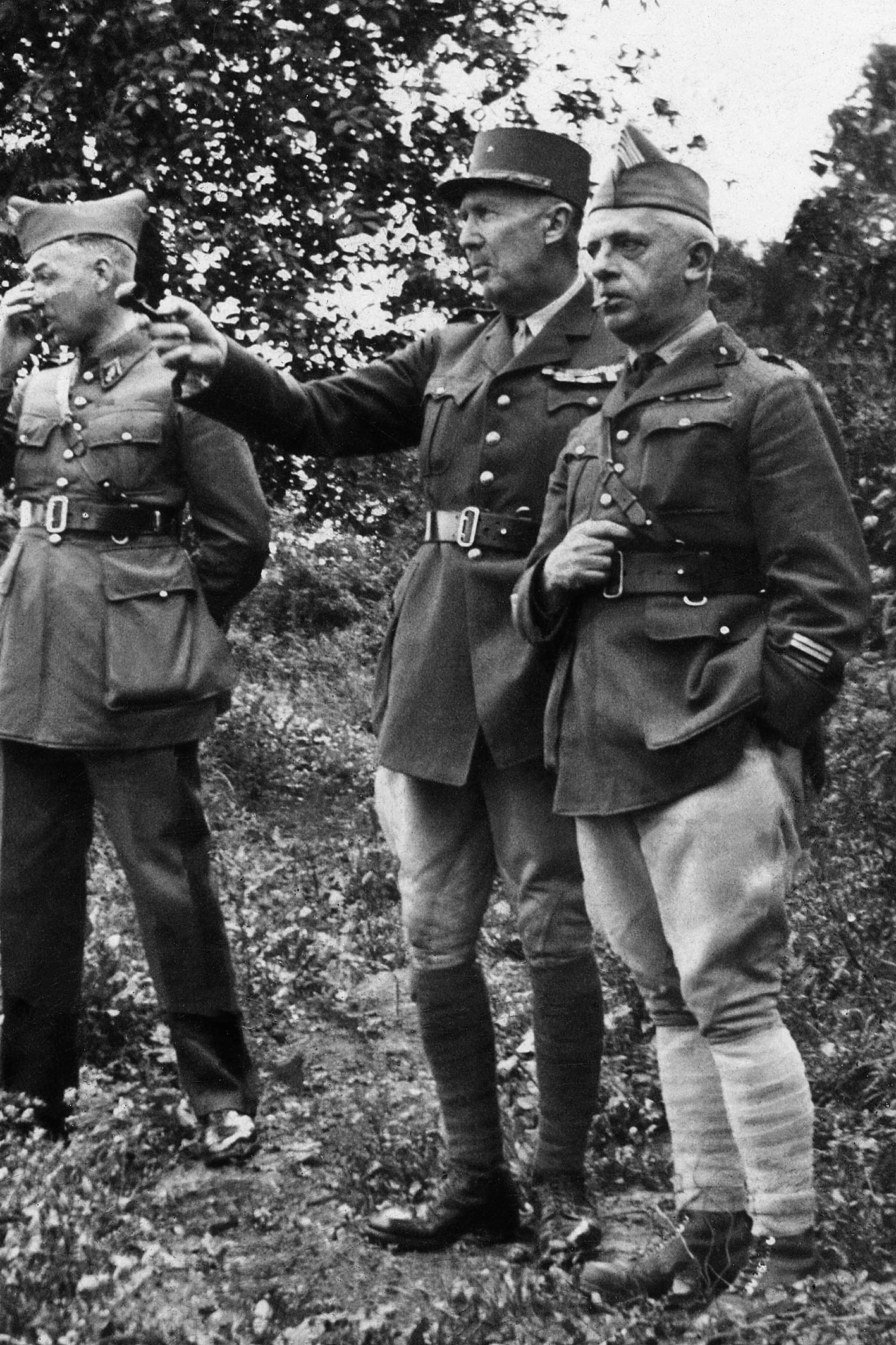
Général Gabriel Bougrain, commanding the 2nd Light Mecanized Division.

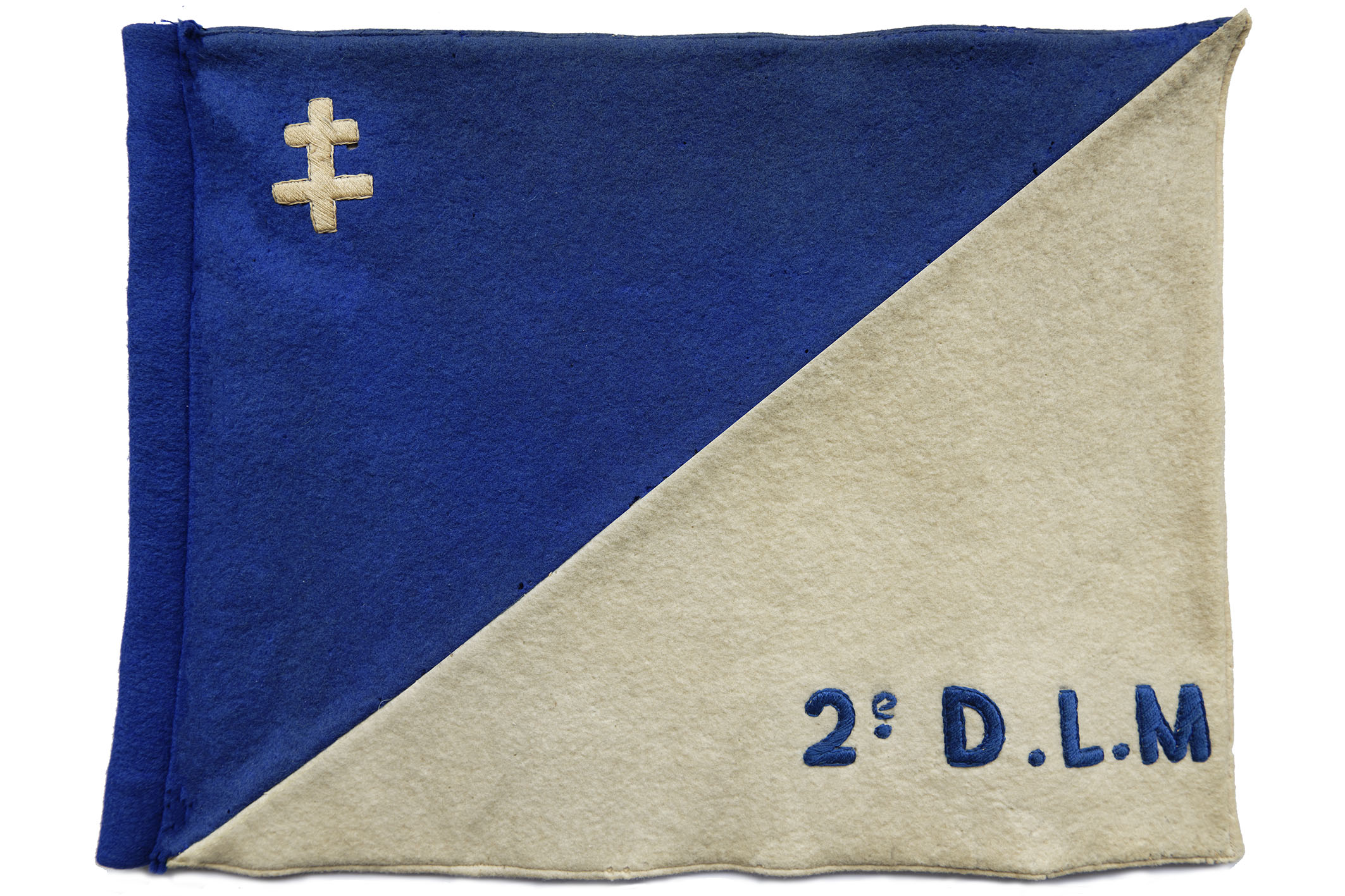
Pennant of General Bougrain commanding the 2nd D.L.M. in 1940

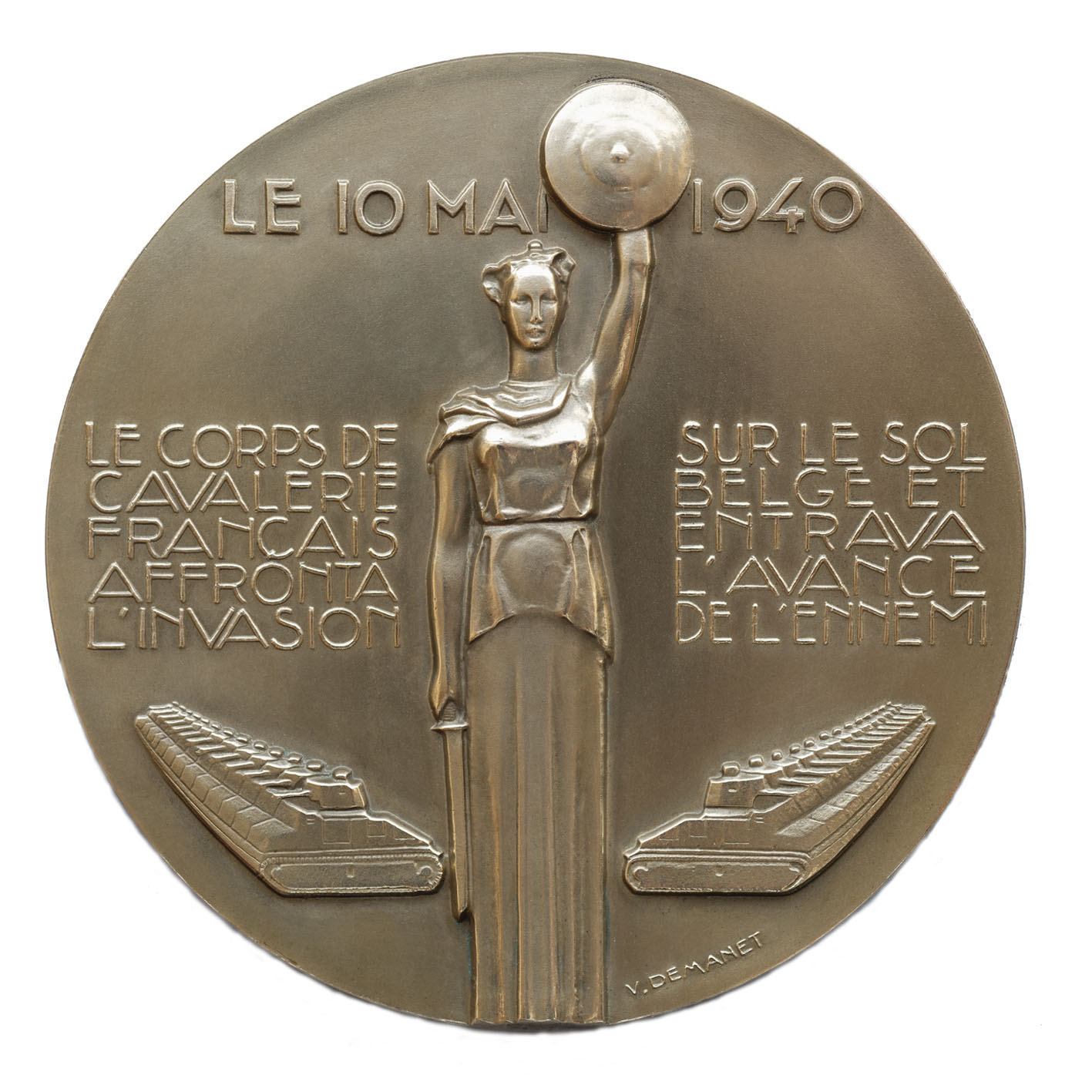
Medal struck on the occasion of the inauguration of the monument to the fallen of the Cavalry Corps erected in Jandrain (Belgium) on May 17, 1953

== Family ==
In this section links are to French wiki pages

- General Henri Garçon, grand officer of the Legion of Honor, his brother-in-law.
- Marcel Brossard de Corbigny, naval officer and explorer, officer of the Legion of Honor, his uncle.
- Louise Abel de Pujol, granddaughter of Abel de Pujol, her aunt.
- His sons: Henri, Lieutenant at the 24th Infantry Regiment, killed in action on June 9, 1940, military medal, Croix de Guerre; Yves, Chevalier of the Legion of Honor, Croix de Guerre ; Maurice-Patrice, Deputy of Saône and Loire in 1945, officer of the Legion of Honor, officer of the Resistance, Croix de Guerre.
- Lieutenant general Bertrand O'Mahony, Commander of the Legion of Honor, Grand Officer of the National Order of Merit, his nephew.

== Awards ==
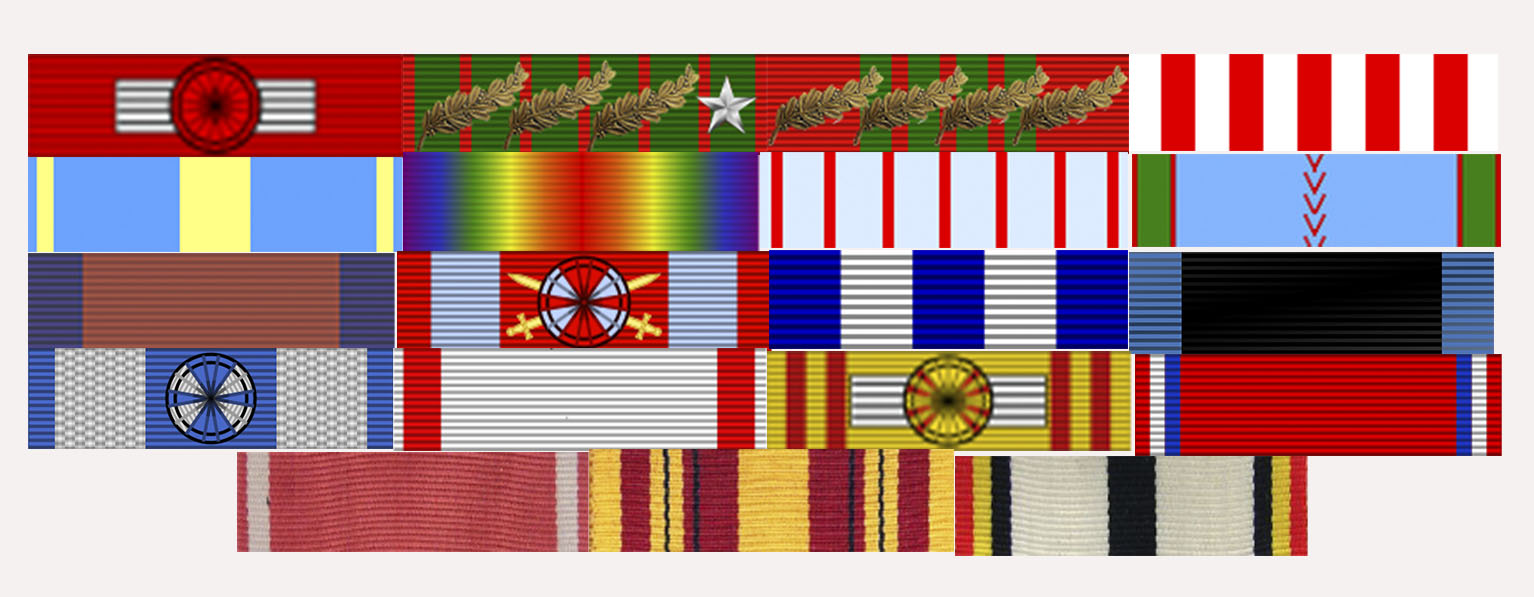

- French Legion of honnor : Knight (1915), Officer (1933), Commander(1940)
- Croix de guerre 1914–1918 (4 citations, 3 palms, 1 silver star)
- Croix de Guerre 1939–1945 (4 citations, 4 palms)
- 1914–1918 Commemorative war medal (France)
- Orient campaign medal
- 1914–1918 Inter-Allied Victory medal (France)
- Combatant's Cross
- 1939–1945 Commemorative war medal (France)
- Distinguished Service Order
- Order of the White Eagle (Serbia) with swords
- Croce al Merito di Guerra (Italy)
- War Cross (Greece)
- Order of the Crown (Romania) Officer
- Order of prince Danilo I (Monténégro)
- Nichan Iftikhar (Tunisia) Commander
- Commemorative medal of the battle of Verdun
- Cavalry corps medal
- Commemorative medal of Dunkirk
- Commemorative medal of the battle of Gembloux
