= XVIII Army Corps (Wehrmacht) =

1938–1945 German Army unit

XVIII Army Corps XVIII Mountain Corps
- XVIII. Armeekorps; XVIII. Gebirgskorps
- Active: 1 April 1938 – April 1945
- Country: Germany
- Branch: Army
- Role: Infantry/Mountain Infantry
- Size: Corps

XVIII. Armeekorps was formed in Salzburg, Austria, on 1 April 1938, following the Anschluss of Austria into the German Reich. During the life of the XVIII. Armeekorps, they took part in the Polish campaign, Fall Weiss, and the campaign in the West 1940 (Fall Gelb and Fall Rot), and performed occupation duties in France. On 30 October 1940, the Corps gave up some elements to newly forming XXXXIX. Gebirgskorps, and on 1 November, they re-designated the Korps name to XVIII. Gebirgskorps, under which it participated to Operation Marita, the invasion of Greece in spring 1941.

== Commanders ==
XVIII Armeekorps

- General der Infanterie Eugen Beyer (1 April 1938 – June 1940)
- Generalleutnant Hermann Ritter von Speck (June 1940 – 15 June 1940)
- General der Gebirgstruppe Franz Böhme (15 June 1940 – 1 November 1940)

XVIII Gebirgskorps

- General der Gebirgstruppe Franz Böhme (1 November 1940 – October 1942)
- General der Gebirgstruppe Karl Eglseer (10 December 1943 – 23 June 1944)
- General der Infanterie Friedrich Hochbaum (23 June 1944 – May 1945)

== Order of battle ==
- 3 September 1941 - 5. Gebirgs-Division, 713. Infanterie-Division, 164. Infanterie-Division
- 12 August 1942 - SS-Gebirgs-Division "Nord", Elements of 7. Gebirgs-Division, Elements of 163. Infanterie-Division
- 20 May 1944 - SS-Gebirgs-Division "Nord", Division Kräutler, 7. Gebirgs-Division
- 16 September 1944 - 7. Gebirgs-Division, SS-Gebirgs-Division "Nord", Division z.b.V. 140
- 1 March 1945 - 32. Infanterie-Division, 215. Infanterie-Division

== Area of Operation ==
Date	Army Group	Area
July 1940	12. Armee	France
May 1942	AOK Lappland	Lapland, Finland
April 1945	AOK Ostpreußen	West Prussia, Germany
