= Eugen Beyer =

Eugen Beyer (18 February 1882 in Pohrlitz (Moravia) – 25 July 1940 in Salzburg) was an Austrian Feldmarschalleutnant in the 1930s and Wehrmacht General of the Infantry during the early years of the Second World War.

From 1935 to 1938, Beyer was commander of the Bundesheer's 6th Division (stationed in Innsbruck). After the Anschluss he was incorporated into the Wehrmacht where he was given command of XVIII Corps, a post he held until shortly before his death. He was the most senior Austrian officer to transfer to the German Army.

== Promotions ==
18 August 1902	Kadett
1 November 1903	Leutnant
1 November 1909	Oberleutnant
1 May 1913	Hauptmann
1 November 1917	Major
8 July 1921	Oberstleutnant
1 June 1924	Oberst (Title)
24 February 1926	Oberst (Rank)
30 September 1931	Generalmajor
22 December 1936	Feldmarschalleutnant
1 April 1938	General der Infanterie

== Decorations & awards ==
- Iron Cross (1914), 2nd class
- Military Jubilee Cross 1848-1908
- Military Merit Cross, 3rd class with war decoration and swords (Austria-Hungary)
- Order of the Iron Crown, 3rd class with war decoration and swords (Austria)
- Silver Military Merit Medal ("Signum Laudis") with swords (Austria-Hungary)
- Bronze Military Merit Medal ("Signum Laudis") with swords (Austria-Hungary)
- Austrian War Commemorative Medal with Swords
- Honour Cross of the World War 1914/1918
- Decoration of Honour in Gold for Services to the Republic of Austria
