= Franz Böhme =

Austrian general (1885–1947)

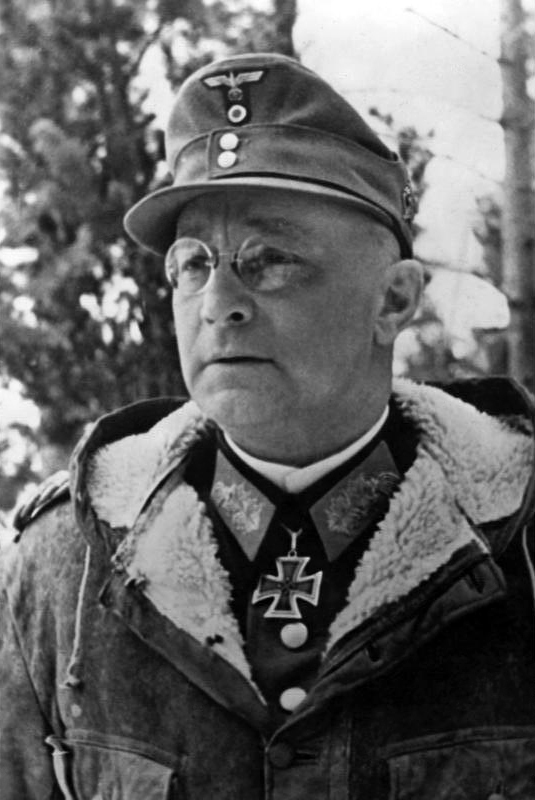
- Böhme in 1943
- Born: 15 April 1885; Zeltweg, Styria, Austria-Hungary
- Died: 29 May 1947 (aged 62); Nuremberg, Bavaria, Allied-occupied Germany
- Burial place: St. Leonhard-Friedhof, Graz, Austria
- Military career
- Allegiance: Austria-Hungary; First Austrian Republic; Nazi Germany
- Branch: Austro-Hungarian Army; Austrian Armed Forces; Wehrmacht
- Service years: 1900–1938; 1938–1945
- Rank: Generalmajor; General der Gebirgstruppe
- Commands: 32nd Infantry Division; XVIII Mountain Corps; 20th Mountain Army
- Conflicts: World War I World War II
- Awards: Knight's Cross of the Iron Cross

Franz Friedrich Böhme (15 April 1885 – 29 May 1947) was a German-Austrian soldier who served in succession with the Austro-Hungarian Army, the Austrian Army and the German Wehrmacht. He rose to the rank of general during World War II, serving as Commander of the XVIII Mountain Corps, Hitler's Plenipotentiary Commanding General (Bevollmächtigter Kommandierender General) in the Balkans, and commander-in-chief in German-occupied Norway during World War II. After the war, Böhme was transferred to U.S. custody as a defendant in the Hostages Trial on charges of having massacred thousands of Serbian civilians. He committed suicide in prison.

== Biography ==
=== Early career ===
Franz Böhme was born in Zeltweg in Styria, Austria on 15 April 1885. He entered the Austro-Hungarian Army in October 1900 as a cadet and was commissioned as a lieutenant in an infantry regiment in 1905. He served in World War I and remained in the Austrian Bundesheer after 1918, transferring to the Wehrmacht on the Anschluss with Germany in 1938, replacing Alfred Jansa as the Austrian Chief of Staff.

During the opening years of World War II, Böhme held command of the 30th Infantry Division and 32nd Infantry Division, taking part in the invasion of Poland in September 1939 and in the Battle of France in May and June 1940. On 29 June 1940, he was awarded the Knight's Cross of the Iron Cross.

=== In Serbia ===
As Commanding General and Commander of Serbia, Böhme ordered the mass murder of between 2,778 and 2,794 mostly Serb civilians (including high school pupils) in Kragujevac on 21 October 1941 (Kragujevac massacre), after a partisan assault on 22 soldiers of the 421 Korps-Nachrichten-Abteilung. On the suggestion of Harald Turner, head of the German military administration's staff in occupied Serbia, Böhme ordered the Mačva operation of September-October 1941 to "cleanse Podrinje" as retaliation to the Uprising in Serbia of July to November 1941. Böhme ordered that all villages that shot at the German Army or that had weapons found in them should be razed, and the male population between 15 and 60 arrested. On September 25, 1941, he issued an additional order: that the operation had to be ruthless to show an example to the rest of Serbia. In response to the death of 21 German soldiers near Topola on October 2, Böhme ordered that 100 prisoners be shot for every dead German soldier. From concentration camps in Šabac and Belgrade 2000 prisoners were selected (mostly Jews and communists) and executed on locality between Jabuka and Pančevo on October 9. On October 14 Böhme issued an order to arrest family-members of insurgents - wives and male relatives over the age of 15. Böhme was replaced by Paul Bader as commander of Serbia on December 5, 1941.

=== After Serbia ===
In December 1943, Böhme was appointed Deputy Commanding General of the XVIII Corps and Commander of Wehrkreis XVIII, Salzburg. On 4 June 1944, he was delegated with the leadership of the Second Panzer Army in the Balkans, succeeding Generaloberst Lothar Rendulic.

In July 1944, Böhme was transferred to the Army's High Command Leader Reserve, giving up control of the 2nd Panzer Army to General Maximilian de Angelis. Between 8 January 1945 and 8 May 1945, he served as Armed Forces Commander of Norway and Commander-in-Chief of the 20th Mountain Army.

== Trial and suicide ==
After being captured in Norway, he was brought before the Hostages Trial, a division of the Subsequent Nuremberg Trials, and charged with war crimes committed in Serbia during his control of the region in 1941. At that time, he had increased the scale of retaliatory strikes against Serbs, killing a hundred Serbs for every German soldier killed, and fifty for every German soldier wounded; this resulted in the massacre of thousands of civilians. When his extradition to Yugoslavia seemed imminent, Böhme committed suicide by jumping from the fourth story of the prison in which he was being held. His body was interred at St. Leonhard-Friedhof in Graz, Austria.

== Awards and decorations ==
- Iron Cross (1914)
  - 2nd Class (1916)
  - 1st Class (12 June 1917)
- Iron Cross (1939)
  - 2nd Class (12 September 1939)
  - 1st Class (25 September 1939)
- Order of the Cross of Liberty 1st Class with Oak leaves and Swords (Finland)
- German Cross in Gold on 10 February 1944 as General der Infanterie in the XVIII. (Gebirgs) Armeekorps
- Knight's Cross of the Iron Cross on 29 June 1940 as Generalleutnant commander of 32. Infanterie-Division

Military offices
Preceded by Generalmajor Kurt von Briesen	Commander of 30. Infanterie-Division; 1 July 1939 – 19 July 1939	Succeeded by General der Infanterie Kurt von Briesen
Preceded by Generaloberst Nikolaus von Falkenhorst	Commander of 32. Infanterie-Division; 19 July 1939 – 1 October 1939	Succeeded by Generalleutnant Eccard Freiherr von Gablenz
Preceded by Generalleutnant Eccard Freiherr von Gablenz	Commander of 32. Infanterie-Division; 1 December 1939 – 15 June 1940	Succeeded by Generalleutnant Wilhelm Bohnstedt
Preceded by Generalleutnant Hermann Ritter von Speck	Commander of XXXXIII Army Corps; 31 May 1940 - 17 June 1940	Succeeded by General der Infanterie Gotthard Heinrici
Preceded by Generaloberst Dr. Lothar Rendulic	Commander of 2. Panzer-Armee; 24 June 1944 – 17 July 1944	Succeeded by General der Artillerie Maximilian de Angelis
Preceded by General Dr. Lothar Rendulic	Commander of 20. Gebirgsarmee; 8 January 1945 – 7 May 1945	Succeeded by none
