= Rudolf Sintzenich =

- Born: 13 July 1889; Munich, Kingdom of Bavaria, German Empire
- Died: 24 December 1948 (aged 59); Munich, Bavaria, Allied-occupied Germany
- Military career
- Allegiance: Nazi Germany
- Branch: Army (Wehrmacht)
- Service years: 1908–1945
- Rank: Generalleutnant
- Commands: 33rd Infantry Division; 132nd Infantry Division; 147th Reserve Division
- Conflicts: World War I World War II: Invasion of Poland; Battle of France; Invasion of Yugoslavia; Operation Barbarossa; Battle of Kiev (1941); Siege of Sevastopol (1941-1942)
- Awards: Knight's Cross of the Iron Cross

Rudolf Sintzenich (13 July 1889 – 24 December 1948) was a general in the Wehrmacht of Nazi Germany during World War II who commanded several divisions. He was a recipient of the Knight's Cross of the Iron Cross.

== Awards and decorations (excerpt) ==
- Iron Cross (1914), 2nd and 1st Class
- Military Merit Order (Bavaria), 4th Class with Swords
- Wound Badge (1914) in Black
- Honour Cross of the World War 1914/1918 with Swords
- Sudetenland Medal
- West Wall Medal
- Repetition Clasp 1939 to the Iron Cross 1914, 2nd and 1st Class
- War Merit Cross (1939), 2nd Class with Swords
- Eastern Front Medal
- Order of the Crown of King Zvonimir, I. Class with Star
- Knight's Cross of the Iron Cross on 15 August 1940 as Generalmajor and commander of 33. Infanterie-Division

Military offices
Preceded by General der Artillerie Hermann Ritter von Speck	Commander of 33rd Infantry Division; 29 April 1940 – 5 October 1940	Succeeded by General der Panzertruppe Friedrich Kühn
Preceded by none	Commander of 132nd Infantry Division; 5 October 1940 – 11 January 1942	Succeeded by General der Artillerie Fritz Lindemann
