= Battle of Hannut =

1940 WWII battle in Belgium

- Part of the Battle of Belgium in World War II
Date	12–14 May 1940
Location	Hannut, Belgium 50.6667°N 5.0833°E
Result	See § Aftermath

Belligerents
France; Belgium; Netherlands (Note: The Netherlands contributed lightly armed infantry units retreating from Dutch territory. Also committed the Dutch Air Force on a few ineffective and costly missions.)	Germany

Commanders and leaders
René Prioux; Gabriel Bougrain; Jean-Léon-Albert Langlois	Erich Hoepner; Horst Stumpff; Johann Joachim Stever

Strength
2 armoured divisions 20,800 personnel 600 AFVs (Note: Gunsburg gives these numbers: 2nd DLM: 400 officers, 10,000 men, 300 AFVs 3rd DLM: some 400 officers,10,000 men, 300 AFVs)	2 Panzer divisions 25,927 personnel 618 tanks (some sources say 674); 108 artillery pieces (Note: Gunsburg gives these numbers, including Befehlspanzer: 3rd Panzer Division: 400 officers, 13,187 men, 343 tanks, 48 artillery pieces, 4th Panzer Division: 335 officers, 12,005 men, 331 tanks, 60 artillery pieces); 1,252 aircraft

Casualties and losses
121 tanks destroyed/damaged or abandoned	52 tanks destroyed 111 tanks damaged
- Hannut, a municipality of Belgium in the Walloon Region of Liège Province

The Battle of Hannut was a Second World War battle fought during the Battle of Belgium which took place between 12 and 14 May 1940 at Hannut in Belgium. It was the largest tank battle in the campaign. It was also the largest clash of tanks in armoured warfare history at the time.

The primary purpose of the Germans was to tie down the strongest elements of the French First Army and keep it away from the main German attack by Army Group A through the Ardennes, as laid down in the German operational plan Fall Gelb (Case Yellow), by General Erich von Manstein. The German breakout of the Ardennes was scheduled for 15 May, five days after the German attacks on the Netherlands and Belgium. The delay was to entice the Allies into believing the main thrust would, like the Schlieffen Plan in World War I, come through Belgium and then down into France. When the Allied armies advanced into Belgium according to the Dyle Plan, they would be tied down by German offensive operations in eastern Belgium at Hannut and Gembloux. With the flank of the First Army exposed, the Germans could thrust to the English Channel which would encircle and destroy the Allied forces. For the French, the plan in Belgium was to prepare for a prolonged defence at Gembloux, about 34 km (21 mi) west of Hannut. The French sent two armoured divisions forward, to conduct a delaying action against the German advance and give the rest of the First Army time to dig in at Gembloux.

The Germans reached the Hannut area just two days after the start of the invasion of Belgium but the French defeated several German attacks and fell back on Gembloux as planned. The Germans succeeded in tying down substantial Allied forces, which might have participated in the Battle of Sedan, the attack through the Ardennes. The Germans failed to neutralise the French First Army completely at Hannut, despite inflicting significant casualties. The French forces successfully delayed the German advance while allowing the First Army to situate itself at Gembloux, where, a couple of days later, the German advance lost over a third of its armor in combat.

The French once again scored tactical successes at the Battle of Gembloux from 14–15 May. In the aftermath of that battle, although seriously damaged, the First Army was able to retreat to Lille, where it delayed the Germans in the Siege of Lille and was instrumental in the re-embarkation of the British Expeditionary Force, French and Belgian troops at the Evacuation of Dunkirk.

== Background ==
=== Allied intentions ===
The Allied supreme commander General Maurice Gamelin committed his First Army Group, under General Gaston Billotte, and its strongest Army, the French 1st Army under General Georges Blanchard with the fully mechanised Corps de Cavalerie (Cavalry Corps), commanded by General René Prioux, to advance into Belgium to support the large but more lightly equipped Belgian Army. Gamelin expected the German attack to break the Belgian defences at the Albert Canal line rapidly—the Belgians had in any case indicated they would after four days withdraw to the planned allied front in central Belgium, the "Dyle Line" between Antwerp and Namur—and sought to quickly establish an entrenched front line centred on Gembloux, just north of Namur, to check what Gamelin foresaw as the main enemy effort (Schwerpunkt) of the campaign: an attempt to break through the "Gembloux Gap" between the rivers Dyle and Meuse with a concentration of armoured forces. As Belgium, the Netherlands, and Luxembourg would remain neutral until the German invasion of those countries (Fall Gelb), it had proven impossible to adequately prepare positions for the French 1st Army. Therefore, the Cavalry Corps was given the mission to execute a delaying battle, somewhere between Gembloux and Maastricht (the likely crossing-point, where the Albert Canal connected to it, over the eastern bend of the Meuse), to prevent the enemy from reaching the Gembloux area until the eighth day of an invasion and to allow the 1st Army sufficient time to dig in.

The Cavalry Corps had been created on 26 December 1939, containing both then existing armoured divisions of the Cavalry, the 1re Division Légère Mécanique ("1st Mechanised Light Division") and the 2e DLM. On 26 March 1940 however, 1st DLM was given the mission, in case of an invasion, to establish a connection with the Dutch Army near Breda; this experienced active division was therefore removed from the Cavalry Corps. It was replaced by the 3e DLM, recently constituted on 1 February, manned with reservists and still insufficiently trained. Nevertheless, Prioux still considered his forces sufficient to either contest a river-crossing at Maastricht, or wage a manoeuvre battle or, as a third alternative, defend an improvised line. He was at liberty to choose any option, provided the enemy was kept from Gembloux long enough. He decided to keep all possibilities open and act as the situation would demand.

=== German intentions ===
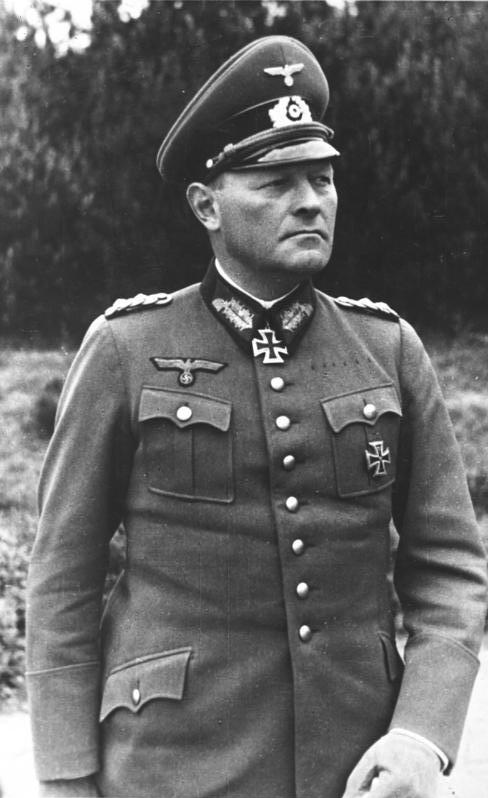
General Hoepner commanded Army Corps XVI at the Battle of Hannut and the Gembloux gap offensive

The German plan for this sector called for an assault by airborne and shock troops to take Fort Eben-Emael and the Meuse and Albert Canal bridges, thus opening a way through the Dutch and Belgian defences for the 4. Panzerdivision (4th Panzer Division), and bring the Albert Canal defensive line to a premature collapse. Once this breach was made, General Erich Hoepner's XVI Army Corps, and Army Group B would assume control of the 4th Panzer Division, the 3rd Panzer Division and the 20th Infantry Division. Hoepner's mission was to quickly launch his Corps from the bridgehead, seize the area around Gembloux before the French infantry divisions could entrench themselves there, and by thus conforming to the worst fears of the French High Command draw all modern Allied forces and their reserves to the north, away from the main thrust through the Ardennes. This would enable the German Army to cut the French First Army, the BEF and the Belgians off by a swift advance to the English Channel leading to a giant encirclement. The action was basically a feint to tie down the Allies in the north so they could not interfere with the main thrust through the Ardennes.

== Opposing forces ==
=== Allied forces ===
The Battle of Hannut became the largest tank battle of the campaign. The French DLMs had two Brigades Légères Mécaniques each.

One of these, the "combat" brigade, contained two tank regiments, each regiment having 2 medium tank squadrons equipped with the SOMUA S35, and 2 light tank squadrons fielding the Hotchkiss H35. Each squadron's organic strength was 44 S35s and 43 H35s; also eight armoured command vehicles were present.

The other brigade contained a reconnaissance regiment, equipped with 44 Panhard 178 armoured cars organised in two squadrons, and a mechanised infantry regiment equipped with 126 Laffly S20TL 6-wheeled truck personnel carriers. Three organic AMR 35 (Automitrailleuse de Reconnaissance) squadrons of 22 tanks each were also included as were three armoured command vehicles. The 2e DLM used AMR 35 tanks for this rôle, but as the production of this light tank had been discontinued, 3e DLM employed H35s instead.

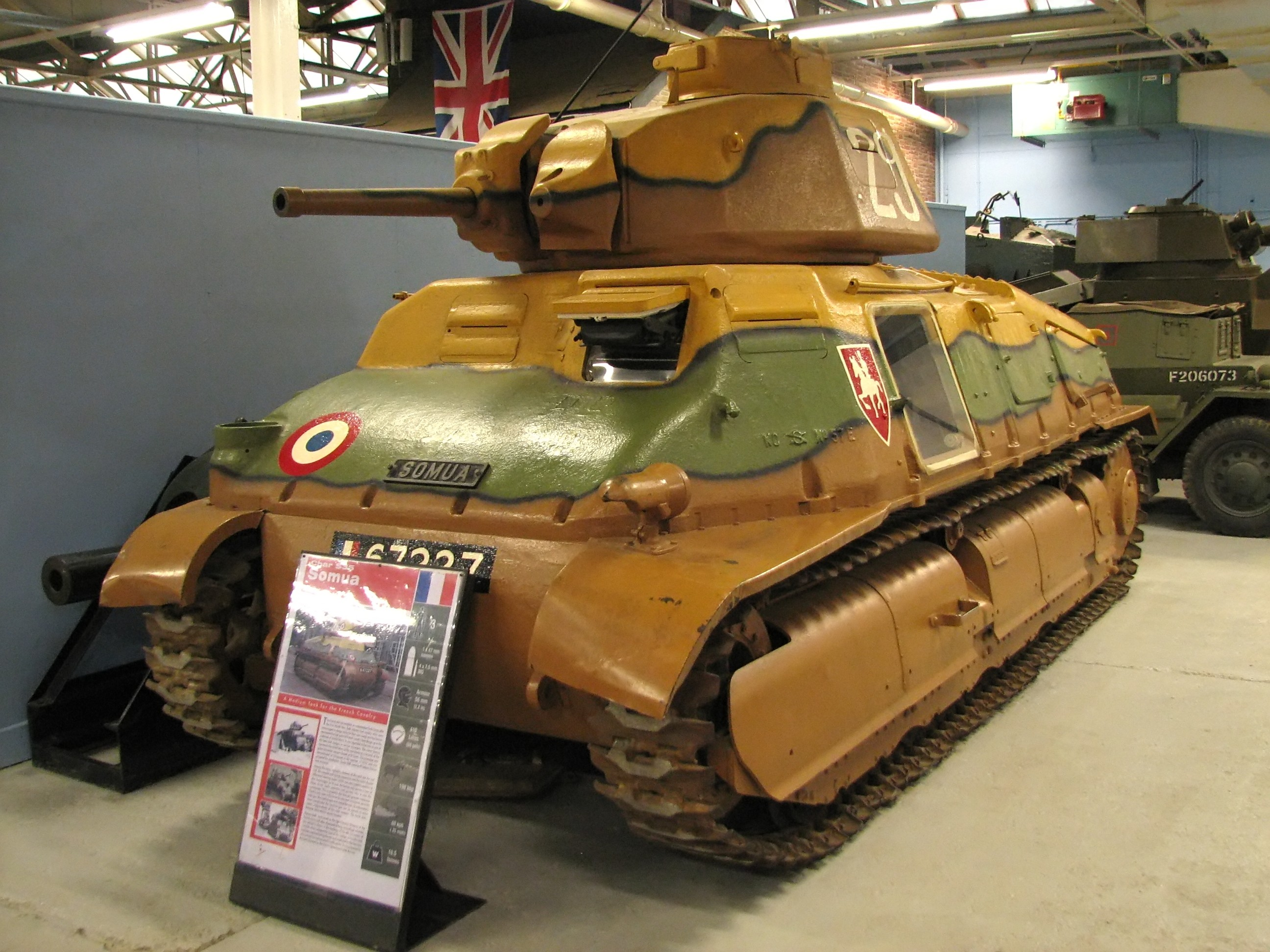
SOMUA S35 at the Bovington Tank Museum. It outmatched the Panzer I to IIIs in terms of armour and firepower.

Each DLM thus had an organic strength of 260 tanks and 44 Panhards.

The entire Cavalry Corps (France) had a total of 520 tanks: 176 SOMUA S35s, 172 Hotchkiss H35s, 66 AMR 35s + 66 H35s and 88 P 178s, including the organic matériel reserve.

The 3e DLM used modifié 39 versions, a swifter, improved version of the H35s, that today is often referred to as the "H 39", but also had a single AMR squadron of 22 vehicles of the slower original batch of four hundred, that were exclusively present in 2e DLM. Most Hotchkiss tanks of both versions were fitted with the short, 37 mm 21 caliber SA 18 gun, which proved a poor antitank weapon. Some platoon and squadron commander's vehicles had been fitted with the more powerful 37 mm 35 caliber SA 38 gun, totalling about a fifth of the total number of Hotchkiss tanks.

The organisation of 2e DLM was: 3e BLM as a combat brigade, with 13e Dragons and 29e Dragons tank regiments; the second brigade was 4e BLM with 8e Cuirassiers reconnaissance regiment and 1er Dragons mechanised infantry regiment. The 3e DLM had 5e BLM with 1er Cuirassiers and 2e Cuirassiers tank regiments and 6e BLM with 12e Cuirassiers reconnaissance regiment and 11e Dragons mechanised infantry regiment.

=== German forces ===
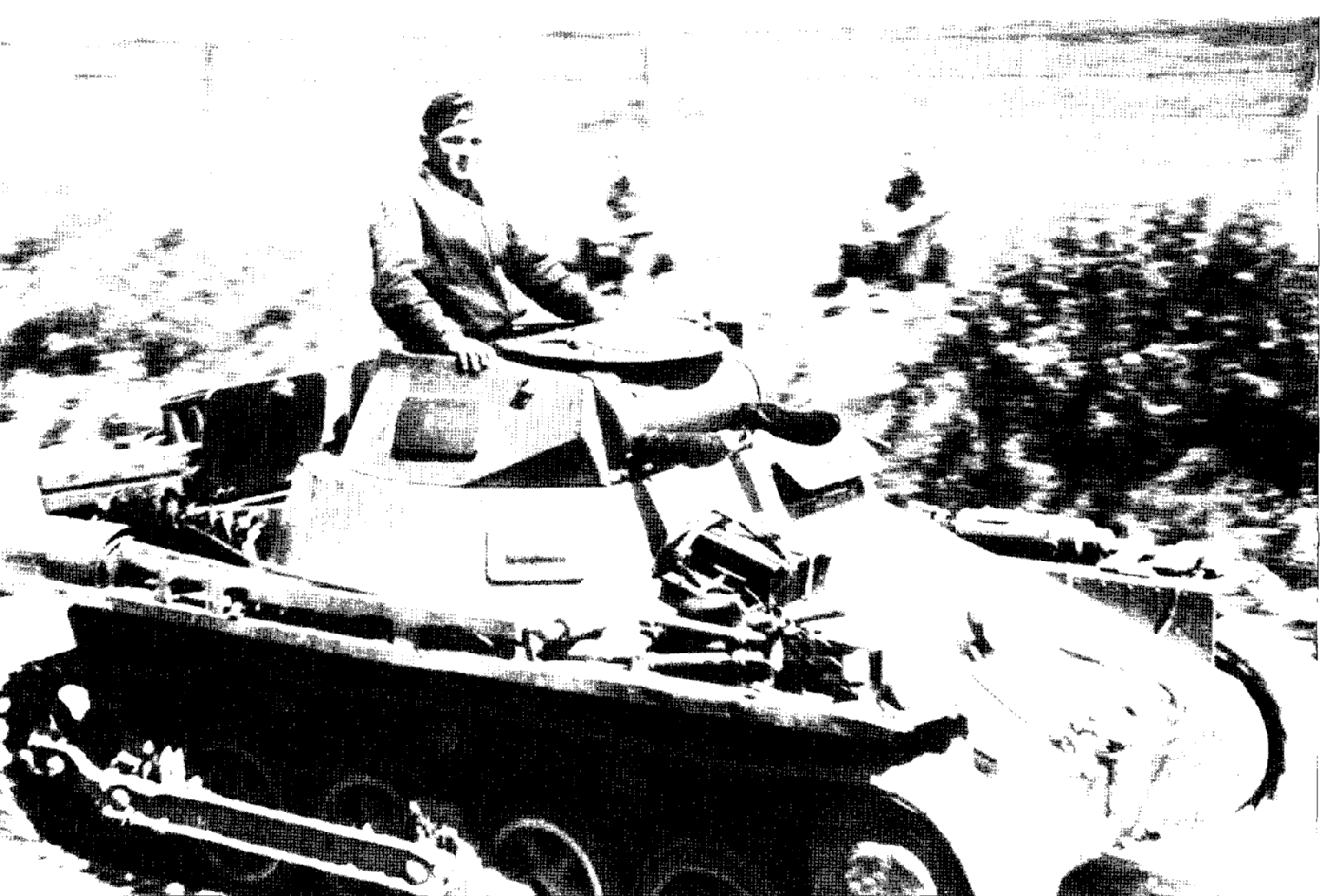
Panzer I Ausf. A during the invasion of Belgium.

Like their French counterparts the German armoured divisions each had an armoured brigade (Panzer-Brigade) with two tank regiments (Panzer-Regimenter). The latter were divided into two tank battalions (Panzer-Abteilungen); each tank battalion had, apart from a staff company, two light companies of nineteen battle tanks, in theory mainly equipped with the Panzerkampfwagen III, and a medium company of fifteen battle tanks using the Panzerkampfwagen IV. Due to a shortage of these types, the positions were actually in majority filled with the light Panzerkampfwagen II and even Panzerkampfwagen I.

The exact numbers of each type on 10 May available to the German armoured divisions are known: 3rd Pz. Div. had 314 battle tanks in its 3. Panzer-Brigade consisting of 5. and 6. Panzer-Regiment: 117 PzKpfw Is, 129 PzKpfw IIs, 42 PzKpfw IIIs and 26 PzKpfw IVs; 4th Pz. Div. had 304 battle tanks in its 5. Panzer-Brigade consisting of 35. and 36. Panzerregiment: 135 PzKpfw Is, 105 PzKpfw IIs, 40 PzKpfw IIIs and 24 PzKpfw IVs.

XVI. Armeekorps thus had a total of 618 tanks: 252 PzKpfw Is, 234 PzKpfw IIs, 82 PzKpfw IIIs and 50 PzKpfw IVs. Besides these battle tanks, 3rd Pz. Div. had 27 Befehlspanzer tracked command vehicles with only machine-gun armament and 4th Pz. Div. ten. Each division also had about 56 armoured cars. Most PzKpfw IIs of XVI Armeekorps had not yet been uparmoured to the new 30 mm standard and were thus vulnerable to even the French 37 mm L/21 gun.

As the French mechanised infantry regiments had three mechanised infantry battalions, total infantry strength of the Corps de Cavalerie (CC) was six battalions. XVI. Armeekorps had seven motorised infantry battalions. The French units were only lightly equipped with antitank-guns: twelve 25 mm and eight 47 mm SA 37 guns per division; and anti-aircraft guns: six 25 mm guns per division. Also, there was an imbalance in artillery: the French Mechanised Light Divisions each had 36 pieces against 68 (including 24 7.5 cm leichtes Infanteriegeschütz 18) per Panzerdivision. This was not set off by Corps artillery; the Germans had four attached artillery regiments and a heavy battery; the French CC only two 75 mm field gun regiments (and a group of twelve 25 mm antitank-guns) as corps troops.

The specialized VIII. Fliegerkorps of the Luftwaffe, with some 300 Junkers Ju 87 dive bombers and 42 Henschel Hs 123 biplanes, plus some 130 Messerschmitt Bf 109 fighter aircraft, stood ready to support the Panzers. The IV. Fliegerkorps and IX. Fliegerkorps added some 280 medium bombers and over 500 Messerschmitt Bf 109 and Messerschmitt Bf 110 heavy fighters, some of which would also be at Hoepner's disposal.

== Prelude to engagement ==
=== Prioux's mistake ===
Billotte suggested to Prioux that he might move his armour further east to support the Belgian Army. But Prioux, unimpressed by the Belgian defence and fearing to concentrate his force in the open beneath a dominant Luftwaffe, preferred to deploy his dragoons and supporting arms further back in a line of strong points, with his tanks behind them to counterattack enemy penetrations. Billotte accepted his decision and, impressed by the need for haste, added that the First Army Group would advance by day as well as by night, despite the threat of the Luftwaffe, in order to reach Gembloux. Thus Prioux need stall the Panzers only until the dawn of 14 May.

At 11:00 A.M. on 11 May, Billotte diverted most of the French 23rd Fighter Group (Fighter Groupement 23) to cover the advance of the First Army and its neighbouring units. After more fighters had been removed for bomber escort missions, few fighters were left to cover the cavalry. The Allied bombers concentrated on retarding the dangerous advance of Hoepner's Panzers. Prioux's ground reconnaissances fell back before the Panzers, toward the main body of French cavalry, which was established in strongpoints along a 40 km front with the 2d DLM from Huy on the Meuse and north, then westward along the Mehaigne creek. The 3d DLM formed a front from the area of Crehen to Orp and then northward along the Petite Gette stream to the area of Tirlemont. The battleground which Prioux chose consisted of a plateau with occasional woods, a dense road network, extended localities and a few isolated large farms. The Mehaigne and Petite Gette were small streams flowing within two-to-three-meter-deep rock cuts with many crossing points, often fordable by tracked vehicles, and offering good cover for would-be infiltrators. But the key terrain feature was the ridge running from Hannut through Crehen and Merdorp. North of the ridge, the Petite Gette flowed north into the Escaut, south of it, the Mehaigne flowed south into the Meuse. This ridge formed a natural corridor for mechanized forces.

By placing the 3e DLM on a 17 km front, only 11 km were partially covered by anti-tank obstacles. Prioux was straining the limits of French doctrine. The French cavalry manual of 1939 (General Langlois was one its authors and was now commanding the 3e DLM) had considered the case of a DLM assigned to mask a breach in the front until reinforcements could arrive. In such a case, the manual ruled, command would be decentralised. The division should place a combined-arms force on each flank of possible penetration. Then the commander would move his artillery and his reserves to maintain a continuous line of fire. But, if the enemy attacked in force along the whole front, this defence transforms itself into a manoeuvre of retreat. The manual added that a DLM could retreat on a front of no more than 10 to 15 km in average terrain. In the event of the front's extension, the absence of anti-tank obstacles, and a formidable enemy, a withdrawal should be made. French doctrine warned that on a wide front on open terrain against massed armour, the DLM was to abandon the decentralised defence and to concentrate its forces for action. Prioux did not follow these directions.

=== French deployment ===
The French command articulated its cavalry front on May 11. On the left, the 3e DLM under General Langlois, its front divided into northern and southern sectors. The northern sector, commanded by Colonel Dodart des Loges, had, from north to south, the 12th Cuirassiers (division reconnaissance regiment), in touch with British and Belgian cavalry in the Tirlemont area, then a line of two battalions of the 11th Dragoon Regiment; the 3rd Battalion holding six kilometers along the Petite Gette around Opheylissem, with 21 Hotchkiss tanks plus another such squadron from the 1st Cuirassiers battalion and supported by 21 75 mm guns from the Cavalry Corps reserve; and the 2nd Battalion holding five kilometers along the Petite Gette southward to Orp, similarly with its own Hotchkisses plus another squadron from the 1st Cuirassiers and supported by 12 75mm artillery from the 76th artillery. Behind this sector stood one squadron of SOMUA tanks of the 1st Cuirassiers at Marilles. General de Lafont commanded the five kilometer southern sector of the division astride the dangerously open terrain facing Hannut. Lafont had the 1st Battalion of the 11th Dragoons in strongpoints at Thisnes, Wansin, and Crehen, with their Hotchkiss squadrons plus an additional Hotchkiss squadron each in Crehen and Thisnes from the 2nd Cuirassiers, supported by 21 75 mm artillery guns and 12 105 mm guns from the 76th Artillery. One SOMUA squadron of the 1st Cuirassiers at Jauche and two such squadrons from the 2d Cuirassiers at Jandrenouille and Merdorp formed the sector reserve. South of Crehen the 2nd DLM was positioned, covered along almost the whole of its front by the Mehaigne creek, down to Huy on the Meuse river.

== Battle on 12 May ==
=== Morning actions ===
On 12 May 4. Panzerdivision raced to seize their first objective, Hannut, reaching the area that morning. General Hoepner ordered the 3rd and 4th Panzer Divisions (3rd Pz. Div. and 4th Pz. Div.) to concentrate on and secure Hannut to secure the 6th Army's flank. Noting his lack of fuel, and that his divisions' artillery and infantry support had not yet caught up with the armour, which made an immediate assault on Hannut risky, Major-General Stever of the 4th Pz. Div. requested an air-drop of fuel. Concluding that he was only facing one French battalion, he engaged the French defences. That morning the 4th Pz. Div. made contact with a French Armoured force of some 25 tanks. The 4th Pz. Div. destroyed seven of the French tanks for no losses.

Allied air units also concentrated on his unit, which could have made Stever's mission more difficult. The RAF sent over 38 bombers, losing 22. The Armée de l'air made two large bombing attacks, one including 18 of its Breguet 693 bombers on their maiden mission, losing eight. The 85 Messerschmitt Bf 109s of Jagdgeschwader 27 (Fighter Wing 27) flew 340 sorties that day, claiming 26 Allied aircraft for the loss of four fighters. German anti-aircraft artillery (AAA) claimed another 25. But that afternoon General Georges suddenly ordered air priority away from the Belgian plain to the threatened center of his front further south in the Sedan area. Prioux's cavalry formations now had little air cover.

Having surrendered the initiative and with only limited air reconnaissance, Prioux could only wait to see where the Panzers would concentrate. His right flank he anchored on the Meuse. He held Huy with two battalions of motorised heavy infantry plus some dragoons and artillery. His left was in touch with British light cavalry and parts of the Belgian Cavalry Corps delaying the enemy along the axis St. Trond-Tirlemont. German armoured cars followed by infantry infiltrations probed toward Tirlemont that afternoon, leading the French Cavalry Corps to order a squadron of tanks plus one of the divisional reconnaissance groups at its disposal to the area. British reinforcements also reached the scene. The German effort was essentially a reconnaissance and diversionary probe. The main preoccupation of both sides was the open area around Hannut.

On the ground, Stever's 35th Panzer Regiment advancing toward Hannut ran into fierce resistance. The French armour was deployed under cover and during the battle counter-attacked several times. The French forces then yielded Hannut without a fight. German forces attempted to outflank the town, unaware of the retreat. Some 50 light Panzers ran into the French strongpoint at Crehen. French defences equipped with 21 Hotchkiss tanks of the 2d Cuirassiers, supported by parts of the 76th Artillery Regiment plus fire from the nearby 2d DLM. The dragoons lost heavily, but it was the Hotchkisses which carried the burden of the defence, despite the loss of their commander. Firing from prepared positions, German medium tanks attempted to pin down the French while the light tanks moved around the French position. The main French force retreated to Merdorp. The encircled 2d Cuirassiers were freed by an armoured counterattack from the 2DLM. SOMUA S35s breached the German line and the French units broke out, suffering heavy losses in the process. The right flank of the 4th Pz. Div. was now dangerously exposed.

=== Evening action ===
Rushing from the German staging area at Oreye, some 11 km to the northeast of Hannut, the 3rd Pz. Div. moved up to cover this threat. At 16:30 P.M, German 6th Army requested air reconnaissance. The Luftwaffe reported French armour at Orp and motorised units at Gembloux. Reichenau, commander of the German 6th Army, ordered Hoepner to send XVI Corps forward to Gembloux to prevent the French from organising a defence, but Hoepner continued to worry about his stretched supply lines and especially his exposed flanks. His neighbouring IV Corps had elements in the St. Trond area probing toward Tirlemont, worrying Prioux, but the XXVII Corps was still held up north of Liège 38 km east of Hannut, leaving Hoepner's southern flank exposed.

The German solution was to build an advance guard of one Panzer battalion and one rifle battalion supported by two artillery groups to push forward to Perwez, 18 km south west of Hannut, if possible. But Stever ordered his guard that if they met serious resistance the attack was to be halted. The force advanced under heavy air and artillery cover against the French strongpoint at Thisnes, and simply ignored the French counterattack at Crehen in its rear. The streets of Thisnes were barricaded. Heavy French artillery and other fire met the attack, stopping the tank company on point. The remainder of the German force flanked the French position to their right, though poor visibility hampered the movement. The guard finally reached the western edge of the town, only to meet strong artillery fire from the neighbouring French strongpoint in Wansin which continued to increase. The force was ordered to regroup its tanks and riflemen and to secure a perimeter. But before this could be done, French SOMUAs counterattacked knocking out the Panzer Regiment commander's tank. After hard fighting both French and German tanks pulled back in the darkness, stumbling into each other on occasion. The French retreated to Merdorp and the Panzers to the Hannut area.

At 20:00 Stever spoke to Hoepner, telling him he was certain two French mechanised divisions were before him, one to his front and one behind the Mehaigne river. Both agreed to mount a major offensive the next day. According to the plan the 4th Pz. Div. would concentrate to Gembloux's right and operate jointly with the 3rd Panzer, which would receive air support from Fliegerkorps VIII.

The Germans attacked that night, testing the French defences. The French strongpoint at Wansin fought all night against German riflemen, finally withdrawing in the early hours of 13 May. The front of the 3rd DLM remained, holding positions near Tienen, Jandrenouille and Merdorp. The 2nd DLM also held its original front. The only breach of the line occurred at Winson, where the 2nd DLM met the 3rd DLM. Hoepner had failed to take his objective. "On the very first day, French armour — contrary to German reports — definitely emerged victorious".

== Battle on 13 May ==
=== Morning actions ===
To the south-east of the plain, German forces began their assault over the Meuse River: the Wehrmacht's principal effort. To the north, General Hoepner launched spoiling attacks and tied down the powerful French First Army, so that it could not intervene. Hoepner believed the newly arrived 3rd Pz. Div. had only weak enemy forces before it; the 4th Pz. Div. on the other hand, he believed, faced strong French mechanised forces at Hannut and Thisnes—which the French had in fact already abandoned—and possibly a second French mechanised division south of the Mehaigne. The Luftwaffe struck in the late morning to soften the enemy defences. The 3rd Pz. Div. advanced on Thorembais. The 4th Panzer was to move in parallel on Perwez, against an expected strong Belgian anti-tank line. XVI Army Corps thus fell back on the 6th Army's instruction to push immediately on Gembloux.

The French 12th Cuirassiers and to the south the 3rd Battalion of the 11th Dragoons, fought off waves of German infantry supported by armoured vehicles. The German 18th Infantry Division still penetrated their positions. The French command planned to counter-attack with tanks from the 1st Cuirassiers unit to restore their lines, but dropped those plans due to developments on the rest of the 3rd DLM's front. In the afternoon the French command ordered a retreat. The Allied force escaped as the German infantry was too slow in following up their success. The 2nd DLM was positioned just south of the planned axis of Hoepner's attack. In the early morning the 2nd DLM sent some 30 SOMUA S-35s from the Mehaigne to the line Merdorp-Crehen to relieve the pressure on the 3rd DLM. The attack was repulsed by heavy enemy tank and anti-tank fire near Crehen with crippling losses. General Bougrain, commanding the 2nd DLM, signalled enemy infiltrations and attacks by armoured cars over the Mehaigne river at Moha and Wanze, just north of Huy, attacks which threatened to cut off the large Belgian garrison in Huy. Bougrain diverted his tank reserves to try to retrieve the situation. At 15:00 a French reconnaissance aircraft reported large concentrations of German armour south-east of Crehen. The 2nd DLM no longer had reserves available to intervene.

Bougrain's Dragoons and motorised infantry were strung out in a series of isolated strongpoints and thus were vulnerable to infiltration. Bougrain refused the offer of the Belgian III Corps, retreating through his front from the Liège area, to reinforce his troops on the Mehaigne river. Prioux's lack of attention to French defensive doctrine and concentration had allowed decentralised command to continue which damaged the French operational performance which created problems for the French defence.

The German command for its part, worried by the potential of the 2d DLM to interfere with its main attack, juggled force marching infantry units between its XVI and XXVII Corps and scraped together four units from the 35th, 61st, and 269th Infantry Division advancing via Liège, along with air support and some armoured cars. These forces infiltrated between the French strongpoints north of Huy and drew out Bougrain's armour. This critical German success-tying down French armour with infantry freed Hoepner to concentrate against Prioux's front west of Hannut. Had Bougrain concentrated his armour for an advance to the north or northeast, he might have caused untold problems for the German plan. But Prioux gave him no such mission.

The real focus of the battle on 13 May lay west of Hannut. An order arrived from the 6th Army to Hoepner, not only to break through to Gembloux, but to pursue the enemy west of that position. Hoepner concentrated all of his Corps's Panzer and rifle battalions, including about 560 operational tanks, aided on their right by the 18th Infantry Division of the IV Corps, on a front of some 12 kilometers. The 3rd Panzer on the north facing Marilles and Orp, the 4th Panzer facing Thisnes and Merdorp. The 3rd Panzer Brigade of the 3rd Panzer Division moved out at about 11:30. with its 5th Panzer Regiment on the right and its 6th on the left, the Brigade Commander moved forward with the 5th Regiment. By noon the tanks were in action in the barricaded and mined towns along the Petite Gette river. After 90 minutes of heavy fighting, both Panzer regiments succeeded in pushing elements of the French defenders over the stream, the 5th before Marilles, the 6th at Orp. The German command ordered most of the 6th Regiment to turn south toward Jandrain and Jandrenouille, where the terrain was more favourable and they could aid the 4th Panzer Division. Operating on the east and west bank of the Petite Gette, the 6th Regiment ran into French armour in the Orp area, and was then attacked by further French armour. The German battalions combined to defeat the attack.

=== Tank battle at Orp ===
The German forces attacked in the afternoon. The 3rd Pz. Div. on the north facing Marilles and Orp, the 4th Pz. Div. facing Thisnes and Merdorp. The 5th and 6th Panzer Brigade of the 3rd Panzer Division faced an attack by French armour, and both sides clashed while on the offensive. The Panzers were numerically superior and could be seen moving in large formations while the French operated in small groups and fired more slowly. From 15:00 to 15:48 the 3rd Panzer Brigade issued repeated, urgent calls for anti-tank units and the Luftwaffe to deal with French tanks. The 2nd Battalion, 5th Panzer Regiment, still opposite Marilles, suddenly found itself attacked in the flank and rear by superior French armoured forces. The 3rd Panzer Brigade war diary recorded the 15 minutes during which the 2nd Battalion stood alone. The 1st Battalion, 5th Panzer Regiment, seeing victory on the left, sent the 1st Battalion back to his right, bringing the fight before Marilles to a successful conclusion at about 16:00. As the riflemen secured Orp, the Panzers put out an urgent call for 37 and 75 mm ammunition.

That morning the strongpoints of the 2d Battalion, 11th Dragoons suffered serious losses to air and artillery bombardment, while German motorcyclists followed by armoured cars searched for infiltration and crossing points. From about 11:30, the 3d DLM signalled some 80 Panzers opposite Marilles, some 100 before Orp. The dragoons defended their strongpoints supported by their organic Hotchkiss squadron, but their resistance began to crumple at about 13:30 as German numbers and lack of munitions told.

Colonel Dodart des Loges, commanding the northern sector of the 3rd DLM front, ordered a retreat, As the remaining dragoons withdrew, their Hotchkiss H35 tanks together with two Hotchkiss squadrons from the 1st Cuirassiers counter-attacked. The French pushed the German armour back to the stream. Losses were about even, the French claiming six Panzers for the loss of four. Colonel de Vernejoul commanding the 1st Cuirassiers dispatched 36 SOMUA S-35s to halt German armour advancing from Orp to Jandrain. German armoured forces then surprised the French as they attacked. An equal number of Panzers attacked from cover defeating the French attack.

This offensive was the principal effort of the 3rd DLM to check the 3rd Pz. Div. The 2nd DLM launched raids against the still vulnerable flanks of the 4th Pz. Div., and some small groups of French tanks broke through but were quickly dealt with by the German 654th Anti-tank battalion, attached to the 4 Pz. Div. Apart from these isolated and sporadic raids the 2nd DLM did not make any further attempts to attack the 4th Pz. Div.'s flank.

=== Afternoon actions ===
In the afternoon the 4th Pz. Div. began an assault on Medorp. As the French artillery opened fire and German artillery responded, the French pushed armour into the abandoned town and skillfully changed position making the Panzers struggle to strike their targets. The German tanks decided to bypass the town around its left flank, but this exposed the German infantry who were forced to give ground against encroaching French armour. The Panzers quickly did a u-turn and engaged the French in the open. Initially the French held the advantage due to their superior armour and firepower, but German tactics of schwerpunkt, concentrating their armour on the vital point, began to tell. Small groups of French infantry infiltrated and attacked from the rear but German infantry crushed any resistance.

At this point the 3rd Pz. Div. and 4th Pz. Div. were advancing to Jandrain. Outside the town a bitter tank battle took place. The Panzers prevailed through numbers and reported 22 French SOMUA S-35s totally destroyed. The German forces secured the area and town. German forces reported taking 400 prisoners, and capturing four and five tanks. The French forces, the 2nd and 3rd DLM, began a general retreat westward. The Panzer Divisions, no longer fearing an attack on their flanks, advanced and engaged the remnants of the enemy in the evening. The 3rd Panzer Brigade reported a tally for the day of 54 French tanks knocked out, 36 by the 5th Panzer Regiment and 18 by the 3rd Panzer Regiment. Its own losses were listed as "slight". The 6th Panzer regiment reported a provisional loss total of only two tanks. The Germans suffered many more tanks disabled, but as the battlefield was secured a great many were repaired. The remainder of the 3rd DLM was in line behind the Belgian antitank obstacle on the front Beauvechain-La Bruyere-Pietrebais-Incourt-Perwez. The next morning the 2nd DLM fell back into line south of Perwez.

== Battle on 14 May ==
=== Attack on Perwez ===
The German attack on Perwez came in the morning of 14 May. General Stumpff's 3rd Pz. Div. was to engage the new Allied line near Gembloux, whilst General Stever and the 4th Pz. Div. were to break through its centre at Perwez. Hoepner ordered the attack to commence without infantry support, but could not break through the French positions.

The 4th Pz. Div. engaged French armour, which resisted heavily in wooded areas around Perwez. After hard fighting the French defences were destroyed with the help of German infantry. The French First Army had redistributed and spread its tank battalions behind the infantry. Spread out and unsupported, they were defeated by the concentration of numerically superior German combined arms teams.

The 3rd Pz. Div. was halted due to fierce resistance from 2nd DLM. Bitter fighting resulted and the appearance of large numbers of French tanks panicked the German Command into thinking a major counter-attack was developing, when in fact they were just rearguard actions. Both sides suffered significant losses in armour, but as night fell the 2nd DLM halted rearguard actions and the German Command regained its composure. The Allied forces had gained themselves time to reorganise their forces to respond to another major German assault on 15 May.

== Aftermath ==
The German PzKpfw III and IV were the only German tanks that could outmatch the SOMUA S35 in battle. The SOMUA S35 was generally considered to be one of the most formidable tanks during the campaign in the west. German tactics proved superior; by using radio to coordinate manoeuvres, the Germans outwitted the French who were limited to rigid, static positioning as in the First World War. The French tanks could not communicate with such fluidity or rapidity. The French missed tactical and operational opportunities and were poorly coordinated. The German tanks also had more crew members, so the commander could concentrate on command tasks but French commanders had to act as gunner and assistant gunner.

The German plan failed to forestall the French First Army at Gembloux, despite their victory over the 3rd DLM. The German advance to the Belgian plain tied down the Cavalry Corps and part of the French First Army while the main German assault crossed the Meuse at Sedan to the south-east. The Germans had hoped that Hoepner's panzers and their neighbouring corps would tie down and neutralise the threat of the First Army but on 15 May, forces of the First Army properly settled into position, checked the Panzerwaffe, gaining time and space to manoeuvre. Part of the First Army sacrificed itself at the Siege of Lille and held up the bulk of the panzers, which had broken through to the south-east, enabling the British Expeditionary Force and other French units to escape from Dunkirk.

== See also ==
- Battle of Gembloux (1940)
- Battle of Fort Eben-Emael
- Battle of France
- Battle of the Netherlands
- Western Front (World War II)
- List of French military equipment of World War II
- List of German military equipment of World War II

== Notes ==
=== Bibliography ===
- Battistelli, Pier Paolo; Anderson, Duncan (2007). Panzer Divisions: The Blitzkrieg Years 1939–40. London: Osprey. ISBN 978-1-84603-146-5.
- Danjou, Pascal (2007). HOTCHKISS H35/H39. Ballainvilliers: Editions du Barbotin.
- Frieser, Karl-Heinz (2005). The Blitzkrieg Legend: The 1940 Campaign in the West. Annapolis: Naval Institute Press. ISBN 978-1-59114-294-2.
- Gunsburg, Jeffrey A. (April 1992). "The Battle of the Belgian Plain, 12–14 May 1940: The First Great Tank Battle". The Journal of Military History. 56 (2): 207–244. doi:10.2307/1985797. JSTOR 1985797.
- Jentz, Thomas L. (1998). Die deutsche Panzertruppe 1933–1942 [The German Armoured Forces 1933–1942]. Band 1. Wölfersheim-Berstadt: Podzun-Pallas Verla. ISBN 3-7909-0623-9.
- Ramspacher, E. (1979). Chars et Blindés Français [French Tanks and Armoured Vehicles]. Paris: Charles-Lavauzelle.
- Saint-Martin, Gérard (1998). L'Arme Blindée Française: Mai–juin 1940! Les blindés français dans la tourmente [The French Tank Arm May–June 1940! The French Tanks in Turmoil]. Tome 1. Paris: Ed Economica. ISBN 2-7178-3617-9.
