= René Prioux =

French Army general (1879-1953)

René Prioux
- Born: 11 April 1879; Bordeaux, France
- Died: 16 June 1953 (aged 74); Algiers, French Algeria
- Military career
- Allegiance: French Third Republic
- Branch: French Army
- Service years: 1897–1942
- Rank: Army General (France)
- Commands: Cavalry Corps; First Army
- Conflicts: World War I World War II: Battle of Belgium
- Awards: French Croix de Guerre; French Legion of Honor

External image
- René Prioux
- General Prioux

René Jacques Adolphe Prioux (11 April 1879 – 16 June 1953) was a French general who served in both world wars. A cavalry officer of great talent, Prioux rapidly rose through the officer ranks and commanded the Cavalry Corps of the First Army during the Battle of Belgium in May 1940. He was captured by the Germans and spent two years as a prisoner of war. Repatriated in 1942, Prioux came to be seen as a strong supporter of the Vichy regime and was consequently removed from a position of authority in the French Army by Charles de Gaulle, the leader of the Free French, after the landings in French north Africa by U.S. and British forces in November 1942.

== Biography ==
After working as a volunteer for four years for the mayor of Bernay, Eure, Prioux joined the 6th Dragoon Regiment on 9 August 1897. Subsequently attending Saint-Cyr military academy, he was commissioned as a second lieutenant in the 6th Chasseurs Regiment on 1 October 1899. Promoted to lieutenant two years later, he was successively assigned to the 21st Chasseurs Regiment (24 January 1907), the staff of the 19th Army Corps (22 October 1908) and the staff of the 1st Brigade of Algerian Cavalry on 22 October 1910. He was promoted to captain on 27 March 1911 and was assigned to the 3rd Regiment of Chasseurs of Africa on Christmas Day in 1911, before being placed on special duties in March 1914.

=== First World War ===
The outbreak of the First World War found him assigned to the headquarters of the French Army. He moved rapidly through several positions in the next year, serving on the staff of the 34th Army Corps (7 November 1914) and then the staff of the Army of the Vosges, the 7th Army, and with the Belgian Army. Assigned to the staff of the 36th Army Corps on 22 May 1915, Prioux became a squadron commander on 9 April 1917 and was then assigned to the 5th Dragoon Regiment on 18 February 1918. After serving on the staff of the 164th Infantry Division, Prioux was assigned as the chief of staff of the 52nd Infantry Division on 10 February 1919.

=== Interwar Period ===
Serving with French Army headquarters in Morocco in 1919, he attended the École Supérieure de Guerre (War College) in September 1919 and was subsequently assigned to duties as an instructor at the École Supérieure de Guerre in 1921. By January 1923, he was in charge of the school's cavalry studies and was then promoted to lieutenant-colonel on 25 December 1923. On 21 August 1925 he became the commander of the 8th Spahis Regiment, which he commanded until March 1926. While on orders to report to the 11th Cuirassiers Regiment, he took part in the French military mission to Poland in 1929, of which he became commander in 1931. On 12 August 1932 Prioux was promoted to brigadier-general.

In October 1932, Prioux was assigned as the commander of cavalry in Tunisia. By March 1936, Prioux was promoted to major-general and had been assigned as the chief of cavalry at the Ministry of War. Commanding the 7th Military Region in Besançon in February 1938, he was assigned as the inspector-general of cavalry on 1 February 1939, while still commanding the 7th Region until May 1939.

=== Second World War ===
With the start of the Second World War, Prioux was assigned as the commander of the Cavalry Corps on 2 September 1939. He led this unit into Belgium after the German invasion of France and the Low Countries, meeting and severely retarding the advance of the German XVI (motorized) Corps at the battles of Hannut and Gembloux. Following the accidental death of General Billotte, Prioux took command of the French First Army from General Georges Blanchard, who had been promoted to replace Bilotte as commander of the First Army Group, on 26 May 1940, and, with much of the First Army, was taken prisoner of war three days later. The Germans allowed him to return to Vichy France in April 1942, where he was placed in the reserves in May and promoted to the rank of général d'armée in September 1942. He later served on the staff of General Henri Giraud, and was among those named for ouster by Charles de Gaulle, the leader of the Free French.

While the Vichy regime existed, Prioux promulgated antisemitic guidance to senior leaders of the Vichy French forces and was considered an enthusiastic supporter of the Vichy regime. After the Allies landed in French north Africa and the Vichy regime collapsed, Prioux was not assigned to any position of significance in the French Army and spent the remaining ten years of his life in relative obscurity.

== Decorations ==
- Chevalier de la Légion d'honneur 7 November 1914
- Officier de la Légion d'honneur 28 December 1921
- Commandeur avec étoile de l'Ordre de Polonia Restituta March 1933
- Commandeur de la Légion d'honneur 30 December 1936
- Grand Officier de la Légion d'honneur 4 June 1940
- Croix de Guerre 1939-1945

== Works ==
- René Jacques Adolphe Prioux, Souvenirs de Guerre 1939-1943, Flammarion, 1947

== Source and notes ==
This article was created by translating the French Wikipedia article "René Prioux" as it existed on March 6, 2010.

- Angelo Tasca, David Bidussa, and Denis Peschanski. La France de Vichy. Milano: Fondazione Giangiacomo Feltrinelli, 1996.
- (GUF) État-Major de l'Armée de Terre. Guerre 1939 - 1945. Les Grandes Unités Françaises. Volume 1. Paris: Imprimerie Nationale, 1967.
