= Battle of Gembloux (1940) =

Battle during World War II

- Part of the Battle of Belgium, Western Front of World War II
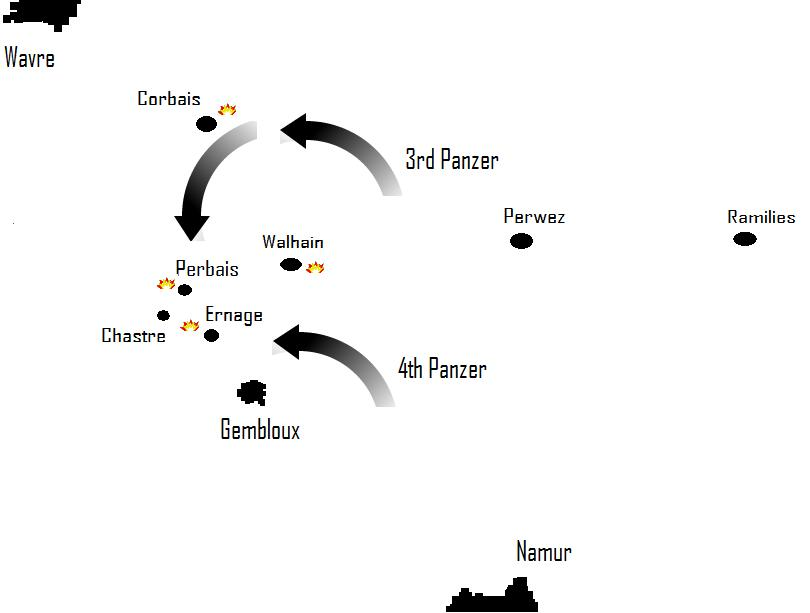
- The Gembloux Gap. The Belgian central plain between Namur and Wavre was occupied by the French Corps de Cavalerie (Général René Prioux), to prevent a German breakthrough into France.
Date	14–15 May 1940
Location	Gembloux, Belgium and vicinity 50.600°N 4.666°E
Result	French victory (Note: "The Allied success at Gembloux was nullified by the German victory further south, but Reichenau's failure to destroy or at least defeat the Allied corps de bataille at Gembloux was crucial. It is true that the Allied high command proved unable in the days following to use the corps de bataille to restore the Allied front. But it took the Wehrmacht another two weeks of fighting to encircle and capture part of First Army, allowing the rest and the bulk of the BEF to escape to Dunkirk" Frieser also regards the battle as a French victory at the tactical level.)

Belligerents
(French Third Republic) France	(Nazi Germany) Germany

Commanders and leaders
(French Third Republic) René Prioux (French Third Republic) Georges Blanchard	(Nazi Germany) Erich Hoepner (Nazi Germany) Viktor von Schwedler

Units involved
(French Third Republic) III Corps (French Third Republic) IV Corps	(Nazi Germany) XVI Corps (Nazi Germany) IV Corps

Strength
c. 400 tanks	c. 600 tanks

Casualties and losses
105 tanks IV Corps: 2,000 killed, wounded & missing III Corps: few hundred casualties	33–37% of tank strength lost 4th Panzer on 15 May: 1,000+ killed, wounded, or missing IV Corps: few hundred casualties.
- Gembloux, a municipality in the Belgian province of Namur

The Battle of Gembloux (or Battle of the Gembloux Gap) was fought between French and German forces in May 1940 during the Second World War. On 10 May 1940, The Wehrmacht, invaded Luxembourg, The Netherlands and Belgium under the operational plan Fall Gelb (Case Yellow). Allied armies responded with the Dyle Plan (Breda variant), intended to halt the Germans in Belgium, believing it to be the main German thrust. The Allies committed their best and most mobile to an advance into Belgium on 10 May and on 12 May, the Germans began the second part of Fall Gelb, the Manstein Plan an advance through the Ardennes, to reach the English Channel and cut off the Allied forces in Belgium.

Unaware that the German invasion of the Low Countries was a decoy, the French Army intended to halt the German advance into central Belgium and France on two defensive positions at the towns of Hannut and Gembloux. The French First Army, the most powerful Allied army, was to defend the Gembloux–Wavre axis. The French Corps de Cavalerie (Général René Prioux), advanced to Hannut, to screen the deployment of the rest of the First Army at Gembloux, by delaying a German advance.

After the Battle of Hannut, some 35 km (22 mi) to the north-east, the French retired towards Gembloux and the principal defensive position for the French on the Belgian front. For two days French defeated attacks by elements of the 6th Army. The German surprise attack through the Ardennes and the crossing of the Meuse at Sedan, forced the First Army to retreat from Gembloux, then back over the French frontier towards Lille. The retreat disorganised the Allied defence on the central sector of the Belgian front and the German armies occupied central Belgium. Strategically the battle was inconclusive, it diverted the First Army from Sedan, which allowed the Germans to achieve the strategic goals of Fall Gelb but the First Army survived and during the Siege of Lille diverted German forces from the Battle of Dunkirk, which allowed the British Expeditionary Force and a substantial French contingent to escape.

== Background ==
=== Gembloux Gap ===
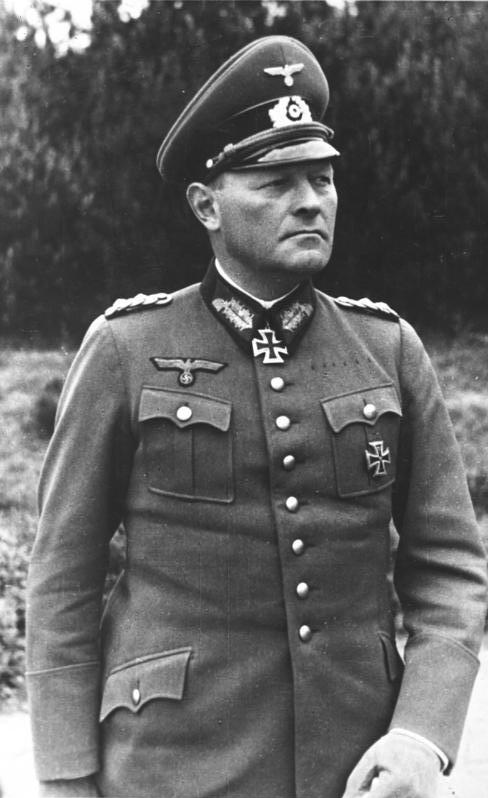
Erich Hoepner, commander of the German armoured formations at Gembloux

Between industrial northern France and Paris and the industrial Rhine-Ruhr River basin of Germany, the plain of central Belgium was a natural route of invasion. A ridge running roughly north-east to south-west through the Gembloux area forms a watershed, to the west streams flow into the Escaut (Scheldt) River and to the east into the Meuse (Maas) the area has few natural obstacles and is called the Gembloux Gap (Trouée de Gembloux).

== Military theory ==
=== German ===
The strategy, operational methods and tactics of the German Army and Luftwaffe have often been labelled "Blitzkrieg" (Lightning War). The concept is controversial and is connected to the problem of the nature and origin of "Blitzkrieg" operations, of which the 1940 campaign is often described as a classic example. An essential element of "Blitzkrieg" was considered to be a strategic, or series of operational developments, executed by mechanised forces to cause the collapse of the defenders' armed forces. "Blitzkrieg" has also been looked on as a revolutionary form of warfare but its novelty and its existence have been disputed. Rapid and decisive victories had been pursued by armies well before the Second World War. In the German wars of unification and First World War campaigns, the German General Staff had attempted Bewegungskrieg (war of manoeuvre), similar to the modern perception of "Blitzkrieg", with varying degrees of success. During the First World War, these methods had achieved tactical success but operational exploitation was slow as armies had to march beyond railheads. The use of tanks, aircraft, motorised infantry and artillery, enabled the Germans to attempt Bewegungskrieg with a faster tempo in 1940, than that of the slow-moving armies of 1914. The internal combustion engine and radio communication solved the problem of operational-level exploitation.

The term "Blitzkrieg" is seen as an anomaly, since there was no explicit reference to such strategy, operations or tactics in German battle plans. There is no evidence in German strategic, military or industrial preparations implying the existence of a thought-out "Blitzkrieg" tendency. Evidence suggests that in 1939 and 1940 the German Reich was preparing the war economy for a war of attrition, not a quick war of manoeuvre, although there was no total economic mobilisation for the war. Hitler's miscalculations in 1939 forced him into war before the war economy was ready and under these circumstances, the German General Staff reverted Vernichtungsgedanke, attempting to win a war quickly, with swift attacks on the flanks and rear of opposing armies, leading to their destruction before the economic and material superiority of the Allies became overwhelming. It was only after the defeat of France in 1940, that the German military intentionally pursued a "Blitzkrieg"-kind of warfare to achieve its ambitions in Europe. In 2005, Karl-Heinz Frieser echoed Matthew Cooper in 1978, who had called "Blitzkrieg" a myth and that it was the weakness of German enemies not the strength of the German army, which had led to the devastating German victories early in the war. Frieser wrote:

The campaign in the west was not a planned campaign of conquest. Instead, it was an operational act of despair to get out of a desperate strategic situation. What is called "Blitzkrieg thinking" did not develop until after [author's emphasis] the campaign in the west. It was not the cause but rather the consequence of victory. Something that in May 1940, had come off successfully to everyone's surprise, was now to serve the implementation of Hitler's visions of conquest in the form of the secret success.

=== French ===
French doctrine emanated from its experiences in the First World War. With only half the population and a third of the industry of Germany, France had suffered proportionally a much higher loss, especially in those killed or permanently disabled. French doctrine therefore rested on the idea of a battle carefully controlled by senior commanders to reduce losses. Doctrine relied on defence in depth, keeping mobile forces away from enemy fire and to secure the line against incursions of enemy armour. The defence of the infantry division on open terrain was based on the artillery which would directly support the infantry and tanks; heavier pieces were reserved for use by the senior commander to make his personal intervention felt on the battlefield. Infantry was to be disposed in depth: from 15 percent to 30 percent of a division's infantry strength in outposts on commanding ground before the main position to cover it from surprises, then the main position of resistance along a natural or artificial terrain obstacle covered by the general barrage of infantry and anti-tank weapons, this position to be some 2 km (1.2 mi) deep down to a stop-line where an anti-tank screen was to be located. Units were to be emplaced on commanding terrain in closed positions capable of defence in all directions, covering the intervals between them with cross fire. Behind the stop-line would be reserves, the divisional reconnaissance battalion and the artillery battery positions in closed strong points. Defence against tanks was a priority throughout the depth of the position. A division on open terrain would hold a front 6–7 km (3.7–4.3 mi) wide and some 5 km (3.1 mi) deep.

The high command reserved battalions of infantry-support tanks for key infantry units. Leading elements of the French army trained to respond to the armoured and air threat, including those under General Henri Aymes commanding the IV Corps which fought at Gembloux. French doctrine provided for air reconnaissance and observation, fighter defence of ground forces and on occasion bomber support in principle, although they might not always be available in practice. The French forces of 1940 were far richer in artillery than in air assets and the reality overshadowed the doctrine.

== Prelude ==
=== Fall Gelb ===
The German strategy (Fall Gelb) required the 6th Army (General Walter von Reichenau) to push its mechanised and motorised formations into the Belgian plain and strike at Gembloux, defeating or tying down Allied forces, while the main German effort was made through the Ardennes to the Meuse River (Battle of Sedan), to cut off the Allied forces in Belgium and northern France. Reichenau expected Allied motorised forces in the Dyle River–Namur area from the second day of operations, with troops brought up by railway from the fourth day. He chose to concentrate his attack between Wavre and Namur where prepared defences seemed the weakest. Luftwaffe (Air Force) medium bombers were to hinder the march of Allied units into Belgium.

=== Dyle plan ===
The French command was sure that the Germans would make their main effort (Schwerpunkt) on the Belgian plain and Grand Quartier Général (GQG), the high command planned to defeat the German move with the First Army, BEF and the Seventh Army, which contained the majority of the Allied mechanised and motorised troops. The Dyle Plan (Breda variant) covered the Allied advance into Belgium to defeat the German offensive. French doctrine opposed an encounter battle with an enemy superior in the air, nor was the command willing to invest more than a limited amount of French manpower in what was likely to prove a bloody battle.

The First Army, commanded by General Blanchard, received the critical mission of holding the Gembloux Gap. Blanchard's army would have to advance some 100 km (62 mi) from the Franco–Belgian frontier. In the process, its front would shrink from some 100 km (62 mi) to 30 km (19 mi) in the Gembloux Gap, where the Belgian army was to prepare defences for it. The powerful Corps de Cavalerie (Général René Prioux), equivalent to a German Panzer corps, was to cover the deployment of the First Army as it narrowed its front and was vulnerable to attacks by the Luftwaffe. GQG allotted Blanchard conventional infantry installed on the frontier plus advance formations of motorised infantry divisions and the 1st DCR (Division Cuirassée, Heavy Armoured Division), including some 70 heavy tanks.

Blanchard received no more than a third of the anti-aircraft weaponry he requested and decided to move his troops only at night. This meant that he would require at least eight days to dig in his infantry divisions, only three of which were motorised, before the Panzers arrived, or

it would be an encounter battle delivered under the worst conditions.

— Blanchard

General Gaston Billotte—commanding the Allied First Army Group to which the French First Army belonged—insisted that First Army have a force of powerful armour to guarantee holding the Gembloux Gap. He wanted to have two DCRs operating under an armoured corps, with the 1st DCR ready for action by the sixth day of operations. He laid down three axes of counter-attack and also warned that German tanks might attack from the sixth day of operations (they attacked one day earlier) but General Alphonse Joseph Georges—Billotte's superior—refused to commit the 2nd DCR in advance. The 1st DCR was ready for action by the morning of 14 May (the fifth day of operations). The Allies also agreed that the British Expeditionary Force would move forward between the First Army and the Belgian army, to a front along the Dyle River; the BEF planned to move both by day and by night.

An important consideration in the Allied plan was the assurance that the Belgian army would prepare defences in the Gembloux Gap in the centre of the Dyle position. The first trace of this Belgian position used the Namur—Brussels railroad line as a tank obstacle, in accordance with French intentions. As the German invasion was repeatedly postponed, the Belgian command revised the trace eastwards in the hope of "dragging" the French closer to the German-Belgian frontier and on 10 May there was only a partial anti-tank obstacle east of the Dyle line. Around Gembloux, defences barely existed; French intelligence was at least partially aware of this but the French were taken by surprise by the lack of field fortifications found on 10 May.

=== German offensive preparations ===
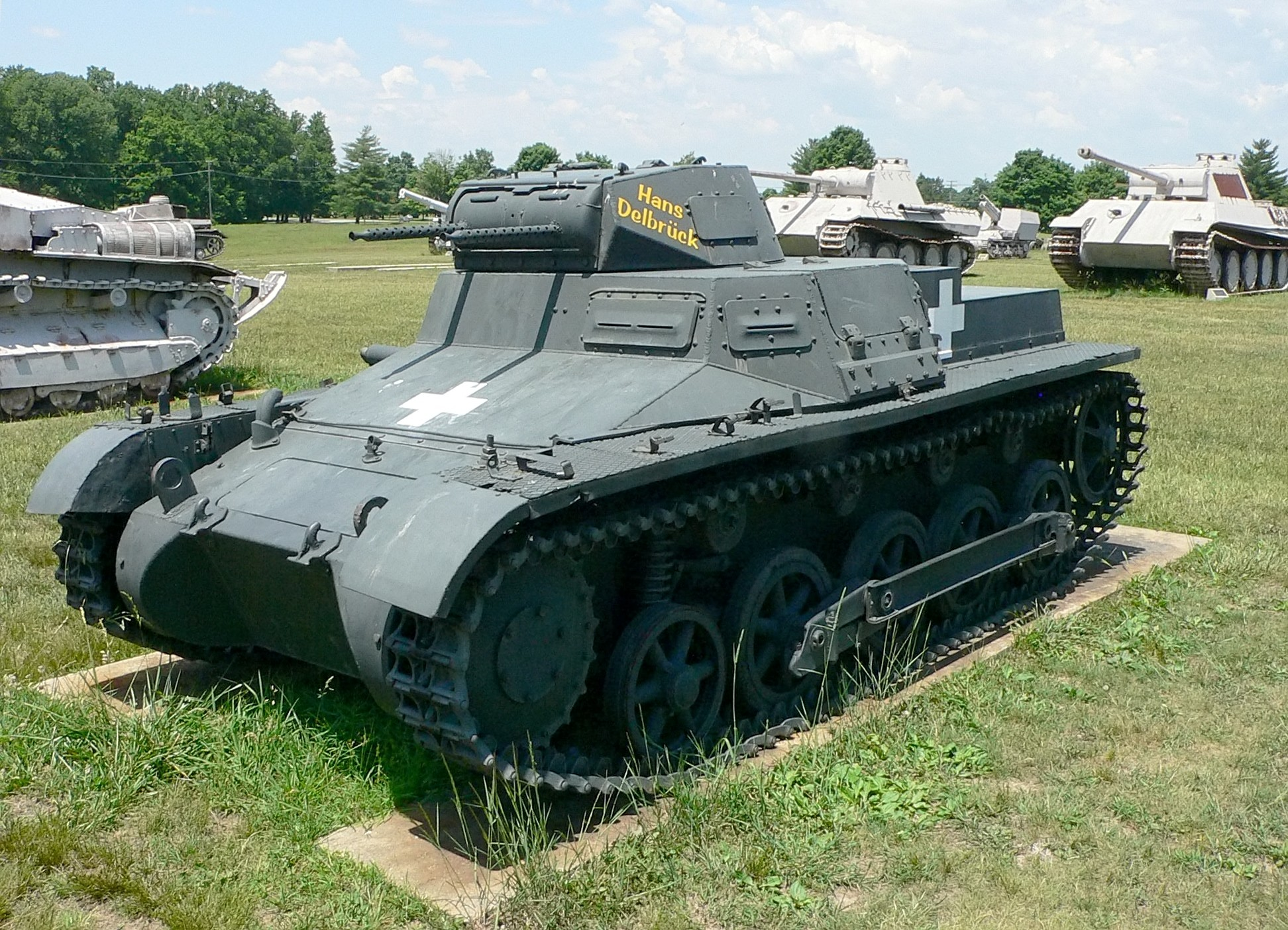
Panzer Is were the most common German battle tank. The type had poor armament and armour protection

On the German side and forming part of Army Group B was Reichenau's 6th Army. Its forces at Gembloux were mostly first-line and experienced reservists. The divisions had been active divisions in peacetime and were filled out with reservists as war approached; they had the best equipment establishments in the Heer (German Army) and most had experienced action in the Invasion of Poland the preceding September. The formations included the XVI Corps commanded by General Erich Hoepner and the IV Corps commanded by General Viktor von Schwedler.

Hoepner's XVI Corps led the attack at Gembloux. Its forces included General Horst Stumpff's 3rd Panzer Division, which on 10 May had the 3rd Panzer Brigade with 343 tanks, the 3rd Motorised Rifle Brigade, an artillery regiment and a squadron of reconnaissance aircraft, plus engineer and service personnel. Of its 343 tanks, only 42 were medium Panzerkampfwagen; 16 Panzer IIIs and 26 heavier Panzer IVs). Generalmajor Johann Stever's 4th Panzer Division had the 5th Panzer Brigade with 331 tanks, the 4th Motorized Rifle Brigade, two artillery regiments and support forces like those of the 3rd Panzer Division. Of its 331 tanks on 10 May, only 20 were Panzer III and 24 were Panzer IV. Hoepner also disposed of the 20th Motorized Division and the 35th Infantry Division during the Battle of Gembloux.

To Hoepner's right, Schwedler's IV Corps had the 31st, 7th and 18th Infantry Divisions, from north to south. The infantry divisions′ artillery and transport units were driven mostly by horse power and they were much slower than the Panzer and Motorised divisions. During the course of the first day, XVII Corps′ 269th Infantry Division arrived, as did the 20th Motorised Division, which was used as flank protection to the south, on the Gembloux-Namur road.

The Wehrmacht counted above all on the Luftwaffe to provide air superiority. Like the French command, the Wehrmacht planned a joint air-land battle, but unlike the Allied air forces, the Luftwaffe had the operational strength, techniques and training to make the idea work. Luftflotte 2 supported Army Group B; its strength on 10 May included some 170 medium bombers and some 550 single-engine fighter aircraft and heavy fighters although these numbers were not active during the first days of operation. The Oberkommando der Luftwaffe (OKL) reinforced Luftflotte 2 in the morning of 15 May with I. Fliegerkorps from Luftflotte 3 (which had some 300 medium bombers on 10 May). Above all, VIII. Fliegerkorps (which had some 300 Junkers Ju 87 Stukas on strength on 10 May and which specialised in ground-support operations) supported Hoepner at Gembloux.

=== French offensive preparations ===
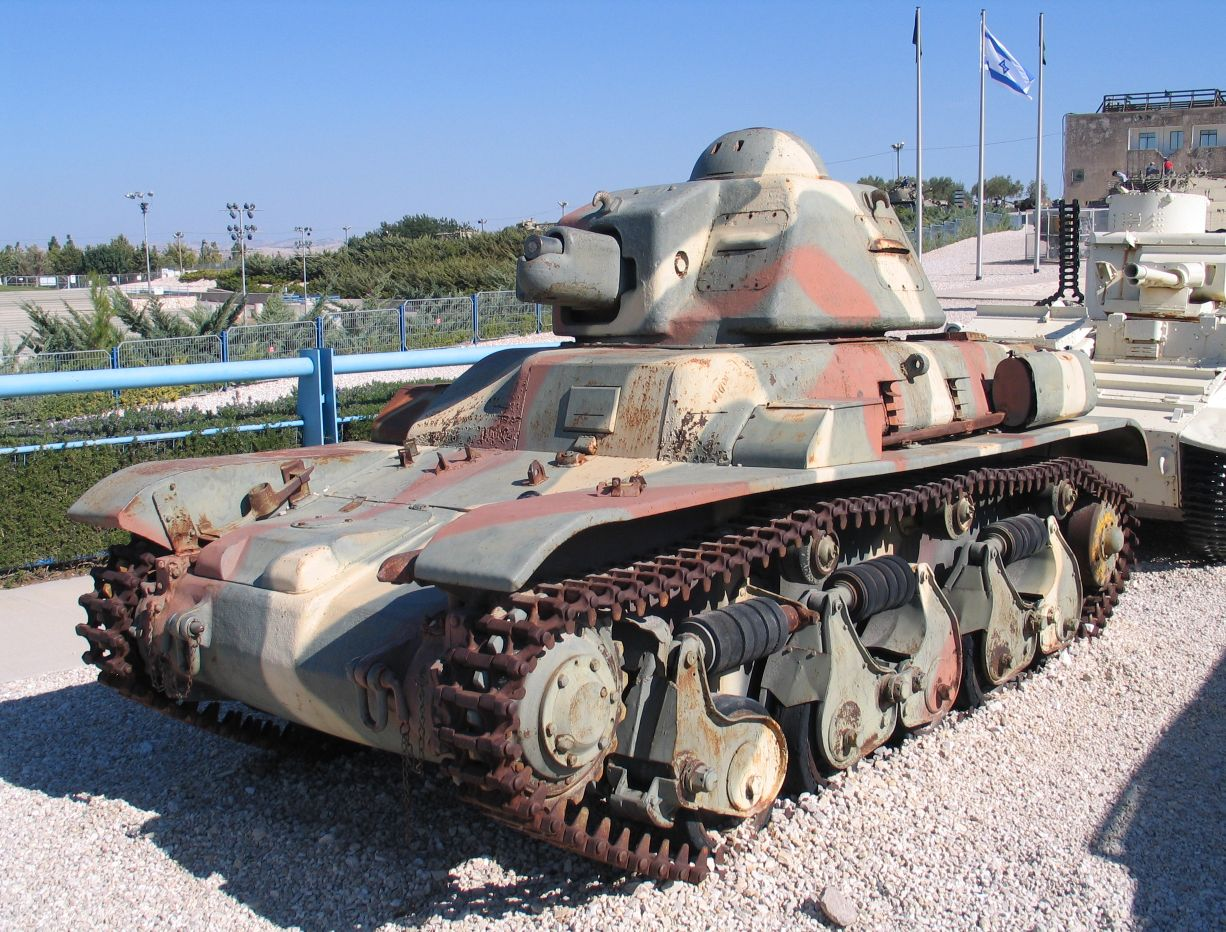
A Renault R35 light tank. Superior to the Panzer I and II, the R35 was outmatched by smaller numbers of the Panzer III and IV.

The Battle of Gembloux was fought on the French side by the First Army under General Georges Blanchard, part of General Gaston Billotte's First Allied Army Group. The major units which fought at Gembloux were comparable to the reservist divisions of the Wehrmacht. The French First Army contingent at Gembloux had General Rene Prioux's Cavalry Corps, composed mainly of the 2nd and 3rd DLM (Divisions Legeres Mecaniques, Mechanised Light Divisions) which had preceded the rest into Belgium and three infantry corps; the III, IV and V, each with one motorised infantry division and one DINA (Division d'Infanterie Nord-Africaine or North African Infantry Division) or DM (Division Marocaine) or (Moroccan Division). Four "fleets" of trucks and buses were allotted to First Army to move all its motorised infantry and support its conventional units. The French North African and Moroccan units were an elite force in the peacetime army, serving overseas, better paid and attracting the most experienced officers from the service schools.

French infantry divisions had three regiments of three battalions each, two regiments of artillery, a cavalry reconnaissance battalion and service troops. Armament included modern mortars, (Note: There were noteworthy differences in the amounts and kinds of indirect fire support available to the Germans and French at tactical echelons. A French infantry regiment was authorised nine 60-mm and eight 81-mm mortars organic to its structure. German infantry regiments counted twenty-seven 50-mm and 18 81-mm mortars, as well as six 75-mm and two 150-mm infantry guns.) fifty-two 25 mm Hotchkiss anti-tank guns and six to eight 47 mm APX anti-tank guns, Canon de 75 M(montagne) modele 1928 and Canon de 155mm GPF field artillery pieces of First World War vintage. In selected divisions, one group of twelve 155 mm guns was replaced by twelve modern Canon de 105 court mle 1935 B guns. Motorised infantry divisions had a cavalry battalion with armoured cars. The infantry-support tank battalion involved in the Battle of Gembloux was equipped with 45 Renault R35 machines: slow, manned by two reservists, lacking radio and armed with a low-velocity AC 37 anti-tank gun of limited effect in the anti-tank role, the Renault nonetheless was powerfully armoured for its time and made a small target. The French infantry divisions which fought at Gembloux also had light automatic anti-aircraft weapons.

Morale in the units of First Army was high, based on the soldiers' confidence in their equipment and their leaders. General de Fornel de La Laurencie's III Corps and especially General Henri Aymes's IV Corps played the critical role in the Battle of Gembloux.

The III Corps had (from north to south) the 2nd DINA and the 1st DIM (Division d'Infanterie Motorisee, or Motorised Infantry Division). Both were complete in personnel and materiel. The 2nd DINA had battlefield experience from the small-scale Saar Offensive the preceding September, while the 1st DIM had yet to receive its "baptism of fire". Roughly half its cadres were reservists.

The IV Corps included (from north to south) the DM and the 15th DIM. More than the rest, General Albert Mellier's DM bore the brunt of the Panzer attack at Gembloux. Heir to the prestige of the DM of the First World War, the division consisted mostly of Moroccan regulars supplemented by European reservists. The 2nd Moroccan Rifle Regiment, for example, had 2,357 men present at Gembloux, several hundred having been caught on leave by the sudden German offensive. Of those present, 925 were Europeans compared to 1,432 Moroccans. French cadres were both active and reservist. A few Moroccans had risen to be junior officers and the Non-commissioned officer cadre was mixed; in the light artillery the officers were all French and mostly active-duty, in the heavy artillery all officers were French and most were reservists. Mellier had been their commander since the end of February. He was known to be extremely active and possessed a "perfect knowledge" of Arabic. However, the Moroccans had the reputation of being better in the attack than in the defence. Despite the fateful mission which awaited it, the DM had only twenty-seven 25 mm anti-tank guns among its infantry instead of the 48 which was its established strength. There were anti-aircraft weapons with the regiments but no divisional battery and the divisional transport lacked vehicles and some 400 horses. Supporting the DM was General Alphonse Juin's 15th Motorised Infantry Division. Enjoying the "absolute confidence" of his men in a unit complete in personnel and armed to the highest standards of the French army of the time, the 15th DIM was ready to contribute significantly to the defence at Gembloux.

The French weakness was in the air. By the time the Battle of Gembloux began, the First Army had only the remains of one group of 26 fighters, one reconnaissance group and the observation squadrons.

=== Battle of Hannut ===
The Corps de Cavalerie had defeated German attempts to close on the Dyle line at Hannut and retired to the second line of defence at Gembloux, about 35 km (22 mi) to the south-west. The French and German tanks had exacted a heavy toll on each other, the French had knocked out 160 German tanks for 105 losses. By retreating from the battlefield, the French lost many of their knocked-out tanks, while the Germans repaired nearly three-quarters of their disabled vehicles; only 49 tanks were destroyed and 111 tanks were repaired. German casualties were 60 men killed and another 80 wounded.

Hoepner pursued the French despite warnings from 5th Panzer Brigade of the 4th Panzer Division, that its losses from Hannut meant any further damage would be tantamount to "suicide". Hoepner did not wait for the infantry divisions to close up and tried to bounce the French out of their defences. The XVI Panzer Corps ran into retreating French columns and inflicted many losses. The closeness of the pursuit created severe problems for the French artillery, which was reluctant to risk inflicting casualties on its own side. The French set up new anti-tank screens and lacking infantry support, Hoepner was forced into a frontal attack. The two panzer divisions reported many losses on 14 May and were forced to slow their pursuit. In the aftermath, the French armoured units were joined by fresh formations which then set up a new defensive position to the east of Gembloux.

== Battle ==
=== 14 May ===
The Panzers moved out on 14 May to overrun the Dyle position. At least until 09:20 (French time), air reconnaissances indicated that the position was unoccupied. At that hour, Hoepner was with 4th Panzer Division urging that unit to break through on both sides of Ernage without waiting for 3rd Panzer. The 35th Infantry and 20th Motorized Divisions were both behind the Panzers, respectively on their right and left flanks. The 4th Panzer Division ordered an advance with Panzer and Rifle Brigades operating together. The left flank of the division would be covered by the reconnaissance battalion, a machine-gun battalion and most of an anti-tank battalion. At 11:30, Eighth Company, 35th Panzer Regiment with some 30 tanks attacked from Baudeset toward the rail line south of Ernage but was stopped with the loss of nine tanks by enemy artillery fire and withdrew. The 6th Company was unable to aid it because of the "annihilating defensive fire".

At 13:30, the 4th Panzer Brigade ran into enemy positions between the rail line and the highway from Wavre to Gembloux. The Dyle position was defended. The action of 3rd Panzer Division on 14 May is much less clear. That morning, 3rd Panzer Brigade crossed the Belgian anti-tank obstacle behind the 4th Panzer Division, with 5th Panzer Regiment on the right and 6th Panzer Regiment on the left. Colonel Kuhn—the brigade commander—was with 6th Panzer Regiment which became involved in the fighting in Ernage and on the Wavre-Gembloux road, the tanks being taken under "lively" artillery and anti-tank fire. Kuhn decided to wait for infantry support to arrive. While the Panzers blundered into the French defence, 6th Army pressed its infantry corps forward to cover their flanks.

=== Early German gains ===
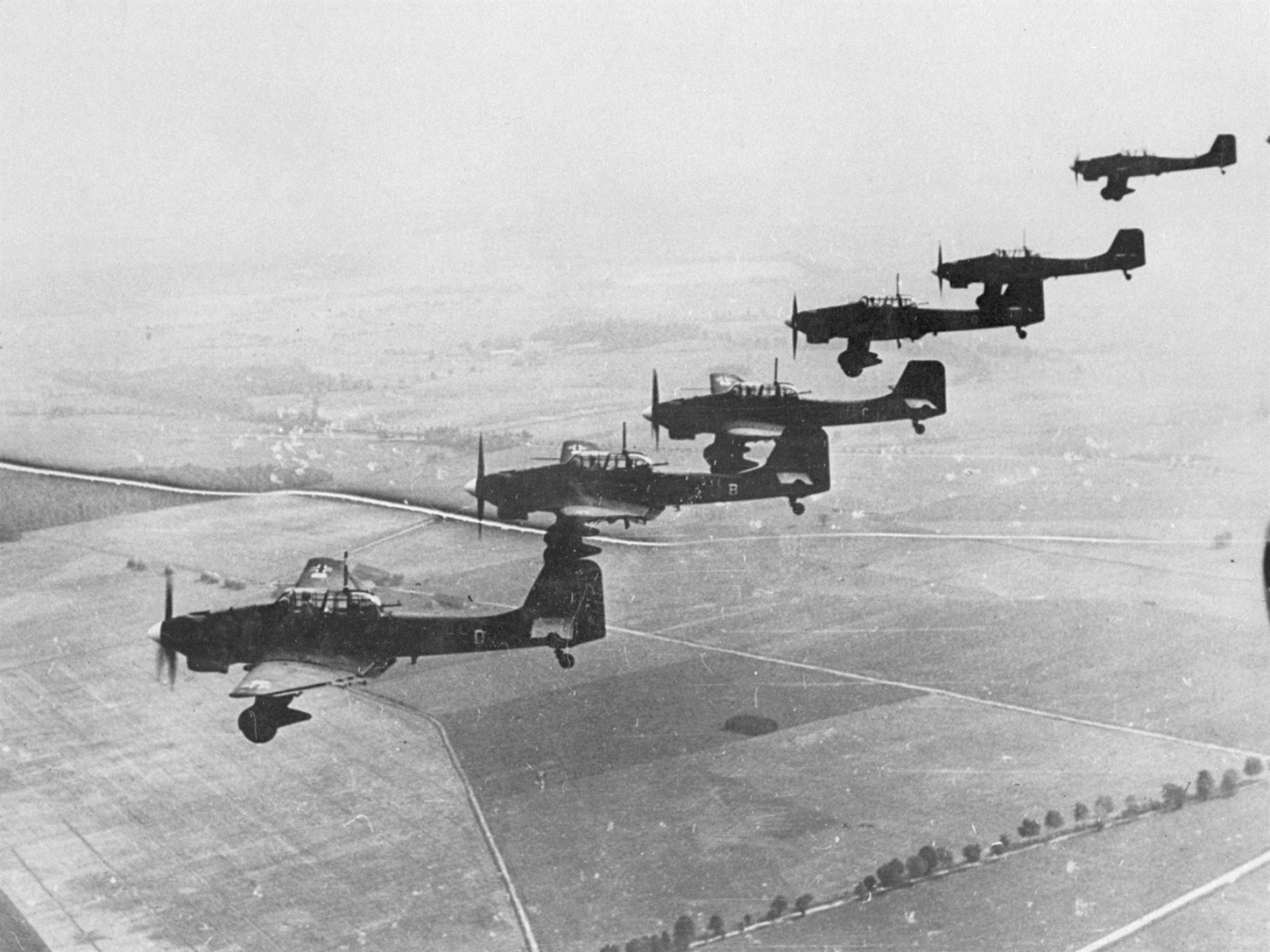
The Germans had air superiority throughout the two-day battle. Formations of Junkers Ju 87Stukas contributed with mixed results during the battle.

Schwedler's IV Corps was to cover the Panzers' right flank as it had done against the French cavalry on 13 May (at Hannut). The infantry made good progress against virtually no resistance early on 14 May and advance guards of the 31st, 7th and 18th Infantry Divisions contacted the Dyle position that afternoon and evening. At 21:50, the Chief of Staff of the 6th Army urged the infantry forward in support of 3rd Panzer Division which was involved in heavy fighting at Walhain and Ernage. By the end of 14 May, the divisions reported the Dyle position to be occupied. The corps found demolitions and mining on the approach routes difficult to negotiate. As German forces moved into contact, the French First Army suffered the attentions of the Luftwaffe. French fighters could barely cover the three or so reconnaissance missions flown into the area beginning that morning (most of the reconnaissance planes were lost). The retreating Cavalry Corps detailed the enemy advance and delayed the Panzers north of Ernage (near the positions of the 3rd DLM) and around Grand Leez (near 2nd DLM). As the cavalry left the field, Blanchard ordered its tanks to remain nearby in reserve. Meanwhile, the German thrust continued to develop to the south.

That evening, Billotte's headquarters warned First Army to prepare for a possible retreat, but the formations in the field knew nothing of this. The 1st DIM was disturbed by the retreat of the cavalry and Belgian infantry and refugees in the afternoon of 14 May. The first Stuka attack made a great impression on the troops, for whom this was their baptism of fire. False rumours of parachutists led to brief friendly fire incidents in which several artillery men were killed. By that evening, de La Laurencie's III Corps and units of the British and the Belgian Army on the Dyle position and at Namur made contact with German patrols.

Hoepner had discovered that the Dyle position was defended. Nonetheless, until at least 16:50, superior headquarters urged him to pursue the "defeated" enemy. To the north, 3rd Panzer Division became locked in fighting on its right flank as noted above. At 14:00, XVI Corps ordered the 35th Infantry Division to move in that direction, while the 20th Motorized Division was to move to the other flank of the corps and the arrival of the 269th Infantry Division from XVII Corps on the north edge of the Namur fortress relieved fears from that direction. At 14:05, General Stever—commanding the 4th Panzer Division—ordered 5th Panzer Brigade supported by a rifle battalion to attack on a narrow front south of Ernage, to reach hills east of St. Gery. The divisional artillery would neutralise flanking fires from Ernage and Gembloux. At 16:00, he delayed the attack so that 3rd Panzer Division could prepare. At 16:50, Stumpff radioed 4th Panzer Division that he would inform them when he was ready, but in the meantime began his own attack in the Ernage area alone. After 18:00, XVI Corps again pressed its divisions to attack, but French defensive barrages were so dense that a poison gas alert was mistakenly declared, stopped these attacks. At 20:50, Hoepner radioed his division commanders to halt their offensive until the next morning.

=== Mixed results ===
That afternoon, 4th Panzer Division had suffered both from the French defence and German command confusion. Stever went forward to meet Oberst (Colonel) Breith, commanding the 5th Panzer Brigade and Boyneburg, commanding 4th Rifle Brigade. Both officers insisted that a prepared attack was no longer possible that day. French artillery shelled the headquarters of the brigades out of Baudeset, leaving two unnamed rifle battalion commanders dead. The shelling was deadly accurate from the first round, a number of German tanks taking direct hits as they waited around Baudeset. Harassing fire continued all night, forcing crews to dig in under their tanks.

The intentions of the 3rd Panzer Division for 14 May are unclear. The division's left-flank regiment—6th Panzer Regiment—did attack in the Ernage area in the afternoon and was checked by defensive fire. The supporting riflemen failed to arrive and 3rd Panzer Brigade reported being under enemy air observation after 19:00 hours. Meanwhile, serious fighting was reported with tanks (of the 3d DLM) in the Walhain and St. Paul areas and French tanks also appeared at Ernage, leading the Panzer Brigade command to conclude that the situation was critical; enemy armour, against which only the 75 mm gun of the Panzer IV was really effective, was trying to break through both on the left and the right with artillery support directed by spotter aircraft while the German infantry had not yet arrived. This was a misreading of French intentions, but it was indicative of the psychological damage suffered by the command of 3rd Panzer Brigade. That night the front quietened down, the infantry arrived and driven on by urgent orders issued hours earlier, advanced in the dark. Despite coming under fire from their own tanks by mistake, one battalion almost reached the French main position. The battalion found itself alone before dawn between Ernage and Perbais with no radio contact with the division.

=== 15 May ===
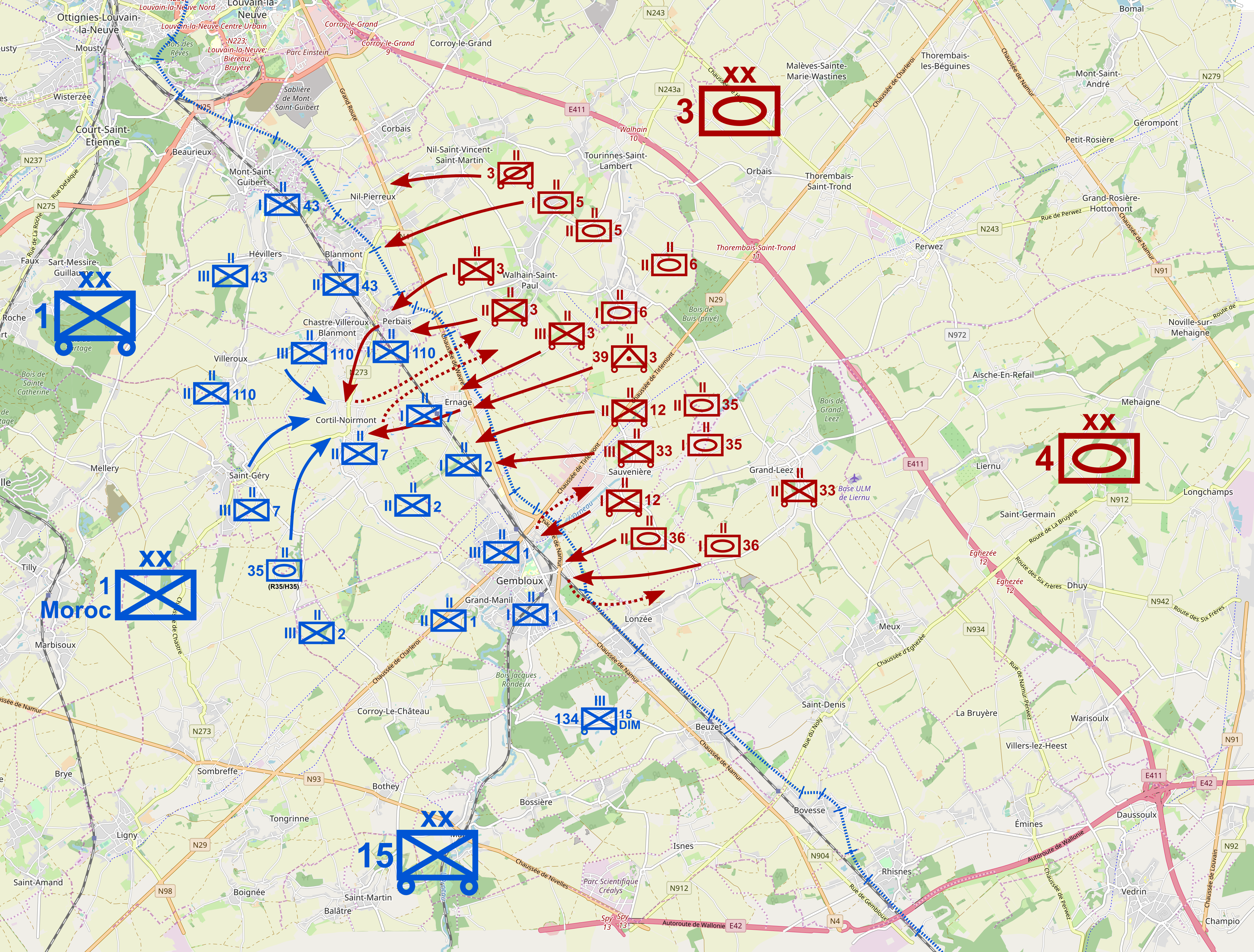
Map of the battle, 15 May 1940

Hoepner had decided to throw his tanks with available artillery and air support at a solid French defence rather than wait another day to bring up his two infantry divisions for a more powerful effort. Encouraged by his superiors and the thrust of German doctrine to attack before the enemy could further prepare himself, he decided at about 20:00 on 14 May not to wait. 6th Army intelligence continued to insist that the Allies were retreating, ordering XVI Corps to pursue and claiming that German tanks were already west of Gembloux (which was false). Nonetheless, at 22:45 the corps ordered an assault by 3rd and 4th Panzer Divisions for 08:00 of 15 May with the railroad line on both sides of Tilly, well beyond the French defences at Gembloux, as the first objective. Fliegerkorps VIII with the artillery available would support an assault on both sides of Ernage on a front of less than 6 km (3.7 mi). Engineer units were to repair the blown bridges and crossroads left behind by the Allies, which threatened to disrupt logistics.

Stever of 4th Panzer Division ordered his 4th Rifle Brigade to deploy three battalions in line from Gembloux to Ernage, echeloned back on their left flank. In addition to air support, one artillery regiment would fire a 30-minute preparation on the French main position, then fire smoke shell to blanket Gembloux, following which, both his artillery regiments and a heavy battalion would concentrate on counterbattery fire and areas impenetrable to armour. Anti-aircraft guns would neutralise enemy bunkers (of which, however, there were none). As the infantry crossed the railroad line they were to fire white starshell. At this signal, 5th Panzer Brigade would break cover and charge the French position together with the riflemen. Pursuit in the direction of Nivelles would follow. Stumpff's plan for 3rd Panzer Division is less clear. He too put his infantry ahead of the tanks with Stuka and artillery support, ordering a few tank units to support the infantry. His first objective was to reach two hills west of the line Chastre-Noirmont. The mass of the German armour would wait in reserve to deal with enemy armour or to exploit the breakthrough.

To the Panzer Divisions' right, the German IV Corps was to engage in bitter fighting in the morning of 15 May and at 09:20 hours warned its divisions that a "decisive battle" was developing on the Dyle. The corps ordered a concentrated effort in the Ottignies area at the boundary between 7th and 18th Infantry Divisions. An exploitation group would follow up the expected breakthrough. Meanwhile, the Luftwaffe reinforced Luftflotte 2, by now depleted in many units to 30-50 percent of strength, with Fliegerkorps I from Luftflotte 3. In effect, the high command gave priority to 6th Army in its effort to defeat the Allied corps de bataille.

=== First Battle of Perbais ===
The day was hot and clear. French artillery had fired heavily all night, but the planned Stuka attacks and German artillery preparation went forward from 07:30. At 08:00, the infantry of 4th Panzer Division advanced undisturbed by enemy shelling. At 08:10, riflemen fired white starshell indicating that they had crossed the railroad line, but at 08:20 French artillery engaged the incursion and as the German tanks drove forward, they were pinned down. At 09:30, 36th Panzer Regiment was suffering heavy losses standing before the obstacle, 35th Panzer Regiment similarly at 09:45. When 5th Panzer Brigade headquarters asked why the infantry was not advancing, they were told "attack hopeless". By 10:00, II Battalion of the 12th Rifle Regiment had a company on the railroad line at Gembloux, but the advance was slow and costly and had halted by 11:00. Radio contact with 5th Panzer Brigade was lost and the tanks were milling around before the obstacle and being picked off one by one.

Meanwhile, infantry of 3rd Panzer Division attacked from Walhain-St.Paul against Perbais at 09:15, but they too stuck fast by 11:00. The war diarist of XVI Corps complained that the tanks of 4th Panzer had joined the fray before the anti-tank obstacle had been cleared. The corps operations officer of French descent, Chales de Beaulieu, criticised the 3rd Panzer Division for allowing its infantry to bog down while leaving its tanks in reserve.

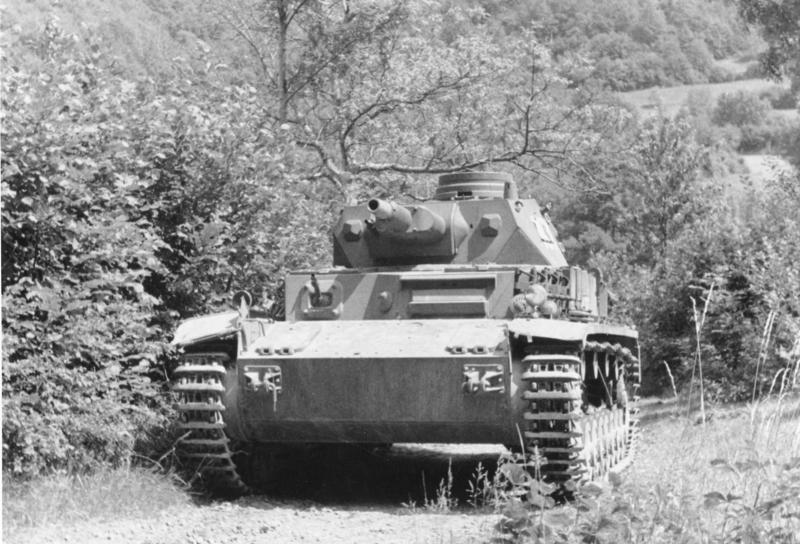
German armour suffered considerably on 15 May.

The Ju 87s and artillery failed to silence the French guns. Most of the reports of French batteries were too imprecise to be of use. One scout aircraft was hindered in its work by enemy fighters. At 10:30, the heavy artillery battalion had itself to flee French counterbattery fire. By 11:18, the weight of French shelling on approach routes and installations drove the corps artillery commander to conclude that holding gains made and bringing in reinforcements were "gravely threatened". One German source reported that the assault stuck fast on the Wavre-Gembloux road with only one battalion at first reaching the railway, followed immediately by a French tank and infantry counterattack against which German anti-tank guns had little effect. Some of the German anti-tank gun crews fled without even opening fire. However, there is no known French record of French tanks on the field at this point in the battle.

Oberst Breith led his 5th Panzer Brigade in his command tank, forward with 35th Panzer Regiment. Seeing his attack bog down, Breith had some of his officers leave their machines to rally the riflemen to attack the anti-tank guns. His crew could see anti-tank mines lying unburied on the ground. Some of the French and Moroccans surrendered. An infantry support gun arrived and added its fire. Breith's command vehicle then took two hits, although it was not penetrated. The tank began to move toward Ernage when "a blue flash traversed our vehicle like a thunderbolt." Breith was lightly wounded and the crew bailed out. A light tank which tried to rescue them was in turn hit and the tankers had to seek shelter in shellholes. Captain Jungenfeld was not far from them and noted that as they reached the railroad line all the heavy vehicles of Fourth Company were destroyed, the tank of Oberstleutnant Eberbach, commander of the regiment, was knocked out. Eberbach told his subordinates "further advance is simply impossible. Our tanks sit and before the obstacles the defence fire strikes us mercilessly."

When the tanks finally began to fall back, the I. Battalion of the 12th Rifle Regiment also withdrew, contrary to orders, forcing staff officers to turn out to stem the retreat. An attempt by 36th Panzer Regiment to exploit a gap in the railroad embankment near Lonzee against the 15th DIM broke down immediately under French fire. The 4th Panzer Division was halted.

Since 3rd Panzer Division withheld its tank brigade, its battle went rather differently. At dawn on 15 May, Third Battalion, the 3rd Rifle Regiment was to the northeast of Ernage, but its I and II Battalions (to the north and northwest of Ernage respectively) had moved too far to their right during the night, opening a gap of 1–2 km (0.6–1.2 mi) between 3rd and 4th Panzer Divisions which should have abutted near Ernage. Thus, 3rd Panzer Division found itself engaged more against the French 110th Infantry Regiment (of the 1st DIM) at Perbais than intended. At dawn, German aviation and artillery deluged Ernage. The I Battalion of the 3rd Rifle Regiment attacked the northern edge of the village, but the attack broke down under infantry fire. At 08:00, after further air and artillery preparation, II Battalion, hampered by its own artillery which was firing on the basis of map coordinates, advanced toward Perbais and failed in turn. The commanders of the two battalions met to concert their efforts, while III battalion west of Baudeset received orders to close the gap between 3rd and 4th Panzer Divisions.

In a second effort, I and II Battalions renewed their advance with the support of 75th Artillery Regiment, the artillery this time providing observed fire to better effect. Profiting from this and a Ju 87 attack, the riflemen took Perbais despite heavy loss to French artillery and advanced to the railroad line. A few tanks came up to support them and the situation began to look more promising.

On the whole, however, it had been one bad morning for XVI Corps. On the French side of the plain, the intense effort of the Luftwaffe made a powerful impression. Against them, the Armée de l'Air had furnished only two fighter sweeps. Reconnaissances sent by First Army and IV Corps fell victim to flak and enemy fighters. Command of the air was firmly in German hands. IV Corps took the brunt of the Panzer assault. From dawn, ground observers reported some 300 enemy tanks approaching French lines, Aymes claiming that enemy attacks began toward 06:00, were checked, then followed from 08:00 by waves of Ju 87s which attacked the whole depth of the position. The enemy crossed the railway in the sector of the 2nd Moroccan Regiment and reports reached corps headquarters that Perbais and Chastre (in the zone of the 1st DIM) had fallen, threatening IV Corps' left flank. Aymes released one infantry support tank battalion to each of his divisions and gave his corps reserve infantry battalion to the DM. To cope with the situation behind Perbais, Aymes wanted the tank brigade of the 3rd DLM to counterattack but its commander, General La Font, informed him that de La Laurencie of III Corps had already taken control of the armour without informing Aymes.

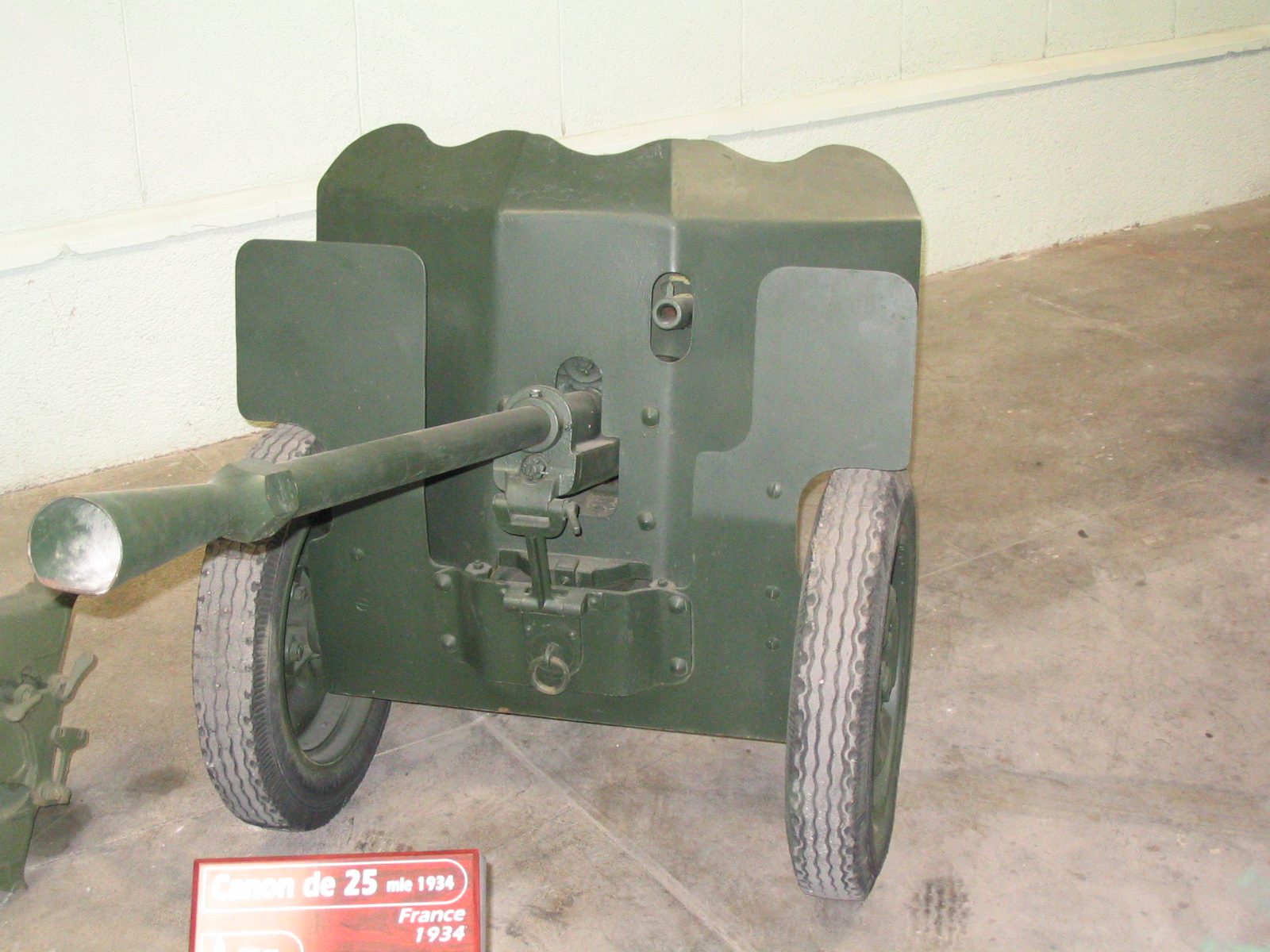
A 25 mm Hotchkiss anti-tank gun. French artillery dominated the battlefield.

The Moroccan Division stood the assault of roughly one and a third Panzer Divisions. The 7th Moroccans Regiment in Ernage, like the neighbouring 110th in Perbais, fought bitterly before giving ground. The mixed post between the two regiments resisted, encircled, until 15:00. The 2nd Moroccan Regiment were on exposed terrain and by 12:00, seven platoons in their front line were all but destroyed, although support elements held on. The 1st Moroccan Regiment in Gembloux was driven back into the town but held out, although the enemy succeeded in infiltrating to the west of the town along the Gembloux-Nivelles railway, parallel to the Chaussee Brunehaut. German bombing caused losses and some panic among the artillery and the infantry battalions at the front felt their fire support slacken.

Roaming his front on a motorcycle, Mellier judged that his centre was sound and his right at Gembloux strong, but he had to deal with the threats at Ernage and along the Gembloux—Nivelles railroad. He decided to reestablish contact with the 1st DIM on the stop-line near Cortil-Noirmont, then to reconquer the main position using the corps reserve (3rd Battalion of the 7th Moroccan Regiment) and La Font's tank brigade. To reestablish his right-center, he would commit the divisional reserve (3rd Battalion of the 2nd Moroccan Regiment) and the 35th Tank Battalion.

French artillery played a critical role in the battle. During the previous night, the batteries of 75s posted forward in the antitank role returned to their battalions, possibly on the assumption that the tank threat was now less pressing than that of the enemy infantry. From early morning, Ju 87s concentrated on the artillery of the DM. Two batteries had their guns overturned, although they later returned to action. There was panic in a reservist battalion from the general reserves; one battalion of 105s from corps artillery which had not yet been integrated into the fire plan suffered casualties and its commander pressed for a fire mission to shore up his men's morale. Pointed at the Bois de Buis, as likely cover for German tanks, the 105 mm guns fired at maximum rate, provoking heavy air attack from the Ju 87 units. Clearly the artillery of the DM lost some of its effectiveness, but that of the 15th DIM whose flanking fires greatly aided the DM, which did not suffer many casualties.

The infantry and support weapons were hard hit. Losses in junior officers whose leadership was critical to colonial troops were particularly heavy. The 1st Battalion, 2nd Moroccans had two companies on the railroad line. Lieutenant Grudler commanding the 2nd company was killed, reservist Captain Bouvier was wounded and captured towards 13:30 after being attacked by a battalion supported by some 30 tanks and 20 aircraft, two company commanders of the 1st Moroccans were killed. The 1st Battalion, of the 7th Moroccan Regiment had two companies forward of the railway at Ernage. That of Lieutenant Jouval in the south of the village was encircled by infiltrators by 06:00, the second to the north was outflanked by tanks of the 3rd Panzer Division and infantry and hit by effective artillery fire. Finally the battalion commander ordered a withdrawal to the railroad line, leaving Jouval to fight on alone. Ju 87 attacks initially made a great impression on the troops but, according to Lieutenant Goubard, executive officer of the 2nd Battalion of the 2nd Moroccan Regiment, the troops quickly learned to move dispersed and to take cover only when actually attacked and French anti-aircraft and automatic weapons took a toll of their attackers.

Ammunition was short among the French forces by this point and the rate of fire was slowed. Their reduced fire encouraged some of the German tanks to slip around their flank behind a hedge, but they were spotted and seven tanks were destroyed. The neighbouring 110th Regiment coped with the northern wing of the Panzer attack. From 05:00, the divisional reconnaissance battalion retreated onto its 1st Battalion, which felt the full weight of the enemy bombardment followed by infiltrations of enemy riflemen into Ernage, exposing the battalion's right flank. The 3rd Battalion to the north was forced back as well. Despite the support of all the divisional anti-tank weapons available and then the divisional reserve battalion, the front of the 110th remained vulnerable.

Meanwhile, the IV Corps fought a parallel battle to the north-west. Attempts to infiltrate across the Dyle failed and the infantry divisions had to organise set-piece attacks which drove French outposts back to Ottignies towards 10:00. The 7th Infantry Division prepared an attack at Limal, while the 31st Infantry had to regroup before engaging the British north of Wavre. The French III Corps thus found itself in heavy fighting in the morning of 15 May, although only its right-hand regiment (the 110th) faced enemy tanks. The artillery of the 2d DINA could not completely check enemy infiltrations. By 12:00 the defenders retreated to Ottignies.

=== Second Battle of Perbais ===
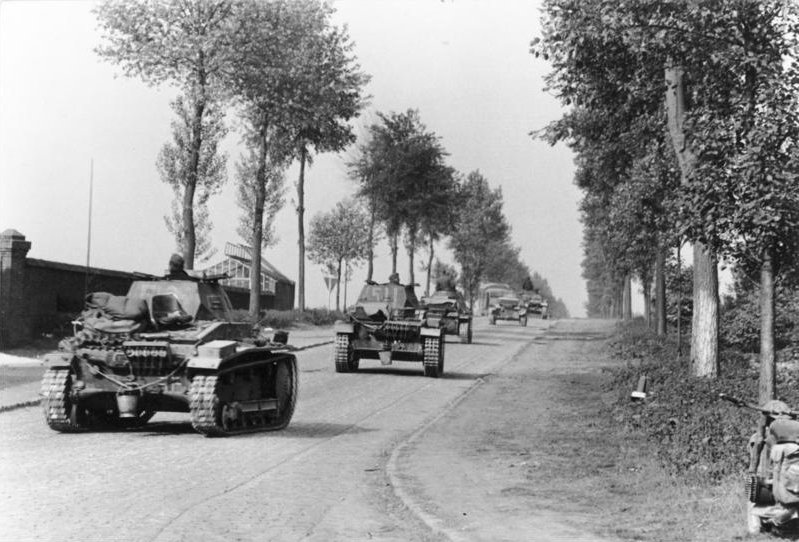
German tanks in Belgium, May 1940. The Gembloux Gap was easy tank country with no natural obstacles. It was vital the French prevented the enemy penetrating the gap.

Hoepner arranged for a new Stuka attack for 12:00 and ordered his divisions to exploit it to break through the enemy position. The French fire did not let up and at 12:30 Oberstleutnant Eberbach commanding the 35th Panzer Regiment refused to renew the attack, having lost half his tanks including his own. Stever came up to the headquarters of 33rd Rifle Regiment to urge on the attack and was hit by a French shell and evacuated. Breith, commanding 5th Panzer Brigade, was out of contact, so command devolved on Oberst Boyneburg commanding 4th Rifle Brigade. At about 14:00, Hoepner passed on the order to stop the offensive but he did not halt the effort of 3rd Panzer Division in the Ernage area. He began planning a new attack with the addition of 35th and 20th Infantry Divisions.

Having begun the day over-optimistically, the German command now swung to the other extreme. 6th Army refused XVI Corps's request to renew the attack the next morning in favour of a set-piece attack by the whole army, which could not begin before 17 May. There were solid reasons for delay; the corps artillery commander noted German difficulties in locating and neutralising French batteries and added that logistics units could not make good the heavy consumption of ammunition because of the state of the road net.

The war diary of the 4th Panzer Division makes clear the extent of the defeat. From 11:07, radio contact with the staff of 5th Panzer Brigade was lost. Breith was out of contact and reports from the front showed that the tanks were taking heavy losses and could not remain standing under fire. Thus, at 12:00 the division ordered the armour back to its start positions. At 13:00, 4th Rifle Brigade reported that the infantry was likewise pulling out. Boyneburg ordered them forward again. At this point, Stever went forward, only to return to his headquarters at 14:00, wounded. At 15:00, 4th Panzer Division reported to XVI Corps that the Panzer Brigade staff was stuck on the railroad line. The 4th Rifle Brigade also had suffered heavy losses and there was no prospect of success and it was "dubious" whether the troops could attack again on 16 May. At 15:40, Breith—wounded in the face by a shell fragment—turned up at division headquarters. He had spent three hours in a shellhole playing dead under heavy artillery fire. Stever was convinced a renewed attack on 16 May would not be possible. At 20:00, XVI Corps notified 4th Panzer Division that the attack would be renewed only on 17 May, without 4th Panzer Division. That afternoon, Hauptmann Jungenfeld (one of his company commanders) sent a tank to try to rescue Breith. The machine took four hits and withdrew. Jungenfeld and his men were happy to retreat. Several companies were pinned down under fire.

Eventually, several German medium tanks crossed the anti-tank obstacle before a large factory which their artillery had shelled and under cover of their fire, the infantry started to advance. But French anti-tank guns engaged the tanks, which abandoned the infantry. Finally the infantry attempted to charge forward, moving into close contact with the French infantry, but they could get no more than a few hundred meters in the area of a railroad yard. As darkness fell the infantry retreated.

=== Corbais ===
The situation of 3rd Panzer Division was different. It had committed only a fraction of its tanks and one of its three rifle battalions had not yet been heavily engaged. During the afternoon 3rd Panzer Division was troubled by reports from the neighbouring 18th Infantry Division of French armoured counterattacks toward the division's right flank. At 13:00, 88 mm Flak and tanks of 5th Panzer Regiment moved to the Perbais area to ward off this threat. At 15:55 air reconnaissance reported tanks and riflemen on the railroad line between Ernage and Chastre (although an enemy fighter disrupted observation). At 16:48, 3rd Panzer Brigade reported effective enemy artillery fire. At 18:00, units of 3rd Rifle Brigade began withdrawing from Perbais. The 3rd Panzer Brigade ordered tanks forward to stem the retreat, but at 18:20 the 3rd Panzer Brigade reported breaking through the anti-tank obstacle northwest of Ernage under heavy fire and enemy armoured counterattack from the west and Panzer Brigade called for artillery support. At almost the same instant, the 18th Infantry Division reported enemy armour attacking on both sides of Corbais. At 20:00, a captured enemy map arrived, showing the French dispositions. The intelligence officer of 3rd Panzer Division concluded that the situation was ripe for an attempt to break through. He travelled to corps headquarters to propose this but, as noted above, the proposal contradicted orders from 6th Army and was dropped. Most of the tanks spent the day on standby around Orbais.

Infantry of 3rd Panzer began to withdraw from Perbais in the afternoon, spurred on by French artillery when reports came through of approaching French armour. But then the situation changed complexion. Two companies of III Battalion of the 3rd Rifle Regiment preceded with a company or so of tanks from Ernage westwards at about 18:00. Despite intense French resistance from Chastre, where German sources reported a few Hotchkiss tanks (which, if they existed, could only have come from the 3d DLM), the infantry succeeded in reaching two hills west of Noirmont, the original objective of 3rd Panzer Division on 14 May, pulling forward with them elements of II Battalion which had been holding the line. A French tank and infantry counter-attack struck their open flank. The 6th Panzer Regiment sent forward reinforcements including one Panzer III and five Panzer Is.

The German formation was tipped off to the presence of French armour by Luftwaffe reconnaissance. Twelve French tanks followed by Moroccan infantry attacked them from the flank. The Germans claimed to have destroyed six tanks and dispersed the Moroccans. Following, a machine gun company drove two kilometres forward without loss, capturing much materiel but running out of ammunition. At that point, German accounts claimed, French fire reopened on them and two French tanks appeared, destroying the Panzer III and three of the Panzer Is. After this, III Battalion halted before the French defence in the Cortil-Noirmont area. At 20:54, an order arrived from XVI Corps to stop the attack, followed by another from the brigade to withdraw behind the railroad line.

Hoepner finally ordered the forward units of 3rd Panzer to hold their positions. In the meantime, however, almost the whole of 3rd Rifle Regiment and its supporting tanks pulled back. Its I and II Battalions were exhausted and had not been resupplied for 36 hours. The opportunity to break through the French defences, if it ever really existed, was lost.

=== Battle of Ernage ===
From the point of view of the DM, the afternoon saw bitter fighting on the northern flank. Its weakest point was on the left at Ernage, where the 1st Battalion of the 7th Moroccan Regiment, had the Moroccan company encircled in the village. It had lost contact with the neighbouring 110th Infantry Regiment at midday when enemy infantry crossed the railroad line between Ernage and Perbais. At 12:30, they effected a retreat to the headquarters of the 2nd Battalion of the 7th Moroccan Regiment, holding the stop-line at Cortil-Noirmont. In Ernage, the 7th Moroccan Regiment fought on until 18:00. Just 12 men including the commanding officer—all wounded and having exhausted all means of defence—surrendered.

General Albert Mellier originally intended to counterattack on his left with tanks of the La Font brigade and 3rd Battalion of the 7th Moroccans Regiment. Learning that the tanks were not available, he had the 3rd Battalion reinforce the defence behind Ernage, although Ju 87 attacks slowed its movement despite the intervention of one fighter aircraft which brought down two Ju 87s. At about 14:00, the reserve reestablished contact with a company of the 110th Infantry at Villeroux, but the situation remained critical and the headquarters of the 7th Moroccan Regiment and its supporting artillery battalion began to retreat toward St. Gery. Just then, Mellier arrived on the stop-line on his motorcycle. Under fire, he rallied them and along with the divisional artillery, stopped the withdrawal. At 16:00, the remaining two companies of the 1st Battalion of the 7th Moroccans Regiment fought their way back and prolonged the front toward Chastre, stabilising the situation. The 3rd Battalion was ordered back to dig in at Les Communes, although German artillery fire, profiting from the spotting of an observation balloon, wounded the battalion commander. The 1st Battalion of the 2nd Moroccan Regiment to the right also suffered heavily. There were signs of panic among the badly blooded troops. Mellier sent word that a counter-attack would support them and they were to hold in place. Around 13:00, powerful air attacks followed by renewed tank and infantry assaults struck, while the air attacks delayed the French counterattack. The two French companies on the railroad line were submerged, but the enemy got no further than the sunken road several hundred meters to the rear. The 5th Company at Cortil-Couvent noted heavy weapons abandoned by their crews. The First Company of the 1st Battalion, 2nd Moroccan Regiment retreated that evening to the stop-line, where the last cartridges were distributed.

Meanwhile, the counter-attack Mellier ordered at 11:30 began, Jean Ragaine's 35th Tank Battalion attacking with Captain Saut's 3rd Battalion of the 2nd Moroccan Regiment. The attack was mounted from reserve positions some 8 km (5.0 mi) from its objective, the railroad line from Ernage to Gembloux. This arrangement violated Aymes's Operations Order No. 4 of 13 May demanding immediate counter-attack against Panzer incursions. The 9th Company of Moroccans was to attack on the left with a company of R35 tanks and 11th Company with another company of Renaults on the right, while 10th Company and the battalion heavy weapons company were in reserve. Each company received a section of machineguns and one 25 mm anti-tank gun. A special detachment was to cover the open northern flank of the counter-attack formation.

The attackers assembled at 14:30 and reached the stop-line at about 16:30. The long procession of this formation forward from the rear made surprise impossible. Once on the stop-line the formation was hit by massive bombing. Captain Alloy, the Chief of Staff of the tank battalion, claimed that 80 bombers were involved. One tank was overturned, their artillery support was disrupted, but the attack continued. The German air assaults separated the French tanks and infantry, something French doctrine forbade. German combined arms fire stopped the attack. The Moroccan infantry went to ground, there was little support from artillery and the French command tank had been knocked out in a French minefield. The tanks took the German anti-tank defences by surprise, but were unable to make progress. By 18:30, the attack was over.

=== French disengagement ===
So far, the French First Army had held its own against all odds, but the rapid penetration at Sedan to the south of First Army threatened its flank and rear. The tanks of the 2nd DLM, most of the reconnaissance battalions and even some of the infantry reserves were siphoned off to cover the deepening right flank. That morning Billotte warned First Army to prepare to retreat if circumstances dictated. Pivoting on Wavre, around 20:00 First Army received the order to begin a phased withdrawal to the Franco—Belgian frontier. Meanwhile, IV Corps provided a defensive screen and fought off the German tanks.

At 14:00, IV Corps received false reports that Perbais and Chastre were lost and thus contact between 7th Moroccan Regiment and the 110th Infantry was broken. While the battle thus approached its climax, IV Corps received the order at 15:00 to begin to retreat on its right. At the same time, the 3rd Battalion of the 7th Moroccan Regiment in reserve, was engaged at Cortil-Noirmont to reestablish liaison with the 110th Infantry Regiment. At 16:00, a counterattack with 35th Tank Battalion and 3rd Battalion of the 2nd Moroccan Regiment was launched. Although the infantry lost heavily and only a handful of tanks survived intact, Aymes was informed (mistakenly) that the main position of resistance was reestablished. At 18:00, new German attacks were reported against the 7th Moroccans, a few Panzers infiltrating as far as St. Gery where elements of the divisional reconnaissance battalion stopped them.

At the same time, the regiments of 15th DIM received orders for their retreat that evening, while at 18:30 they checked an armoured attack on Beuzet with artillery and antitank fire. At 20:00, the DM issued orders for the withdrawal of the division, while the 7th Moroccan Regiment counterattacked a last German assault with success. German riflemen before Gembloux began withdrawing. That night both sides pulled back, the Germans to escape the enemy to their front, the French to escape the enemy to their right rear, easing the disengagement of the DM.

== Aftermath ==
=== Analysis ===
Along the front the German assault had been checked. At no time did the German thrust reach the French artillery positions, the backbone of their defences. They remained intact. Meanwhile, Schwedler's IV Corps had been prevented from crossing the Dyle River to the north. Of the crossings, only Limal remained in German hands by midnight. The 19th Infantry Regiment of the 7th Infantry Division was forced to abandon their position here as well, early on 16 May. III Corps had sometimes struggled to prevent a breakthrough, but succeeded despite serious German efforts. The British 2nd Infantry Division delivered a counter-attack, which panicked the 31st Infantry Division and a powerful artillery bombardment to allow the 2nd DM to disengage. It did so under darkness and unhindered. The British contribution—though not part of the Battle of Gembloux—aided the French retreat.

The Allied success at Gembloux was nullified by the German victory further south, but Reichenau's failure to destroy or at least defeat the Allied corps de bataille at Gembloux was crucial. It is true that the Allied high command proved unable in the days following to utilize the corps de bataille to restore the Allied front. But it took the Wehrmacht another two weeks of fighting to encircle and capture part of First Army, allowing the rest and the bulk of the BEF to escape to Dunkirk

— Gunsburg

=== Casualties ===
Following the battle, the 3rd Panzer Division had suffered 20-25 percent of its AFVs knocked out. The 4th Panzer had suffered 45–50 percent casualties in AFVs. The 12th Rifle Regiment, 4th Panzer, had lost a third of its officers; its First Battalion was left with just four officers and 31 men from a complement of 700. The Third Rifle Regiment, 3rd Panzer, lost 15 officers and 184 other ranks. Total losses for the 4th Panzer on 15 May were 105 dead, 413 wounded and 29 missing. In the Moroccan Division, the 1st Battalion 2nd Regiment ended the battle with 74 men from 700; first battalion 7th Moroccans had only 80 men left; and 2nd Battalion 7th Moroccans had only 150 men left. On the whole the DM lost about 2,000 men as casualties; 27 percent of the division. The IV Corps suffered a few hundred casualties, French III Corps rather more. First battalion 1st DM suffered 100 killed and only had 100 left out of 700.
