= Battle of Gembloux =

Battle of Gembloux may refer to:

- Battle of Gembloux (1578)
- Battle of Gembloux (1940)
