= Cavalry Corps =

Cavalry Corps may refer to:

- Cavalry Corps (France)
- Cavalry Corps (Ireland)
- Cavalry corps (Red Army)
- Cavalry Corps (Union Army)
- Cavalry Corps (United Kingdom)
