= 336th Infantry Division =

- German: 336. Infanterie-Division
- Active: 1940–1944
- Country: Nazi Germany
- Branch: Army
- Type: Infantry
- Size: Division
- Garrison/HQ: Naumburg
- Engagements: Second World War: Second Battle of Kharkov; Case Blue; Melitopol Offensive; Crimean Offensive

The 336th Infantry Division (German: 336. Infanterie-Division) was an infantry division of the German Army during the Second World War, active from 1940 to 1944. It saw active service in France and on the Eastern Front. Largely destroyed during the Crimean Offensive, it surrendered to the Soviets at Sevastopol in May 1944.

== Operational history ==
The 336th Infantry Division was formed in Naumburg in December 1940 under the command of Generalmajor (Note: The rank of generalmajor is equivalent to that of brigadier general in the United States Army.) Johann Stever. The division nominally fell within the responsibility of Wehrkreis IV and was one of several static divisions raised for service in the occupied countries of Western Europe. It was formed around three battalions transferred from the 61st Infantry Division and three battalions from the 256th Infantry Division. Both of the donor divisions were experienced, having participated in the Invasion of Poland and the Battle of the Netherlands, respectively.

The 336th was soon sent to Western Europe, firstly Belgium for a month in May 1941, then onto Le Havre in France. In April 1942, it was posted to Brittany. It was then moved to the Eastern Front the following month and soon participated in the Second Battle of Kharkov. After this, it was transferred to the 2nd Hungarian Army under which it fought in Case Blue, the Wehrmacht's offensive in southern Russia in the summer of 1942. After this, it was involved in the attempt to relieve the 6th Army at Stalingrad. Later that year, it was engaged on the Mius-Front and the subsequent fighting around Melitopol, as part of the Panther–Wotan line.

Dispatched to the Crimea in November 1943, when the Soviets launched their Crimean Offensive six months later, the 336th was stationed on the Perekop Isthmus. It took heavy casualties during the Soviet assault, including the divisional commander, Generalmajor Wolf Hagemann, who was medically evacuated. What was left of the division retreated into Sevastopol where it eventually surrendered to the Soviets along with the rest of the city's defenders on 9 May 1944. Some personnel did manage to avoid surrender by getting evacuated by sea; the surviving infantry were assigned to the 294th Infantry Division while what was left of the staff officers were posted to 237th Infantry Division.

== Commanders ==
- Generalmajor Johann Stever (15 December 1940 – 28 February 1942);
- Generalmajor Walther Lucht (1 March 1942 – 30 June 1943);
- Generalmajor Wilhelm Kunze (1 July – 15 August 1943; 1 September – 7 December 1943);
- Oberst (Note: The rank of oberst is equivalent to that of colonel in the United States Army.) Werner von Bülow (15–30 August 1943); (Note: Bulow was acting commander only, in place of Kunze, but went missing in action on 30 August 1943.)
- Oberst Wolf Hagemann (8 December 1943 – 1944). (Note: Ranks stated are those at the time of taking command.)

== Notes ==
Footnotes

Citations
