= Horst Stumpff =

German general in World War II

- Born: 20 November 1887; Gießen, Hessen
- Died: 25 November 1958 (aged 71); Hamburg
- Relatives: Hans-Jürgen Stumpff (brother)
- Military career
- Allegiance: German Empire; Weimar Republic; Nazi Germany
- Branch: German Army
- Service years: 1907–1945
- Rank: General der Panzertruppe
- Commands: 3rd Panzer Division; 20th Panzer Division
- Conflicts: World War I; World War II; Invasion of Poland; Battle of Belgium; Battle of Hannut; Battle of Gembloux; Battle of France; Battle of Dunkirk; Siege of Lille; Eastern Front; Operation Barbarossa; Battle of Minsk; Battle of Smolensk; Battle of Kiev; Battle of Moscow
- Awards: Knight's Cross of the Iron Cross

Horst Stumpff (20 November 1887 – 25 November 1958) was a German general in the Wehrmacht during World War II. He was a recipient of the Knight's Cross of the Iron Cross.

On 1 January 1938 Stumpff was given command of the 3rd Panzer Brigade and on 1 March 1939 he was promoted to Generalmajor and led the brigade during the invasion of Poland. On 7 October 1939 he was appointed commander of the 3rd Panzer Division and in November 1940 he was given command of the new 20th Panzer Division and promoted to Generalleutnant on 1 February 1941. He led the division on the Eastern Front and on 29 September 1941 he was awarded the Knight's Cross of the Iron Cross, but he was moved to the Führerreserve shortly afterwards.

In April 1942 Stumpff was appointed as the military inspector of the recruiting area Königsberg. In July 1944 he became the Inspector General of the Panzer troops in the replacement army and he was promoted to General der Panzertruppe in 1944. He died in Hamburg aged 71.

== Awards ==
- Knight's Cross of the Iron Cross on 29 September 1941 as Generalleutnant and commander of the 20. Panzer-Division

Military offices
Preceded by Generalleutnant Leo Geyr von Schweppenburg	Commander of 3. Panzer-Division; 7 October 1939 – September 1940	Succeeded by Generalleutnant Friedrich Kühn
Preceded by Generalleutnant Friedrich Kühn	Commander of 3. Panzer-Division; 4 October 1940 – 13 November 1940	Succeeded by Generalleutnant Walter Model
Preceded by —	Commander of 20. Panzer-Division; 13 November 1940 – 10 September 1941	Succeeded by Oberst Georg von Bismarck
