= Walther Lucht =

German general (1882–1949)

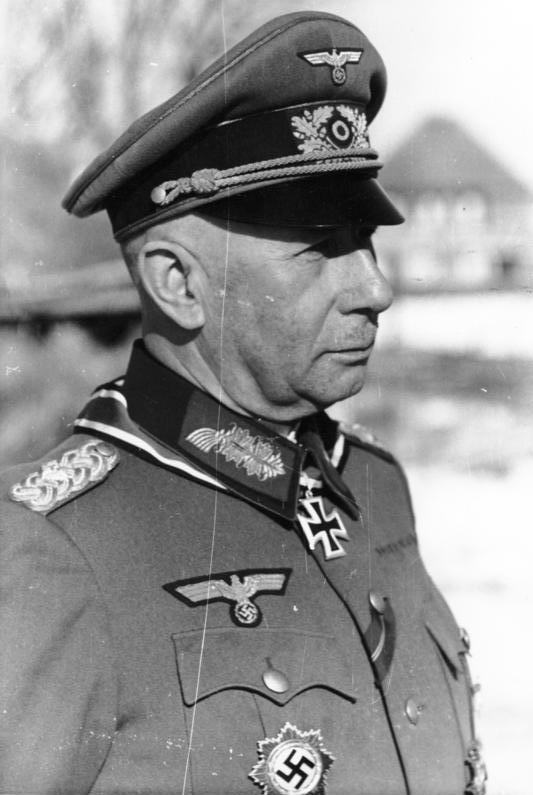
- Born: 26 February 1882; Berlin, Kingdom of Prussia, German Empire
- Died: 18 March 1949 (aged 67); Heilbronn, US Zone, Allied-occupied Germany
- Military career
- Allegiance: German Empire; Weimar Republic; Nazi Germany
- Branch: Imperial German Army; Prussian Army; Reichswehr; German Army
- Service years: 1901–1932; 1937–1945
- Rank: General der Artillerie
- Commands: 87th Infantry Division; 336th Infantry Division; LXVI Army Corps; 11th SS Panzer Army
- Conflicts: World War I; Spanish Civil War; World War II; Battle of France; Battle of the Caucasus; Battle of the Bulge
- Awards: Knight's Cross of the Iron Cross with Oak Leaves; German Cross

Walther Lucht (26 February 1882 – 18 March 1949) was a German general in the Wehrmacht during World War II who held commands at division, corps and army levels. He was a recipient of the Knight's Cross of the Iron Cross with Oak Leaves of Nazi Germany. Lucht was released from an American POW camp in 1948, and died in a car crash in 1949.

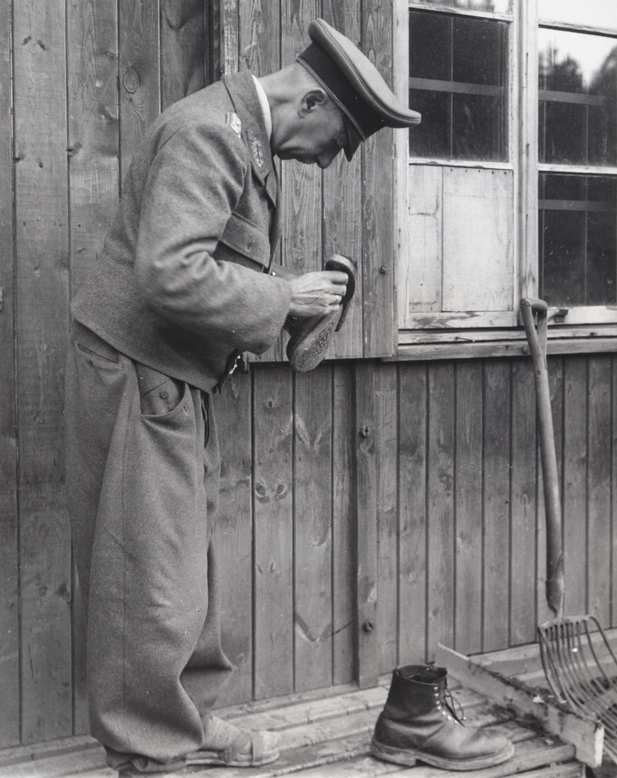
Walther Lucht cleaning his shoes outside his bunkhouse in a POW camp

== Awards and decorations ==
- Iron Cross (1914) 2nd Class (14 October 1914) & 1st Class (19 October 1915)
- Hanseatic Cross of Hamburg
- Military Merit Cross, 3rd class with War Decoration (Austria-Hungary)
- Honour Cross of the World War 1914/1918
- Clasp to the Iron Cross (1939) 2nd Class (17 May 1940) & 1st Class (23 June 1940)
- German Cross in Gold on 12 March 1942 as Generalmajor and commander of 87. Infanterie-Division
- Knight's Cross of the Iron Cross with Oak Leaves
  - Knight's Cross on 30 January 1943 as Generalmajor and commander of 336. Infanterie-Division
  - 691st Oak Leaves on 9 January 1945 as General der Artillerie and commander of LXVI. Armeekorps

Military offices
Preceded by Generalleutnant Bogislav von Studnitz	Commander of 87. Infanterie-Division; 17 February 1942 – 1 March 1942	Succeeded by Generalleutnant Bogislav von Studnitz
Preceded by Generalleutnant Johann Stever	Commander of 336th Infantry Division; 1 March 1942 – 1 July 1943	Succeeded by Generalmajor Wilhelm Kunze
Preceded by General der Infanterie Wilhelm Wetzel	Commander of LXVI Reservekorps; 1 November 1943 – 5 August 1944	Succeeded by Redesignated LXVI. Armeekorps
Preceded by Previously LXVI. Reservekorps	Commander of LXVI Armeekorps; 5 August 1944 – March 1945	Succeeded by Generalleutnant Hermann Flörke
Preceded by General der Infanterie Otto Hitzfeld	Commander of 11. Armee; 8 April 1945 – 23 April 1945	Succeeded by None
Preceded by General der Infanterie Walther Hahm	Commander of XIII. Armeekorps; April 1945 – May 1945	Succeeded by None
