= Cavalry Corps (France) =

French mechanized army corps (1939–40)

Corps de Cavalerie
- Active: 27 August 1939 - 11 July 1940
- Country: France
- Type: Army Corps
- Role: Mechanized warfare
- Mottos: Premier et dernier au feu (First and last under fire)
- Engagements: World War II: Battle of Hannut; Battle of Gembloux

Commanders
- Notable commanders: René Prioux

The Cavalry Corps (French: Corps de Cavalerie) was a French mechanized army corps established in 1939 and inactivated in 1940 after the defeat of France by Germany. Commanded by General René Prioux, the Cavalry Corps advanced into Belgium in May 1940 and imposed significant delay on the advance of the German XVI (motorized) Corps. Cut off by German forces from the bulk of the French Army, the corps was evacuated to England and then shipped back to France in late May and early June 1940. Further combat resulted in significant losses of armored vehicles and a steady deterioration of the corps' combat power. The Cavalry Corps ceased fighting as the Second Armistice at Compiègne took effect, and the corps was demobilized on July 11, 1940.

== Formation and Phony War ==
Formed on August 27, 1939 in Saint-Quentin, the Cavalry Corps did not see action until May 11, 1940 in the vicinity of Tongres. The corps had various units assigned during the period of the Phony War, but by the time of the German invasion in May 1940, the corps commanded the 2nd and 3rd Light Mechanized Divisions (French: Division Légère Mécanique) (DLM), as well as some small reconnaissance and artillery units.

== Combat ==
The Cavalry Corps saw action in three distinct phases of the fighting in 1940. These were the Battle of the Dyle (10 to 18 May), the Battle of the North (19 May to 9 June), and the Retreat of the Left Wing (10 to 25 June). In general, these phases respectively refer to the fighting in Belgium in May, the fighting in northern France in early June, and the long retreat of the French Army into the south of France during mid to late June. The Cavalry Corps in particular was noted for its solid performance during the Battles of Hannut and Gembloux during the fighting in Belgium. At the same time that poorly trained French reservists were being defeated at Sedan, the Cavalry Corps met the German XVI (motorized) Corps of two Panzer divisions on equal terms at Hannut and in the Gembloux Gap.

From May 31 until June 10, 1940, the men of the corps were evacuated to England and then returned to France via the ports of Brest and Cherbourg.

At the end of the retreat of the French forces, the Cavalry Corps was made up of the 1st DLM and 3rd DLM. The 1st DLM regrouped at Ribérac and the 3rd DLM assembled at Saint-Aquilin, both in the region of the river Dordogne. The Cavalry Corps was demobilized on July 11, 1940.

== Commanders ==
- 09/02/1939 – 05/25/1940 Lieutenant-General René Prioux
- 05/25/1940 – 07/11/1940 Major-General Langlois

== Notes and sources ==
- (GUF) Guerre 1939 - 1945. Les Grandes Unités Françaises. Volume 1. Armée de Terre, Service Historique. Paris: Imprimerie Nationale, 1967.
- www.axishistory.com - the Cavalry Corps in 1940
