= Crehen =

District of Hannut, Belgium

Coordinates: 50°40′N 5°03′E

Crehen (Walloon: Crehin, pronounced [kʀɛ.'hɛ̃]) is a village of Wallonia and a district of the municipality of Hannut, Belgium.
