= Georges Maurice Jean Blanchard =

WW2 French Army general (1877–1954)

Georges Maurice Jean Blanchard (9 December 1877 in Orléans – 22 November 1954 in Neuilly-sur-Seine) (Note: Some sources give a birth date of 1890) was a French military officer. He served in the French Army in World War I on the Western Front. During World War II, General Blanchard commanded the French First Army, which advanced into Belgium during the Nazi invasion of the country and played an instrumental role in enabling the evacuation of Anglo-French troops from France during the Battle of Dunkirk.

== Military career ==
=== World War I: 1914–1918 ===
During World War I, he served on the Western Front against the Germans.

=== Interwar period: 1918–1939 ===
From 1927 to 1930 Blanchard was the deputy chief of staff for the French Army of the Rhine. From 1930 to 1932 Blanchard was chief of staff to General Adolphe Guillaumat. In 1932 he was promoted to general, and commanded the artillery of the 2nd Military Region. From 1935 to 1938 Blanchard was commanding general of the 7th Military Region. In 1938 and 1939 he was a member of France's Supreme War Council, director of the Centre des hautes études militaires (Centre of Military High Studies) and Inspector-General for the Centres of Higher Military Education.

=== World War II: 1939–1940 ===
Blanchard was appointed to command the First Army on 2 September 1939. The First Army encountered German armored forces at the Battle of Hannut in May 1940 with success but was forced to fall back to Lille after other French and Allied formations started to retreat. Blanchard took over the First French Army Group on 23 May 1940 following the accidental death of General Gaston Billotte. At Lille and Dunkirk, the First Army Group provided a blocking force that permitted the evacuation of Dunkirk. The First Army Group ceased to exist on 29 May 1940, six days after Blanchard took command. After a time as inspector of the 9th and 12th Military Regions for the Vichy regime, he retired in 1940.

Blanchard was awarded the Grand Cross of the Legion of Honour in early June 1940 by French premier Paul Reynaud at the recommendation of Maxime Weygand, in honor of his actions which allowed the escape of so many soldiers at Dunkirk. Blanchard died on November 23, 1954.
