= Johann Stever =

Johann Joachim Stever
- Born: 1889
- Died: 1945?
- Military career
- Allegiance: Nazi Germany
- Branch: Army
- Rank: Generalleutnant
- Commands: 4th Panzer Division; 336th Infantry Division
- Conflicts: World War II: Invasion of the Low Countries; Battle of France

Johann Joachim Stever (1889 – 1945?) was a German officer in the Heer branch of the Wehrmacht during World War II who also served in the army of Imperial Germany during World War I. During World War II, he commanded the 4th Panzer Division for a period of time in 1940. He later commanded the 336th Infantry Division and was then a military area commander in occupied Russia. Promoted to generalleutnant in 1941, he retired from active duty in 1944. He fell into Soviet custody as they advanced into Germany in 1945 and, having not been seen since, is believed to have died shortly thereafter.

== Biography ==
Stever was born in Berlin in 1889 and volunteered for the Prussian Army in 1908 as a Fahnen-junker (officer cadet). After World War I, he served in the Reichswehr (Imperial Defence) and by 1938, he had risen to the position of chief of staff of the Wehrmacht's XV Motorised Corps. In April 1940, and now a generalmajor (Note: The rank of generalmajor is equivalent to that of brigadier general in the United States Army.) he was given command of the 4th Panzer Division and led it through the invasion of the Low Countries the following month. It then moved into France and was involved in the fighting around Dunkirk and then to the west of the country. He was replaced as divisional commander in late July, after the completion of the French Campaign.

In December 1940, Stever was appointed commander of the 336th Infantry Division, which was part of a series of static divisions raised for service in the occupied countries of Western Europe. The 336th was soon sent to Western Europe, firstly Belgium for a month in May 1941, then onto Le Havre in France. In April 1942, it was posted to Brittany, but by then Stever had left the division due to his health. He had been promoted to generalleutnant (Note: The rank of generalleutnant is equivalent to that of major general in the United States Army.) the previous June.

In mid-1942, following a period of recuperation, Stever was posted to the occupied sector of Russia as the commander of Oberfeldkommandantur 399 (military area command). However, by 1943, in poor health, he returned to Germany and retired from active service the following year. When the Soviets advanced into Germany in 1945, he fell into their custody and is believed to have died shortly thereafter as he has not been seen since.

== See also ==
- List of people who disappeared mysteriously: 1910–1990

== Notes ==
Footnotes

Citations

Military offices
Preceded by Generalmajor Ludwig von Radlmeier	Commander of 4th Panzer Division; 6 April 1940 – 24 July 1940	Succeeded by Oberst Hans von Boineburg-Lengsfeld
Preceded by —	Commander of 336th Infantry Division; 15 December 1940 – 28 February 1942	Succeeded by Generalmajor Walther Lucht
