= Gaston Billotte =

French military officer

Gaston-Henri Billotte
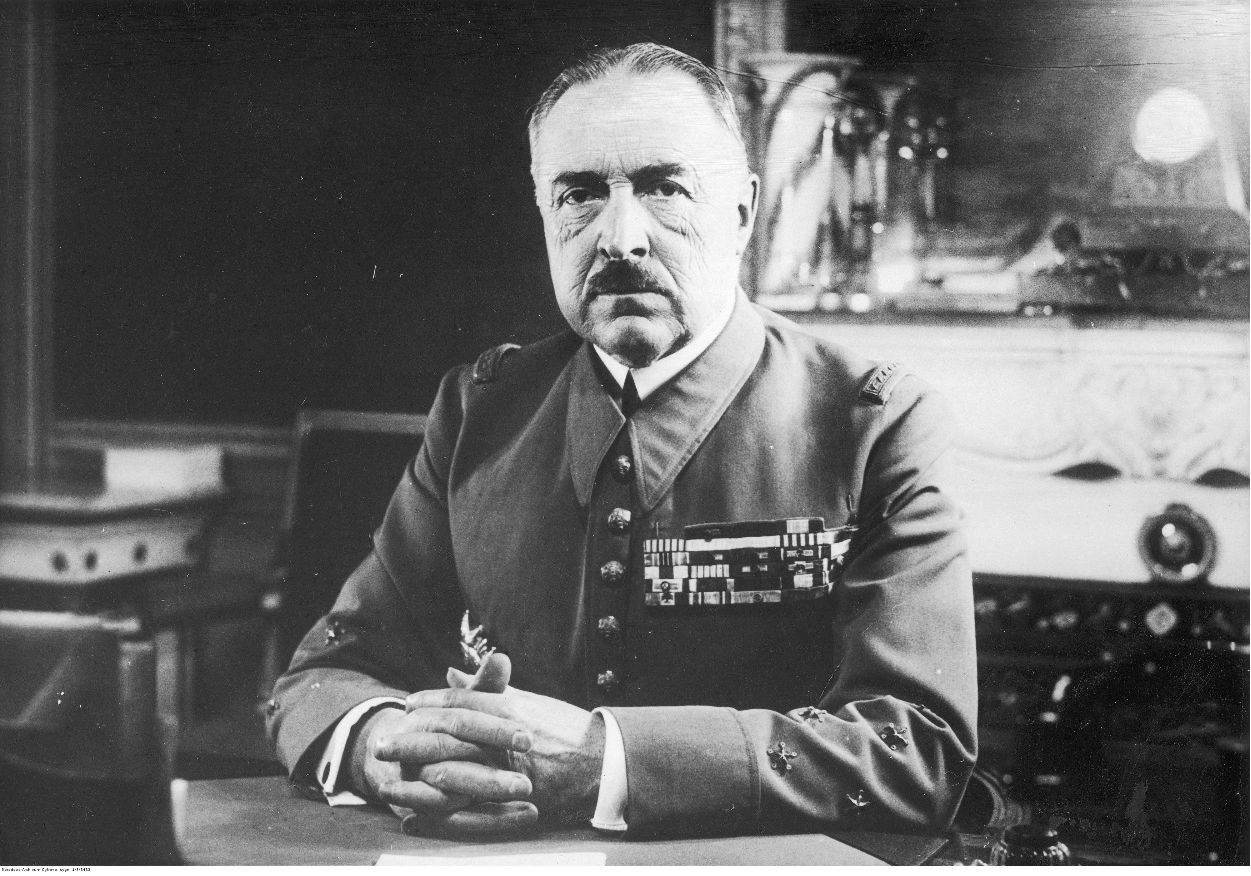
- Born: Gaston-Henri Billotte; 10 February 1875; Sommeval, France
- Died: 23 May 1940 (aged 65); Ypres, Belgium
- Military career
- Allegiance: French Third Republic
- Branch: French Army
- Rank: Général d'Armée
- Commands: French First Army Group
- Conflicts: World War I Rif War; World War II
- Awards: Grand Cross of the Legion of Honor

Gaston-Henri Billotte (10 February 1875 – 23 May 1940) was a French military officer best known for his central role in the failure of the French Army to defeat the German invasion of France in May 1940. He was killed in a car accident at the height of the battle.

== Military career ==
=== World War I: 1914–1918 ===
Billotte graduated from the Saint-Cyr military academy in 1896 and joined the infantry.

In World War I he served as a brigade commander and as an officer of the General Staff.

=== Interwar period: 1918–1939 ===
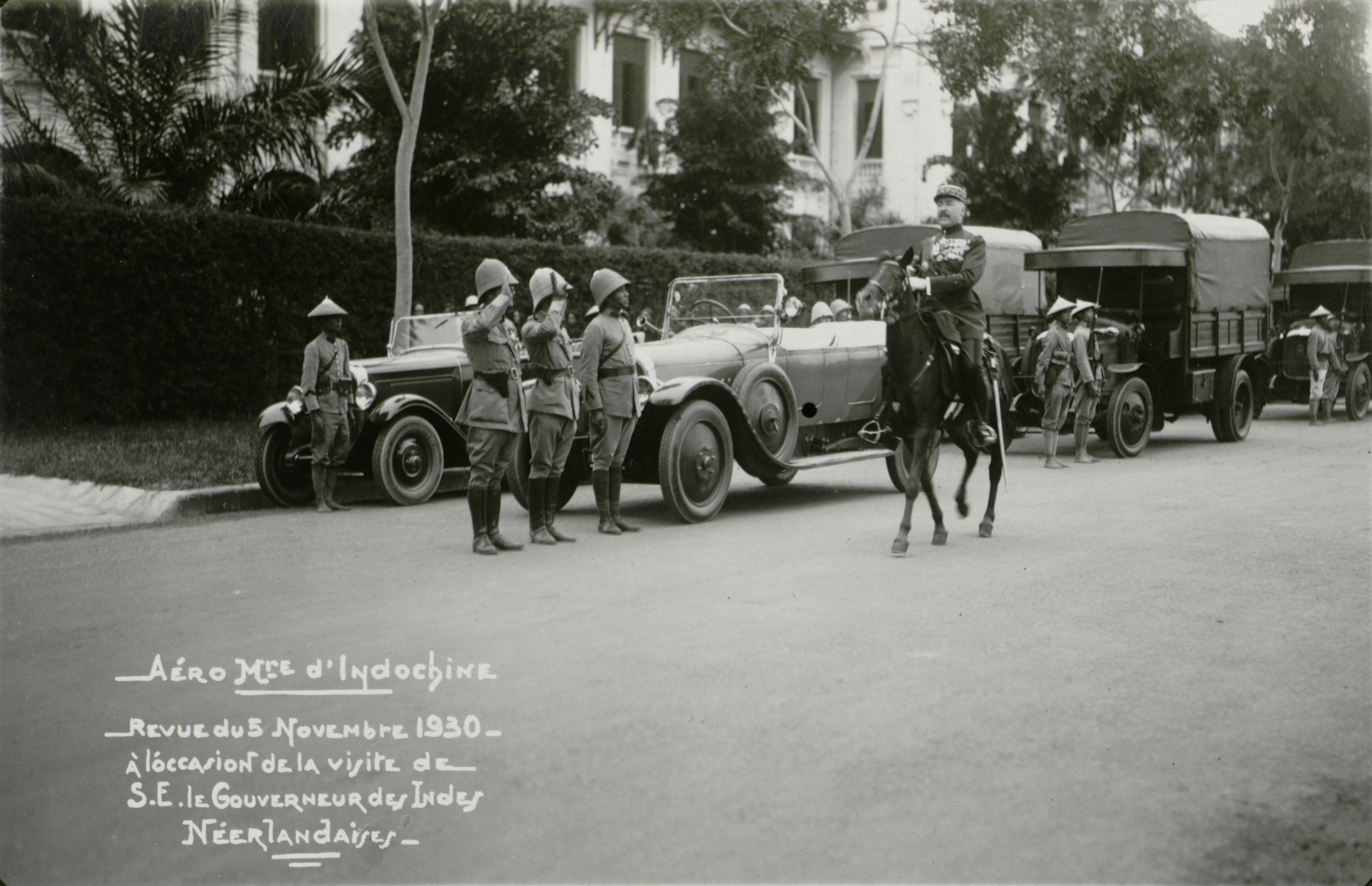
General Billotte in Hanoi, French Indochina, 1930.

In 1919 and 1920 he was head of the French Military Mission in Poland. He served the rest of the 1920s and 1930s in colonial posts, in French Syria, French Tunisia, French Morocco and French Indochina, where he was Commander-in-Chief from 1930 to 1932. He was promoted to general in 1927. In 1933 Billotte returned to France, where he served as a Member of the Supreme War Council, President of the Consultative Committee for Colonial Defence and Military Governor of Paris.

=== World War II: 1939–1940 ===
When World War II broke out in September 1939, Billotte was 64 and close to retirement, but he was appointed Commander in Chief of the 1st Army Group based in northern France adjacent to the Belgian border. When the Germans attacked on 10 May, Billotte's forces advanced into Belgium under the agreed Allied plan, on the assumption that the Germans would repeat their invasion of Belgium in World War I, attacking through Belgium into northern France, and then advance on Paris. According to the Manstein Plan, the German attack in Belgium was a feint designed to draw the Allied forces northwards, while the real German assault was aimed at the Ardennes sector further south. Like all the Allied commanders, Billotte failed to discern the German plan.

On 12 May Billotte was given the task of co-ordinating the operations of the French, Belgian and British armies in Belgium. He lacked the staff and the experience for this task, and is reported to have burst into tears when informed of it. He failed to co-operate with the British commander, General Lord Gort, and the Belgian commander, King Leopold. By 15 May Billotte's morale was "at rock bottom." After a meeting with Gort on 18 May, he remarked to a British officer: "I'm shattered and I can't do anything against these Panzers."

On 20 May the British government, alarmed at the situation, sent the Chief of the Imperial General Staff, General Edmund Ironside, to confer with Gort and Billotte. Ironside later wrote: "I found Billotte and Blanchard all in a state of complete depression. No plan, no thought of a plan. Ready to be slaughtered. Defeated at the head without casualties... I lost my temper and shook Billotte by the button of his tunic. The man is completely beaten." Ironside effectively took over the co-ordinating role from Billotte and organised an unsuccessful attack southwards towards Arras in the hope of checking the German advance.

Finally realising the threat posed by the rapid German advance from the Ardennes towards the sea, the French commander-in-chief, General Maxime Weygand, ordered Billotte to withdraw his forces southwards. At a meeting in Ypres on 21 May, Weygand found Billotte depressed and pessimistic, "heavily marked by the fatigues and anxieties of the past two weeks." After leaving this conference, Billotte was severely injured when his staff car was involved in an accident, and died after two days in a coma. The British general Henry Pownall (Gort's Chief of Staff) said: "With all respect, he's no loss to us in this emergency."

Billotte's son Pierre Billotte also graduated from École spéciale militaire de Saint-Cyr in 1926; joined the Free French movement and had a distinguished military and political career in postwar France.
