= Mein Kampf in English =

English translations of Adolf Hitler's book

Since the early 1930s, the history of Adolf Hitler's Mein Kampf in English has been complicated and has been the occasion for controversy. Four full translations were completed before 1945, as well as a number of extracts in newspapers, pamphlets, government documents and unpublished typescripts. Not all of these had official approval from Hitler's publishers, Eher Verlag.

Since the war, the 1943 Ralph Manheim translation has been the most commonly published translation, though Manheim later expressed reservations about his translation, and other versions have continued to circulate.

== Dugdale abridgement ==
Eher Verlag took steps to secure the copyright and trademark rights to Mein Kampf in the United States in 1925 and 1927. In 1928, the literary agency Curtis Brown, Limited secured the assignment for negotiation of translation rights in the United States and Great Britain, and a German copy was picked up by their employee, Cherry Kearton. However, the firm found it difficult to interest publishers in the 782-page book by the leader of what was then an obscure splinter party in Germany. Even after the elections of September 1930, when the Nazi Party became the second largest party in the Reichstag, publishers were cautious about investing in a translation, due to the Great Depression.

The same election inspired Blanche Dugdale to urge her husband, E.T.S. Dugdale, to write an abridgement of Mein Kampf. Dugdale began his work on this abridgement in about 1931, but he, too, was unable to find a publisher for it. In early 1933, at the time of the Nazi seizure of power in Germany, Dugdale apparently contacted Eher Verlag, who referred him to Kearton, now working for the firm of Hurst and Blackett. The latter firm was in the process of buying the translation rights from Curtis Brown for a sum of £350. Dugdale offered the abridgment to Hurst & Blackett free of charge, with the stipulation that his name not be used for the British edition. Before the book could go to press, however, Hurst and Blackett were visited by Dr. Hans Wilhelm Thost, London correspondent of the Völkischer Beobachter and an active member of the "Nazi organization" in London. Although Eher Verlag was satisfied with Dugdale's abridgement, Thost insisted on taking a copy to Berlin for further censoring and official sanction. The abridgement was finally published in October 1933. Titled My Struggle the book was published as the second number in the Paternoster Library.

In the United States, Houghton Mifflin secured the rights to the Dugdale abridgement on 29 July 1933. The only differences between the American and British versions are that the title was translated My Struggle in the UK and My Battle in America; and that Dugdale is credited as translator in the US edition, while the British version withheld his name. The original price was $3.00 (equivalent to $75 in 2025).

In January 1937, Houghton Mifflin published a second edition after the first sold out. The price was lowered to $2.50 (equivalent to $56 in 2025). The publishers replaced the old dust jacket that showed Hitler giving his salute over a black and white background with a new one with panels of black, red, and yellow and a quotation from Dorothy Thompson. This led to an official protest by the Nazi government, as the black-red-yellow color scheme was emblematic of the liberal German revolutions of 1848–49 and the Weimar Republic, while the Nazis had returned to the black, white, red of the German Empire. Thompson's quotation was also objected to, as she had been expelled from the Reich in 1934 after writing unflattering accounts of Hitler. The affair lasted into March 1937. Houghton Mifflin agreed to change the yellow to white, but it is unknown whether the Dorothy Thompson quotation was ever removed.

=== Sales and royalties ===
The first printing was a deluxe 18-shilling (equivalent to £56 in 2025) book that sold out its 5,000 copies and was never reprinted. The popular edition cost 3s. 6d. (equivalent to £11 in 2025) and each print run was about 1,750 copies. Below is a table of available sales figures of the Dugdale abridgment in the United Kingdom. "On hand" here means on hand at the beginning of the year. The commission was payable to Curtis Brown as literary agent, and the tax to Inland Revenue.

Year	On hand	Editions	Printed	Sold	Gross royalties	Commission	Tax	Net royalties
1933	0	1–8	17,250	15,687	£350	£70	£84.7s.	£195.13/RM2,611
1934	1,275	9–10	3,500	4,695	£7.1.2	£15.4.4		£58.5.6/ RM 715
1935	79	11–12	3,500	2,989	£74.18.6	£14	£7.3	£52.15.1/RM653
1936	590	13–16	7,000	3,633	£243.14.1	£48.14.10	£36.17.5	£158.1.1/ RM1,941
1937	2,055	17–18	7,000	8,648	£173.4	£35.6	£23.3	£114.4 /RM1424
1938	16,442	19–22	25,500	53,738*	£1,037.23	£208	£193.91	£635.68 /RM 7410
Total	20,441	22	63,750	89,390	£1,884	£390	£344	£1213 /RM 14,754

- In 1938, "slightly over 8,000 were colonial sales".

The first printing of the U.S. Dugdale edition was 7,603 copies, of which 290 were given away as complimentary gifts. The royalty on the first printing in the U.S. was 15% or $3,206.45 total. Curtis Brown, literary agent, took 20%, or $641.20 total, and the IRS took $384.75, leaving Eher Verlag $2,180.37 or RM 5,668.

6 mon. ending	Sold
Mar. 1934	5,178
Sept. 1934	457
Mar. 1935	245
Sept. 1935	362
Mar. 1936	359
Sept. 1936	575
Jan. 1937	140
Total	7,316

The January 1937 second printing yielded gross royalties of $1,311.38. Once the commission to Curtis Brown and corporation taxes were deducted, this left $891.74 or RM2,318.52.

6 mon. ending	Sold
March 1937	1,170
Sept. 1937	1,451
March 1938	876
Total	3,497

There were three separate printings from August 1938 to March 1939, totaling 14,000; sales totals by 31 March 1939, were 10,345. This yielded gross royalties of $3,879.38 and a new of $2,637.98 or RM6,858.74.

== Translations ==
=== Murphy translation ===
The Reich Ministry of Public Enlightenment and Propaganda commissioned James Vincent Murphy, who had been employed to make English translations of Hitler's speeches and other items, to begin an English translation of Mein Kampf in late 1936 and it was finished by the fall of 1937. However, the Propaganda Ministry cancelled the project and sequestered all copies of the manuscript. Murphy was beginning to be seen as "unreliable" by the government and was dismissed from his position at the Ministry. As the international situation worsened in 1938, Murphy sent his wife and children to England to live with her mother. They arrived in Southampton in June, while James finished up the rest of his commissioned translation work in Berlin and came to London in early September.

In London, Murphy contacted his literary agent, Robert Somerville, and they found an interested publisher in Heinemann. However, they realized that translation rights in the United Kingdom and its dependencies already belonged to Hurst and Blackett. Furthermore, they did not have a manuscript in hand. So Murphy was convinced to return to Germany to secure both a copy of the manuscript and permission to publish it, but on the date he was scheduled to fly to Berlin, he was denied an entry visa and told he would be wasting his time. Therefore, his wife, Mary, decided to make the trip, finally crossing the Channel on 6 November 1938. In Berlin she was unable to schedule any appointments with the Propaganda Ministry until 10 November. This meant she was in Berlin during the Kristallnacht pogrom of 9 November. The next day she met with Heinrich Bohle at the Propaganda Ministry, but could not get anywhere. She pursued other contacts within the Ministry but came up empty handed. Finally, without any more money and living with her ex-house keeper, she decided to visit one of James' former secretaries whom he had employed as a typist. To her great relief, she still had one of the handwritten copies of the James Murphy translation. She left Berlin on 20 November.

Meanwhile, Hurst and Blackett had not yet decided whether to publish Murphy's manuscript, or any translation at all. On 21 November 1938, they received a message from Eher Verlag stating that they had not authorized Murphy to publish his edition in England, reiterating that Hurst and Blackett would be the publisher if any edition was ever released in England. Hurst and Blackett were informed that the American translations were going to go ahead on 31 December 1938 and decided to publish Murphy's translation in January 1939, despite their ambiguous legal standing (the contract with Eher Verlag did not explicitly say they could go ahead with a full translation). Unbeknownst to them, the various principals in Berlin and the German diplomats in the US were contacting each other, trying to find out what their position was with regards to the various translations. By the time the matter was finally sent to the Reichskanzlei in February 1939, the point had been rendered moot. Murphy's translation hit the stores in the United Kingdom on 20 March 1939.

While neither Hitler nor any of the German government officials endorsed the Murphy translation, they ultimately took no action against it and, by May 1939, Eher Verlag was inquiring about possible royalties. They were told that royalties would only be paid after six months in print. However, by then war had broken out between the two countries and copyright relations severed.

Because so many records were destroyed during the war, accurate sales figures on Murphy's translation are difficult to establish. Robert Sommerfeld reported that approximately 32,000 copies were sold by August 1939. There was also an illustrated edition and a serial edition in eight parts. It has been conjectured that 150,000–200,000 copies were sold in total. Murphy, for his part, did not feel he was adequately remunerated, being paid £250 up front and £150 six months later. The publishers did not feel the need to pay him any more after they received a letter from Germany prior to publication, stating he had already been paid for his efforts when he was employed by the Propaganda Ministry.

=== Stalag translation ===
The German Government used 90% of James Vincent Murphy's rough draft translation of Mein Kampf to form the body of an edition to be distributed in the UK once Operation Sea Lion was completed. This 'Operation Sea Lion Edition' was finalized and printed in the summer of 1940. Once the invasion was called off by Adolf Hitler most copies were distributed to English speaking POW camps. Very few copies survived after the war.

=== Reynal and Hitchcock translation ===
After the Munich crisis in September 1938, the firm of Reynal & Hitchcock decided that it would be imperative to have an unexpurgated edition available to the public. They found that a team of scholars at the New School of Social Research were in the midst of preparing such a translation. Reynal & Hitchcock approached both this committee and Houghton Mifflin about publishing the translation under a license.

However, on 8 December 1938, Stackpole Sons Inc. announced that they would be publishing their own translation of Mein Kampf, arguing that Hitler, as a stateless person in 1925, could not have transferred his copyrights to Eher Verlag and thence to Houghton Mifflin. A conference was held at the office of Reynal & Hitchcock on 12 December 1938, with General Edward J. Stackpole and William Soskin, executive director of Stackpole Sons, to discuss the matter. Stackpole claimed that Reynal & Hitchcock said that if Stackpole could put the work in the public domain they would not be interested in publishing their own translation. Reynal & Hitchcock claimed to have stated that they had already been working on the project for months, had a translation in hand, backed by a committee of prominent scholars, and were in the process of negotiating the rights with Houghton Mifflin. In any event, Stackpole and Soskin took this to mean that they were allowed to carry on with their translation unperturbed until they were visited at their office by Curtice Hitchcock who informed him that they were going ahead with their translation, which was going to be under license from the exclusive copyright holder, Houghton Mifflin.

The agreement between Reynal and Hitchcock and Houghton Mifflin was finalized on 18 February 1939 and the book was available in stores on 28 February. The contract stipulated that Reynal and Hitchcock would pay Houghton Mifflin 15% royalty on each $3 copy. After one year, Reynal and Hitchcock had the option of releasing a cheaper edition, and the agreement itself would expire after three years. Houghton Mifflin would print and bind the book at its Riverside Press in Cambridge, Massachusetts and was allowed to keep publishing the My Battle abridgement. Notably, Houghton Mifflin agreed to pay all the expenses for seeking a copyright injunction, and subsequent legal fees would be split between the two companies.

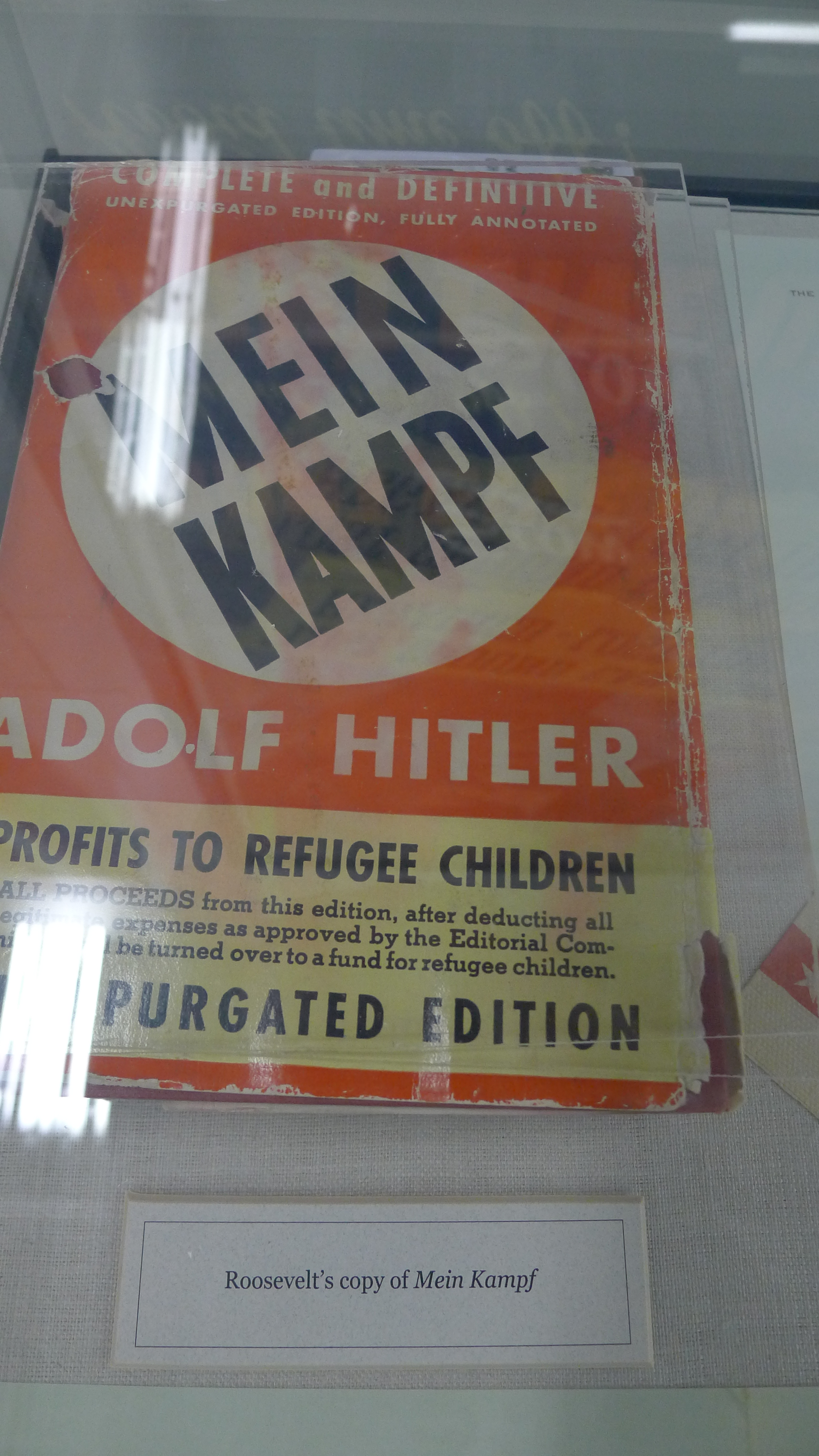
Franklin D. Roosevelt's copy of the Reynal and Hitchcock translation (The International Museum of World War II).

To counter Stackpole's claims that sales of its translation would go to Nazi Germany, Reynal contacted the various boycott committees and pledged all profits above their legitimate expenses would go to a charity for refugees. However, no assets could be touched for the Reynal and Hitchcock edition, including royalties or charitable donations, until the legal issues were settled. As it happened, the legal battle did not finally end until 25 October 1941. After deducting $11,500 for legal costs, Houghton Mifflin was prepared to give $11,500 to Curtis Brown to pay to their client, Eher Verlag. Before this could be done, however, war broke out between the United States and Germany and Eher never received any royalties from this edition. Profits from the book went to a charity, Children's Crusade for Children, which helped refugees. Included in this was the initial $35,000 for administrative and promotional costs, which also went to the child refugees.

As far as Hitler's royalties went, they were governed by the Trading with the Enemy Act of 1917 and put into an account assigned to the Office of Alien Property Custodian, succeeded by the United States Attorney General after the war. As of 31 March 1972 the royalties on Mein Kampf paid to the US government amounted to $92,616.59. The Attorney General also paid a corporation tax on them to the IRS. Today, the profits and proceeds are given to various charities.

The members of the New School committee that edited and translated the book were John Chamberlain, Sidney B. Fay, John Gunther, Carlton J. H. Hayes, Graham Hutton, Alvin Johnson, William L. Langer, Walter Millis, R. de Roussy de Sales, and George N. Shuster.

The book was translated from the two volumes of the first German edition (1925 and 1927), with annotations appended noting any changes made in later editions, which were deemed "not as extensive as popularly supposed". The translation was made with a view to readability rather than in an effort to rigidly reproduce Hitler's sometimes idiosyncratic German form. Significantly, the translation marked in the text areas that had been left out of the Dugdale abridgment.

The text was heavily annotated for an American audience with biographical and historical details derived largely from German sources. As the translators deemed the book "a propagandistic essay of a violent partisan", which "often warps historical truth and sometimes ignores it completely", the tone of many of these annotations reflected a conscious attempt to provide "factual information that constitutes an extensive critique of the original".

Apart from the editorial committee there was also a "sponsoring committee" of prominent individuals including Pearl S. Buck, Dorothy Canfield, Edna St. Vincent Millay, Ida Tarbell, Cyrus Adler, Charles A. Beard, Nicholas Murray Butler, Theodore Dreiser, Albert Einstein, Morris Ernst, Rev. Harry Emerson Fosdick, Rev. John Haynes Holmes, James M. Landis, Thomas Mann, Bishop William T. Manning, Eugene O'Neill, Theodore Roosevelt Jr., Mgr. John A. Ryan, Norman Thomas, Walter White, William Allen White and Rabbi Stephen S. Wise.

=== Stackpole translation and controversy ===
The Stackpole edition was translated and printed in a hurry between December 1938 and February 1939. The translator, Barrows Mussey, requested anonymity. On the eve of the publication of both translations on 28 February 1939, Stackpole had invested $21,000 in the project and had an initial print run of 15,000 copies. Also on that date Houghton Mifflin's motion for a temporary injunction against Stackpole publishing their edition was denied by Judge Alfred Conkling Coxe Jr. of the United States District Court for the Southern District of New York. Coxe reasoned that "The Defendants Stackpole have raised questions of title and validity which are not free from doubt; the facts are in dispute; and the issues cannot properly be determined on affidavit."

Houghton Mifflin appealed to the United States Court of Appeals for the Second Circuit, and for a few months both translations were available for sale to the public. The case was heard on 18 May 1939, before the judges Learned Hand, his cousin Augustus N. Hand and Charles Edward Clark. The judges went into conference on 24 May 1939, and came down with a decision granting the injunction against Stackpole on 9 June 1939. Stackpole then appealed for delay and rehearing, based on legal technicalities because only one copy of Mein Kampf had been deposited with the United States Copyright Office, according to Houghton Mifflin's Bill of Complaint. After this was denied later that June, Stackpole appealed to the United States Supreme Court. Until the Supreme Court granted certiorari, Stackpole was now enjoined from selling its translation of Mein Kampf and Houghton Mifflin exercised its copyright by securing injunctions against Mein Kampf: An Unexpurgated Digest and Mein Kampf: A New Unexpurgated Translation Condensed with Critical Comments and Explanatory Notes.

The Supreme Court denied Stackpole's petition for a writ of certiorari (that is, the Court declined to hear the appeal) on 23 October 1939, Felix Frankfurter recusing himself. Stackpole then tried further appeals, this time based on the original 1933 contract between Eher Press and Houghton Mifflin. The case again went to the Court of Appeals for the Second Circuit in May 1940, again before Learned Hand, now accompanied by Herbert B. Chase and Robert P. Patterson, who ruled in July that Houghton Mifflin did need to get authorization from Eher Verlag to prove their contract valid. However, Stackpole was still enjoined from selling its translation. Eher Verlag, who had not previously been involved in the case, gave a statement to a consular official in Munich in 1941, and the case was finally settled in District Court on 4 September 1941, when Houghton Mifflin was authorized to collect damages from Stackpole. $15,250 was paid by Telegraph Press, Stackpole's parent company, on 25 October 1941.

In its publicity campaign for the book, Stackpole set up a committee of prominent individuals who were to handle the funds that sales of the book would provide to refugee charities. This committee included: Harold Lasswell, Wesley C. Mitchell, George Gordon Battle, Reinhold Niebuhr, Horace Kallen, Ernest Meyer, Max Eastman, Vida Scudder, Louis Hacker, Bernson Y. Landis, Allen Heely, Milton Winternitz and Edward Smith Parons.

During the short period it was in print from 28 February – 9 June 1939, Stackpole had sold 12,000 copies of its translation. No records show whether any profits were ever turned over to any charity. The translation remains a rare and valuable artifact. WorldCat lists 133 copies worldwide.

The case set a legal precedent in US copyright law, as it established that stateless individuals have the same copyright status as other foreigners, a point not addressed in the Copyright Act of 1909 or in previous litigation.

=== Manheim translation ===
The Reynal and Hitchcock translation went out of print in 1942. No reason was given, but it was speculated that it was because Houghton Mifflin did not want to share profits with Reynal and Hitchcock, as well as a desire to produce a cheaper, less bulky version, without the elaborate notes and commentary that the Reynal and Hitchcock translation had. In 1943 Houghton Mifflin published their own edition, translated by Ralph Manheim, which they still publish.

The plates of the James Murphy translation having been destroyed by the Blitz, Hurst & Blackett decided to issue the Manheim translation in the United Kingdom when they decided to produce a new edition in 1965. The decision to issue a new edition at all ran into opposition from the Board of Deputies of British Jews and the West German government. Nevertheless, Hurst & Blackett still possessed the copyright for the British and Commonwealth market. The new edition was finally published in Britain in an intentionally expensive hardcover edition in 1969. A soft-cover 1972 edition at £1.95 was also controversial, as it was seen as a betrayal of the original decision to keep the book from wide distribution.

In the words of Burt A. Folkart of the Los Angeles Times, Manheim himself later argued that his translation was a “troubled effort because Hitler’s style and mixed metaphors had to be rendered into simple English.”

== Excerpts ==
In its efforts to counteract the influence of Dugdale's Mein Kampf abridgement, the American Jewish Committee drew up a mimeograph of quotations which showed that Hitler "attacked not only the Jews but the liberal institutions that are the basis of the government of the United States and in which he glorified war and the militaristic spirit. As these were not part of the abridged edition, copies of this mimeograph were sent to book reviews across the country."

The first excerpts from Mein Kampf to be published in English were selections from the Dugdale abridgement in the London Times in July 1933. These were published on 24, 25, 27 and 28 July. Feeling that these extracts gave a too favorable impression of their author and his intentions, Chaim Weizmann composed a 28-page translation of selected extracts from the first German edition which he sent to the Times and to the British Foreign Office. Most of these were "semi-obscene allegations against the Jews", but others were on foreign policy and the role of education under Nazism.

A series of pamphlets published by the Friends of Europe included four which consisted of excerpts from Mein Kampf. The first dealt with biographical information, and the other three contained quotations on race, religion and foreign policy. The latter pamphlet was originally "extracted and translated" by Rennie Smith, however, the pamphlet's "guiding spirit" quickly became the Duchess of Atholl. She contacted the Foreign Office and was given the excerpts that had been prepared by Weizmann. Further inquiries from her convinced the British foreign ministry to compose an in-house translation of some of the passages. The 11-page document, Central Germany, 7 May 1936 – Confidential – A Translation of Some of the More Important Passages of Hitler's Mein Kampf (1925 edition), was circulated among the British diplomatic corps, and a private copy was also sent to the Duchess of Atholl, who may or may not have used it in what was ultimately her translation of Mein Kampf in the Friends of Europe pamphlet.

In 1939, two further pamphlets containing excerpts from Mein Kampf were published. One of these, Mein Kampf: A New Unexpurgated Translation Condensed with Critical Comments and Explanatory Notes, was published by a start up firm based in Greenwich, Connecticut, called Noram Publishing Company, which had been created for the sole purpose of publishing parts of Mein Kampf that were not available in the Dugdale abridgement. It was formed by the reporter Alan Cranston (later a Senator) and his friend Amster Spiro, a Jewish reporter with the Hearst syndicate. While dictating the translation to secretaries in Manhattan, one of the transcribers who happened to be Jewish became alarmed at the contents and contacted the Anti-Defamation League, who sent Benjamin Epstein to investigate. When Epstein learned that the publication was meant to alert the American people to the danger Hitler presented, Epstein decided to collaborate with Spiro and Cranston. "Once I realized he was really on our side ... I opened our files and we worked very closely together", he was later quoted as saying.

This pamphlet was published in a 32-page tabloid edition with notes, maps and illustrations. The cover stated that not one cent of royalties would be paid to Hitler, and the profits would supposedly go to refugees. Cranston claimed that they sold half a million copies in 10 days at 10 cents each. However, Houghton Mifflin secured an injunction against Noram from the Federal District Court and they had to pulp their remaining stock of 500,000.

Finally, there is Mein Kampf: An Unexpurgated Digest. Relatively little is known of this edition or its editor and translator, B.D. Shaw. He explains in his preface that he was concerned about Germany's expansionism in the late 1930s and wished to alert the public to the dangers Hitler presented, but which were not shown in the abridged edition of his book. Like the Cranston pamphlet it cost 10 cents and it had 31 pages.

== Reception and readership ==
The British edition of the abridgement was reviewed by The Times, Times Literary Supplement, Birmingham Gazette, Birmingham Post, Daily Express, Daily Herald, Daily Mail, Daily Sketch, Daily Telegraph, Evening News, Evening Standard, Everyman, Irish Independent, Leeds Mercury, Liverpool Post, Listener, Manchester Guardian, Morning Post, New Britain, News Chronicle, Northern Echo, Nottingham Guardian, The Observer, Oxford Times, Public Opinion, Punch, Reynold's News, The Scotsman, The Spectator, Star, Sunday Dispatch, Time and Tide, Western Morning News, Yorkshire Herald and the Yorkshire Post.

Publication of the Dugdale abridgement was actively opposed by Jewish organizations in the United States. Prominent stock broker Louis Lober and others petitioned the New York City Board of Education to cease buying textbooks from Houghton Mifflin, in retaliation for publishing the book. Department store owner Louis Kirstein, industrialist Max Conn, the Chicago Israelite and lawyer Samuel Untermyer also urged that it not be published.

In the United States the book was reviewed by the New York Times twice – once on its day of publication, 11 October 1933, by John Chamberlain and two days later by former American ambassador to Germany James W. Gerard. Other reviews were made in the New York Herald Tribune, New York World-Telegram, Saturday Review of Literature, American Mercury, Christian Science Monitor, Baltimore Sun, Dallas Times Herald, North American Review, Chicago Daily News, St. Louis Globe-Democrat, Louisville Courier-Journal, Los Angeles Times, Milwaukee Journal, Cleveland Plain-Dealer, Kansas City Star and Springfield Sunday Union and Republican. It was also reviewed in The Nation by Ludwig Lore who would go on to write the introduction for the Stackpole edition.

There is no firm evidence that Stanley Baldwin or Neville Chamberlain ever read the abridgement, but Franklin D. Roosevelt had one in his library in which was annotated: "The White House – 1933 This translation is so expurgated as to give a wholly false view of what Hitler is and says – the German original would make a different story." He had been sent a complimentary copy by the publishers.

It is known that Chamberlain read the above-mentioned extracts circulated in the Foreign Office by Anthony Eden. When the unabridged translation was published, Chamberlain immediately bought a copy and annotated it. The Murphy translation was also reviewed in The Times, The Spectator, The Daily Telegraph, The Observer, Times Literary Supplement and Evening News. Reviews were mostly positive about the translation itself, but felt that Murphy's introduction was too favorable to the author.

In January 1939, the National Book Club published a new English edition of Mein Kampf, for which Arthur Bryant wrote a foreword praising Hitler (with reservations: he denounced Nazi persecution of Jews) and comparing him to Benjamin Disraeli.

== See also ==
- Contemporary imprints of The Protocols of the Elders of Zion
- Jewish conspiracy theories
- Mein Kampf in Arabic
