= Battle of Lwów (1939) =

Battle for control of the Polish city of Lwów

Coordinates: 49°50′33″N 24°01′56″E

- Part of the German and Soviet invasion of Poland
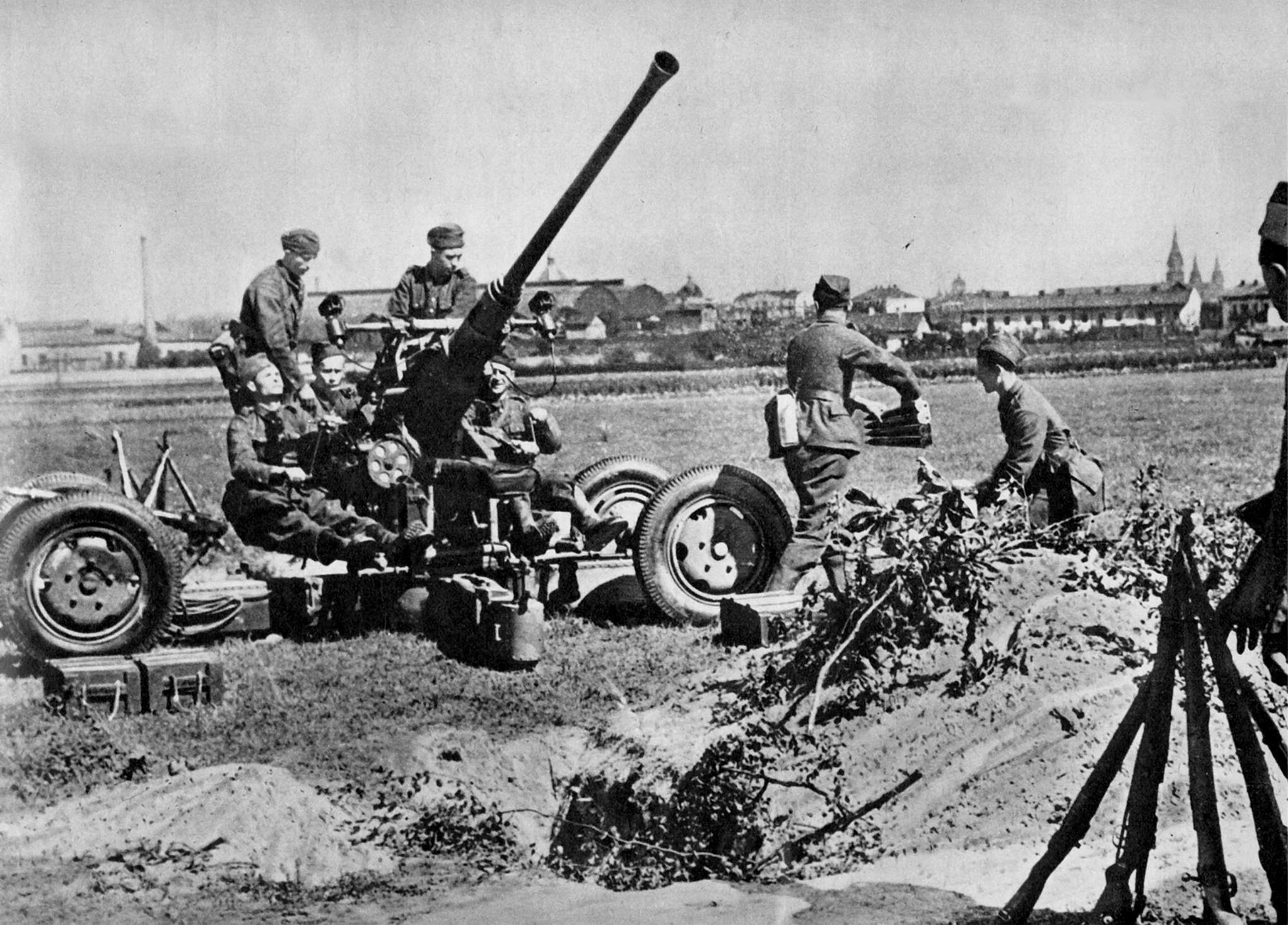
- Polish Anti-aircraft Bofors 40 mm Lwów 1939
Date	September 12–22, 1939
Location	Lwów, Lwów Voivodeship, Poland
Result	German–Soviet victory

Belligerents
Germany; Soviet Union (after 19 September)	Poland

Commanders and leaders
(Nazi Germany) Ferdinand Schörner (Soviet Union) Filipp Golikov	Władysław Langner; Franciszek Sikorski; Stanisław Maczek

Units involved
(Nazi Germany) 14th Army (Soviet Union) 6th Army	(Second Polish Republic) Southern Front

Strength
(Nazi Germany) German: 2 Mountain Divisions; 1 Infantry Division (Soviet Union) Soviet: 2 Cavalry Divisions; 1 Light Tank Brigade; 1 Tank Brigade	11 infantry battalions 5 batteries of artillery (mainly 75 mm guns); 2 armoured trains 1 cavalry unit 1 engineering platoon and a small number of soldiers who retreated into the city

Casualties and losses
(Nazi Germany) German 1st Mountain Division: 484 killed (including 116 from Gebirgsjäger-Regiment 99.); 918 wounded 608 sick (Soviet Union) Soviet: 24th Armoured Brigade: 4 KIA and 8 WIA on 22 September Total: 488+ killed 926+ wounded 608+ sick	Unknown

The Battle of Lwów (sometimes called the Siege of Lwów) was a World War II battle for the control over the formerly Polish city of Lwów (now Lviv, Ukraine) between the Polish Army and the invading Wehrmacht and the Red Army. The city was seen as the key to the so-called Romanian Bridgehead and was defended at all costs.

== First clashes ==
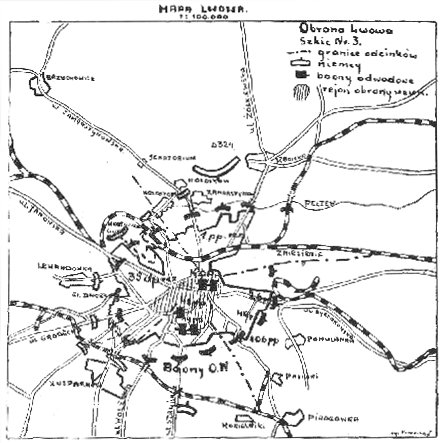
Sketch showing the Polish defences around September 13

Initially, the city was not to be defended, as it was considered to be too deep behind the Polish lines and too important to Polish culture for warfare. However, the speed of the Nazi invasion and the almost-complete disintegration of the Polish reserve Prusy Army after the Battle of Łódź resulted in the city being in danger of a German assault. On September 7, 1939, General Władysław Langner started to organise the defence of the city. Initially, the Polish forces were to defend the Bełżec – Rawa Ruska – Magierów line against the advancing German forces. General Rudolf Prich was given command of the Polish forces in the area, and on September 11, he prepared a plan to defend of the area. The Polish units were to defend the line of the San River, with nests of resistance along the Żółkiew – Rawa Ruska – Janów to the west of the Wereszyca River – Gródek Jagielloński line.

The following day, the first German motorised units under Colonel Ferdinand Schörner, 1st Mountain Division (Wehrmacht), arrived in the area. After capturing Sambor (66 kilometres from Lwów), Schörner ordered his units to break through the weak Polish defences and to capture the city as soon as possible. The assault group was composed of two motorised infantry companies and a battery of 150 mm guns. The group outflanked the Polish defenders and reached the outskirts of the city but was bloodily repelled by the numerically-inferior Polish defenders. The Polish commander of the sector had only three infantry platoons and two 75 mm guns, but his forces were soon reinforced and held their positions until dawn. The same day, the command of the city's defence was passed to General Franciszek Sikorski, a veteran of World War I and the Polish–Soviet War.

The following day, the main forces of Schörner arrived, and at 14:00, the Germans broke into the city centre but again were driven back after heavy city fighting with the infantry units formed of local volunteers and refugees. To strengthen the Polish defences, General Kazimierz Sosnkowski left Lwów for Przemyśl on September 13 and assumed command over a group of Polish units that was trying to break through the German lines and to reinforce the city.

Schörner decided to fall back and to encircle the city while he awaited reinforcements. His forces achieved a limited success and captured the important suburb of Zboiska, together with the surrounding hills. However, the Polish forces were now reinforced with units that had been withdrawn from central Poland and new volunteer units formed within the city. In addition, the Polish 10th Motorised Brigade, under Colonel Stanisław Maczek, arrived and started the heavy fighting to take back the suburb of Zboiska. The town was recaptured, but the surrounding hills remained in German hands and gave a good view of the city centre. Schörner placed his artillery there to shell the city. In addition, the city was almost constantly bombed by the Luftwaffe. Among the main targets for the German air force and artillery were prominent buildings, such as churches, hospitals, water plant and power plants.

== New enemy ==
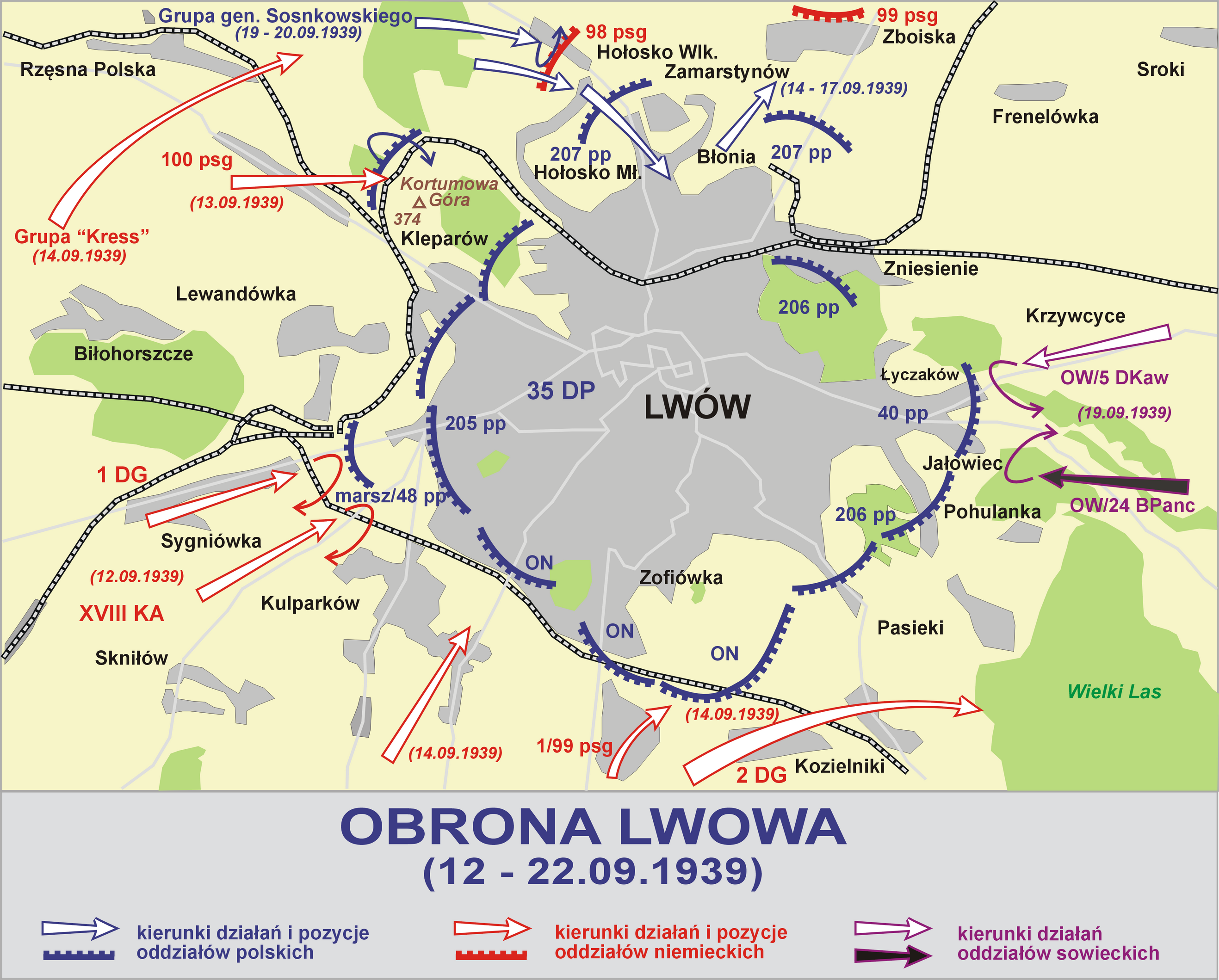
Map of the battle.

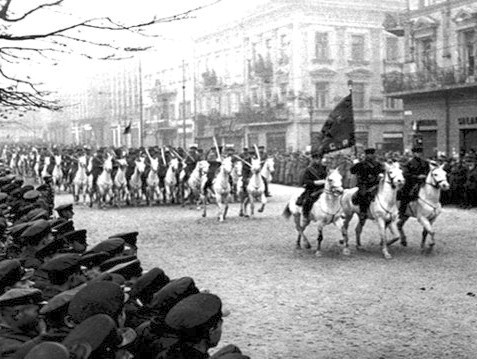
Soviet cavalry parade after the capitulation of Lwów

On September 17, 1939, the Soviet Union declared all pacts with Poland null and void as the Polish state had ceased to exist, and the Soviets joined Nazi Germany in the occupation of Poland. The forces of the 6th Red Army of the Ukrainian Front, under Filipp Golikov, crossed the border just east of Lwów and started a quick march towards the city. The Soviet invasion made all plans to defend the Romanian Bridgehead obsolete, and the Polish commander decided to withdraw all of his units to the close perimeter and to defend only the city itself, instead of the whole area, which strengthened the Polish defences. On September 18, the Luftwaffe dropped thousands of leaflets over the city to urge the Poles to surrender but was ignored. A general assault was started on the city, which was once again repulsed.

The intervention of the Red Army on 17 September also made necessary some changes in the Germans' plan of operations.

In the early morning of September 19, the first Soviet armoured units reached the eastern outskirts of the city and the suburb of Łyczaków. After a short fight, the Soviet units were pushed back. However, the Soviet forces completed the encirclement of the city overnight and linked with the German army besieging Lwów from the west.

The Polish defences were composed mainly of field fortifications and barricades constructed by the local residents under supervision of military engineers. Sikorski ordered organised defence of the outer city rim, with in-depth defences prepared. In the morning of September 19, the first Soviet envoys arrived and began negotiations with the Polish officers. Colonel Ivanov, the commander of a tank brigade, told Colonel Bronisław Rakowski that the Red Army entered Poland to help it fight the Germans and that the top priority for his units was to enter the city.

The same day, Schörner sent his envoy and demanded the city be surrendered to his troops. When the Polish envoy replied that he had no intention of signing such a document, he was informed that a general assault was ordered for September 21 and that the city would most surely be taken. Hitler's evacuation order from September 20 instructed Gerd von Rundstedt to leave the capture of Lwow to the Soviets. The attack planned by XVIII Corps for 21 September was cancelled, and the German corps prepared to move to the west of the Vistula-San River line. The following day, Sikorski decided that the situation of his forces was hopeless. The reserves, human resources and materiel were plentiful, but further defence of the city would be fruitless and result only in more civilian casualties. He decided to start surrender talks with the Red Army.

== Surrender ==
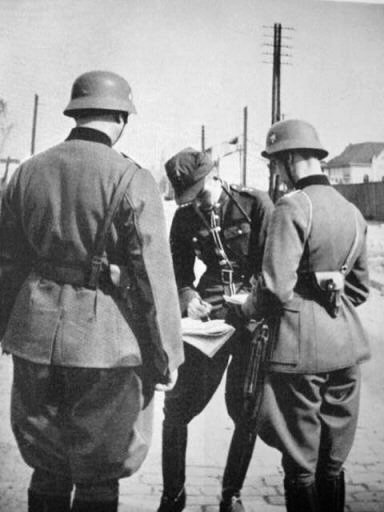
Polish and German representatives discuss terms of surrender.

On September 22, 1939, the act of surrender was signed in the suburb of Winniki in the morning. The Red Army accepted all of the conditions proposed by General Władysław Langner. The privates and NCOs were to leave the city, register themselves at the Soviet authorities and be allowed to go home. Officers would be allowed to keep their belongings and leave Poland for whichever country accepted them.

The Soviet forces entered the city, and the Soviet occupation began. The Soviets broke the terms of surrender shortly after noon when the NKVD began arresting all Polish officers. They were escorted to Tarnopol, where they were sent to various gulags in the Soviet Union, mostly to the infamous camp in Starobielsk, Ukraine. Most of them, including General Franciszek Sikorski himself, would be murdered in what became known as the Katyn Massacre in 1940.

== Order of battle ==
The Polish defences lacked organisation and consisted only of token forces. Sikorski had approximately 11 infantry battalions, 5 batteries of artillery (mainly 75 mm guns), cavalry unit, engineering platoon and a small number of soldiers who had retreated into the city. On 18 September, two armoured trains (No.53 and No.55, with two 100 mm howitzers and four 75 mm guns in total) broke into the city from Kovel and took part in further actions.

The German units consisted of an entire 1st Mountain Division.

=== Polish ===
Polish Army
	Division or Brigade	Regiments
Southern Front Sosnkowski	35th Infantry Division; Szafran	205th Infantry Regiment; 206th Infantry Regiment; 207th Infantry Regiment
Southern Front Sosnkowski	10th Motorized Cavalry Brigade; Maczek	10th Mounted Rifle Regiment; 24th Uhlans Regiment
Southern Front Sosnkowski	11th Infantry Division; Prugar-Ketling	48th Rifle Regiment; 49th Rifle Regiment; 53rd Rifle Regiment
Southern Front Sosnkowski	24th Infantry Division; Schwarzenberg-Czerny	17th Infantry Regiment; 38th Infantry Regiment; 39th Infantry Regiment
Southern Front Sosnkowski	38th Infantry Division; Wir-Konas	96th Infantry Regiment; 97th Infantry Regiment; 98th Infantry Regiment

=== German ===
Wehrmacht
	Corps	Division or Brigade	Regiments
14th Army List	XVIII Corps Eugen Beyer	1st Mountain Division; Ludwig Kübler	98th Jäger Regiment; 99th Jäger Regiment; 100th Jäger Regiment
14th Army List	XVIII Corps Eugen Beyer	2nd Mountain Division; Valentin Feurstein	136th Jäger Regiment; 137th Jäger Regiment; 130rd Jäger Regiment
14th Army List	XVII Corps Werner Kienitz	7th Infantry Division; Eugen Ott	19th Infantry Regiment; 61st Infantry Regiment; 62nd Infantry Regiment

=== Soviet ===
Soviet Army
	Corps	Division or Brigade	Regiments or Battalions
6th Army Golikov	2nd Cavalry Corps Kostenko	3rd Cavalry Division; Kotovsky	34th Cavalry Regiment; 60th Cavalry Regiment; 99th Cavalry Regiment; 158th Cavalry Regiment; 44th Tank Regiment
6th Army Golikov	2nd Cavalry Corps Kostenko	5th Cavalry Division; Blinov	11th Cavalry Regiment; 96th Cavalry Regiment; 131 Cavalry Regiment; 160th Cavalry Regiment; 32nd Tank Regiment
6th Army Golikov	2nd Cavalry Corps Kostenko	24th Light Tank Brigade; Fotchenkov	101st Independent Tank Battalion; 102nd Independent Tank Battalion; 106th Independent Tank Battalion; 117th Independent Tank Battalion
6th Army Golikov	17th Rifle Corps Kolganov	10th Tank Brigade; Ivanov	51st Independent Tank Battalion; 54th Independent Tank Battalion; 57th Independent Tank Battalion; 62nd Independent Tank Battalion

== Eyewitness account ==
From Lemberg to Bordeaux (Von Lemberg bis Bordeaux), written by Leo Leixner, a journalist and war correspondent, is a firsthand account of the battles that led to the fall of Poland, the Low Countries and France It includes an eyewitness description of the Battle of Lwów. In August 1939, Leixner had joined the Wehrmacht as a war reporter and was later promoted to sergeant, and in 1941, he published his recollections. The book was originally issued by Franz Eher Nachfolger, the central publishing house of the Nazi Party.

== See also ==
- Lwów Eaglets
- Molotov–Ribbentrop Pact
- List of World War II military equipment of Poland
- List of German military equipment of World War II
- List of Soviet Union military equipment of World War II
