= James Vincent Murphy =

Irish translator, writer, lecturer and journalist

- Born: 7 July 1880; Innishannon (Knockavilla)
- Died: 5 July 1946 (aged 65); Bishop's Stortford
- Education: St Patrick's College, Maynooth
- Occupations: Translator, writer, journalist
- Spouse: Mary Murphy
- Writing career
- Notable work: Translation of Mein Kampf

James Vincent Murphy (7 July 1880 – 4 July 1946) was an Irish translator, writer, lecturer and journalist, who published one of the first complete English translations of Mein Kampf in 1939.

Murphy attended St Patrick's College, Maynooth. He was ordained a priest at St Patrick's College Chapel in Maynooth, in 1905. He left clerical service, and by the late 1920s was married and working as a journalist. Before the Second World War he lived for some time in Italy and Germany.

== Early life ==
James Murphy was born in 1880 in Knockmacool, south of Murragh near Enniskean, County Cork, Ireland, to Timothy Murphy and his wife Hannah (née Sullivan). He was the third child in the family of three boys and four girls. In 1884 they moved to Raheen, Upton, northeast of Bandon, County Cork, where his father raised horses. As the cleverest son in the family custom dictated that he should become a Roman Catholic priest, so aged 13 he was sent to the diocesan school in Cork. In August 1894, his father, returning from the Bandon horse fair, fell from his horse and died of a fractured skull. James felt responsible as he had failed to check that the horse's saddle-girth strap had been tightened. He was under pressure to do well and was one of the few boys from the 27 diocesan schools in Ireland to gain admission to the Royal College of St Patrick at Maynooth, where he won several prizes and graduated in 1905 as a Bachelor of Divinity.

After a year's apprenticeship with the Bishop of Cork, he was sent to America to train in Saint Bernard's Seminary, Rochester, New York, where from autumn 1906 he taught rhetoric, but although regarded as a man of the highest talent, he was dismissed in April 1907 for negligence in discharging his duties. He was given a temporary post in the diocese of Rhode Island, followed by an appointment as curate at St Anthony's Church in Providence, Rhode Island. The parish flourished, increasing communicants to over 1,000. However, following a visit by the Bishop, who talked to Murphy about his unsatisfactory conduct, he left Providence in early November 1909 and then for Italy to start a new life. He was quite unsuited for the discipline of the priesthood and never discussed this period of his life – in fact, very few people knew he had ever been a priest.

== Italy and Paris ==
He studied Archaeology and Philosophy in Rome and Florence and later went to Germany, where he took courses at Heidelberg and Munich Universities. He was in Munich in 1914 when war broke out, but managed to escape and reach London. By this time he was viewed by the church as “a clerical drop-out”. His far greater interest in international affairs was recognised by the Northcliffe Press which, after Italy entered the war in 1915, sent him as a correspondent on the Austro-Italian front. In 1916 the Italian government appointed him head of the Italian Information Bureau in London. With the assistance of an Italian journalist he published a weekly English language magazine called Modern Italy. The idea was to make Italy better known to the British public, but its underlying purpose was to counter claims of self-determination by the Austrians, Croats and Slovenes. It ceased publication in September 1919, after the Versailles Peace Conference. Murphy's employment by the Italian government also terminated. In March 1919, Queen Mary had invited him to Buckingham Palace to lecture on behalf of the Italian orthopaedic surgeon Vittorio Putti, who had developed a technique for attaching artificial limbs.

Shortly after Mussolini's “March on Rome” in autumn 1922, Murphy went to Italy as a freelance correspondent for several British and American newspapers and magazines. He interviewed Mussolini several times and his reporting became critical of the Fascist regime, particularly after the murder of the Socialist Party leader Giacomo Matteotti in 1924. As a result, he became a victim of official harassment. His cables were read and sub-edited and his mail intercepted, with cheques being stolen. In short, he was made persona non grata. He left Italy for Paris and met up with a group of Italian political exiles. Among these was Mussolini's former private secretary Arturo Fasciolo, who provided him with documentary evidence of Mussolini's role in many illegal and criminal actions, including Matteotti's murder. He gave some of these documents to Gaetano Salvemini, who used them in his book The Fascist Dictatorship in Italy, published in 1927. Murphy's article on “Italian Tyranny”, published in the Atlantic Monthly in 1925, so impressed a US Congressman that he had it read in Congress and then reprinted in the Congressional Record. The former Premier Francesco Saverio Nitti persuaded Murphy to undertake a lecture tour in the US, to explain what was happening in Italy.

== American lecture tour, marriage and Germany ==
In 1927 Murphy moved to London to prepare his lectures for the American tour. He planned to include talks on European industrialisation and the need for economic unification, Anglo-Irish literature and Italian Fascism. There he met Mary Crowley, who helped him in his preparatory work, while he became interested in her poetry writing. The Italian government made an official diplomatic objection to Murphy's intended lecture tour, claiming that its purpose was to make public propaganda against the Italian government. On arrival in New York in October 1927 he was challenged by the US Immigration Service on his status as a visitor. He was allowed entry but he and his lecture agent, with the help of Philadelphia University, had to persuade the authorities of his academic credentials. His projected six-month US tour was so successful that it stretched to almost two years. He then persuaded the editor of the prestigious New York magazine The Forum to appoint him as its foreign editor.

On his return to London he planned a series of articles for The Forum on modern Irish literature and went to Dublin to interview George William Russell (who wrote with the pseudonym Æ). In London he had interviews with James Stephens and Seán O'Casey, whose controversial play The Silver Tassie was playing there. He and Mary married in London on 16 November 1929 and moved to Berlin a few days later as he had an appointment to interview Albert Einstein. Further meetings with Einstein followed, which led to Murphy meeting the Nobel Prize winning physicist Max Planck, the founder of the quantum theory. Planck and Einstein agreed to collaborate in the publication in Germany of an English-language intellectual journal, to be called The International Forum, aimed to bring together the pioneering minds of sociological science in Germany with those in America and Britain. Murphy solicited articles or wrote them himself based on interviews with, among others, Arnold Zweig, Erwin Schrödinger, Max Planck, Thomas Mann and Karl Haushofer. The first two issues, in January and February 1931, drew widespread attention, to the extent that the German Ministry of Education took over the financial responsibility for all the journal's business details. But after two more issues, the financial crisis in Germany caused the government to withdraw its subsidy, which led to the end of The International Forum. Murphy then devoted his time to the translation of scientific work, particularly Max Planck's lectures, which he edited and published in 1932 as Where is science going? with a preface by Einstein and an explanatory introduction by Murphy. The book was reprinted in 2001, 2019 and 2021, with tributes to Planck and comments on how relevant it still was, in spite of the huge advances in the application of physical science since its original publication.

== England and return to Germany ==
During 1932 the political climate and economic situation in Germany deteriorated, so Murphy decided to return to England. He translated Emil Ludwig's Leaders of Europe, which was published in both London and New York, and then wrote a short book Adolf Hitler: The drama of his career which sought to explain why Hitler had come into power. Most reviewers depicted it as soft on Nazism, but the Times Literary Supplement commented that it was "eminently readable and well-informed, serves as a wholesome corrective of some of the merely denunciatory generalisations about Herr Hitler and his movement." An unexpected result was that Murphy received an invitation from the Reich Ministry of Public Enlightenment and Propaganda to work for them as a translator and advisor. He was more attracted by the opportunity to help inaugurate a new English-language journal Research and Progress, designed to interest foreigners in scientific and cultural topics. He returned to Berlin in the summer of 1934.

He met Rudolf Hess and translated a speech he had made to war veterans. This appeared in a pamphlet entitled “Germany and Peace”, sent to numerous organisations overseas. The excellence of his translation led to Murphy being appointed official translator of Hitler's (and later other Nazi officials’) speeches into English. He engaged a highly intelligent German woman, Greta Lorke, to help him. After the war it became known that she, and her husband Adam Kuckhoff (executed in 1943), were members of the Soviet spy ring Rote Kapelle and that she secretly radioed advance copies of the texts of the speeches to Moscow.

Murphy was then asked by the Ministry of Propaganda to translate Hitler's Mein Kampf. A highly expurgated English version, of which Murphy was very critical, had been published in 1933. Murphy completed his unabridged translation in 1937, but by then he had fallen foul of the Nazi regime and the Ministry of Propaganda ceased his employment.

== Publication of unabridged translation of Mein Kampf ==
Murphy left Berlin in September 1938 during the Czech crisis without his Mein Kampf translation. All copies had been sequestered as Hitler had decided he did not want an unabridged English version published after all. However, Heinemann were keen to publish the full text provided they had official authorisation. Murphy prepared to leave for Berlin, but then received a warning not to come. The German Embassy confirmed that he would be unwelcome. So his wife, Mary, said she would go in his stead as, "They won't notice me." Her appointment at the Ministry of Propaganda on 10 November proved to be an inauspicious one as it was on the morning after Kristallnacht when, in an organised onslaught, Jewish-owned shops and synagogues all over Germany were smashed. She urged Horst Seyferth, the official she met and knew well, to give her a carbon copy of Murphy's translation of Mein Kampf. He blanched, "Do you think I want to be put up against a wall and shot? I have a wife and two daughters." To which Mary replied, "Of course you won't be shot. Besides, you can't prevent the book coming out in English eventually. Some Americans are preparing a translation right now. You know that my husband’s version is an accurate and faithful rendering of the text." Her arguments proved unavailing, so she suggested that the Propaganda Ministry merely issue a statement to the effect that Murphy had been officially commissioned to undertake the translation. Seyferth said “no” to everything. Mary left feeling disconsolate. She then remembered that she had given a handwritten draft to her husband's English typist and visited her that evening; she still had it and so gave it to Mary, who brought it back to London.

In November the German publisher, Eher Verlag, made it clear that they would not allow publication of a complete translation, but that Hurst & Blackett was free to re-publish the 1933 abridged version. In December two American firms defied the German prohibition and announced their intention to publish complete versions. Hurst & Blackett then decided to go ahead with the Murphy translation; it came out on 20 March 1939. The Times newspaper commented, “The translator has made an excellent job of 570 difficult pages, and his straightening out of the more involved sentences and jargon is masterly”. In May Eher Verlag enquired about receipt of royalties. They were told that royalties would only be paid after six months in print. By then the war had broken out and copyright relations severed. Eher Verlag also wrote, in a letter which Mary Murphy had to translate, a diatribe castigating James Murphy for his alleged unreliability, and saying that he had been paid a salary for his work. Hurst & Blackett used this, plus the failure to obtain the copyright, to cease royalty payments to him. The book became a best seller, with up to 200,000 copies sold before the printing plates were destroyed during a German bombing raid in 1942. Murphy's translation had also been serialised in 18 parts by the British Red Cross, which raised money through royalties. The Red Cross described Mein Kampf as “the blueprint of German Imperialism ... the most widely discussed book of the modern world”.

Although the Murphy translation is available online, it has been superseded in public libraries and commercial outlets by Ralph Manheim's 1943 translation, both in Britain and America.

== Second World War and final illness ==
During the war Murphy was in demand for articles and lectures on Germany and Italy. He had nearly one hundred articles published, as well as a pamphlet entitled “Who sent Rudolf Hess?” He gave numerous lectures, including an address to the Royal Institute of International Affairs at Chatham House on “The Nazi Propaganda Machine”, but he concentrated on writing a book he had planned over many years on the economic origins of the Second World War. The opening chapters were, in essence, a blueprint for the European Economic Community. With encouragement from the publishers Putnam, Murphy completed fourteen chapters, but severe illness, including a heart attack and Parkinson's disease, prevented him from finishing the task. He died a disappointed man on 4 July 1946, three days short of his 66th birthday, in hospital in Bishop's Stortford, Hertfordshire. He had wanted to leave one creative piece of work behind him for the sake of his two sons. In an unpublished biography by his widow, Mary Murphy wrote, “James was a man of huge intellect and presence, full of dreams and optimism. He brought joy and help and intellectual stimulus to many, many people. One woman who knew him well said that anyone who married him would be very selfish, because he belonged to everyone”.

== Works ==
- The International Forum. Monthly Journal for the exposition of German, American and British ideas. 1931 (4 editions released)
- (transl.) Max Planck, Where is science going?, 1932 (preface by Albert Einstein, Introduction by James Murphy)
- (transl.) Tex Harding, The Devil’s Drummer. 1934
- (transl.) Emil Ludwig, Leaders of Europe. Published in London and New York. 1934
- Adolf Hitler: the drama of his career, 1934
- (transl.) Erwin Schrödinger, Science and the human temperament, 1935, Allen & Unwin, (biographical introduction by James Murphy, foreword by Ernest Rutherford)
- (transl.) Emil Ludwig, Defender of Democracy: Masaryk of Czechoslovakia. Published New York 1936, London 1937
- (transl.) Adolf Hitler, Mein Kampf, 1939
- Who sent Rudolf Hess?, 1941
- (transl.) Samuel Igra, Germany’s National Vice. 1945
- Numerous articles in the magazines Atlantic Monthly, Nation, Forum, Harpers, Fortnightly Review, Edinburgh Review, Nineteenth Century, Contemporary Review, New Statesman and many British and American newspapers and other periodicals.
- The Commercial Background of the War or The Economic Background of the Peace (Unpublished).

== See also ==
- Edgar Dugdale
- Mein Kampf in English
