= Landis (disambiguation) =

Landis is a surname.

Landis may also refer to:

== Places ==
- Landis, North Carolina
- Landis, Saskatchewan
- Landis Mill Covered Bridge
- George Landis Arboretum
- Landis Valley Museum

== Companies ==
- Landis+Gyr, a Swiss corporation

== See also ==
- Landis' Missouri Battery
