= List of Nazi publishers =

This is an overview of publishers that mainly published National Socialist works until the end of the Second World War.

Name	Locations	Publicist	Period
Deutscher Volksverlag	Munich	Dr. Ernst Boepple	1919 - 1939
Franz Eher Nachfolger; Zentralverlag der NSDAP	Berlin, Munich, Vienna	Franz Eher, Max Amann	1920 - 1944
Hoheneichen Verlag	Munich		1919 - 1944
J. F. Lehmanns Verlag	Munich	Julius Friedrich Lehmann, Friedrich Schwartz	192? - 1944
Volk und Reich Verlag	Berlin, Amsterdam, Prague, Vienna		1930 - 1944
