= Operation Sea Lion order of battle =

The German plan for a land invasion of Britain in 1940 during World War II was code-named Operation Sea Lion (Unternehmen Seelöwe in German).

The forces that Germany had allocated per the modified German plan produced on August 30, 1940 are listed against the British forces in the United Kingdom at the time.

== German forces ==
=== Army Group A ===
Generalfeldmarschall Gerd von Rundstedt

- 16th Army — Generaloberst Ernst Busch

Embarking from Rotterdam and Calais, to land on a front from Folkestone to New Romney

First Wave

- XIII Army Corps — General Heinrich von Vietinghoff.
  - 17th Infantry Division
  - 35th Infantry Division
  - Luftwaffe II./14th Flak Regiment
- VII Army Corps — Generaloberst Eugen Ritter von Schobert
  - 1st Mountain Division
  - 7th Infantry Division
  - Luftwaffe I./26th Flak Regiment

Second Wave

- V Army Corps — General Richard Ruoff
  - 12th Infantry Division
  - 30th Infantry Division
- XXXXI Army Corps — General der Panzertruppen Georg-Hans Reinhardt
  - 8th Panzer Division
  - 10th Panzer Division
  - 29th Infantry Division (motorised)
  - Infantry Regiment Großdeutschland (motorised)
  - Infantry Regiment Leibstandarte SS Adolf Hitler - motorised Waffen-SS unit

Third Wave

- IV Army Corps — General Viktor von Schwedler
  - 24th Infantry Division
  - 58th Infantry Division
- XXXXII Army Corps — General Walter Kuntze
  - 45th Infantry Division
  - 164th Infantry Division

9th Army — Generaloberst Adolf Strauss

Sailing from Picardy and Normandy, would land on left flank of 16th Army extending front to Brighton

First Wave

- XXXVIII Army Corps — General Erich von Manstein
  - 26th Infantry Division
  - 34th Infantry Division
- VIII Army Corps — General Walter Heitz
  - 6th Mountain Division
  - 8th Infantry Division
  - 28th Infantry Division

Second Wave

- XV Army Corps — Generaloberst Hermann Hoth
  - 4th Panzer Division
  - 7th Panzer Division
  - 20th Infantry Division (motorised)

Third Wave

- XXIV Army Corps General Leo Freiherr Geyr von Schweppenburg
  - 15th Infantry Division
  - 78th Infantry Division |

=== Army Group C ===
Generalfeldmarschall Wilhelm Ritter von Leeb

- 6th Army — Generalfeldmarschall Walther von Reichenau
- II Army Corps — General Walter Graf von Brockdorff-Ahlefeldt
  - 6th Infantry Division
  - 256th Infantry Division
- Airborne Formations — General Kurt Student
  - 7th Air Division
  - 22nd Infantry Division (Air Landing)
- 800th Special Duties Construction Training Regiment Brandenburg

In addition German forces in Norway, Netherlands and western France made preparations for landings between Edinburgh and Newcastle, between the Wash and Harwich, and between Wexford and Dungarvan in Ireland; these preparations were as part of feint and not intended as actual landings

== British forces ==
=== Home Forces ===
Commander-in-Chief, Home Forces: General Alan Brooke (Note: former commander of Southern Command, replacing Edmund Ironside in July 1940)
Chief of Staff: Lieutenant-General Bernard Paget

- 38th (Welsh) Infantry Division
- 21st Army Tank Brigade - HQ at Salisbury Plain , battalions were a mobile reserve for the coastal defence, although understrength in terms of tanks
- IV Corps — Lieutenant-General Francis Nosworthy
  - 2nd Armoured Division
  - 42nd (East Lancashire) Infantry Division
  - 31st Independent Infantry Brigade Group
- VII Corps — Lieutenant-General Andrew McNaughton (Canadian Army)
  - 1st Armoured Division
  - 1st Canadian Infantry Division
  - 1st Army Tank Brigade (infantry tanks)

Northern Command — Lieutenant-General Ronald Forbes Adam

Covering England from the Wash to Scottish border

- I Corps — Lieutenant-General Harold Alexander
  - 1st Infantry Division
  - 2nd Infantry Division
  - 45th Infantry Division
- X Corps — Lieutenant-General William Holmes
  - 54th (East Anglian) Infantry Division
  - 59th (Staffordshire) Infantry Division
- London District — Lieutenant-General Bertram Sergison-Brooke
  - 20th Independent Infantry Brigade (Guards)
  - 24th Guards Brigade Group
  - 3rd London Infantry Brigade

Eastern Command — Lieutenant-General Laurence Carr

Covering East Anglia to South East England

- II Corps — Lieutenant-General Edmund Osborne
  - 18th Infantry Division - Territorial Army division, covering East Anglia
  - 52nd (Lowland) Infantry Division - Territorial Army division
  - 37th Independent Infantry Brigade
- XI Corps — Lieutenant-General Hugh Massy
  - 15th (Scottish) Infantry Division
  - 55th (West Lancashire) Infantry Division
- XII Corps — Lieutenant-General Andrew Thorne
  - 1st London Infantry Division
  - 43rd (Wessex) Infantry Division
  - New Zealand Division
  - 1st Motor Machine Gun Brigade
  - 29th Independent Infantry Brigade

Southern Command — Lieutenant-General Claude Auchinleck

- V Corps — Lieutenant-General Bernard Montgomery
  - 3rd Infantry Division
  - 4th Infantry Division
  - 50th (Northumbrian) Infantry Division
- VIII Corps — Lieutenant-General Harold Franklyn
  - 48th (South Midland) Infantry Division
  - 70th Independent Infantry Brigade
- Australian force in the UK (later 9th Division) — Major General Henry Wynter
  - 18th Australian Infantry Brigade (Southern Command Striking Force)
  - 25th Australian Infantry Brigade

Western Command — General Robert Gordon-Finlayson

Based at Chester, covering Wales and western England to the Scottish border

- 2nd London Infantry Division
- III Corps — Lieutenant-General James Marshall-Cornwall
  - 5th Infantry Division
  - 3rd Motor Machine Gun Brigade
  - 36th Independent Infantry Brigade

Scottish Command — Lieutenant-General Harold Carrington

- 46th Infantry Division
- 51st (Highland) Infantry Division
