= Eugen Ritter von Schobert =

German general (1883-1941)

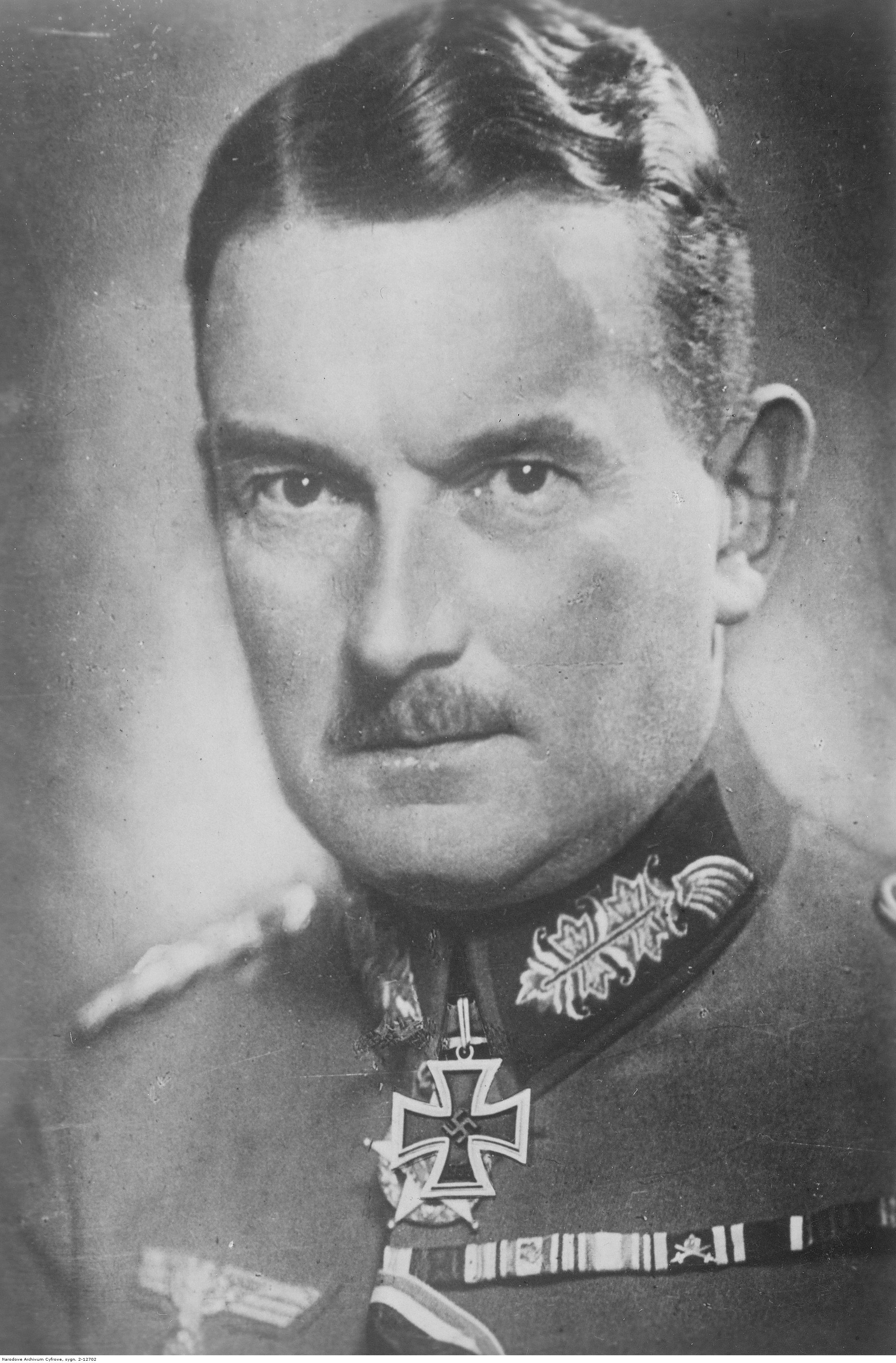
- Born: 13 March 1883; Würzburg, Kingdom of Bavaria, German Empire
- Died: 12 September 1941 (aged 58); Mykolaiv, Ukrainian SSR, Soviet Union
- Military career
- Allegiance: German Empire; Kingdom of Bavaria; Weimar Republic; Nazi Germany
- Branch: Imperial German Army; Bavarian Army; Reichswehr; Nazi Germany
- Service years: 1902–1941
- Rank: Generaloberst
- Commands: 17th Infantry Division; 33rd Infantry Division; VII Army Corps; 11th Army
- Conflicts: World War I; Battle of Verdun; German spring offensive of 1918; World War II; Invasion of Poland; Battle of France; Operation Barbarossa †
- Awards: Knight's Cross of the Iron Cross

Eugen Siegfried Erich Ritter von Schobert (13 March 1883 – 12 September 1941) was a German general during World War II. He commanded the 11th Army during Operation Barbarossa, the invasion of the Soviet Union. Schobert died when his observation plane crashed in a Soviet minefield.

== Early life ==
Schobert was born as Eugen Schobert in Würzburg in the Kingdom of Bavaria, a member state of the German Empire. He was the son of Major Karl Schobert and Anna née Michaely. Schobert entered the Royal Bavarian Army in July 1902. He served primarily in the 1st Bavarian Infantry Regiment "König" and underwent pilot training in 1911.

== World War I and post-war ==
During World War I, Schobert remained a Bavarian infantry officer, serving the entire war on the Western Front. During the German spring offensive of 1918, he led the 3rd Battalion of the 1st Bavarian Infantry Regiment. For his actions on 23 March 1918, when he personally and successfully led his battalion in the crossing of a canal near Jussy against stiff British resistance, he was awarded the Knight's Cross of the Military Order of Max Joseph. This was Bavaria's highest military honor, comparable to the Prussian Pour le Mérite, and conferred a patent of nobility on a recipient who was a commoner. Hence Eugen Schobert became Eugen Ritter von Schobert. (Note: Although his actions were in March 1918, the Military Max Joseph Order was not actually bestowed on Schobert until after the end of the war and the abdication of the Bavarian king. Therefore, technically his (and a number of other recipients') patent of nobility was only a change of name. The patent was non-hereditary, so his children did not inherit the title.)

After World War I, Schobert remained in the Reichswehr and then the Wehrmacht, steadily rising up the ranks. He was Inspector of Infantry from December 1933 to September 1934 and then commanded the 17th Infantry Division from 1935 to 1936 and the 33rd Infantry Division from 1936 to 1938. He took command of the VII Army Corps (VII. Armeekorps) on 4 February 1938.

== World War II and death ==
In September 1939, Schobert led his VII Army Corps in the invasion of Poland as part of the reserve of Army Group South. In May–June 1940, his corps, part of General Ernst Busch's Sixteenth Army of Army Group A, participated in the invasion of Belgium and Luxembourg and the Battle of France. He received the Knight's Cross of the Iron Cross for his leadership of the VII Corps in the breakthrough of the Maginot Line and the capture of Nancy and Toul. He remained in command of the corps during preparations for the intended invasion of Great Britain.

In September 1940, Schobert was given command of the Eleventh Army, which was assigned to Army Group South for Operation Barbarossa, the invasion of the Soviet Union. During combat operations in the southern Soviet Union, Schobert was killed when his Fieseler Storch observation aircraft crashed in a Soviet minefield. He was succeeded by Erich von Manstein. A German war correspondent, Leo Leixner, wrote Schobert's biography.

== Family ==
Schobert married Alice Rieder-Gollwitzer in 1921. They had three children: two sons and one daughter. His younger son was killed in combat in 1944 while serving as a fighter pilot for the Luftwaffe.

== Decorations ==
- Knight's Cross of the Iron Cross on 29 June 1940 as General der Infanterie and commanding general of the VII. Armeekorps

== Notes ==
Military offices
Preceded by none	Commander of 11. Armee; 5 October 1940 – 21 September 1941	Succeeded by Generalfeldmarschall Erich von Manstein
