= N.S.-Funk =

German Nazi radio magazine (1933–1939)

Issue 9, 1939 of N.S.-Funk, with Japanese singer Michiko Tanaka on the cover

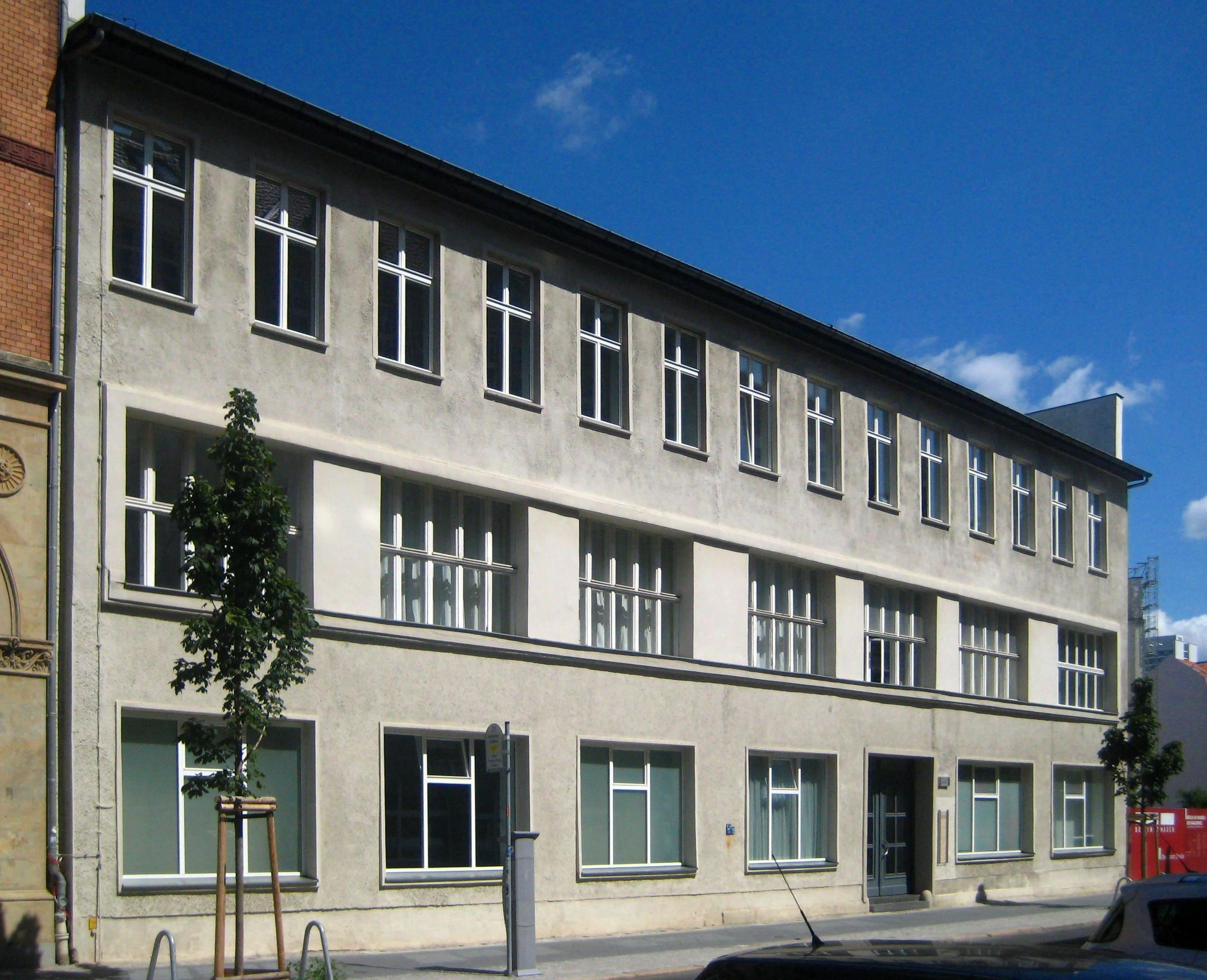
Zimmerstrasse 88, Berlin - where the editorial office of N.S.-Funk was located

N.S.-Funk ("National Socialist Radio") was a German magazine published from Munich and Berlin between 1933 and 1939. It provided listings of radio programming schedules and reviewed programmes in accordance with the party line.

== History ==
In 1932, the Nazi party leadership decided to start a radio magazine of its own to compete with the various existing radio magazines. The publication was founded in February 1933 as the first official Nazi radio magazine, tasked with providing listings of radio programming schedules in Germany and reviewing them in accordance with the party line. It replaced the radio magazine Der Deutsche Sender ('The German Broadcaster'), as the former Reich Association of German Broadcasters (RDR) was taken over by the Reich Broadcasting Chamber. It was published from Munich and Berlin until 1939, when it was merged into the magazine Volksfunk ('People's Radio').

N.S.-Funk was a central organ of the Nazi Party (NSDAP) and the Reich Broadcasting Chamber (a body within the Reich Chamber of Culture). It was published by Franz Eher Nachfolger, the central publishing body of the Nazi Party. It had an editorial branch office at Zimmerstrasse 88 in Berlin. Heinz Frante was the editor in chief of N.S.-Funk. Over time, N.S.-Funk grew in popularity, by early 1937 it reached a circulation of about a quarter million copies.

In contrast to other contemporary German radio magazines N.S.-Funk was published in various regional editions, covering each of the different broadcasting districts, such as Bavaria, Berlin, Silesia, East Prussia, Saar-Palatinate, Central Germany, Western Germany, Southwest Germany, North Germany and South Germany. It was an illustrated weekly.

During the prolonged Volkssender-Aktion propaganda campaign, each copy of N.S.-Funk would typically carry one or two pages dedicated to the announcements of the campaign. The publication Funktechnischer Vorwärts functioned as the radio technical edition of N.S.-Funk and Volksfunk.
