= Ich Kämpfe =

Nazi book for new members

- Author: Hermann Liese
- Language: German
- Publisher: Franz Eher Nachfolger GmbH
- Publication date: 1942
- Publication place: German Reich

Ich Kämpfe (English: "I Fight") was a book given by the Nazi Party to each new enrollee from 1942 until 1944. Nearly all copies of this book were destroyed at the end of the war under the Allied policy of denazification, with the result that originals are very rare.

== Contents ==
The text of Ich Kämpfe was written by leaders of the various paramilitary sections of the Nazi Party describing the alleged success of their movement. There are sections by Joseph Goebbels, Reichsleiters Phillip Bouhler, Alfred Rosenberg, Dr. Robert Ley, Professor Dr. Groß, and Artur Axmann.

The book includes information on the Schutzstaffel (SS), the Sturmabteilung (SA), National Socialist Flyers Corps (NSFK), National Socialist Women's League (NSF), National Socialist Motor Corps (NSKK), loyalty to the Führer, the program of the Nazi Party, the German Concept of Freedom, the National Socialist Revolution, Honor List of the Martyrs of the Movement, Our Will, the Responsibilities of Political Leaders, the National Socialist Way of Life, the Responsibility of Party Members, and the Dates in the History of the NSDAP.

== See also ==
- Mein Kampf – Hitler's autobiography up to 1926
