= Władysław Langner =

Polish general (1896–1972)

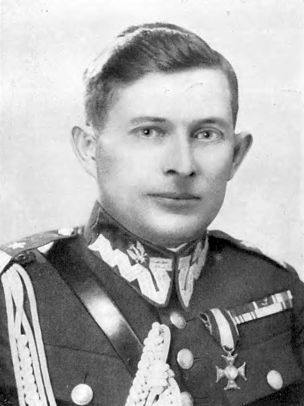
- Born: 18 June 1896; Jaworów near Lwów, Galicia
- Died: 28 September 1972 (aged 76) Newcastle upon Tyne, Great Britain
- Service years: 1914
- Rank: Brigadier General
- Awards: Virtuti Militari Golden Cross Virtuti Militari Silver Cross Polonia Restituta Officer's Cross Krzyz Zaslugi Krzyz Niepodleglosci Cross of the Valorous

Władysław Aleksander Langner (18 June 1896 – 28 September 1972) was a Polish general, best known as commander of the Siege of Lwów in 1939.

== Early career ==
Władysław Langner spent his childhood in the Polish town of Tarnów, where he became a member of a local Independent Youth Union, which he represented at a national congress in Kraków in 1913. In the same year he founded a paramilitary organization in Tarnów together with his brother, in which they regularly organized military exercises and training. Later this organization also engaged in recruiting to the Polish National Army.

In the years 1914-1917, he served in the I Brigade of Piłsudski's Polish Legions and became commander of an infantry platoon. In the following years he was commanding officer of, among others, the 5th Infantry Regiment, the 40th Infantry Regiment stationed in Lwów, and the 12th Infantry Division based in Tarnopol. In 1928, Władysław Langner was called to Warsaw, where he worked as Head of the Main Administration Bureau of the Ministry of War. After three years he was promoted to the second Vice Minister of War and Chief of Army Administration, and in 1934 he was promoted to General. Until 1938 he served as a CO of Łódź-based IV Corps Command. Later, until 1939, he served on the same post in the headquarters of the VI Corps Command in Lwów.

== World War II ==
During the Polish Defensive War of September 1939, Władysław Langner assumed command of all the Polish forces stationed in and around the city of Lwów. He commanded his forces during fights against the Wehrmacht and the Red Army, which later became known as the Battle of Lwów. Although his troops were badly outnumbered, the defense lasted ten days, after which General Langner surrendered the city to the Red Army so as to not endanger further the lives of the people and risk the destruction of the city.

After leaving the city, he managed to escape to Romania, and then to France, where he joined the reborn Polish Army being formed under the auspices of the Polish government in exile. After the fall of France, he retreated to the United Kingdom. There, he was appointed commander of the Polish 3rd Carpathian Rifle Brigade stationed in Scotland. In 1941, he gave up this post and between 1943 and the end of World War II he served as an Inspector of Military Training of Polish Units in Great Britain.

== Retirement ==
Władysław Langner retired to a farm in Wales. He died in Newcastle upon Tyne in 1972, and was buried at the All Saints Cemetery. The grave is also the symbolic grave of his wife Zofia (née Szymańska), who participated in the Warsaw Uprising of 1944 and was killed in it. The couple had son Ryszard Tomasz (1924-2020).

== Honours and awards ==
- Gold Cross of the Virtuti Militari, also the Silver Cross
- Cross of Independence
- Officer's Cross of the Order of Polonia Restituta
- Cross of Valour - four times
- Gold Cross of Merit

== See also ==
- Katyn Forest Massacre
- Soviet atrocities committed against prisoners of war during World War II
