= Mein Kampf =

1925 autobiography by Adolf Hitler

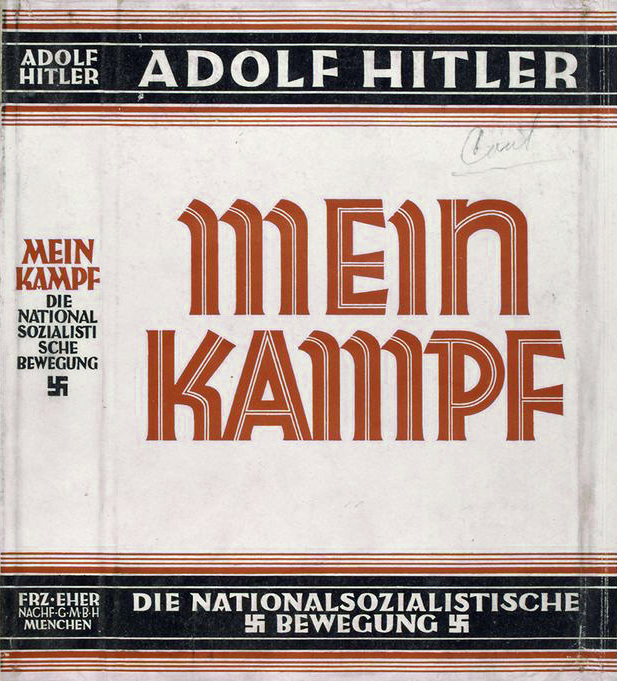
- 1926–1928 edition
- Author: Adolf Hitler
- Language: German
- Subject: Autobiography; Political manifesto Political philosophy
- Publisher: Franz Eher Nachfolger GmbH
- Publication date: 18 July 1925
- Publication place: German Reich
- English publication date: 13 October 1933 (abridged); 1939 (full)
- Media type: Print (hardcover and paperback)
- Pages: 720
- ISBN: 978-0395951057 (1998 trans. by Ralph Manheim)
- Dewey Decimal: 943.086092
- LC Class: DD247.H5
- Followed by: Zweites Buch
- Text: Mein Kampf at Wikisource

Mein Kampf (German: [maɪn ˈkampf]; lit. 'My Struggle') is a 1925 autobiographical and political manifesto by Adolf Hitler, the leader of the Nazi Party. The book outlines many of Hitler's political beliefs, his political ideology, and his future plans for Germany and the world. Volume 1 of Mein Kampf was published in 1925 and Volume 2 in 1926. The combined volumes encompass roughly 750 pages. Emil Maurice, SS member No. 2, was prominent in early transcription, then most of the editing was done by Hitler's deputy Rudolf Hess.

Hitler began Mein Kampf while imprisoned at Landsberg Prison following his failed coup in Munich in November 1923 and trial in February 1924 for high treason, in which he received a sentence of five years in fortress confinement (Festungshaft). Although he received many visitors initially, he soon devoted himself entirely to the book. As he continued, he realized that it would have to be a two-volume work. The governor of the prison noted at the time that "[Hitler] hopes the book will run into many editions, thus enabling him to fulfill his financial obligations and to defray the expenses incurred at the time of his trial." Hitler spent over a year incarcerated and had the first volume published the summer after his release. After slow initial sales, the book became a bestseller in Germany following Hitler's rise to power in 1933.

After Hitler's death, copyright of Mein Kampf, along with other Nazi assets, was given to the state government of Bavaria, which refused to allow any copying or printing of the book in Germany. In 2016, following the expiry of the copyright held by the Bavarian government, Mein Kampf was republished in Germany for the first time since 1945, which prompted public debate and divided reactions from Jewish groups. A team of scholars from the Institute of Contemporary History in Munich published a two-volume, almost 2,000-page edition annotated with about 3,500 notes. This was followed in 2021 by a nearly 900-page French edition based on the German annotated version, with about twice as much commentary as text.

== Title ==
Hitler originally wanted to call his forthcoming book "Viereinhalb Jahre (des Kampfes) gegen Lüge, Dummheit und Feigheit" ("Four and a Half Years [of Struggle] Against Lies, Stupidity and Cowardice"). Max Amann, head of the Franz Eher Verlag and Hitler's publisher, is said to have suggested the much shorter "Mein Kampf" ("My Struggle").

== Contents ==
The arrangement of chapters is as follows:

- Volume One: A Reckoning
  - Chapter 1: In the House of My Parents
  - Chapter 2: Years of Study and Suffering in Vienna
  - Chapter 3: General Political Considerations Based on My Vienna Period
  - Chapter 4: Munich
  - Chapter 5: The World War
  - Chapter 6: War Propaganda
  - Chapter 7: The Revolution
  - Chapter 8: The Beginning of My Political Activity
  - Chapter 9: The "German Workers' Party"
  - Chapter 10: Causes of the Collapse
  - Chapter 11: Nation and Race
  - Chapter 12: The First Period of Development of the National Socialist German Workers' Party
- Volume Two: The National Socialist Movement
  - Chapter 1: Philosophy and Party
  - Chapter 2: The State
  - Chapter 3: Subjects and Citizens
  - Chapter 4: Personality and the Conception of the Völkisch State
  - Chapter 5: Philosophy and Organization
  - Chapter 6: The Struggle of the Early Period – the Significance of the Spoken Word
  - Chapter 7: The Struggle with the Red Front
  - Chapter 8: The Strong Man Is Mightiest Alone
  - Chapter 9: Basic Ideas Regarding the Meaning and Organization of the Sturmabteilung (Storm Department)
  - Chapter 10: Federalism as a Mask
  - Chapter 11: Propaganda and Organization
  - Chapter 12: The Trade-Union Question
  - Chapter 13: German Alliance Policy After the War
  - Chapter 14: Eastern Orientation or Eastern Policy
  - Chapter 15: The Right of Emergency Defense
- Conclusion
- Index

== Analysis ==
In Mein Kampf, Hitler used the main thesis of "the Jewish peril", which posits a Jewish conspiracy to gain world leadership. The narrative describes the process by which he became increasingly antisemitic and militaristic, especially during his years in Vienna. He speaks of not having met a Jew until he arrived in Vienna, and that at first his attitude was liberal and tolerant. When he first encountered the antisemitic press, he says, he dismissed it as unworthy of serious consideration. Later he accepted the same antisemitic views, which became crucial to his program of national reconstruction of Germany.

Mein Kampf has also been studied as a work on political theory. For example, Hitler announces his hatred of what he believed to be the world's two evils: communism and Judaism. In the book, Hitler blamed Germany's chief woes on the parliament of the Weimar Republic, the Jews, and Social Democrats, as well as Marxists, though he believed that Marxists, Social Democrats, and the parliament were all working for Jewish interests. He announced that he wanted to destroy the parliamentary system completely, believing it to be corrupt in principle, as those who reach power are inherent opportunists.

=== Antisemitism ===
While historians dispute the exact date Hitler decided to exterminate the Jewish people, few place the decision before the mid-1930s. First published in 1925, Mein Kampf shows Hitler's personal grievances and his ambitions for creating a New Order. Hitler also wrote that The Protocols of the Elders of Zion, a fabricated text that purported to expose a Jewish plot to control the world, was an authentic document. This later became a part of the Nazi propaganda effort to justify persecution and annihilation of the Jews.

The historian Ian Kershaw observed that several passages in Mein Kampf are undeniably of a genocidal nature. Hitler wrote "the nationalization of our masses will succeed only when, aside from all the positive struggle for the soul of our people, their international poisoners are exterminated", and he suggested that, "If at the beginning of the war and during the war twelve or fifteen thousand of these Hebrew corrupters of the nation had been subjected to poison gas, such as had to be endured in the field by hundreds of thousands of our very best German workers of all classes and professions, then the sacrifice of millions at the front would not have been in vain."

The racial laws to which Hitler referred resonate directly with his ideas in Mein Kampf. In the first edition, Hitler stated that the destruction of the weak and sick is far more humane than their protection. Apart from this allusion to humane treatment, Hitler saw a purpose in destroying "the weak" in order to provide the proper space and purity for the "strong".

=== Anti-Slavism and Lebensraum (living space) ===
Hitler described that, when he was in Vienna, it was repugnant for him to see the mixture of races "of Czechs, Poles, Hungarians, Ruthenians, Serbs and Croats, and always that infection which dissolves human society, the Jew, were all here and there and everywhere." He also wrote that he viewed the Japanese victory over the Russians in the Russo-Japanese War in 1904 as a "blow to Austrian Slavism".

In the chapter "Eastern Orientation or Eastern Policy", Hitler argued that the Germans needed Lebensraum (living space) in the East, a "historic destiny" that would properly nurture the German people. Hitler believed that "the organization of a Russian state formation was not the result of the political abilities of the Slavs in Russia, but only a wonderful example of the state-forming efficacy of the German element in an inferior race." In Mein Kampf, Hitler openly described his proposed future German expansion in the East, foreshadowing Generalplan Ost:

And so we National Socialists consciously draw a line beneath the foreign policy tendency of our pre-[First World] War period. We take up where we broke off six hundred years ago. We stop the endless German movement to the south and west, and turn our gaze toward the land in the east. At long last we break off the colonial and commercial policy of the pre-War period and shift to the soil policy of the future. If we speak of soil in Europe today, we can primarily have in mind only Russia and her vassal border states.

Hitler wrote that he was against any attempts to Germanise Slavs, and criticised previous attempts at trying to Germanise the Austrian Slavs. He also criticised people in pan-German movements in Germany who thought that forcing ethnic Poles living in Germany to speak the German language would turn them into Germans; he believed that would have caused a "foreign race" by its own "inferiority" to damage the "dignity" and "nobility" of the German nation.

== Sales ==
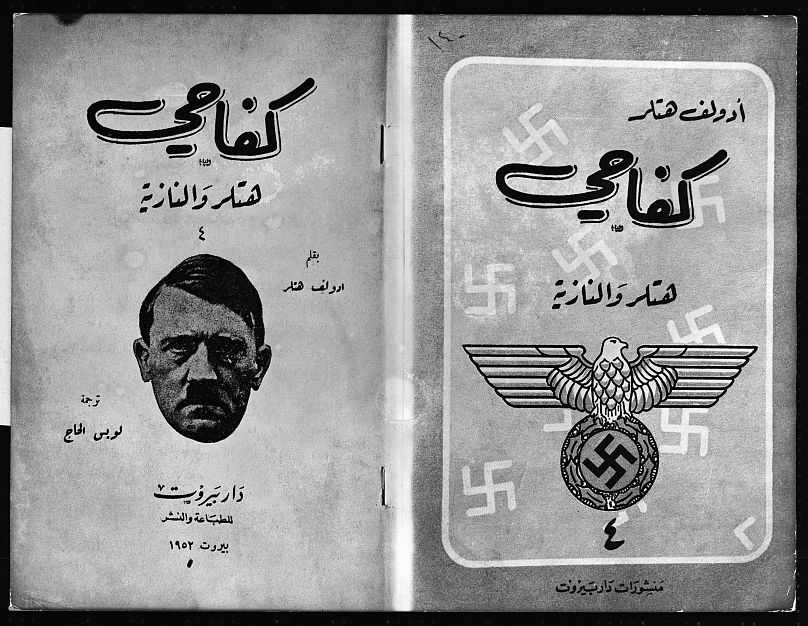
Arabic edition of Mein Kampf

Although Hitler originally wrote Mein Kampf mostly for the followers of Nazism, interest in the work grew after his rise to power. (Two other books written by party members, Gottfried Feder's Breaking The Interest Slavery and Alfred Rosenberg's The Myth of the Twentieth Century, have since lapsed into comparative literary obscurity.) Hitler had made about 1.2 million ℛ︁ℳ︁ from sales of the book by 1933 (equivalent to €5,562,590 in 2021), when the average annual income of a teacher was about 4,800 ℛ︁ℳ︁ (equivalent to €22,250 in 2021). He had accumulated a tax debt of 405,500 ℛ︁ℳ︁ (equivalent to €1,879,692 in 2021) from the sale of about 240,000 copies before he became chancellor in 1933, at which time his debt was waived.

Hitler began to distance himself from the book after becoming chancellor of Germany in 1933. He dismissed it as "fantasies behind bars" that were little more than a series of articles for the Völkischer Beobachter newspaper, and later told Hans Frank that "If I had had any idea in 1924 that I would have become Reich chancellor, I never would have written the book." Nevertheless, Mein Kampf was a bestseller in Germany during the 1930s. During Hitler's years in power, the book was in high demand in libraries and often reviewed and quoted in other publications. It was given free to every newlywed couple and every soldier fighting at the front. By 1939, it had sold 5.2 million copies in eleven languages.

== Contemporary observations ==
Mein Kampf, in essence, lays out the ideological program Hitler established for the Holocaust, by identifying the Jews and "Bolsheviks" as racially and ideologically inferior and threatening, and "Aryans" and National Socialists as racially superior and politically progressive. Hitler's revolutionary goals included expulsion of the Jews, and the unification of the German people into one Greater Germany. Hitler desired to restore German lands to their greatest historical extent, real or imagined.

Due to its racist content and the historical effect of Nazism upon Europe during World War II and the Holocaust, it is considered a highly controversial book. Criticism has not come solely from opponents of Nazism. Italian fascist dictator and Nazi ally Benito Mussolini was also critical of the book, saying that it was "a boring tome that I have never been able to read" and remarking that Hitler's beliefs, as expressed in the book, were "little more than commonplace clichés". The American literary theorist and philosopher Kenneth Burke wrote a 1939 analysis of the work, The Rhetoric of Hitler's "Battle", pointing out an underlying message of aggressive intent.

The American journalist John Gunther said in 1940 that compared to autobiographies such as Leon Trotsky's My Life or Henry Adams's The Education of Henry Adams, Mein Kampf was "vapid, vain, rhetorical, diffuse, prolix." However, he added that "it is a powerful and moving book, the product of great passionate feeling". He suggested that the book exhausted curious German readers, "but with its message, if only by ceaseless repetition of the argument, left impregnably in their minds, fecund and germinating".

In March 1940, British writer George Orwell reviewed a then-recently published uncensored translation of Mein Kampf for The New English Weekly. Orwell suggested that the force of Hitler's personality shone through the often "clumsy" writing, capturing the magnetic allure of Hitler for many Germans. In essence, Orwell notes, Hitler offers only visions of endless struggle and conflict in the creation of "a horrible brainless empire" that "stretch[es] to Afghanistan or thereabouts". He wrote, "Whereas Socialism, and even capitalism in a more grudging way, have said to people 'I offer you a good time,' Hitler has said to them, 'I offer you struggle, danger, and death,' and as a result a whole nation flings itself at his feet." Orwell's review was written in the aftermath of the 1939 Molotov–Ribbentrop Pact, when Hitler made peace with the USSR after more than a decade of vitriolic rhetoric and threats between the two nations; with the pact in place, Orwell believed, England was now facing a risk of Nazi attack, and the UK must not underestimate the appeal of Hitler's ideas.

In his 1943 book The Menace of the Herd, Austrian scholar Erik von Kuehnelt-Leddihn described Hitler's ideas in Mein Kampf and elsewhere as "a veritable reductio ad absurdum of 'progressive thought'" and betraying "a curious lack of original thought" that shows Hitler offered no innovative or original ideas but was merely "a virtuoso of commonplaces which he may or may not repeat in the guise of a 'new discovery.'" Hitler's stated aim, Kuehnelt-Leddihn writes, is to quash individualism in furtherance of political goals:

When Hitler and Mussolini attack the "western democracies" they insinuate that their "democracy" is not genuine. National Socialism envisages abolishing the difference in wealth, education, intellect, taste, philosophy, and habits by a leveling process which necessitates in turn a total control over the child and the adolescent. Every personal attitude will be branded — after communist pattern — as "bourgeois", and this in spite of the fact that the bourgeois is the representative of the most herdist class in the world, and that National Socialism is a basically bourgeois movement. In Mein Kampf, Hitler repeatedly speaks of the "masses" and the "herd" referring to the people. The German people should probably, in his view, remain a mass of identical "individuals" in an enormous sand heap or ant heap, identical even to the color of their shirts, the garment nearest to the body.

In his The Second World War, published in several volumes in the late 1940s and early 1950s, Winston Churchill wrote that he felt that after Hitler's ascension to power, no other book than Mein Kampf deserved more intensive scrutiny.

== Later analysis ==
The critic George Steiner suggested that Mein Kampf can be seen as one of several books that resulted from the crisis of German culture following Germany's defeat in World War I, comparable in this respect to the philosopher Ernst Bloch's The Spirit of Utopia (1918), the historian Oswald Spengler's The Decline of the West (1918), the theologian Franz Rosenzweig's The Star of Redemption (1921), the theologian Karl Barth's The Epistle to the Romans (1922), and the philosopher Martin Heidegger's Being and Time (1927).

== Criticism by translators ==
A number of translators have commented on the poor quality of Hitler's use of language in writing Mein Kampf. Olivier Mannoni, who translated the 2021 French critical edition, said about the original German text that it was "an incoherent soup, one could become half-mad translating it", and that previous translations had corrected the language, giving the false impression that Hitler was a "cultured man" with "coherent and grammatically correct reasoning". He added "To me, making this text elegant is a crime." Mannoni's comments are similar to those made by Ralph Manheim, who produced a translation for Houghton Mifflin in 1943. Manheim wrote in the foreword to that edition, "Where Hitler's formulations challenge the reader's credulity I have quoted the German original in the notes." This evaluation of the poor quality of Hitler's prose and his inability to express his opinions coherently was shared by William S. Schlamm, who reviewed Manheim's translation in The New York Times, writing that "there was not the faintest similarity to a thought and barely a trace of language."

== German publication history ==
While Hitler was in power (1933–1945), Mein Kampf was made available in three common editions, all of which combined both volumes into one book. The first, the Volksausgabe or People's Edition, featured the original cover on the dust jacket and was navy blue underneath with a gold swastika eagle embossed on the cover. The Hochzeitsausgabe, or Wedding Edition, in a slipcase with the seal of the province embossed in gold onto a parchment-like cover was given free to marrying couples. In 1940, the Tornister-Ausgabe, or Knapsack Edition, was released. This edition was a compact, but unabridged, version in a red cover and was released by the post office, available to be sent to soldiers fighting at the front.

The deluxe Jubiläumsausgabe, or Anniversary Issue, containing both volumes, was published in 1939 in honour of Hitler's 50th birthday. It came in both dark blue and bright red boards with a gold sword on the cover. The book could also be purchased as a two-volume set during Hitler's rule, and was available with soft or hard covers. The soft-cover edition had the original cover (as pictured at the top of this article). The hardcover edition had a leather spine with cloth-covered boards. The cover and spine contained an image of three brown oak leaves.

=== 2016 critical edition ===
Along with the rest of his wealth and property, Hitler left the rights to the book to the German state. As Hitler's official place of residence was in Munich, the copyright passed to the government of Bavaria, which refused to allow the book to be republished. The copyright ran out on 31 December 2015.

On 3 February 2010, the Institute of Contemporary History (IfZ) in Munich announced plans to re-publish an annotated version of the text, for educational purposes in schools and universities, in 2016. The book had last been published in Germany in 1945. The IfZ argued that re-publication was necessary to get an authoritative annotated edition by the time the copyright ran out, which might open the way for neo-Nazi groups to publish their own versions. The Bavarian Finance Ministry opposed the plan, citing respect for victims of the Holocaust. It stated that permits for reprints, or a new annotated edition, would not be issued, at home or abroad.

There was disagreement about the issue of whether the republished book might be banned as Nazi propaganda. The Bavarian government emphasized that even after expiration of the copyright, "the dissemination of Nazi ideologies will remain prohibited in Germany and is punishable under the penal code". However, the Bavarian Science Minister Wolfgang Heubisch supported a critical edition, stating in 2010: "Once Bavaria's copyright expires, there is the danger of charlatans and neo-Nazis appropriating this infamous book for themselves."

On 12 December 2013, the Bavarian government cancelled its financial support for an annotated edition. IfZ, which was preparing the translation, announced that it intended to proceed with publication after the copyright expired, and scheduled an edition of Mein Kampf for release in 2016.

Richard Verber, vice-president of the Board of Deputies of British Jews, stated in 2015 that the board trusted the academic and educational value of republishing. "We would, of course, be very wary of any attempt to glorify Hitler or to belittle the Holocaust in any way," Verber declared to The Observer. "But this is not that. I do understand how some Jewish groups could be upset and nervous, but it seems it is being done from a historical point of view and to put it in context."

The annotated edition of Mein Kampf was published in Germany in January 2016 and sold out within hours on Amazon's German site. The two-volume edition included about 3,500 notes and was almost 2,000 pages long. Usually, according to Gerhard Weinberg, the information in the annotated edition that accompanies a chapter is mostly about when the chapter was written, though "in some cases" there is commentary on the nature and argument of the chapter.

The book's publication led to public debate in Germany, and divided reactions from Jewish groups, with some supporting, and others opposing, the decision to publish. German officials had previously said they would limit public access to the text amid fears that its re-publication could stir neo-Nazi sentiment. Some bookstores stated that they would not stock the book. Dussmann, a Berlin bookstore, stated that one copy was available on the shelves in the history section, but that it would not be advertised, and more copies would be available only on order. By January 2017, the German annotated edition had sold over 85,000 copies.

Gerhard Weinberg wrote a generally positive review of the annotated edition, praising the choice to include not only editors' comments but also changes of the original text. He said that notes such as those of chapters eight and nine "will be extremely helpful" about the situation in the time of Hitler's entry into politics and lauded the notes to chapter 11 ("People and Race") as "extensive and very helpful" as well. On the negative side, Weinberg observed that the editors make a false correction at one point; that they miss an informative book on German atrocities during World War I; that they include a survey of Nazi membership too late; and that all of his own work on Hitler goes unmentioned in the bibliography.

== English translations ==
Ever since the early 1930s, the history of Mein Kampf in English has been complicated and an occasion for controversy. No fewer than four full translations were completed before 1945, as well as a number of extracts in newspapers, pamphlets, government documents and unpublished typescripts. Not all of these had official approval from his publishers, Franz Eher Nachfolger. Since the war, the 1943 Ralph Manheim translation has been the most commonly published translation, though other versions have continued to circulate.

== Current availability ==
=== Germany ===
At the time of his suicide, Hitler's official place of residence was in Munich, which led to his entire estate, including all rights to Mein Kampf, changing to the ownership of the state of Bavaria. The government of Bavaria, in agreement with the federal government of Germany, refused to allow any copying or printing of the book in Germany. It also opposed copying and printing in other countries, but with less success. Under German copyright law, the entire text entered the public domain on 1 January 2016, upon the expiration of the calendar year 70 years after the author's death.

Owning and buying the book in Germany is not an offence. Trading in old copies is lawful as well, unless it is done in such a fashion as to "promote hatred or war." In particular, the unmodified edition is not covered by §86 StGB that forbids dissemination of means of propaganda of unconstitutional organizations, since it is a "pre-constitutional work" and as such cannot be opposed to the free and democratic basic order, according to a 1979 decision of the Federal Court of Justice of Germany. Most German libraries carry heavily commented and excerpted versions of Mein Kampf. In 2008, Stephan Kramer, secretary-general of the Central Council of Jews in Germany, not only recommended lifting the ban, but volunteered the help of his organization in editing and annotating the text, saying that it is time for the book to be made available to all online.

After the copyright expired, Mein Kampf was reprinted and sold on a large scale by a right-wing extremist publisher. Several thousand copies were confiscated during a raid. In a court ruling against the publisher's operator, the distribution of the unabridged, uncommented version of Mein Kampf was classified as Incitement of masses in accordance with Section 130 of the German Criminal Code. As a result of the ruling, Mein Kampf was added to the List of Media Harmful to Young People by the Federal Agency for Child and Youth Protection in the Media.

=== Egypt ===
In Egypt, the book was first translated into Arabic in 1937. It had a new translation in 1963 which was reprinted in 1995. The book was also displayed for sale in Cairo's state-run book fairs in 2007, 2021, and 2023.

=== Finland ===
The Nazi group Finnish People's Organisation had circulated an unofficial translation since at least 1934. One of Finland's largest publishing companies, Werner Söderström Osakeyhtiö, was granted publishing rights to Mein Kampf after the Winter War in 1940, and Lauri Hirvensalo was approved as a translator by a German publishing house after WSOY confirmed his "Aryan" ancestry. In 1941–1944, two editions of Mein Kampf, 27,000 and 32,000 copies respectively were sold, a large number in Finland, and professor Veikko Antero Koskenniemi wrote a glowing review of the book for Uusi Suomi newspaper. During the first week after its publication, 8,000 copies were sold. In the 2000s, a group called Nordic Heritage reprinted Mein Kampf. This edition was funded by department store tycoon and Holocaust denier Juha Kärkkäinen. In the 2020s, the Kielletyt Kirjat ('Banned Books') publishing company, linked to the neo-Nazi group Nordic Resistance Movement published new editions of the 1941 translations of Mein Kampf, and it has been sold in department stores in Finland.

Pseudonymous Thomas Dalton, suspected of being a researcher in University of Helsinki has also republished Mein Kampf in the 2020s. In 2026 Mein Kampf has been published in Finnish by an Oulu-based company named Bunkkeri (Bunker) and distributed across the country. The owner of the company is a long-time neo-Nazi who has been convicted of vandalizing a synagogue.

=== France ===
In 1934, the French government unofficially sponsored the publication of an unauthorized translation. It was meant as a warning and included a critical introduction by Marshal Lyautey ("Every Frenchman must read this book"). It was published by far-right publisher Fernand Sorlot in an agreement with the activists of LICRA who bought 5,000 copies to be offered to "influential people"; however, most of them treated the book as a casual gift and did not read it. The Nazi regime unsuccessfully tried to have it forbidden. Hitler, as the author, and Eher-Verlag, his German publisher, had to sue for copyright infringement in the Commercial Court of France. Hitler's lawsuit succeeded in having all copies seized, the print broken up, and having an injunction against booksellers offering any copies. However, a large quantity of books had already been shipped and stayed available undercover by Sorlot.

In 1938, Hitler licensed for France an authorized edition by Fayard, translated by François Dauture and Georges Blond, without the threatening tone against France of the original. The French edition was 347 pages long, while the original title was 687 pages, and it was titled Ma doctrine ("My doctrine"). After the war, Fernand Sorlot re-edited, re-issued, and continued to sell the work, without permission from the state of Bavaria, to which the author's rights had defaulted. In the 1970s, the rise of the extreme right in France along with the growing of Holocaust denial works, placed Mein Kampf under judicial watch, and in 1978 LICRA entered a complaint in the courts against the publisher for inciting antisemitism. Sorlot was issued a "substantial fine", but the court also granted him the right to continue publishing the work, provided certain warnings and qualifiers accompanied the text.

On 1 January 2016, 70 years after Hitler's death, Mein Kampf entered the public domain in France. A new edition was published in 2017 by Fayard, now part of the Groupe Hachette, with a critical introduction like the 2018 edition published in Germany by the Institut für Zeitgeschichte. In 2021, a 1,000-page critical edition, based on the German edition of 2016, was published in France. Titled Historiciser le mal: Une édition critique de Mein Kampf ('Historicizing Evil: A Critical Edition of Mein Kampf'), with almost twice as much commentary as text, it was edited by Florent Brayard and Andraes Wirsching, translated by Olivier Mannoni, and published by Fayard. The print run was deliberately kept small at 10,000, available only by special order, with copies set aside for public libraries. Proceeds from the sale of the edition were earmarked for the Auschwitz-Birkenau Foundation. Some critics who had objected in advance to the edition's publication had fewer objections upon publication. One historian noted that there were so many annotations that Hitler's text had become "secondary."

=== India ===
Since its first publication in India in 1928, Mein Kampf has gone through hundreds of editions and sold over 100,000 copies. Mein Kampf was translated into various Indian languages such as Hindi, Gujarati, Malayalam, Tamil, Marathi and Bengali.

=== Israel ===
An extract of Mein Kampf in Hebrew was first published in 1992 by Akadamon in a run of 400 copies. A complete translation of the book into Hebrew by Dan Yaron, a Vienna-born retired teacher and Holocaust survivor, was published by the Hebrew University of Jerusalem in 1995.

=== Latvia ===
On 5 May 1995, a translation of Mein Kampf released by a small Latvian publishing house Vizītkarte began appearing in bookstores, provoking a reaction from Latvian authorities, who confiscated the approximately 2,000 copies that had made their way to the bookstores and charged director of the publishing house Pēteris Lauva with offences under anti-racism law. Currently the publication of Mein Kampf is forbidden in Latvia. In April 2018, multiple Russian-language news sites (Baltnews, Zvezda, Sputnik, Komsomolskaya Pravda and Komprava among others) reported that Adolf Hitler had allegedly become more popular in Latvia than Harry Potter, referring to a Latvian online book trading platform ibook.lv, where Mein Kampf had appeared at the No. 1 position in "The Most Current Books in 7 Days" list.

Alexa Internet reported that ibook.lv was only the 878th-most-popular website and 149th-most-popular shopping site in Latvia at the time, and only had 4 copies on sale by individual users, and no users wishing to purchase the book. Owner of ibook.lv pointed out that the book list is not based on actual deals but rather page views, of which 70% in the case of Mein Kampf had come from anonymous and unregistered users she believed could be fake users. Ambassador of Latvia to the Russian Federation Māris Riekstiņš responded to the story by tweeting "everyone, who wishes to know what books are actually bought and read in Latvia, are advised to address the largest book stores @JanisRoze; @valtersunrapa; @zvaigzneabc". The BBC also acknowledged the story was fake news, adding that in the last three years Mein Kampf had been requested for borrowing for only 139 times across all libraries in Latvia, in comparison with around 25,000 requests for books about Harry Potter.

=== Netherlands ===
In the Netherlands, Mein Kampf was not available for sale for years following World War II. Sale of the book has been prohibited since a court ruling in the 1980s. In September 2018, however, Dutch publisher Prometheus officially released an academic edition of the 2016 German translation with comprehensive introductions and annotations by Dutch historians. The book is widely available to the general public in the Netherlands for the first time since World War II.

=== Romania ===
On 20 April 1993, under the sponsorship of the vice-president of the Democratic Agrarian Party of Romania, Sibiu-based Pacific publishers began issuing a Romanian edition of Mein Kampf. Authorities promptly banned the sale and confiscated the copies, citing Article 166 of the Penal Code, but the ban was overturned on appeal by the Prosecutor General on 27 May 1993. Chief Rabbi Moses Rosen protested, and on 10 July 1993 President Ion Iliescu asked the Prosecutor General in writing to reinstate the ban of further printing and have the book withdrawn from the market. On 8 November 1993, the Prosecutor General rebuffed Iliescu, stating that the publication of the book was an act of spreading information, not conducting fascist propaganda. Although Iliescu deplored this answer "in strictly judicial terms", this was the end of the matter.

=== Russia ===
In the Soviet Union, Mein Kampf was published in 1933 in a translation by Grigory Zinoviev. In the Russian Federation, Mein Kampf has been published at least three times since 1992; the Russian text is also available on websites. In 2006 the Public Chamber of Russia proposed banning the book. In 2009, St. Petersburg's branch of the Russian Ministry of Internal Affairs requested to remove an annotated and hyper-linked Russian translation of the book from a historiography website. On 13 April 2010, it was announced that Mein Kampf is outlawed on grounds of extremism promotion.

=== Sweden ===
Mein Kampf has been reprinted several times since 1945; in 1970, 1992, 2002 and 2010. In 1992 the Government of Bavaria tried to stop the publication of the book, and the case went to the Supreme Court of Sweden which ruled in favour of the publisher, stating that the book is protected by copyright, but that the copyright holder is unidentified (and not the State of Bavaria) and that the original Swedish publishing firm from 1934 was no longer in existence. It therefore refused the Government of Bavaria's claim.

=== Turkey ===
Mein Kampf (Turkish: Kavgam) was widely available in Turkey selling up to 100,000 copies in just two months in 2005. Analysts and commentators believe the sales of the book to be related to a rise in nationalism and anti-U.S. sentiment. İvo Molinas of Şalom stated this was a result of "what is happening in the Middle East, the Israeli-Palestinian problem and the war in Iraq." Doğu Ergil, a political scientist at Ankara University, said both far-right ultranationalists and extremist Islamists had found common ground – "not on a common agenda for the future, but on their anxieties, fears and hate".

=== United States ===
In the United States, Mein Kampf can be found in many community libraries and can be bought, sold, and traded. It is protected by the First Amendment to the United States Constitution as a matter of freedom of speech and of freedom of the press. The U.S. government seized the U.S. copyright to the book in September 1942 during World War II under the Trading with the Enemy Act. In 1979, Houghton Mifflin bought it from the U.S. government via the U.S. Department of Justice's Office of Alien Property, pursuant to 28 C.F.R. § 0.47. More than 15,000 copies are sold a year. In 2016, Houghton Mifflin Harcourt reported that it was having difficulty finding a charity that would accept profits from the sales of its version of Mein Kampf, which it had promised to donate.

=== Online availability ===
In 1999, the Simon Wiesenthal Center documented that the book was available in Germany via major online booksellers such as Amazon and Barnes & Noble. After a public outcry, both companies agreed to end these sales to addresses in Germany. In March 2020, Amazon banned sales of new and second-hand copies of Mein Kampf, and several other Nazi publications, on its platform. The book remains available on Barnes and Noble's website. It is also available in multiple languages, including German, at the Internet Archive. One of the first complete English translations, completed by James Vincent Murphy in 1939, is freely available on Project Gutenberg Australia.

== Sequel ==
Hitler believed that the reason for the Nazi party's poor showing in the 1928 elections was the public's misunderstanding of his ideas. He retired to Munich to dictate a sequel to Mein Kampf to expand on its ideas, with more focus on foreign policy. Only two copies of the 200-page manuscript were originally made, and only one of these was ever made public. The document was neither edited nor published during the Nazi era, and remains known as Zweites Buch, or 'Second Book'. To keep the document strictly secret, in 1935 Hitler ordered that it be placed in a safe in an air raid shelter, where it remained until being discovered by an American officer in 1945.

The authenticity of the document found in 1945 has been verified by Josef Berg, a former employee of the Nazi publishing house Eher Verlag, and Telford Taylor, a former brigadier general of the United States Army Reserve and Chief Counsel at the Nuremberg war-crimes trials. In 1958, the Zweites Buch was found in the archives of the United States by American historian Gerhard Weinberg. Unable to find an American publisher, Weinberg turned to his mentor – Hans Rothfels at the Institute of Contemporary History in Munich – and his associate Martin Broszat, who published Zweites Buch in 1961. A pirated edition was published in English in New York in 1962. The first authoritative English edition was not published until 2003 (Hitler's Second Book: The Unpublished Sequel to Mein Kampf, ISBN 1-929631-16-2).

== See also ==
- Berlin Without Jews, a dystopian satirical novel about German antisemitism, published in the same year as Mein Kampf
- Bibliography of the Holocaust
- Generalplan Ost, Hitler's "new order of ethnographical relations"
- Ich Kämpfe
- Gustave Le Bon, a main influence on this book and crowd psychology
- List of books banned by governments
- LTI – Lingua Tertii Imperii
- Mein Kampf in Arabic
- The Myth of the Twentieth Century

== Bibliography ==
- Bullock, Alan (1999) [1952]. Hitler: A Study in Tyranny. New York: Konecky & Konecky. ISBN 978-1-56852-036-0.
- Shirer, William L. (1960). The Rise and Fall of the Third Reich. New York: Simon and Schuster.
