= Landis =

Landis is a surname. Notable people with the surname include:

- Arthur H. Landis, American science fiction and fantasy writer
- Bill Landis, American baseball player
- Carole Landis, American film actress
- Cary D. Landis, American attorney and politician
- Charles B. Landis, U.S. Representative from Indiana
- Charles K. Landis, American property developer in southern New Jersey
- Cullen Landis, American film actor
- David Landis, American politician
- Evgenii Landis, Russian mathematician
- Floyd Landis, American cyclist
- Forrest Landis, American child actor
- Frederick Landis, U.S. Representative from Indiana
- Gerald W. Landis, American educator and politician
- Geoffrey A. Landis, American scientist and science fiction writer
- Ira Landis, Mennonite writer
- James M. Landis, American lawyer, academic, and government official
- James Nobel Landis, American electrical-power engineer
- James P. Landis, soldier in the American Civil War and Medal of Honor recipient
- Jean Landis, American aviator
- Jessie Royce Landis, American actress
- Jill Marie Landis, American romance author
- Jim Landis, American baseball player
- John Landis, American film actor and director
- John D. Landis (urban planner), Professor of City and Regional Planning at the University of Pennsylvania
- Joshua Landis, American scholar of the Middle East
- Kenesaw Mountain Landis, U.S. Federal judge and Commissioner of Major League Baseball
- Mark A. Landis, American art forger
- Max Landis, American screenwriter
- Merkel Landis, American lawyer and businessman
- Michele Landis Dauber, American academic
- Nina Landis, Australian actress
- Monte Landis, Scottish actor
- Reed G. Landis, American military aviator
- Richard Landis, American record producer and musician
- Story Landis, American neurobiologist
