= New Britain Movement =

The New Britain Movement was a short lived political organization in 1930s Britain. It advocated a heterogeneous collection of political ideas including guild socialism, European federalism as a first step to world Federalism, a three way parliament based on the ideas of Rudolf Steiner and a monetary reform that would abolish banks. By the end of 1933 it grew to 77 branches, and its eponymous weekly newspaper had a circulation of 32,000 copies. However the group soon split into four different factions and dissolved in 1935.

== History ==
The movement was spun out from periodicals edited by Alfred Orage, and proposed a social state, the conception of which was influenced by Benchara Branford, brother of Victor Branford. The quarterly New Britain was launched in 1933 with articles by Gerald Heard, Frederick Soddy, and George Scott Williamson, and essays by Samuel George Hobson and Philip Mairet. New Britain Weekly was then launched in May 1933.

Among those involved as organisers were George Catlin, Hobson and J. T. Murphy. W. J. Brown, a Member of Parliament who declared himself an independent, joined the movement as Catlin did, via the New Party.

For a time John Macmurray was prominent in the movement, with Williamson and others such as Aubrey Thomas Westlake (1893–1985), like Williamson a physician, who went on to involvement in the early days of British organic farming. Membership overlapped with a number of groups of the time with similar aims, in the case of Westlake with Grith Fyrd.

Among its successors were the House of Industry League, involving Hobson; and the People's Front Propaganda Committee, involving Murphy.
