= John Landis (urban planner) =

John David Landis is the Crossways Professor of City and Regional Planning and Department Chair of the Department of City and Regional Planning at the University of Pennsylvania. Landis attended MIT and UC Berkeley.
