= Franz Eher Nachfolger =

Central publishing house of the Nazi Party

Franz Eher Nachfolger GmbH
- Founded: 2 January 1887
- Founder: Franz Eher
- Defunct: 29 October 1945
- Successor: Max Amann
- Country of origin: Germany
- Headquarters location: Munich, Germany
- Key people: Rolf Rienhard; Wilhelm Baur
- Nonfiction topics: Politics

Franz Eher Nachfolger GmbH (Franz Eher and Successors, LLC, usually referred to as the Eher-Verlag (Eher Publishing)) was the central publishing house of the Nazi Party and one of the largest book and periodical firms during the Nazi regime. It was acquired by the party on 17 December 1920 for 115,000 Papiermark.

In addition to the major papers, the Völkischer Beobachter and the Illustrierter Beobachter, the publishers also printed novels, maps, song books, and calendars. The weekly satirical magazine Die Brennessel and the listings magazine N.S.-Funk were also publications of the company. Adolf Hitler's Mein Kampf was also published by the firm from 1925 through many editions and millions of copies.

== History ==
The publishing house was registered by Franz Xaver Josef Eher (1851–1918) in the Munich Handelsregister on 2 December 1901. However, the firm was actually founded with the name Münchener Beobachter on 2 January 1887. After Eher's death, Rudolf von Sebottendorf took over the firm in 1918 and on 30 September 1919 transformed it into a limited liability company in order to avoid possible bankruptcy.

In December 1920, funds provided by Franz Ritter von Epp allowed Adolf Hitler to buy the majority of shares in the company, which was of interest to him as the publisher of the debt-ridden Völkischer Beobachter. Hitler's wartime sergeant Max Amann then assumed publishing duties and Alfred Rosenberg took over the editing of the title. The remaining shares were purchased by Hitler on behalf of the Nazi Party during the early twenties.

The headquarters were in Munich (Thierschstraße 11–17), and from 1933, the entire party literature was printed and published by Eher-Verlag. Later branches in Berlin, Vienna, and additional branches in Munich were established. Between 1933 and 1943, Rolf Rienhard was chief administrator. He was relieved by Wilhelm Baur, who remained until the end of the war.

The key figure leading the publishing house's expansion, however, was Max Amann, who doubled as Reich Press Leader and president of the Reich Press Chamber. In addition to the Eher-Verlag, he controlled nearly the entire economic function of the press in Germany. Often, Amann (in his government role) expropriated rival papers whose publishers were not willing to do the government's bidding. He then had the Eher-Verlag buy them for a pittance, usually in auctions in which the Eher-Verlag was the sole bidder. During the 1930s the Nazi Party purchased parts of the Alfred Hugenberg concerns and a number of other publishing houses. By the 1940s, these tactics turned the Eher Verlag into one of the largest newspaper chains in the world.

On 29 October 1945, the publisher was closed down according to Law no. 2 of the Allied Control Council (Termination and Liquidation of Nazi Organizations) and the firm's buildings and intellectual property (including Mein Kampf) were transferred to the state of Bavaria. It was formally liquidated in 1952.

== Notable books ==
- Adolf Hitler, Mein Kampf. Eine Abrechnung (published 1925).
- Alfred-Ingemar Berndt, Tanks Break Through! A German Soldier's Account of War in the Low Countries and France, 1940.
- Leo Leixner, From Lemberg to Bordeaux A German War Correspondent’s Account of Battle in Poland, the Low Countries and France, 1939–40 (published 1941).
- Ich Kämpfe, (published 1942).

== See also ==
- List of Nazi publishers
