= Leo Leixner =

Austrian war correspondent

- Born: Leopold Leixner; March 26, 1908; Thörl-Maglern, Duchy of Carinthia, Austria-Hungary
- Died: August 14, 1942 (aged 34); Krasnodar/Kuban, RSFSR, USSR
- Relatives: Marga Käthe Leixner (née Gambalis- Altmann)
- Military career
- Allegiance: Nazi Germany
- Branch: Army
- Rank: Wachtmeister
- Conflicts: World War II
- Awards: Iron Cross First Class

Leo Leixner (1908–1942) was an Austrian journalist and war correspondent. He is known for his book From Lemberg to Bordeaux, a first-hand account of war in Poland, the Low Countries, and France, 1939–40, during World War II.

== Early life and education ==
Leo Leixner, a schoolteacher's son, was born in Thörl-Maglern, Austria, on March 26, 1908, and graduated in 1918 from the German National Real Gymnasium in Villach. He studied German Literature at the University of Graz and received his Doctor of Philosophy in 1932, with a dissertation entitled Mohammed in German Poetry.

== Journalist and war correspondent ==
After 1933, Leixner wrote for Der Angriff newspaper, and was assigned to the Vienna office. He also wrote for the Völkischer Beobachter and other Nazi publications. On August 22, 1939, Leixner volunteered for the Wehrmacht. His most popular book was the illustrated From Lemberg to Bordeaux: Front Experiences of a War Reporter (1941).

== Death ==
Leixner was killed on 14 August 1942 in Krasnodar-Kuban (Russia). He was shot through the head while crossing the Kuban River in an inflatable boat. He was awarded an Iron Cross First Class on the day of his death.

== Books ==
- Von Lemberg bis Bordeaux: Fronterlebnisse eines Kriegsberichters (From Lemberg to Bordeaux: Front Experiences of a War Reporter by Leo Leixner. 11 editions published between 1941 and 1942 in German and held by 71 WorldCat member libraries worldwide)
- Generaloberst Eugen Ritter von Schobert; Lebensbild eines deutschen Armeeführers by Leo Leixner. Four editions published in 1942 in German and held by 13 WorldCat member libraries worldwide
