= LXXXIX Army Corps =

LXXXIX Corps
- LXXXIX. Armeekorps
- Active: August 1942 – March 1945
- Country: Nazi Germany
- Branch: Heer (Wehrmacht)
- Size: Corps

Commanders
- Notable commanders: Alfred Ritter von Hubicki; Hugo Höfl; Werner Freiherr von und zu Gilsa; Friedrich-Wilhelm Neumann; Gustav Höhne

The LXXXIX Army Corps (German: LXXXIX. Armeekorps) was an army corps of Germany's Wehrmacht during World War II. It was active from August 1942 until March 1945. Its commander surrendered to United States Army forces on 2 April 1945.

== History ==
=== Formation, 1942 ===
The LXXXIX Army Corps, also referred to in writing as 'Roman 89th Army Corps' (German: röm. 89. AK) in script to avoid confusion with the Roman numerals, was formed under the name Generalkommando Y on 2 August 1942 in occupied France. The corps was initially attached to 15th Army (Haase) under Army Group D (von Rundstedt). It was subsequently renamed Generalkommando Schelde on 9 August 1942, before eventually receiving the designation LXXXIX. Armeekorps on 25 October 1942. Its initial subordinate divisions were the 39th, 65th and 712th Infantry Divisions. The first commander of Generalkommando Schelde and LXXXIX Army Corps was Alfred Ritter von Hubicki, the former commander of the 9th Panzer Division.

=== Occupation duties in France, 1942 – 1944 ===
The corps headquarters was in Antwerp for most of 1943 as well as early 1944. From here, it commanded coastal garrison troops in the southwestern Netherlands and at the Belgian coast. For instance, it oversaw the 65th Infantry Division at Middelburg, the 712th Infantry Division at Oostburg and the 171st Infantry Division at Diksmuide in April 1943. By early June 1944, as Allied troops were about to land in Normandy, the corps headquarters were still at Antwerp, and its subordinate 48th, 712th and 165th Infantry Divisions were stationed at Ostende, Oostburg and Middelburg, respectively. It formed a line along the French coast together with the LXXXII, LXXXXI, LXVII and LXXXI corps.

=== Western Front, 1944 – 1945 ===
As Allied armies were advancing through France, LXXXIX Army Corps took the far right flank of 15th Army, which was in turn on the far right of the German lines, to the right of the 1st Parachute Army. At 15 September 1944, it stood south of Breskens, to the right of LXXXVI Army Corps, which was also part of the 15th Army.

By early November 1944, the LXXXIX Army Corps had been transferred from the 15th Army to the 1st Army under Army Group G (Hausser). In late December 1944, LXXXIX Army Corps was reinforced by most of the personnel of Division Rässler. Beginning in January 1945, the LXXXIX Army Corps was also called Group Höhne (German: Gruppe Höhne).

==== The defense of the Moselle and Rhine ====
In March 1945, the LXXXIX Army Corps was called upon by the commander of Army Group G, Paul Hausser, to defend the Moselle line. The corps command started to arrive there by 9 March 1945. The LXXXIX Army Corps was tasked with the defense of the Moselle from Koblenz over Wierschem to a sector north of Cochem. Here, it stood to the right of XIII Army Corps (von Oriola), which consisted of the remnants of the 2nd Panzer Division as well as three Volksgrenadier Divisions. The corps was insufficiently equipped to defend the serpentine mountainous Moselle area, as it lacked both the manpower required to defend the north bank as well as the reserves required to beat back Allied attempts to cross the Moselle. Although not nominally part of LXXXIX Army Corps, Höhne also assumed effective control of Kampfgruppe Koblenz, a local defense force of 1,800 men from the Koblenz area, as well as the 276th Infantry Division, which had escaped from the Eifel region. The 6th SS Mountain Division (Brenner) was nominally assigned to LXXXIX Army Corps by Hausser, but only parts of it reached the corps in time before the sector of LXXXIX Army Corps fell under heavy American attack.

On 12 March 1945, the U.S. Third Army (Patton) began its attack against Army Group G. The American XX Corps (Walker) bound the attention of the Army Group G reserves with an initial attack, whereupon the American XII Corps (Eddy) crossed the Moselle in the sector defended by LXXXIX Army Corps. The remainders of the depleted 6th SS Mountain Division began joining the LXXXIX Army Corps piecemeal on the morning of 15 March 1945, whereupon they were sent by Höhne against the left flank of the U.S. 90th Infantry Division in a futile attempt to push back against the Moselle bridgehead established by XII Corps and to hold open a retreat route towards the Rhine river. In heavy fighting until the 17 March 1945, the LXXXIX Army Corps was split in half by an armored thrust by XII Corps, as the 559th Volksgrenadier Division was rushed in by Hausser to assist the sector. Having accepted that the forces west of the American breakthrough were lost, the part of LXXXIX Army Corps to the east of the breach were ordered by Hans Felber of 7th Army to make a fighting retreat towards the Rhine and to cross it if necessary. At noon on the 16 March 1945, the remainders of the LXXXIX Army Corps was ordered to cease its defensive efforts on the west bank of the Rhine, and began withdrawing to the east bank. The Kampfgruppe Koblenz did however remain in the Koblenz urban area on the west bank to make a last stand. The troops that arrived on the east bank of the Rhine as part of the retreat by LXXXIX Army Corps numbered around 1,700. They were helped in their retreat by a lack of American activity; the 4th Armored Division (Gaffey), part of XII Corps, had paused to regroup after establishing a bridgehead across the Nahe river.

By 25 March 1945, the 6th SS Mountain Division had been called away by Albert Kesselring, the commanding general of Army Group D and thus Supreme Commander of the Wehrmacht forces in the West, towards Wiesbaden, weakening the defensive position of LXXXIX Army Corps east of the Rhine even further, just before the U.S. VIII Corps (Middleton) crossed the Rhine Gorge into the sector defended by LXXXIX Army Corps.

==== The collapse of LXXXIX Army Corps ====
The total collapse of LXXXIX Army Corps began on 27 March 1945, when the corps was dislodged from its positions on the east bank of the Rhine by the advancing American VIII Corps. The corps had been nominally assigned back to the 15th Army under Army Group B (Model) during the leadup to the American attack, but the LXXXIX Army Corps had not established any contact to its new commanding army and very little contact to its new commanding army group. Further weakened by the loss of the 6,000 soldiers of the 6th SS Mountain Division, the LXXXIX Army Corps had no hope of repelling the U.S. VIII Corps. Kesselring reverted his decision after news arrived of the American advances, and attempted to engage the 6th SS Mountain Division to defend the Lahn river in the Limburg area, but the 6th SS Mountain Division was out of fuel, and its troops, now marching on foot, came too late to prevent Limburg's capture by American troops on 26 March.

Faced with the VIII Corps in the west and threatened by the American breakthrough at Limburg, Höhne, at last in contact with Kesselring, requested the right to retreat his battered forces towards the east, but was denied. By now, only the 276th Infantry Division remained barely in fighting condition within the LXXXIX Army Corps. With a threat of the 276th Division's collapse, Höhne disobeyed Kesselring's instructions and retreated anyway. His own headquarters had already fallen under enemy fire when he and his remaining staff officers retreated. With this retreat, the LXXXIX Army Corps disintegrated. Its personnel did not serve another purpose until the German surrender on 8 May 1945.

In the meantime, the remainders of the 6th SS Mountain Division, numbering some 2,000 troops, took to setting up roadblocks on the motorways they attempted to defend, in spite of the fact that several American contingents had already passed them by on either side. Starting on 30 March 1945, the 6th SS Mountain Division attempted to infiltrate back into German-controlled territory, but the remainders of the division were pinned down and 800 survivors forced to surrender on 2 April 1945. 500 members of the 6th SS Mountain Division had been killed during the last few days. Their American counterparts were partially spurred on by false rumors that the members of the 6th SS Mountain Division had murdered and raped staff members of an American military hospital from which they had stolen fuel in the last few days.

With the collapse of LXXXIX Army Corps and the destruction of the 6th SS Mountain Division, the American forces had punched a hole between Army Group B and Army Group G. The only division left in any position to retaliate, the 11th Panzer Division, was quickly defeated before an effective response could be formulated. The collapse of the LXXXIX Army Corps was partially brought about by the fact that the corps had not retreated quickly enough when faced with the Rhine Gorge crossing by the U.S. VIII Corps.

On 2 April 1945, Höhne was captured by American forces and formally surrendered to a Quartermaster detachment in the American rear.

The LXXXIX Army Corps was marked 'Verbleib unbekannt' (German: status unknown) by the German high command starting in April 1945.

== Noteworthy individuals ==
- Alfred Ritter von Hubicki, first and third corps commander (2 August 1942 to 18 December 1942 and 30 April 1943 to 11 June 1943).
- Hugo Höfl, second corps commander (18 December 1942 to 30 April 1943).
- Werner Freiherr von und zu Gilsa, fourth and sixth corps commander (11 June 1943 to 12 January 1944 and 29 January 1944 to 23 November 1944).
- Friedrich-Wilhelm Neumann, fifth corps commander (12 January 1944 to 29 January 1944).
- Gustav Höhne, seventh and final corps commander (23 November 1944 until the end of the war).

== Organizational chart ==
Superior formations over LXXXIX Army Corps
Name	Year	Month	Army	Army Group	Operational Area
Generalkommando Schelde	1942	September – October	15th Army	Army Group D	Antwerp
LXXXIX Armeekorps	1942	November – December	15th Army	Army Group D	Antwerp
LXXXIX Armeekorps	1943		15th Army	Army Group D	Antwerp
LXXXIX Armeekorps	1944	January – April	15th Army	Army Group D	Antwerp
LXXXIX Armeekorps	1944	May – October	15th Army	Army Group B	Belgium, Netherlands
LXXXIX Armeekorps	1944	November – December	1st Army	Army Group G	Saarpfalz
LXXXIX Armeekorps	1945	January – March	1st Army	Army Group G	Saarpfalz
LXXXIX Armeekorps	1945	April – May	Status unknown		

Subordinate units under LXXXIX Army Corps
Year	Date	Army	Subordinate divisions
1942	2 Sep	15th Army	65th, 39th, 712th
1942	8 Oct	15th Army	65th, 39th, 712th
1942	5 Nov	15th Army	65th, 39th, 712th
1942	1 Dec	15th Army	65th, 712th
1943	1 Jan	15th Army	65th, 712th
1943	3 Feb	15th Army	65th, 712th
1943	4 Mar	15th Army	65th, 712th
1943	9 Apr	15th Army	65th, 712th
1943	1 May	15th Army	171st, 712th, 65th
1943	1 Jun	15th Army	171st, 712th, 65th
1943	7 Jul	15th Army	171st, 712th, 19th LFD
1943	5 Aug	15th Army	171st, 712th, 19th LFD
1943	5 Sep	15th Army	264th, 171st, 712th, 19th LFD
1943	4 Oct	15th Army	264th, 171st, 712th, 19th LFD
1943	8 Nov	15th Army	171st, 712th, 19th LFD
1943	3 Dec	15th Army	171st, 712th, 19th LFD
1944	1 Jan	15th Army	272nd, 171st, 712th, 19th LFD
1944	12 Feb	15th Army	48th, 712th, 165th
1944	11 Mar	15th Army	48th, 19th LFD, 712th, 165th
1944	8 Apr	15th Army	48th, 712th, 165th
1944	11 May	15th Army	48th, 712th, 165th
1944	12 Jun	15th Army	48th, 712th, 165th
1944	17 Jul	15th Army	48th, 712th, 165th
1944	31 Aug	15th Army	182nd, 64th, 59th, 712th, 70th
1944	16 Sep	15th Army	64th, 145th
1944	13 Oct	15th Army	344th, 712th
1944	5 Nov	1st Army	553rd, 361st
1944	26 Nov	1st Army	553rd, 245th, 256th
1944	31 Dec	1st Army	256th, 245th, 361st
1945	19 Feb	1st Army	905th, 257th, 245th, 47th
1945	1 Mar	1st Army	905th, 257th
