= Operation Lumberjack =

WWII allied military operation in Germany

- Part of the Western Allied invasion of Germany in the Western Front of the European theatre of World War II
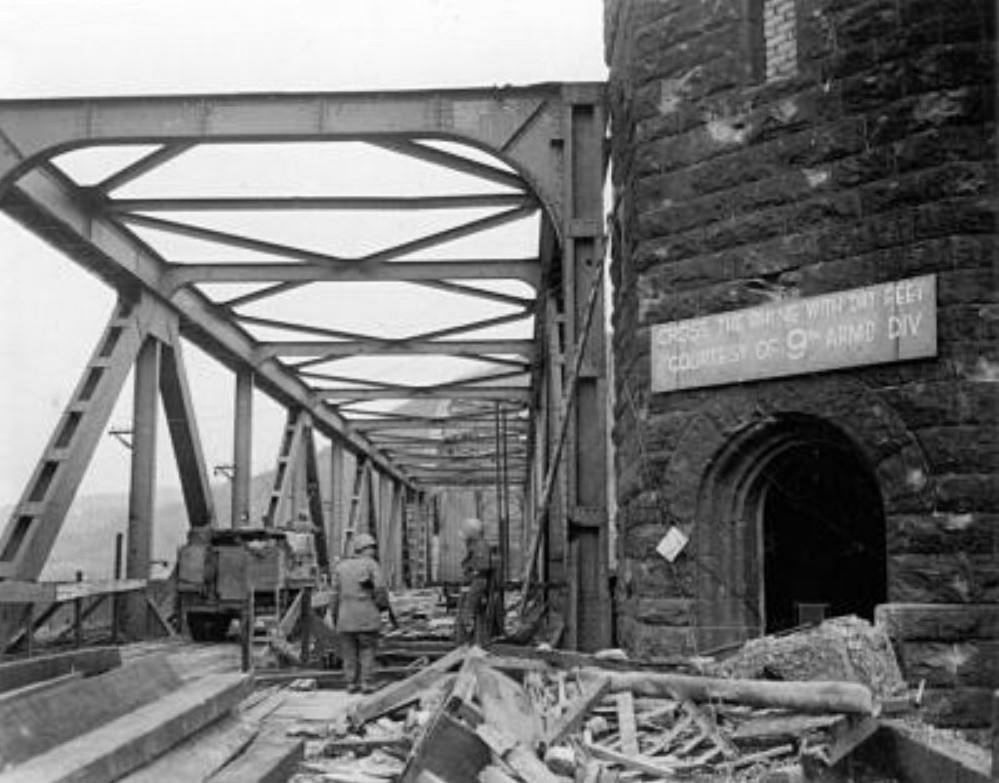
- American forces cross the Ludendorff Bridge at Remagen.
Date	1–25 March 1945
Location	Remagen, Rhineland-Palatinate, Germany 50.58°N 7.24°E
Result	Allied victory

Belligerents
United States; United Kingdom; Belgium	Germany

Commanders and leaders
(United States) Courtney Hodges	(Nazi Germany) Walter Model

Strength
(United States) 1st Army	(Nazi Germany) 15th Army (Nazi Germany) 5th Panzer Army (Nazi Germany) Volkssturm (Nazi Germany) 7th Army

Casualties and losses
7,400: 1,700 killed	5,700+ killed & wounded 19,000 captured Total: 24,700 casualties

Operation Lumberjack was a military operation with the goal of capturing the west bank of the Rhine River and seizing key German cities, near the end of World War II in Europe. The First United States Army launched the operation in March 1945 to capture strategic cities (Cologne, Bonn, and Koblenz) in Nazi Germany and to give the Allies a foothold along the Rhine.

One unexpected outcome was the capture of the Ludendorff bridge, a strategic railroad bridge across the Rhine, in the Battle of Remagen. Despite German attempts to destroy the bridge, Allied forces captured it intact and were able to use it along with pontoon and treadway bridges to establish a bridgehead. The bridge finally collapsed at 3:00 pm on 17 March 1945 after ten days of aircraft bombing, direct artillery hits, near misses, and demolition attempts.

== Background ==
Following the decisive Allied containment and defeat of the German Ardennes Offensive in January 1945, Supreme Allied Commander General Dwight D. Eisenhower committed the Allied Expeditionary Force to a methodically synchronized broad-front strategy to advance toward the German heartland. The immediate, absolute operational prerequisite for any deep penetration into central Germany was the systematic eradication of all remaining Axis resistance west of the Rhine River, a formidable natural barrier that served as the outer wall of the Nazi defensive system. Eisenhower's plan sought to exploit the severe attrition suffered by the Wehrmacht during winter fighting, aiming to completely secure the left bank of the river to deny the enemy a springboard for counterattacks and to minimize the logistical vulnerabilities of Allied supply lines before launching a mass crossing.

Operation Lumberjack was conceived by General Omar Bradley’s U.S. 12th Army Group as a rapid, violent pincer movement designed to trap and destroy General Gustav-Adolf von Zangen's highly depleted 15th Army before they could orderly withdraw across the river. The offensive architecture called for a dual-axis assault: Lieutenant General Courtney Hodges’s U.S. First Army would launch a major southeastern drive from the Aachen sector toward the Rhine plain near Cologne and Bonn, while Lieutenant General George S. Patton’s U.S. Third Army would simultaneously strike northeast through the rugged, heavily wooded terrain of the Eifel region. By converging on the Rhine north of the Moselle, the combined American forces intended to encircle Field Marshal Walter Model’s Army Group B against the western banks. While Allied high command explicitly budgeted for the systematic and total German demolition of all permanent river spans—assuming a contested amphibious assault would be mandatory—the catastrophic decay of German logistical networks, fuel reserves, and localized command-and-control communication ultimately created the tactical vacuum that permitted the unexpected capture of the Ludendorff Bridge at Remagen.

=== Allied forces ===
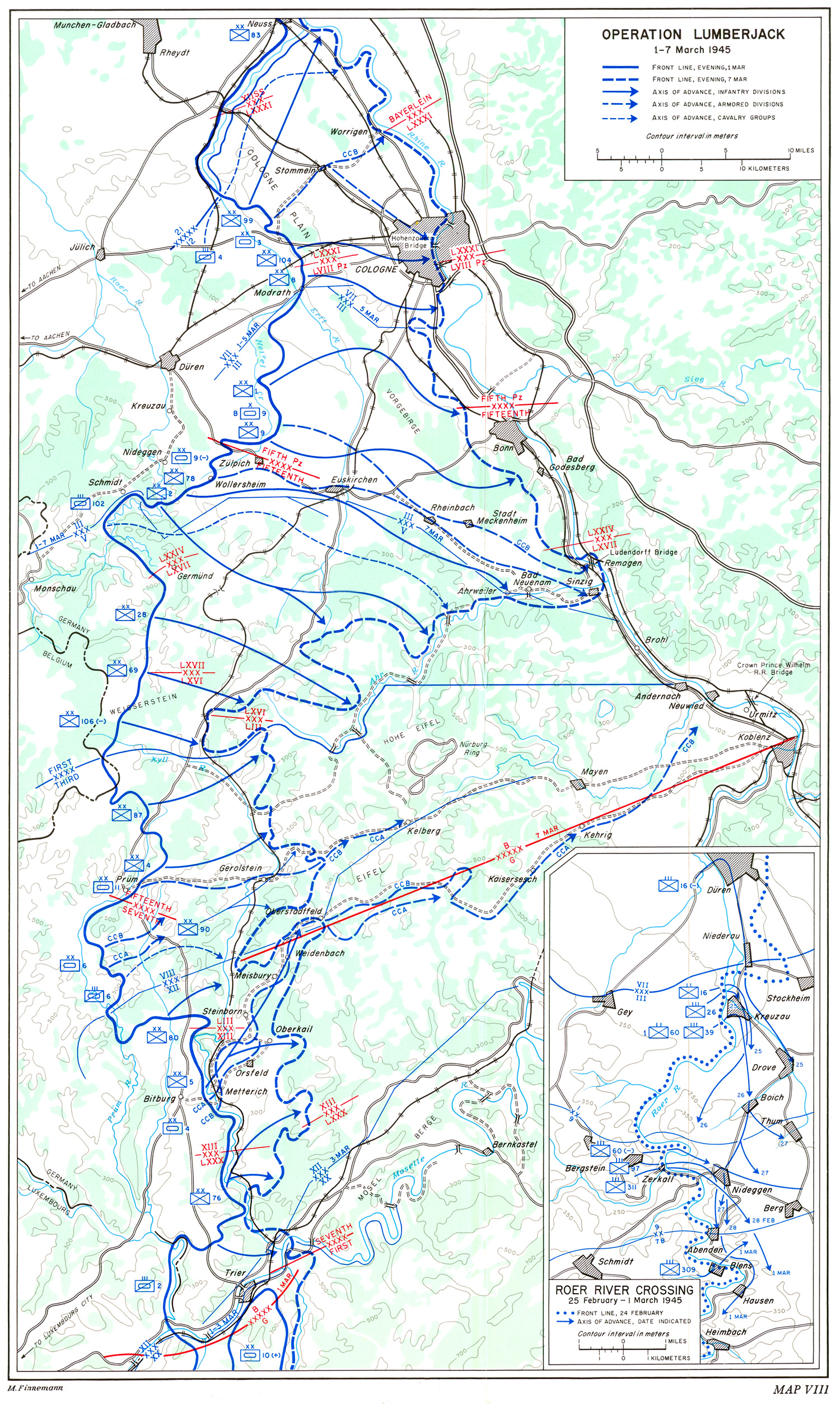
Operation Lumberjack, 1–7 March 1945

During the operation, the U.S. First Army controlled:

- III Corps (Major General John Millikin),
  - 9th Armored Division,
  - 1st Infantry Division,
  - 9th Infantry Division,
  - 78th Infantry Division
- V Corps (Major General Clarence R. Huebner),
  - 2nd Infantry Division,
  - 28th Infantry Division,
  - 69th Infantry Division,
  - 106th Infantry Division
  - 7th Armored Division (not committed to the operation and transferred to the III Corps by March 7).
- VII Corps (Major General J. Lawton Collins),
  - 3rd Armored Division
  - 8th Infantry Division,
  - 99th Infantry Division,
  - 104th Infantry Division.

During Operation Lumberjack, the U.S. Army's 9th Armored Division was tasked with mopping up elements of the German Army trapped on the west bank of the Rhine and to prevent a counterattack against the Ninth Army's flank. They were to secure the region between Mosel and the Duren-Cologne and to destroy the German army's capability to fight in that area. The First Army was to seize the entire region west of the Rhine. After capturing Cologne, the First Army was to wheel southeast and join up with Patton's Third Army. Patton was supposed to capture the Eifel Mountains and then the Mosel Valley, trapping the remainder of the German Seventh Army in the Eifel area.

=== German forces ===
From north to south, the attacking U.S. forces were confronted by

- German Fifteenth Army (General der Infanterie Gustav-Adolf von Zangen),
  - LXXXI Corps (Friedrich Köchling, from March 10 Ernst-Günther Baade)
    - 9th Panzer Division
    - 11th Panzer Division
    - 363rd Infantry Division
    - 59th Infantry Division
    - Divisionsstab 476
  - LVIII Panzer Corps (Walter Krüger)
    - 353rd Infantry Division
    - 12th Infantry Division
    - 3rd Panzergrenadier Division
- German Fifth Panzer Army (General der Panzertruppe Hasso von Manteuffel, from March 9 Generaloberst Josef Harpe)
  - LXXIV Corps (Carl Püchler)
    - 85th Infantry Division
    - 272nd Infantry Division
    - 3rd Airborne Division
  - LXVII Corps (Otto Hitzfeld)
    - 89th Infantry Division
    - 277th Infantry Division
  - LXVI Corps (Walther Lucht)
    - 5th Airborne Division.

Over 75,000 German troops were on the western banks of the bridge. Their only escape route was across the Ludendorff bridge.

Written permission was required to destroy the bridge because on 14–15 October 1944, an American bomb had struck the Mulheim Bridge in Cologne and hit the chamber containing the demolition charges, prematurely destroying the bridge. Hitler was angered by this incident and ordered those "responsible" for the destruction of the Mulheim Bridge to be court-martialed. He also ordered that demolition explosives should not be laid in place until the very last moment, when the Allies were within 5 miles (8.0 km) of the bridge. The bridges should only be demolished following an order in writing from the officer in charge, and only as a last resort and at the last possible moment. This order left officers responsible for destroying bridges nervous about both the consequences if they blew up the bridge too soon and if they failed to blow it up at all.

== Battle ==
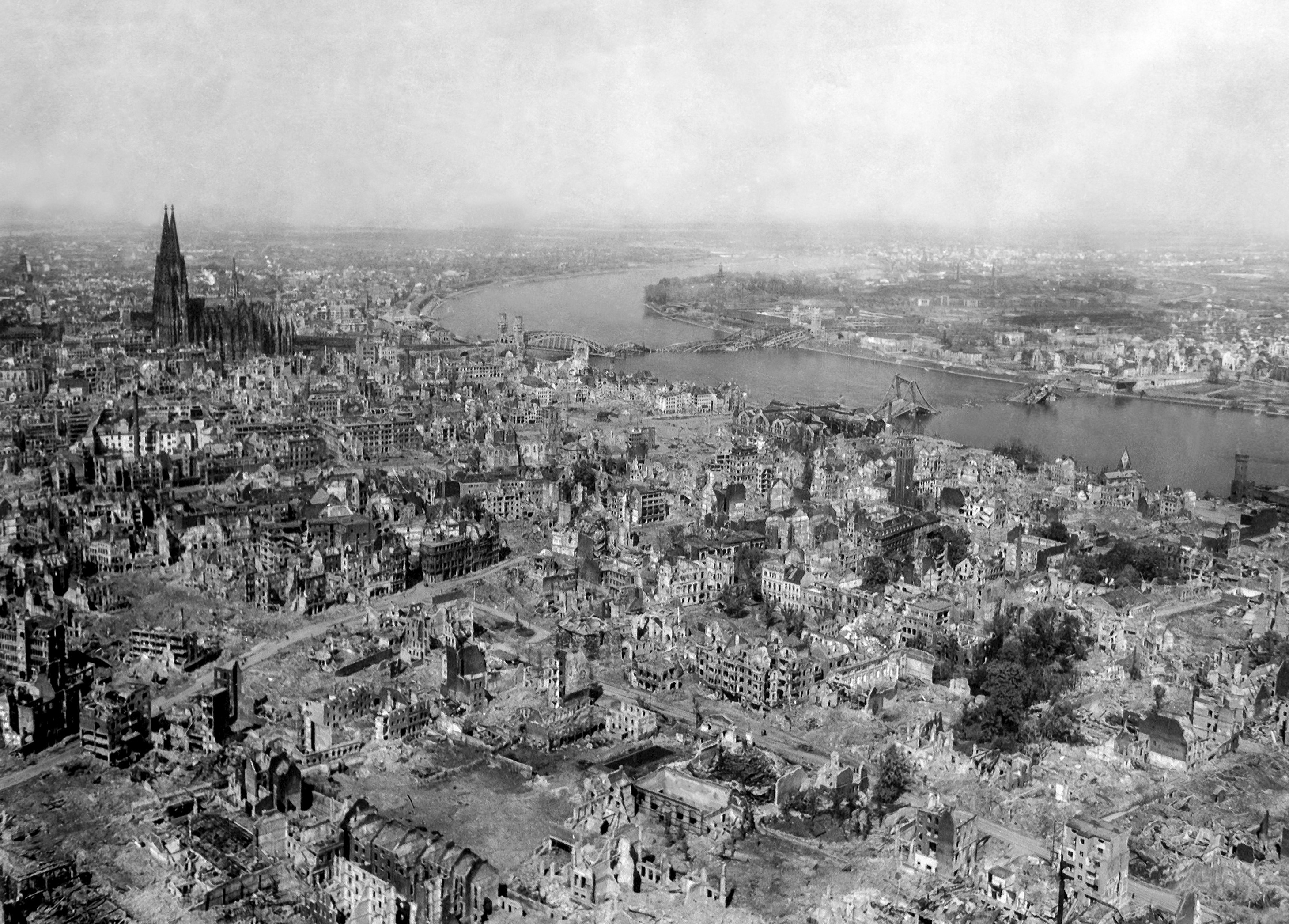
Cologne after it was captured by the Allies

Bradley launched Lumberjack on 1 March. In the north, the First Army rapidly exploited bridgeheads over the Erft River, entering Euskirchen on 4 March and Cologne on the fifth. Cologne was in U.S. Army control by the seventh. The First Army then pushed towards the Ahr River valley, the likely point of retreat for what was left of the German Army's LXVI and LXVII Korps.

The U.S. Third Army met some resistance along the Siegfried Line and the Prüm and Kyll Rivers. On 4 March at Bitburg, the 5th Infantry Division cut through the German lines. Taking advantage of the breach, the Fourth Armored Division struck out on a 45 miles (72 km) drive to the Rhine in less than five days. While losing only 100 casualties, they cost the Germans 5,700 killed and wounded. The Fourth Armored barely missed the chance to capture a bridge at Urmitz.

While moving towards the Ahr, the U.S. 9th Armored Division on the right flank of the First Army had moved swiftly towards the Rhine. The closer the division got to the Rhine, the more quickly it advanced. The speed of their movement towards the Rhine surprised the Germans. About 20 kilometres (12 mi) upstream from Bonn, they unexpectedly found the Ludendorff railroad bridge still standing.

By March 7, the Allies captured the part of Cologne on the west side of the Rhine river. The German army kept control of the eastern neighborhoods until the middle of April 1945.

=== Battle of Remagen ===
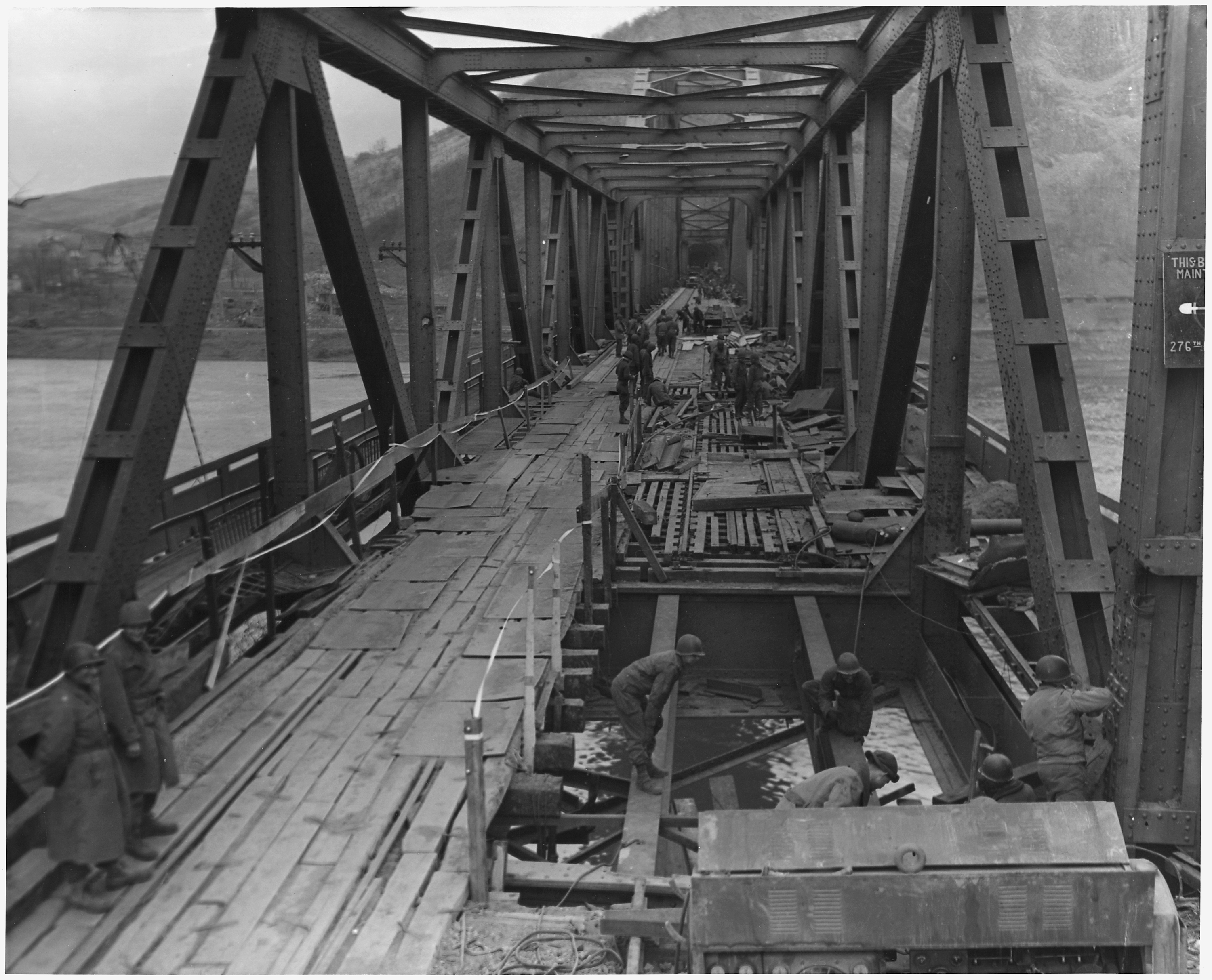
The Ludendorff Bridge (German: Ludendorffbrücke) four hours before it collapsed, ten days after it was captured by the Allies

During Operation Lumberjack, on 7 March 1945, when troops of the U.S. Army's 9th Armored Division Combat Command B, 9th Armored Engineer Battalion reached the river, they were very surprised to see that the railroad bridge was still standing. It was the only damaged but usable bridge over the Rhine. U.S. forces were able to capture the bridge. The Rhine was the last natural line of defense that the Germans hoped could be used to substantially resist the Western Allied advance. Up to then, crossings had been limited to small infantry reconnaissance patrols by boat.

When word that the bridge was still standing reached General William Hoge, commander of Combat Command B, he ordered the 27th Armored Infantry Battalion to advance into Remagen with support from the 14th Tank Battalion. After German demolition charges failed to destroy the bridge, the U.S. troops captured the bridge and in the next ten days 25,000 men comprising six divisions established a wide beachhead on the eastern side of the Rhine.

=== Impact on war plans ===
The capture of the bridge convinced the Allied high command in Western Europe that they could envelop the German industrial area of the Ruhr as opposed to focusing primarily on General Bernard Montgomery's plan, Operation Plunder, which would bring the British 21st Army Group across the Rhine into northern Germany.

The unexpected availability of the first major crossing of the Rhine, Germany's last major natural barrier and line of defense, caused Allied high commander Dwight Eisenhower to alter his plans to end the war. U.S. forces were able quickly to establish a bridgehead on the eastern side of the Rhine and to get forces into Germany. This allowed the U.S. forces to envelop the German industrial area of the Ruhr. The Allies were able to get six divisions across the Rhine before the Ludendorff Bridge collapsed ten days after it was captured on 17 March. Twenty-five soldiers were killed or went missing and three died later from injuries; 63 others were injured. Before it collapsed, five U.S. divisions had already used it and two adjacent tactical bridges to cross into Germany, creating a well-established bridgehead almost 40 kilometers (25 mi) long, extending from Bonn in the north almost to Koblenz in the south, and 10 to 15 kilometers (6.2 to 9.3 mi) deep.

The bridge was not rebuilt after the war. However, the bridge towers remain and in 1980 a peace museum was opened to the public.

== Aftermath ==
Operation Lumberjack succeeded in clearing the Rhine north of Mosel of effective German forces. The Allies destroyed four corps of the German 15th and 7th Armies. The capture of the bridge at Remagen was an unexpected bonus that advanced the timetable for crossing the Rhine. Patton and Bradley were able to move up their scheduled crossings of the Rhine.

General Albert Kesselring described the battle as the "Crime of Remagen. It broke the front along the Rhine." Hermann Göring said that the capture of the bridge "made a long defense impossible." Major General Carl Wagener, chief of staff to Field Marshal Walter Model, said that capturing the bridge signaled the end of the war for the Germans:

The Remagen affair caused a great stir in the German Supreme Command. Remagen should have been considered a basis for termination of the war. Remagen created a dangerous and unpleasant abscess within the last German defenses, and it provided an ideal springboard for the coming offensive east of the Rhine. The Remagen bridgehead made the other crossing of the Rhine a much easier task for the enemy. Furthermore, it tired German forces which should have been resting to withstand the next major assault.

== In popular culture ==
The battle was depicted in the novel The Bridge at Remagen by Ken Hechler, which was later adapted into the film of the same name.

The battle acts as the finale of the video game Call of Duty: WWII, titled “The Rhine”, which is set on the first day of the battle.

== See also ==
- Operation Veritable
- Operation Grenade
- Operation Undertone
- Remagen

== Other sources ==
- Charles MacDonald, The Last Offensive, Washington: GPO, 1973.
- Georg Tessin, Verbände und Truppen der deutschen Wehrmacht and Waffen-SS 1939 - 1945, Volume 2, Osnabrück:Biblio Verlag, 1973.
- Georg Tessin, Verbände und Truppen der deutschen Wehrmacht and Waffen-SS 1939 - 1945, Volume 4, Osnabrück:Biblio Verlag, 1975.
