= List of German corps in World War II =

List of German corps in World War II

This is a list of German Army corps that existed during World War II.

== Army (Heer) ==
=== Infantry corps ===
==== I–IX ====
- I Army Corps
- II Army Corps
- III Army Corps
- IV Army Corps
- V Army Corps
- VI Army Corps
- VII Army Corps
- VIII Army Corps
- IX Army Corps

==== X–XIX ====
- X Army Corps
- XI Army Corps
- XII Army Corps
- XIII Army Corps
- XIV Army Corps
- XV Army Corps
- XVI Army Corps
- XVII Army Corps
- XVIII Army Corps
- XIX Army Corps

==== XX–XXIX ====
- XX Army Corps
- XXI Army Corps
- XXII Army Corps
- XXIII Army Corps
- XXIV Army Corps
- XXV Army Corps
- XXVI Army Corps
- XXVII Army Corps
- XXVIII Army Corps
- XXIX Army Corps

==== XXX–XXXIX ====
- XXX Army Corps
- XXXI Army Corps
- XXXII Army Corps
- XXXIII Army Corps
- XXXIV Army Corps
- XXXV Army Corps
- XXXVI Army Corps
- XXXVIII Army Corps
- XXXIX Army Corps

==== XXXX–XXXXIX ====
- XXXX Army Corps
- XXXXI Army Corps
- XXXXII Army Corps
- XXXXIII Army Corps
- XXXXIV Army Corps
- XXXXVI Army Corps
- XXXXVII Army Corps
- XXXXVIII Army Corps

==== L–LIX ====
- L Army Corps
- LI Army Corps
- LII Army Corps
- LIII Army Corps
- LIV Army Corps
- LV Army Corps
- LVI Army Corps
- LVII Army Corps
- LIX Army Corps

==== LX–LXIX ====
- LXII Army Corps
- LXIII Army Corps
- LXIV Army Corps
- LXV Army Corps
- LXVI Army Corps
- LXVII Army Corps
- LXVIII Army Corps
- LXIX Army Corps

==== LXX–LXXIX ====
- LXX Army Corps
- LXXI Army Corps
- LXXII Army Corps
- LXXIII Army Corps
- LXXIV Army Corps
- LXXV Army Corps
- LXXVI Army Corps
- LXXVIII Army Corps

==== LXXX–LXXXIX ====
- LXXX Army Corps
- LXXXI Army Corps
- LXXXII Army Corps
- LXXXIII Army Corps
- LXXXIV Army Corps
- LXXXV Army Corps
- LXXXVI Army Corps
- LXXXVII Army Corps
- LXXXVIII Army Corps
- LXXXIX Army Corps

==== LXXXX–CI ====
- XC Army Corps
- XCI Army Corps
- XCVII Army Corps
- CI Army Corps

=== Motorised corps ===
- III Motorised Corps
- XIV Motorised Corps
- XV Motorised Corps
- XVI Motorised Corps
- XIX Motorised Corps
- XXII Motorised Corps
- XXXIX Motorised Corps
- XXXX Motorised Corps
- XXXXI Motorised Corps
- XXXXVI Motorised Corps
- XXXXVII Motorised Corps
- XXXXVIII Motorised Corps
- LVI Motorised Corps
- LVII Motorised Corps

=== Panzer corps ===
- III Panzer Corps
- IV Panzer Corps
- VII Panzer Corps
- XIV Panzer Corps
- XIX Panzer Corps
- XXIV Panzer Corps
- XXXVIII Panzer Corps
- XXXIX Panzer Corps
- XL Panzer Corps
- XXXXI Panzer Corps
- XLVI Panzer Corps
- XLVII Panzer Corps
- XXXXVIII Panzer Corps
- LVI Panzer Corps
- LVII Panzer Corps
- LVIII Panzer Corps
- LXXVI Panzer Corps
- Panzer Corps Feldherrnhalle
- Panzer Corps Großdeutschland

=== Mountain corps ===
- XV Mountain Corps
- XVIII Mountain Corps
- XIX Mountain Corps
- XXI Mountain Corps
- XXII Mountain Corps
- XXXVI Mountain Corps
- XXXXIX Mountain Corps
- LI Mountain Corps
- Norwegen Mountain Corps

=== Reserve corps ===
- LXI Reserve Corps
- LXII Reserve Corps
- LXIV Reserve Corps
- LXVI Reserve Corps
- LXVII Reserve Corps
- LXIX Reserve Corps

=== Miscellaneous corps ===
- Afrika Korps
- I Cavalry Corps
- I Military Police Corps
- II Military Police Corps
- III Military Police Corps

=== Höheres Kommando z.b.V. ===
- Höheres Kommando z.b.V. XXXI
- Höheres Kommando z.b.V. XXXII
- Höheres Kommando z.b.V. XXXIII
- Höheres Kommando z.b.V. XXXIV
- Höheres Kommando z.b.V. XXXV
- Höheres Kommando z.b.V. XXXVI
- Höheres Kommando z.b.V. XXXVII
- Höheres Kommando z.b.V. XXXXV
- Höheres Kommando z.b.V. LIX
- Höheres Kommando z.b.V. LX
- Höheres Kommando z.b.V. LXV
- Höheres Kommando z.b.V. LXX
- Höheres Kommando z.b.V. LXXI

== Waffen-SS (Schutzstaffel) ==
=== SS infantry corps ===
- VI SS Corps
- X SS Corps
- XI SS Corps
- XII SS Corps
- XIII SS Corps
- XIV SS Corps
- XVI SS Corps
- XVIII SS Corps

=== SS Panzer corps ===
- I SS Panzer Corps
- II SS Panzer Corps
- III (Germanic) SS Panzer Corps
- IV SS Panzer Corps
- VII SS Panzer Corps

=== SS miscellaneous corps ===
- SS Medical Corps
- V SS Mountain Corps
- VIII SS Cavalry Corps – planned in 1945 but not formed
- IX SS Mountain Corps
- XV SS Cossack Cavalry Corps
- XVII Waffen Corps of the SS (Hungarian)

== Luftwaffe ==
=== Fliegerkorps (air corps) ===
- I Fliegerkorps
- II Fliegerkorps
- III Fliegerkorps
- IV Fliegerkorps
- V Fliegerkorps
- VI Fliegerkorps
- VII Fliegerkorps
- VIII Fliegerkorps
- IX Fliegerkorps
- X Fliegerkorps
- XI Fliegerkorps
- XII Fliegerkorps
- XIII Fliegerkorps
- XIV Fliegerkorps
- Fliegerkorps Tunis

=== Jagdkorps ===
- I Jagdkorps
- II Jagdkorps

=== Flak corps ===
- I Flak Corps
- II Flak Corps
- III Flak Corps
- IV Flak Corps
- V Flak Corps
- VI Flak Corps

=== Parachute (Fallschirmjäger) corps ===
- I Parachute Corps
- II Parachute Corps
- Fallschirm-Panzerkorps Hermann Göring

=== Field corps ===
- I Luftwaffe Field Corps
- II Luftwaffe Field Corps
- III Luftwaffe Field Corps
- IV Luftwaffe Field Corps

== See also ==
- List of German divisions in World War II
- List of German brigades in World War II
- List of World War II military units of Germany
