= LXXXVIII Army Corps =

Military formation of the Wehrmacht

The LXXXVIII Army Corps (German: LXXXVIII. Armeekorps) was an army corps of the German Wehrmacht during World War II. It was formed in 1942 and existed until 1945.

== History ==
The LXXXVIII Army Corps was formed on 8 June 1942 using personnel from the 240th Division. That staff had already effectively been a corps, as it had overseen the 82nd, 167th and 719th Divisions between April and June 1942. The initial corps commander of the LXXXVIII Army Corps was Hans-Wolfgang Reinhard.

Between June 1942 and July 1944, the commanding officer of the LXXXVIII Army Corps was also the commander of army troops in the Netherlands and staff for coastal defense of Wehrmacht commander Netherlands (German: Befehlshaber der Truppen des Heeres in den Niederlanden und Stab Küstenverteidigung des Wehrmachtbefehlshabers Niederlande), but was merely responsible for the corps itself after that.

== Structure ==
Organizational chart of the LXXXVIII (88th) Army Corps
Year	Date	Subordinate units	Army	Army Group	Operational area
1942	July	Various minor units: Army Coastal Artillery Detachment 758 [since 15 July 1942], later Army Coastal Artillery Detachment 1230.; Army Coastal Artillery Detachment 759 [since 15 July 1942], later Army Coastal Artillery Detachment 1231.; Fast Detachment 509 [since 26 June 1944].	None	Army Group D	Netherlands (Utrecht)
1942	August	Various minor units: Army Coastal Artillery Detachment 758 [since 15 July 1942], later Army Coastal Artillery Detachment 1230.; Army Coastal Artillery Detachment 759 [since 15 July 1942], later Army Coastal Artillery Detachment 1231.; Fast Detachment 509 [since 26 June 1944].	None	Army Group D	Netherlands (Utrecht)
1942	September	Various minor units: Army Coastal Artillery Detachment 758 [since 15 July 1942], later Army Coastal Artillery Detachment 1230.; Army Coastal Artillery Detachment 759 [since 15 July 1942], later Army Coastal Artillery Detachment 1231.; Fast Detachment 509 [since 26 June 1944].	None	Army Group D	Netherlands (Utrecht)
1942	October	Various minor units: Army Coastal Artillery Detachment 758 [since 15 July 1942], later Army Coastal Artillery Detachment 1230.; Army Coastal Artillery Detachment 759 [since 15 July 1942], later Army Coastal Artillery Detachment 1231.; Fast Detachment 509 [since 26 June 1944].	None	Army Group D	Netherlands (Utrecht)
1942	November	Various minor units: Army Coastal Artillery Detachment 758 [since 15 July 1942], later Army Coastal Artillery Detachment 1230.; Army Coastal Artillery Detachment 759 [since 15 July 1942], later Army Coastal Artillery Detachment 1231.; Fast Detachment 509 [since 26 June 1944].	None	Army Group D	Netherlands (Utrecht)
1942	December	Various minor units: Army Coastal Artillery Detachment 758 [since 15 July 1942], later Army Coastal Artillery Detachment 1230.; Army Coastal Artillery Detachment 759 [since 15 July 1942], later Army Coastal Artillery Detachment 1231.; Fast Detachment 509 [since 26 June 1944].	None	Army Group D	Netherlands (Utrecht)
1943	January	Various minor units: Army Coastal Artillery Detachment 758 [since 15 July 1942], later Army Coastal Artillery Detachment 1230.; Army Coastal Artillery Detachment 759 [since 15 July 1942], later Army Coastal Artillery Detachment 1231.; Fast Detachment 509 [since 26 June 1944].	None	Army Group D	Netherlands (Utrecht)
1943	February	Various minor units: Army Coastal Artillery Detachment 758 [since 15 July 1942], later Army Coastal Artillery Detachment 1230.; Army Coastal Artillery Detachment 759 [since 15 July 1942], later Army Coastal Artillery Detachment 1231.; Fast Detachment 509 [since 26 June 1944].	None	Army Group D	Netherlands (Utrecht)
1943	March	Various minor units: Army Coastal Artillery Detachment 758 [since 15 July 1942], later Army Coastal Artillery Detachment 1230.; Army Coastal Artillery Detachment 759 [since 15 July 1942], later Army Coastal Artillery Detachment 1231.; Fast Detachment 509 [since 26 June 1944].	None	Army Group D	Netherlands (Utrecht)
1943	April	Various minor units: Army Coastal Artillery Detachment 758 [since 15 July 1942], later Army Coastal Artillery Detachment 1230.; Army Coastal Artillery Detachment 759 [since 15 July 1942], later Army Coastal Artillery Detachment 1231.; Fast Detachment 509 [since 26 June 1944].	None	Army Group D	Netherlands (Utrecht)
1943	May	Various minor units: Army Coastal Artillery Detachment 758 [since 15 July 1942], later Army Coastal Artillery Detachment 1230.; Army Coastal Artillery Detachment 759 [since 15 July 1942], later Army Coastal Artillery Detachment 1231.; Fast Detachment 509 [since 26 June 1944].	None	Army Group D	Netherlands (Utrecht)
1943	June	Various minor units: Army Coastal Artillery Detachment 758 [since 15 July 1942], later Army Coastal Artillery Detachment 1230.; Army Coastal Artillery Detachment 759 [since 15 July 1942], later Army Coastal Artillery Detachment 1231.; Fast Detachment 509 [since 26 June 1944].	Wehrmachtbefehlshaber Niederlande	Army Group D	Netherlands (Utrecht)
1943	July	Various minor units: Army Coastal Artillery Detachment 758 [since 15 July 1942], later Army Coastal Artillery Detachment 1230.; Army Coastal Artillery Detachment 759 [since 15 July 1942], later Army Coastal Artillery Detachment 1231.; Fast Detachment 509 [since 26 June 1944].	Wehrmachtbefehlshaber Niederlande	Army Group D	Netherlands (Utrecht)
1943	August	Various minor units: Army Coastal Artillery Detachment 758 [since 15 July 1942], later Army Coastal Artillery Detachment 1230.; Army Coastal Artillery Detachment 759 [since 15 July 1942], later Army Coastal Artillery Detachment 1231.; Fast Detachment 509 [since 26 June 1944].	Wehrmachtbefehlshaber Niederlande	Army Group D	Netherlands (Utrecht)
1943	September	Various minor units: Army Coastal Artillery Detachment 758 [since 15 July 1942], later Army Coastal Artillery Detachment 1230.; Army Coastal Artillery Detachment 759 [since 15 July 1942], later Army Coastal Artillery Detachment 1231.; Fast Detachment 509 [since 26 June 1944].	Wehrmachtbefehlshaber Niederlande	Army Group D	Netherlands (Utrecht)
1943	October	Various minor units: Army Coastal Artillery Detachment 758 [since 15 July 1942], later Army Coastal Artillery Detachment 1230.; Army Coastal Artillery Detachment 759 [since 15 July 1942], later Army Coastal Artillery Detachment 1231.; Fast Detachment 509 [since 26 June 1944].	Wehrmachtbefehlshaber Niederlande	Army Group D	Netherlands (Utrecht)
1943	November	Various minor units: Army Coastal Artillery Detachment 758 [since 15 July 1942], later Army Coastal Artillery Detachment 1230.; Army Coastal Artillery Detachment 759 [since 15 July 1942], later Army Coastal Artillery Detachment 1231.; Fast Detachment 509 [since 26 June 1944].	Wehrmachtbefehlshaber Niederlande	Army Group D	Netherlands (Utrecht)
1943	December	Various minor units: Army Coastal Artillery Detachment 758 [since 15 July 1942], later Army Coastal Artillery Detachment 1230.; Army Coastal Artillery Detachment 759 [since 15 July 1942], later Army Coastal Artillery Detachment 1231.; Fast Detachment 509 [since 26 June 1944].	Wehrmachtbefehlshaber Niederlande	Army Group D	Netherlands (Utrecht)
1944	January	Various minor units: Army Coastal Artillery Detachment 758 [since 15 July 1942], later Army Coastal Artillery Detachment 1230.; Army Coastal Artillery Detachment 759 [since 15 July 1942], later Army Coastal Artillery Detachment 1231.; Fast Detachment 509 [since 26 June 1944].	Wehrmachtbefehlshaber Niederlande	Army Group D	Netherlands (Utrecht)
1944	February	Various minor units: Army Coastal Artillery Detachment 758 [since 15 July 1942], later Army Coastal Artillery Detachment 1230.; Army Coastal Artillery Detachment 759 [since 15 July 1942], later Army Coastal Artillery Detachment 1231.; Fast Detachment 509 [since 26 June 1944].	Wehrmachtbefehlshaber Niederlande	Army Group D	Netherlands (Utrecht)
1944	March	Various minor units: Army Coastal Artillery Detachment 758 [since 15 July 1942], later Army Coastal Artillery Detachment 1230.; Army Coastal Artillery Detachment 759 [since 15 July 1942], later Army Coastal Artillery Detachment 1231.; Fast Detachment 509 [since 26 June 1944].	Wehrmachtbefehlshaber Niederlande	Army Group D	Netherlands (Utrecht)
1944	April	Various minor units: Army Coastal Artillery Detachment 758 [since 15 July 1942], later Army Coastal Artillery Detachment 1230.; Army Coastal Artillery Detachment 759 [since 15 July 1942], later Army Coastal Artillery Detachment 1231.; Fast Detachment 509 [since 26 June 1944].	Wehrmachtbefehlshaber Niederlande	Army Group D	Netherlands (Utrecht)
1944	May	Various minor units: Army Coastal Artillery Detachment 758 [since 15 July 1942], later Army Coastal Artillery Detachment 1230.; Army Coastal Artillery Detachment 759 [since 15 July 1942], later Army Coastal Artillery Detachment 1231.; Fast Detachment 509 [since 26 June 1944].	Wehrmachtbefehlshaber Niederlande	Army Group B	Netherlands (Utrecht)
1944	June	Various minor units: Army Coastal Artillery Detachment 758 [since 15 July 1942], later Army Coastal Artillery Detachment 1230.; Army Coastal Artillery Detachment 759 [since 15 July 1942], later Army Coastal Artillery Detachment 1231.; Fast Detachment 509 [since 26 June 1944].	Wehrmachtbefehlshaber Niederlande	Army Group B	Netherlands (Utrecht)
1944	July	Various minor units: Army Coastal Artillery Detachment 758 [since 15 July 1942], later Army Coastal Artillery Detachment 1230.; Army Coastal Artillery Detachment 759 [since 15 July 1942], later Army Coastal Artillery Detachment 1231.; Fast Detachment 509 [since 26 June 1944].	Wehrmachtbefehlshaber Niederlande	Army Group B	Netherlands (Utrecht)
1944	August	Various minor units: Army Coastal Artillery Detachment 758 [since 15 July 1942], later Army Coastal Artillery Detachment 1230.; Army Coastal Artillery Detachment 759 [since 15 July 1942], later Army Coastal Artillery Detachment 1231.; Fast Detachment 509 [since 26 June 1944].	Wehrmachtbefehlshaber Niederlande	Army Group B	Netherlands (Utrecht)
1944	16 September	6th Parachute, 84th Infantry, 85th Infantry, 89th Infantry, 176th Infantry, 179th Infantry, 353rd Infantry	1st Parachute Army	Army Group B	Arnhem
1944	13 October	59th Infantry, 245th Infantry	15th Army	Army Group B	Netherlands
1944	5 November	59th Infantry, 256th Infantry, 712th Infantry	15th Army	Army Group B	Netherlands
1944	26 November	6th Parachute, 711th Infantry, 712th Infantry	15th Army	Army Group H	Netherlands
1944	31 December	2nd Parachute, 6th Parachute	25th Army	Army Group H	Netherlands
1945	19 February	2nd Parachute, 331st Infantry	25th Army	Army Group H	Netherlands
1945	1 March	2nd Parachute, 331st Infantry	25th Army	Army Group H	Netherlands
1945	12 April	6th Parachute, 149th Infantry, 346th Infantry, 361st Infantry	25th Army	Oberbefehlshaber Nordwest	Netherlands

== Noteworthy individuals ==
- Hans-Wolfgang Reinhard, corps commander of the LXXXVIII Army Corps (1 July 1942 – 21 December 1944).
- Felix Schwalbe, corps commander of the LXXXVIII Army Corps (21 December 1944 – 3 April 1945).
- Johann Wolpert, corps commander of the LXXXVIII Army Corps (3 April 1945 – May 1945).
