= LXVII Army Corps =

World War II German Wehrmacht army corps

The LXVII Army Corps (German: LXVII. Armeekorps), initially known as the LXVII Reserve Corps (German: LXVII. Reservekorps), was an army corps of the German Wehrmacht during World War II. The corps was formed in September 1942.

== History ==
The LXVII Reserve Corps was formed on 24 September 1942 in Wehrkreis II. Its initial purpose was to oversee and lead reserve divisions of Oberbefehlshaber West (Army Group D). In this, the LXVII Reserve Corps was similar to the LXVI Reserve Corps, which had been formed three days earlier, on 21 September. The initial corps commander of the LXVII Reserve Corps was Walther Fischer von Weikersthal.

On 20 January 1944, the LXVII Reserve Corps was renamed to become the LXVII Army Corps. It was subsequently activated for normal combat purposes and would serve, in order, under the 15th Army between February 1944 and November 1944, under the 1st Parachute Army in December 1944, under the 15th Army in January 1945, under the 5th Panzer Army between February 1945 and March 1945, and under the 11th Army in April 1945.

== Structure ==
Organizational structure of the LXVII (67th) Reserve Corps and the LXVII (67th) Army Corps of the German Wehrmacht, 1942 – 1945
Year	Date	Commander	Subordinate Divisions	Army	Army Group	Operational area
1942	October	von Weikersthal	Various	directly under army group	Army Group D	Brussels
1942	November	von Weikersthal	Various	directly under army group	Army Group D	Brussels
1942	December	von Weikersthal	Various	directly under army group	Army Group D	Brussels
1943	January	von Weikersthal	Various	directly under army group	Army Group D	Brussels
1943	February	von Weikersthal	Various	directly under army group	Army Group D	Brussels
1943	March	von Weikersthal	Various	directly under army group	Army Group D	Brussels
1943	April	von Weikersthal	Various	directly under army group	Army Group D	Brussels
1943	May	von Weikersthal	Various	directly under army group	Army Group D	Brussels
1943	June	von Weikersthal	Various	directly under army group	Army Group D	Brussels
1943	July	von Weikersthal	Various	directly under army group	Army Group D	Brussels
1943	August	von Weikersthal	Various	directly under army group	Army Group D	Brussels
1943	September	von Weikersthal	Various	directly under army group	Army Group D	Brussels
1943	October	von Weikersthal	Various	directly under army group	Army Group D	Brussels
1943	November	von Weikersthal	Various	directly under army group	Army Group D	Brussels
1943	December	von Weikersthal	Various	directly under army group	Army Group D	Brussels
1944	January	von Weikersthal	Various	directly under army group	Army Group D	Brussels
1944	12 February	von Weikersthal	344th Infantry, 348th Infantry	15th Army	Army Group D	Amiens
1944	11 March	von Weikersthal	85th Infantry, 344th Infantry, 348th Infantry	15th Army	Army Group D	Amiens
1944	8 April	von Weikersthal	344th Infantry, 348th Infantry	15th Army	Army Group D	Amiens
1944	11 May	von Weikersthal	344th Infantry, 348th Infantry	15th Army	Army Group B	Amiens, Breda
1944	12 June	Sponheimer	344th Infantry, 348th Infantry	15th Army	Army Group B	Amiens, Breda
1944	17 July	Sponheimer	344th Infantry, 348th Infantry	15th Army	Army Group B	Amiens, Breda
1944	31 August	Sponheimer	17th LFD, 226th Infantry, 245th Infantry	15th Army	Army Group B	Amiens, Breda
1944	16 September	Sponheimer	17th LFD, 331st Infantry, 344th Infantry, 346th Infantry, 711th Infantry	15th Army	Army Group B	Amiens, Breda
1944	13 October	Sponheimer	64th Infantry, 70th Infantry, 85th Infantry, 346th Infantry, 711th Infantry, 719th Infantry	15th Army	Army Group B	Amiens, Breda
1944	5 November	Sponheimer	85th Infantry, 245th Infantry, 346th Infantry, 711th Infantry, 719th Infantry	15th Army	Army Group B	Amiens, Breda
1944	26 November	Sponheimer	363rd Infantry	1st Parachute Army	Army Group H	Breda
1944	31 December	Hitzfeld	3rd Parachute, 89th Infantry, 246th Infantry, 277th Infantry	15th Army	Army Group B	Aachen
1945	19 February	Hitzfeld	26th Infantry, 89th Infantry, 277th Infantry	5th Panzer Army	Army Group B	Rur
1945	1 March	Hitzfeld	89th Infantry, 277th Infantry	5th Panzer Army	Army Group B	Rur
1945	12 April	Hitzfeld	Kgr Feller, Kgr Ettner, Kgr Heidenreich, Kgr Großkreuz	11th Army	Army Group D	Kassel, Harz

== Noteworthy individuals ==
- Walther Fischer von Weikersthal, corps commander of LXVII Reserve Corps and LXVII Army Corps (25 September 1942 – 7 June 1944).
- Otto Sponheimer, corps commander of LXVII Army Corps (7 June 1944 – 16 December 1944).
- Felix Schwalbe, corps commander of LXVII Army Corps (16 December 1944 – 21 December 1944).
- Otto Hitzfeld, corps commander of LXVII Army Corps (21 December 1944 – 5 May 1945).
