= LXXXI Army Corps =

WW2 German military unit in the West

The LXXXI Army Corps (German: LXXXI. Armeekorps) was an army corps of the German Wehrmacht during World War II. The corps was established in occupied France in 1942 and remained active until 1945.

== History ==
The LXXXI Army Corps was established in occupied France on 28 May 1942 from the renamed Höheres Kommando z. b. V. XXXII. In turn, the Higher Command XXXII, not to be confused with the XXXII Army Corps, had been established on 15 October 1939 from the Grenzschutz-Abschnittkommando 2. The initial commander of the LXXXI Army Corps was Adolf-Friedrich Kuntzen.

The LXXXI Army Corps, initially headquartered at Rouen, was originally subordinate to the 15th Army under Army Group D between June 1942 and July 1944. It was then moved to the 5th Panzer Army in August 1944, to the 7th Army between September and October 1944, and to the 5th Panzer Army between November and December 1944. It was moved back to the 15th Army in early 1945.

On 5 March 1945, Gauleiter of Cologne-Aachen Josef Grohé demanded from LXXXI Army Corps commander Friedrich Köchling to defend the city of Cologne at all costs; Köchling refused.

LXXXI Army Corps surrendered in the Ruhr Pocket.

== Structure ==
Organizational chart of the LXXXI (81st) Wehrmacht Army Corps
Year	Date	Subordinate units	Army	Army Group	Operational area
1942	8 June	10th Panzer, 302nd Infantry, 332nd Infantry, 711th Infantry	15th Army	Army Group D	Northern France (Rouen)
1942	4 July	302nd Infantry, 332nd Infantry, 711th Infantry	15th Army	Army Group D	Northern France (Rouen)
1942	5 August	302nd Infantry, 332nd Infantry, 711th Infantry	15th Army	Army Group D	Northern France (Rouen)
1942	2 September	10th Panzer, 302nd Infantry, 332nd Infantry, 711th Infantry	15th Army	Army Group D	Northern France (Rouen)
1942	8 October	10th Panzer, 302nd Infantry, 332nd Infantry, 711th Infantry	15th Army	Army Group D	Northern France (Rouen)
1942	5 November	302nd Infantry, 332nd Infantry, 348th Infantry, 711th Infantry	15th Army	Army Group D	Northern France (Rouen)
1942	1 December	332nd Infantry, 348th Infantry, 711th Infantry	15th Army	Army Group D	Northern France (Rouen)
1943	1 January	332nd Infantry, 348th Infantry, 711th Infantry	15th Army	Army Group D	Northern France (Rouen)
1943	3 February	332nd Infantry, 348th Infantry, 711th Infantry	15th Army	Army Group D	Northern France (Rouen)
1943	4 March	191st Infantry, 348th Infantry, 711th Infantry, 17th LFD	15th Army	Army Group D	Northern France (Rouen)
1943	9 April	348th Infantry, 711th Infantry, 17th LFD	15th Army	Army Group D	Northern France (Rouen)
1943	1 May	348th Infantry, 711th Infantry, 17th LFD	15th Army	Army Group D	Northern France (Rouen)
1943	1 June	348th Infantry, 711th Infantry, 17th LFD	15th Army	Army Group D	Northern France (Rouen)
1943	7 July	348th Infantry, 711th Infantry, 17th LFD	15th Army	Army Group D	Northern France (Rouen)
1943	5 August	348th Infantry, 711th Infantry, 17th LFD	15th Army	Army Group D	Northern France (Rouen)
1943	5 September	348th Infantry, 711th Infantry, 17th LFD	15th Army	Army Group D	Northern France (Rouen)
1943	4 October	348th Infantry, 711th Infantry, 17th LFD	15th Army	Army Group D	Northern France (Rouen)
1943	8 November	348th Infantry, 711th Infantry, 17th LFD	15th Army	Army Group D	Northern France (Rouen)
1943	3 December	348th Infantry, 711th Infantry, 17th LFD	15th Army	Army Group D	Northern France (Rouen)
1944	1 January	245th Infantry, 348th Infantry, 711th Infantry, 17th LFD	15th Army	Army Group D	Northern France (Rouen)
1944	12 February	245th Infantry, 711th Infantry, 17th LFD	15th Army	Army Group D	Northern France (Rouen)
1944	11 March	245th Infantry, 711th Infantry, 17th LFD	15th Army	Army Group D	Northern France (Rouen)
1944	8 April	245th Infantry, 711th Infantry, 17th LFD	15th Army	Army Group D	Northern France (Rouen)
1944	11 May	245th Infantry, 711th Infantry, 17th LFD	15th Army	Army Group B	Northern France (Rouen)
1944	12 June	245th Infantry, 346th Infantry, 711th Infantry, 17th LFD	15th Army	Army Group B	Northern France (Rouen)
1944	17 July	89th Infantry, 245th Infantry, 17th LFD	15th Army	Army Group B	Northern France (Rouen)
1944	31 August	49th Infantry, 85th Infantry, 353rd Infantry	5th Panzer Army	Army Group B	Normandy
1944	16 September	9th Panzer, 116th Panzer, Panzerbrigade 105, 49th Infantry	7th Army	Army Group B	Aachen
1944	13 October	12th Infantry, 246th Volksgrenadier	7th Army	Army Group B	Aachen
1944	5 November	3rd Infantry, 12th Infantry, 246th Volksgrenadier	5th Panzer Army	Army Group B	Aachen
1944	26 November	3rd Infantry, 12th Infantry, 47th Infantry, 340th Volksgrenadier	5th Panzer Army	Army Group B	Aachen
1944	31 December	47th Infantry, 353rd Infantry, 363rd Infantry	15th Army	Army Group B	Rur / Ruhr Pocket
1945	19 February	59th Infantry, 363rd Infantry	15th Army	Army Group B	Rur / Ruhr Pocket
1945	1 March	9th Panzer, 11th Panzer, 59th Infantry, 363rd Infantry, 476th Infantry	15th Army	Army Group B	Rur / Ruhr Pocket
1945	12 April	Panzerbrigade 106, Würtz, Scherzer	15th Army	Army Group B	Rur / Ruhr Pocket

== Noteworthy individuals ==
- Adolf-Friedrich Kuntzen, corps commander of LXXXI Army Corps (1 April 1942 – 7 September 1944).
- Friedrich-August Schack, corps commander of LXXXI Army Corps (7 September 1944 – 20 September 1944).
- Friedrich Köchling, corps commander of LXXXI Army Corps (20 September 1944 – 10 March 1945).
- Ernst-Günther Baade, corps commander of LXXXI Army Corps (10 March 1945 – May 1945).
- Otto Zeltmann, chief of the general staff of LXXXI Army Corps.
