= 245th Infantry Division (Wehrmacht) =

Military Unit

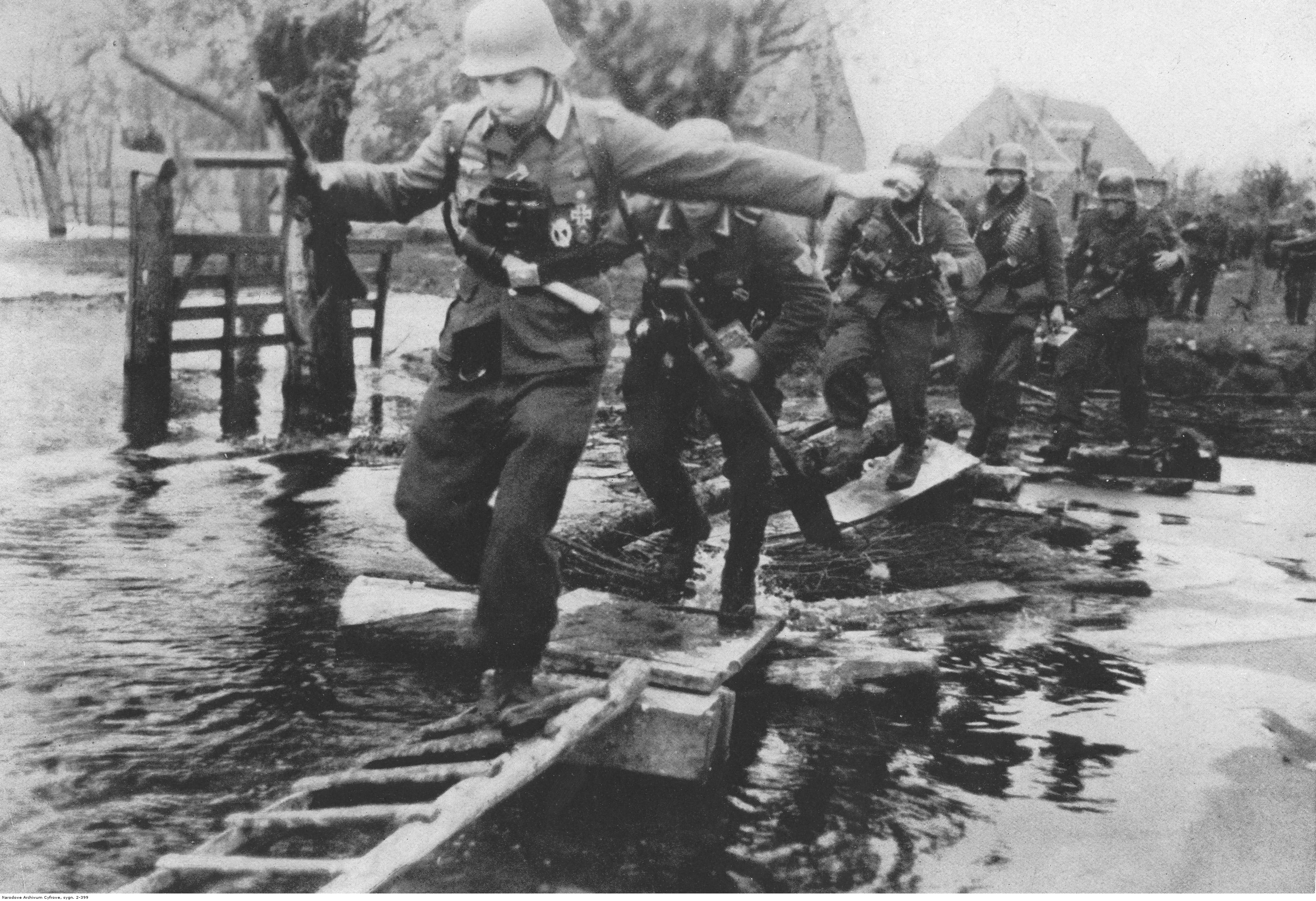
245th infantry division

The 245th Infantry Division (German: 245. Infanterie-Division) was an infantry division of the German Heer during World War II. It was active between 1943 and 1945.

== Operational history ==
The 245th Infantry Division was formed on 8 July 1943 as a static infantry division in the Rouen area in occupied France. It initially consisted of the Grenadier Regiments 935, 936 and 937, as well as the Artillery Regiment 245. The division's initial commander was Erwin Sander.

The division was in the Fécamp area during the beginning of the Allied Operation Overlord. While it did not fight the Allies immediately, it saw combat during the Allied drive into the Low Countries. In September 1944, it was in the Arnhem area Between 2 October and 8 November, the 245th Division fought in the Battle of the Scheldt. It was briefly withdrawn from the frontline to be reinforced, but returned to face U.S. 3rd Army forces before the end of the year 1944. It fought in northern Alsace in early 1945, and was once again sent to the reserves to be reinforced on 1 March 1945. It surrendered to British forces in the Schleswig-Holstein area.

=== Superior formations ===
At the corps level, the 245th Infantry Division served at times under LXXXI, LXVII, LXXXIX, LXXXVIII, LXXXVIII, and LXXXIX Army Corps. At the army level, the division served at times under 15th and 1st Armies. At the army group level, the division served at times under Army Group D, Army Group B and Army Group G.

The superior formations of the 245th Infantry Division
Year	Month	Army Corps	Army	Army Group	Operational Area
1943	October	None	None	Army Group D (von Rundstedt)	Rouen
1943	November – December	None	15th Army (von Vietinghoff, von Salmuth, von Zangen)	Army Group D (von Rundstedt)	Rouen
1944	January – April	LXXXI Army Corps	15th Army (von Vietinghoff, von Salmuth, von Zangen)	Army Group D (von Rundstedt)	Dieppe
1944	May – July	LXXXI Army Corps	15th Army (von Vietinghoff, von Salmuth, von Zangen)	Army Group B (Rommel, von Kluge, Model)	Dieppe
1944	August	LXVII Army Corps	15th Army (von Vietinghoff, von Salmuth, von Zangen)	Army Group B (Rommel, von Kluge, Model)	Belgium
1944	September	LXXXIX Army Corps	15th Army (von Vietinghoff, von Salmuth, von Zangen)	Army Group B (Rommel, von Kluge, Model)	Belgium
1944	October	LXXXVIII Army Corps	15th Army (von Vietinghoff, von Salmuth, von Zangen)	Army Group B (Rommel, von Kluge, Model)	Tilburg
1944	November	LXVII Army Corps	15th Army (von Vietinghoff, von Salmuth, von Zangen)	Army Group B (Rommel, von Kluge, Model)	Breda
1944	December	None	1st Army (von Obstfelder)	Army Group G (Blaskowitz, Hausser)	Saarpfalz
1945	January – February	LXXXIX Army Corps	1st Army (von Obstfelder)	Army Group G (Blaskowitz, Hausser)	Northern Alsace
1945	March	None	None	None	Lower Rhine
1945	April	II Parachute Corps (Meindl)	1st Parachute Army (Blumentritt, Student)	None	North Germany

== Noteworthy individuals ==
- Erwin Sander, divisional commander starting 8 September 1943.
- Kuno Dewitz, divisional commander starting 1 April 1945.
