= 353rd Infantry Division =

- Active: 5 November 1943 – 21 April 1945
- Country: Nazi Germany
- Branch: Heer
- Type: Infantry
- Engagements: World War II

The 353rd Infantry Division (German: 353. Infanterie-Division) was an infantry division of the German army during World War II.

== Operational history ==
The 353rd Infantry Division was assembled as an infantry division of the 21st deployment wave on 5 November 1943. The division was initially deployed under supervision of the German 7th Army, which also became the division's superior formation for most of its history. The 353rd Infantry Division was assembled from elements of the 328th Infantry Division, which had previously served with the 1st Panzer Army in southern Russia on the Eastern Front. There, the 328th Infantry Division had taken heavy casualties over the course of the year 1943, was subsequently downsized to the smaller "Division Group 328" before eventually being dissolved altogether.

The 353rd Infantry Division consisted initially of Grenadier Regiment 941, Grenadier Regiment 942, Grenadier Regiment 943, Division Fusilier Battalion 353, Artillery Regiment 353 and Division Units 353. Each of the grenadier regiments initially consisted of two battalions, bringing the division to a total strength of six grenadier battalions. The grenadier regiments from which the initial battalions were assembled were the Grenadier Regiments 548 and 569 (previously 328th Infantry Division), 754 and 755 (previously 334th Infantry Division), 581 (previously 306th Infantry Division) and 671 (previously 371st Infantry Division). The initial divisional commander was Paul Mahlmann.

After June 1944 (Operation Overlord), the 353rd Infantry Division was engaged on the newly reopened Western Front. In July, Mahlmann was replaced as divisional commander by Erich Müller. The division was trapped in the Falaise Pocket along with much of the 7th Army in August 1944. Here, it fought as part of the LXXXIV Army Corps (Dietrich von Choltitz), along with the 243rd and 275th Infantry Divisions, the 2nd SS Panzer and 17th SS Panzer Grenadier Divisions, the Panzer Lehr Division, the 5th Luftwaffe Field Division, and the 91st Air Landing Infantry Division. The division was briefly commanded by a colonel named Thieme in early August, before Paul Mahlmann returned to command later the same month. The division's remnants were refreshed near Trier in November 1944 through the addition of Luftwaffe Field Battalion XX, Battalion Garten, Replacement/Training Battalion 313, Security Battalion 547 and Landesschützen Battalion II./12 as a new Division Fusilier Battalion.

Between December 1944 and January 1945, the 353rd Infantry Division operated as part of the LXXXI Army Corps at the Westfall defensive fortifications (Allied parlance: "Siegfried Line"), where it launched a major counterattack on 2 December, which was eventually beaten back by U.S. artillery.

The 353rd Infantry Division was eventually trapped in the Ruhr Cauldron, where it went into American captivity around April 1945. The division's final commander was Colonel Kurt Hummel, who assumed command on 15 February 1945.

== Order of battle ==
Superior formations of 328th Infantry Division
Year	Month	Army Corps	Army	Army Group	Operational area
1943	Nov./Dec.	LXXIV Army Corps	7th Army	Army Group D	Brittany
1944	Jan./Feb.	LXXIV Army Corps	7th Army	Army Group D	Brittany
1944	Mar./Apr.	XXV Army Corps	7th Army	Army Group D	Brittany
1944	May	XXV Army Corps	7th Army	Army Group B	Brittany
1944	June	LXXIV Army Corps	7th Army	Army Group B	Brittany
1944	July	LXXXIV Army Corps	7th Army	Army Group B	Normandy
1944	August	LXXXI Army Corps	5th Panzer Army	Army Group B	Belgium
1944	Sept.	LXXXVIII Army Corps	1st Parachute Army	Army Group B	Maastricht
1944	Oct.	LXXX Army Corps	7th Army	Army Group B	Trier
1944	Nov./Dec.	LXXX Army Corps	7th Army	Army Group B	Trier
1945	Jan.	LXXXI Army Corps	15th Army	Army Group B	Düren
1945	Feb./Mar.	LVIII Army Corps	15th Army	Army Group B	Düren
1945	April	LVIII Army Corps	5th Panzer Army	Army Group B	Rhine/Ruhr
