= 348th Division =

348th Division may refer to:

- 348th Infantry Division, Wehrmacht, Germany
- 348th Rifle Division, Soviet Union

== See also ==
- List of military divisions by number
