= LXV Army Corps =

WW2 Army corps of the Wehrmacht

The LXV Army Corps for special deployment (German: LXV. Armeekorps z. b. V.) was an army corps of the German Wehrmacht during World War II. The corps was formed in November 1943. It was renamed Generalkommando z.b.V. XXX on 20 October 1944.

== History ==
LXV Army Corps was formed on 28 November 1943 for the purpose of the V-weapons program, initially specifically the V-1 flying bomb. The corps commander was Erich Heinemann between November 1943 and September 1944.

On 20 October 1944, the corps staff, then positioned near Bonn, was renamed to Generalkommando z. b. V. XXX for the purpose of military deception. The General Command XXX was initially subordinate to the 15th Army (Gustav-Adolf von Zangen), but was eventually moved to 25th Army (Günther Blumentritt, later Philipp Kleffel) in January 1945.
