= Gustav Höhne =

- Born: 17 February 1893; Kruschwitz, German Empire
- Died: 1 July 1951 (aged 58); Oberursel, West Germany
- Military career
- Allegiance: German Empire; Weimar Republic; Nazi Germany
- Branch: German Army
- Service years: 1911–1945
- Rank: General der Infanterie
- Commands: 8th Jäger Division; VIII Army Corps; LXXXIX Army Corps
- Conflicts: World War I; World War II; Occupation of Czechoslovakia; Invasion of Poland; Battle of Belgium; Battle of France; Operation Barbarossa; Battle of Białystok–Minsk; Battle of Smolensk (1941); Battle of Moscow; Siege of Leningrad; Lublin–Brest Offensive; Operation Nordwind
- Awards: Knight's Cross of the Iron Cross with Oak Leaves

Gustav Höhne (17 February 1893 – 1 July 1951) was a German general during World War II who held commands at the division and corps levels. He was a recipient of the Knight's Cross of the Iron Cross with Oak Leaves of Nazi Germany.

Höhne was born in Kruszwica (today, Kruszwica) in 1893. He joined the Royal Prussian Army in 1911 and fought in World War I, finishing the war as an Oberleutnant and the adjutant to the 73rd Infantry Brigade. At the end of the war, he remained in the Reichswehr as a career officer. Höhne was an infantry battalion commander from 1934 to 1938. During World War II, he was a regimental and division commander before commanding the VIII Army Corps and the LXXXIX Army Corps.

== Awards and decorations ==
- Iron Cross (1914) 2nd Class (23 September 1914) & 1st Class (31 August 1915)
- Knight's Cross of the House Order of Hohenzollern with swords
- Hanseatic Cross of Hamburg
- Wound Badge in silver
- Honour Cross of the World War 1914/1918
- Clasp to the Iron Cross (1939) 2nd Class (24 September 1939) & 1st Class (20 October 1939)
- Knight's Cross of the Iron Cross with Oak Leaves
  - Knight's Cross on 30 June 1941 as Generalmajor and commander of 8. Infanterie-Division
  - Oak Leaves on 17 May 1943 as Generalleutnant and commander of Korps "Laux"

Military offices
Preceded by Generaloberst Walter Heitz	Commander of VIII. Armeekorps; 20 July 1943 – 1 April 1944	Succeeded by Generalleutnant Johannes Block
Preceded by Generalleutnant Hans Schlemmer	Commander of VIII. Armeekorps; 12 May 1944 – 10 September 1944	Succeeded by General der Artillerie Walter Hartmann
Preceded by Generalleutnant Ernst Dehner	Commander of LXIII. Armeekorps; 18 November 1944 - 24 November 1944	Succeeded by General der Infanterie Friedrich-August Schack
Preceded by General der Infanterie Werner Freiherr von und zu Gilsa	Commander of LXXXIX. Armeekorps; 23 November 1944 – April 1945	Succeeded by none
