= Breskens Pocket =

Fortified German resistance in WWII

- Part of the Western Front of 1944–45 in the European theatre of World War II
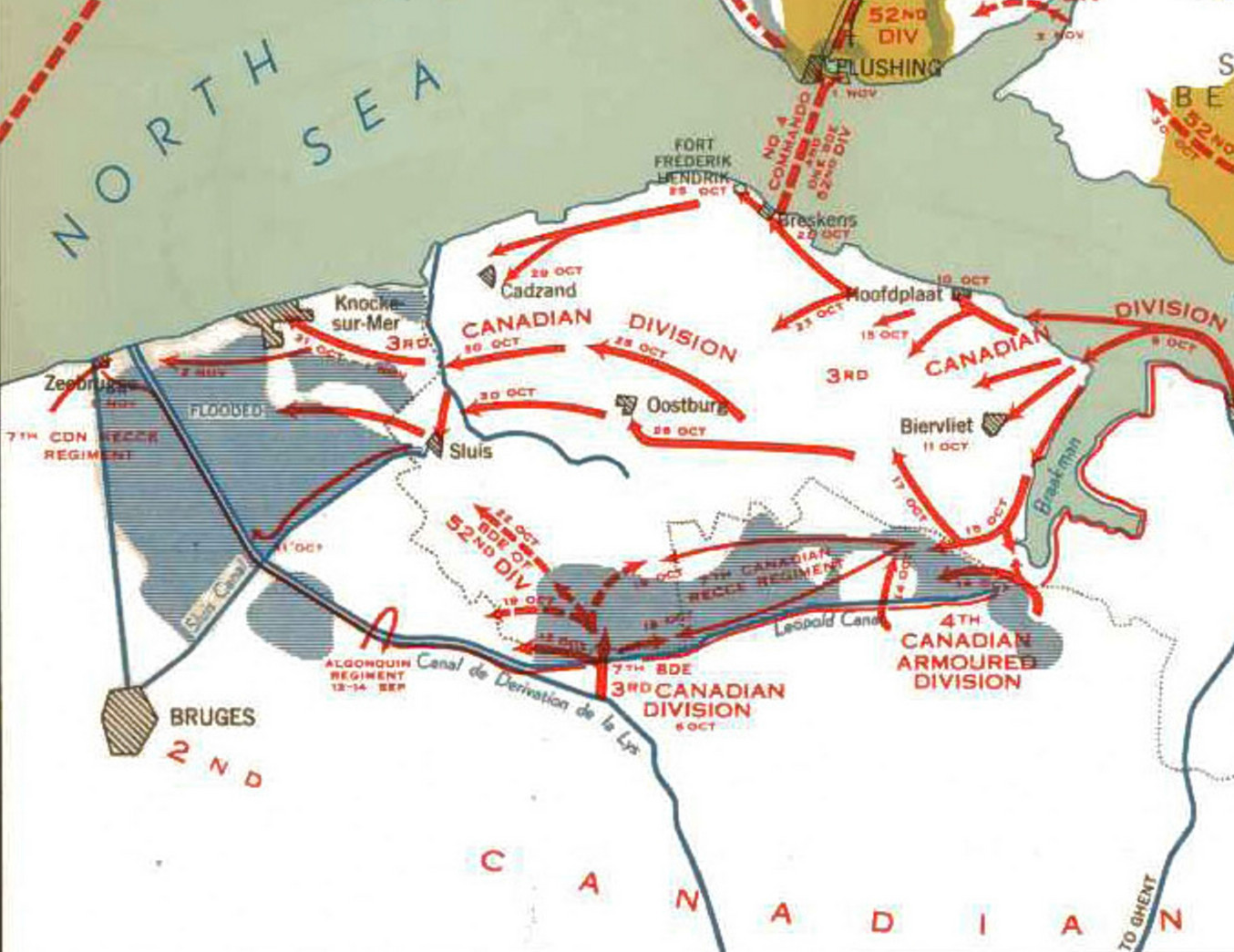
- Breskens Pocket
Date	10 October – 3 November 1944
Location	Breskens, Netherlands
Result	Canadian Victory

Belligerents
Canada	Germany

Commanders and leaders
(Canada) Harry Crerar	(Nazi Germany) Knut Eberding

Strength
Canadian First Army: 3rd Canadian Division; 4th Canadian Division	15th Army: 64th Infantry Division

Casualties and losses
2,077 casualties	12,707 casualties

The Breskens Pocket was a pocket of fortified German resistance against the Canadian First Army in the Battle of the Scheldt during the Second World War. It was chiefly situated on the southern shore of the Scheldt estuary in the southern Netherlands, near the Belgian border. It was named after the town of Breskens, which was later freed from German occupation during Operation Switchback.

The Breskens Pocket was known in Berlin as "Scheldt Fortress South".

== Order Of Battle ==
=== Allied Forces ===
Canadian First Army

- 3rd Canadian Division
- 4th Canadian Division

=== Axis Forces ===
15th Army (Wehrmacht)

- 64th Infantry Division

== Aftermath ==
An intelligence summary by 1st Canadian Army in the immediate wake of the battle, referred to the 64th Infantry Division as "the best infantry division we have met." The Germans had been well supported by numerous heavy guns of the Atlantic Wall and the terrain had been atrocious. Canadian official history noted, Belgian military manuals described the local polder as "generalement impropre aux operations militaires". The Canadians suffered 2,077 casualties while the Germans had suffered 12,707 soldiers killed, wounded, missing or captured. When Operation Switchback ended, British general Bernard Montgomery bestowed the nickname "Water Rats" on the 3rd Canadian Infantry Division, a play on the Desert Rats title the 7th Armoured Division had earned during the Western Desert Campaign. Canadian General Harry Crerar reportedly hated the term, though it was meant as a tribute to their success in amphibious operations in Normandy and the Scheldt.
