= VIII Army Corps (Wehrmacht) =

- VIII. Armeekorps
- Active: October 1934 – May 1945
- Country: Nazi Germany
- Branch: Army
- Size: Corps
- Engagements: World War II: Invasion of Poland; Battle of France; Operation Barbarossa; Battle of Białystok–Minsk; Battle of Smolensk (1941); Battle of Stalingrad; Lublin–Brest Offensive; Vistula–Oder Offensive; Lower Silesian Offensive

Commanders
- Notable commanders: Ernst Busch; Gustav Höhne; Walter Heitz

VIII Army Corps (VIII. Armeekorps) was a corps in the German Army during World War II. It was destroyed during the Battle of Stalingrad and reformed in mid-1943.

== Commanders ==
- Cavalry General (General der Kavallerie) Paul Ludwig Ewald von Kleist, 21 May 1935 – 3 February 1938
- Infantry General (General der Infanterie) Ernst Busch, 3 February 1938 – 25 October 1939
- Colonel-General (Generaloberst) Walter Heitz, 25 October 1939 – 31 January 1943

After reformation

- Infantry General (General der Infanterie) Gustav Höhne, 20 July 1943 – 1 April 1944
- Lieutenant General (Generalleutnant) Johannes Block, 1 April 1944 – 15 April 1944
- Lieutenant General (Generalleutnant) Hans Schlemmer, 15 April 1944 – 12 May 1944
- Infantry General (General der Infanterie) Gustav Höhne, 12 May 1944 – 10 September 1944
- Artillery General (General der Artillerie) Walter Hartmann, 10 September 1944 - 19 March 1945
- Infantry General (General der Infanterie) Friedrich Wiese, 19 March 1945 - 20 April 1945
- Artillery General (General der Artillerie) Horst von Mellenthin, 20 April 1945 - 8 May 1945

== Area of operations ==
- Poland - September 1939 - May 1940
- France - May 1940 - June 1941
- Eastern Front, southern sector - June 1941 - October 1942
- Stalingrad - October 1942 - January 1943
- Eastern Front, - July 1943 - September 1944
- Eastern Front, central sector - September 1944 - May 1945

== See also ==
- List of German corps in World War II
