= Werner von Gilsa =

German general (1889–1945)

- Gilsa in 1940
- Born: 4 March 1889; Berlin, German Empire
- Died: 8 May 1945 (aged 56); Leitmeritz, Nazi Germany
- Military career
- Allegiance: German Empire; Weimar Republic; Nazi Germany
- Branch: German Army
- Rank: General der Infanterie
- Commands: LXXXIX Army Corps; Military commander of Dresden
- Conflicts: World War I; World War II
- Awards: Knight's Cross of the Iron Cross with Oak Leaves

Werner Freiherr von und zu Gilsa (4 March 1889 – 8 May 1945) was a German general in the Wehrmacht during World War II, whose last assignment was as military commandant of Dresden.

Gilsa was born in Berlin in 1889 and entered the Royal Prussian Army in 1908. He fought in World War I in staff and field command positions and was awarded the Iron Cross, 1st and 2nd class among other decorations. At the end of the war, he remained in the peacetime Reichswehr as a career officer. In 1936, he was the commander of the Olympic village for the 1936 Summer Olympics. From 1 April 1941 to 4 April 1943, Gilsa was commander of the 216th Infantry Division. In the winter of 1941/42 the division was sent to the Eastern Front. Gilsa was promoted to General of Infantry on 1 July 1943. From 11 June 1943 to 23 November 1944 he was Commanding General of the LXXXIX Army Corps, which took part in the Battle of the Scheldt, from 2 October to 8 November 1944. Gilsa was Military Commander of Dresden from 15 March to May 1945. At the end of the war, Gilsa committed suicide.

== Awards and decorations ==
- Iron Cross (1914) 1st Class (18 October 1914) & 1st Class (14 May 1915)
- Knight's Cross of the Royal House Order of Hohenzollern with Swords
- Hanseatic Cross of Hamburg
- Military Merit Cross of Austria-Hungary
- Honour Cross of the World War 1914/1918
- Clasp to the Iron Cross (1939) 2nd Class (14 September 1939) & 1st Class (21 October 1939)
- Knight's Cross of the Iron Cross with Oak Leaves
  - Knight's Cross on 5 June 1940 as Oberst and commander of Infanterie-Regiment 9
  - 68th Oak Leaves on 24 January 1942 as Generalmajor and commander of 216. Infanterie-Division

Military offices
Preceded by Generalleutnant Kurt Himer	Commander of 216. Infanterie-Division; 1 April 1941 – 4 April 1943	Succeeded by General der Infanterie Friedrich-August Schack
Preceded by General der Panzertruppe Alfred Ritter von Hubicki	Commander of LXXXIX. Armeekorps; 11 June 1943 – 12 January 1944	Succeeded by Generalleutnant Friedrich-Wilhelm Neumann
Preceded by Generalleutnant Friedrich-Wilhelm Neumann	Commander of LXXXIX. Armeekorps; 29 January 1944 – 23 November 1944	Succeeded by General der Infanterie Gustav Höhne
