= Curt Haase =

German general during World War II

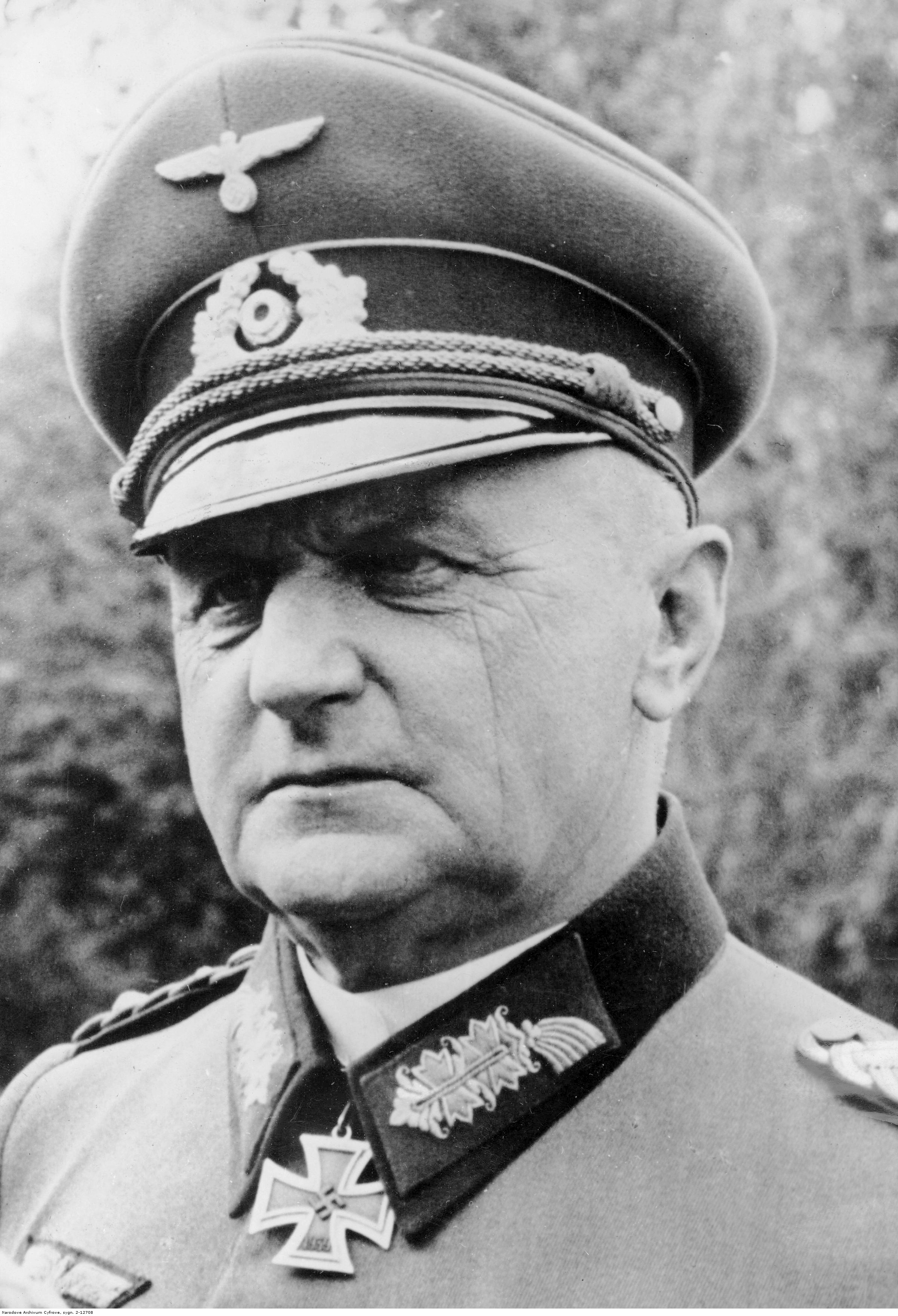
- Haase in 1941
- Born: 15 December 1881; Bad Honnef, German Empire
- Died: 9 February 1943 (aged 61); Berlin, Nazi Germany
- Burial place: Invalidenfriedhof, Berlin
- Military career
- Allegiance: German Empire; Weimar Republic; Nazi Germany
- Branch: German Empire; Reichswehr; German Army
- Service years: 1901–1943
- Rank: Generaloberst
- Commands: 3rd Infantry Division; III Corps; 15th Army
- Conflicts: World War I; World War II; Invasion of Poland; Battle of France
- Awards: Knight's Cross of the Iron Cross

Curt Haase (15 December 1881 – 9 February 1943) was a German general (Generaloberst) in during World War II. He commanded the III Corps during the Invasion of Poland and France. He later commanded the 15th Army in German-occupied France from January 1941 to November 1942.

== World War I ==
In 1901 Haase joined the 4th Württemberg Field Artillery Regiment No. 65 of the Württemberg Army in Ludwigsburg and was promoted to the rank of leutnant in 1902. In 1905 he was an adjutant of the 1st Division and eventually achieved the rank of lieutenant in 1910. From 1911 to 1914 Haase commanded a training regiment in the Prussian Staff College. At the outbreak of the First World War Haase commanded a company. He was promoted to captain in 1914 and served in various staff positions for the rest of the war. After the war, Haase joined the Reichswehr.

== World War II ==
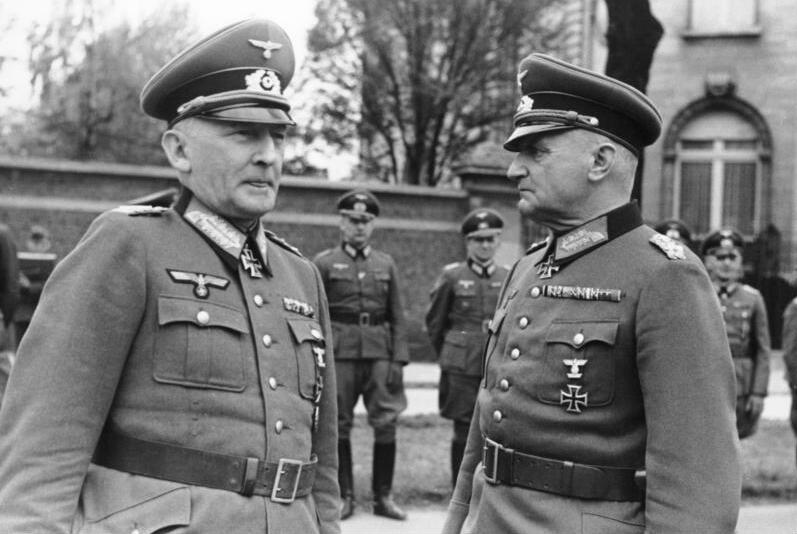
Haase (right) with Field Marshal Erwin von Witzleben, 1941

Haase became commander of III Corps on 16 November 1938. At the beginning of World War II, he commanded the III Corps in the Invasion of Poland and the Battle of France. On 15 May 1940 Haase's corps broke through the French defensive positions at Charleville-Mézières, for which he received the Knight's Cross of the Iron Cross on 8 June 1940. Haase was promoted to Generaloberst on 19 July 1940 and in mid-November 1940, he was relieved of his command and reassigned to the Führer-Reserve.

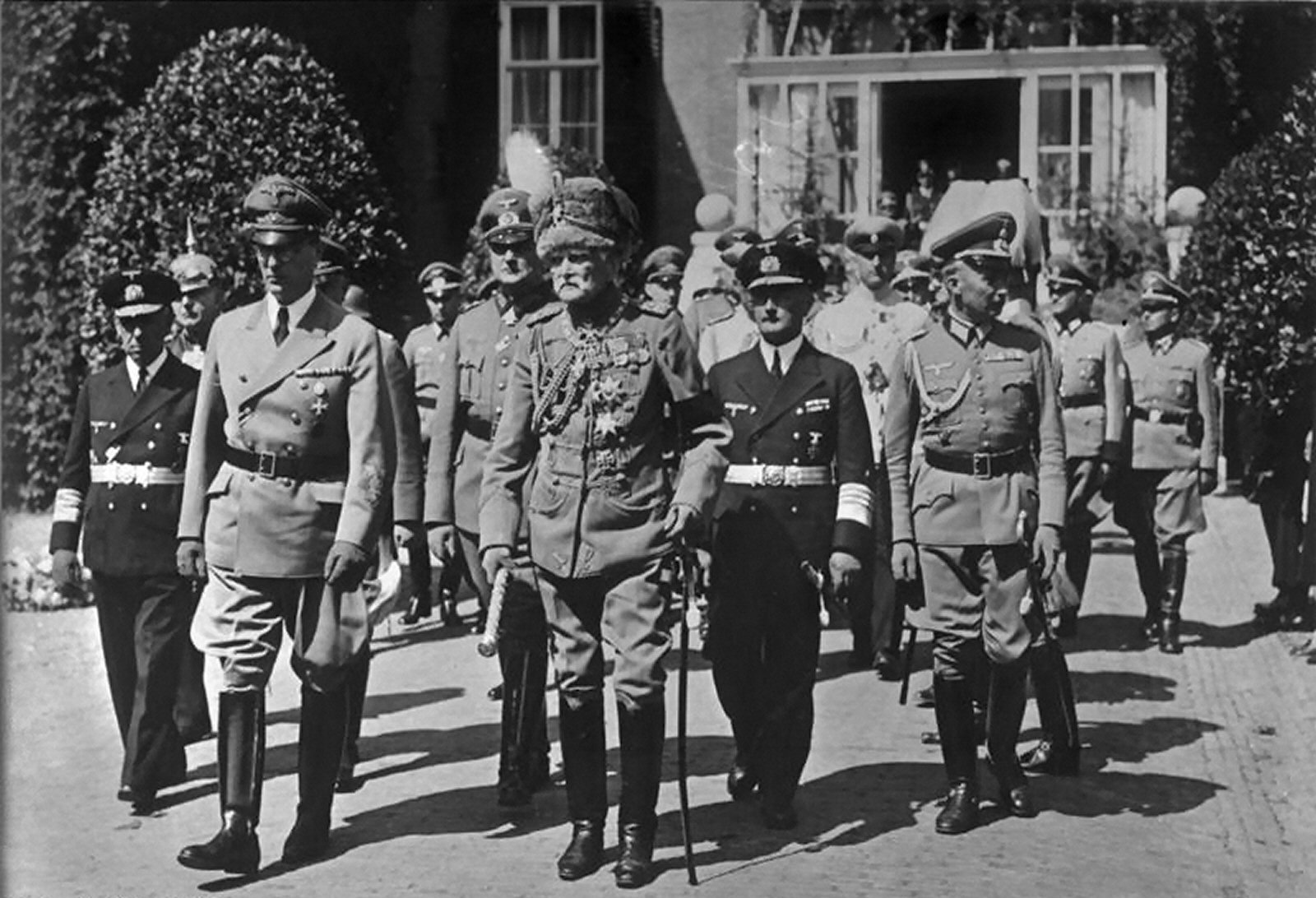
Haase attending Wilhelm II's funeral with Arthur Seyss-Inquart and August von Mackensen

On 4 June 1941 he attended the funeral of German Emperor Wilhelm II at Doorn Manor in the Netherlands as a representative of the Oberkommando des Heeres.

From early 1941 to December 1942 he commanded the 15th Army deployed in France, during that period the army was tasked with the protection of the Channel coast from a possible Allied invasion. He was transferred again to the Führer-Reserve for the remainder of his career and died on 9 February 1943 at the age of 61 of heart disease.

== Awards ==
- Iron Cross (1914), 2nd and 1st class
- Knight's Cross of the Royal House Order of Hohenzollern with Swords
- Knight's Cross of the Military Merit Order (Württemberg)
- Knight's Cross, 1st class of the Albert Order with Swords (Saxony)
- Knight's Cross, 1st class of the Friedrich Order with Swords (Württemberg)
- Knight's Cross, 2nd class of the Order of the Zähringer Lion with Swords and Oak Leaves (Baden)
- Hanseatic Cross of Hamburg
- Honour Cross of the World War 1914/1918
- Clasp to the Iron Cross, 1st and 2nd class
- Knight's Cross of the Iron Cross on 8 June 1940 as General der Artillerie and commanding general of the III. Armeekorps

Military offices
Preceded by —	Commander of 3. Infanterie-Division; 4 April 1934 – 3 July 1936	Succeeded by Generalmajor Walter Petzel
Preceded by —	Commander of III. Armeekorps; 1 September 1939 - 13 November 1940	Succeeded by General der Infanterie Kurt von Greiff
