= 348th Infantry Division =

- German: 348. Infanterie-Division
- Active: September 1942 – September 1944
- Country: Nazi Germany
- Branch: Army
- Type: Infantry
- Size: Division
- Engagements: World War II

The 348th Infantry Division (German: 348. Infanterie-Division) was an infantry division of the German Army during the Second World War, active from 1942 to 1944.

== Operational history ==
The 348th Infantry Division was formed on 14 September 1942 in France from personnel of Wehrkreis XII.

After its training, it served as an occupation, security and defense unit of the coastal areas in the North of France, in the Dieppe and Calais sector within the LXXXI. Armeekorps of the 15th Army in Army Group D.

As of 1 May 1944, the 348th Infantry Division was deployed between Flocques and Saint-Valery-sur-Somme along the coast of Normandy.

In August 1944, the division was sent to Normandy, where it suffered heavy losses during its withdrawal to northern France and Belgium.

The division was disbanded on 29 September 1944.

== Noteworthy individuals ==
=== Commanders ===
- Generalleutnant Karl Gümbel (27 September 1942 – 5 February 1944)
- Generalleutnant Paul Seyffardt (5 February - 29 September 1944)

=== Soldiers ===
- Heinrich Böll, German author and Group 47 member
