= 15th Army (Wehrmacht) =

- German: 15. Armee
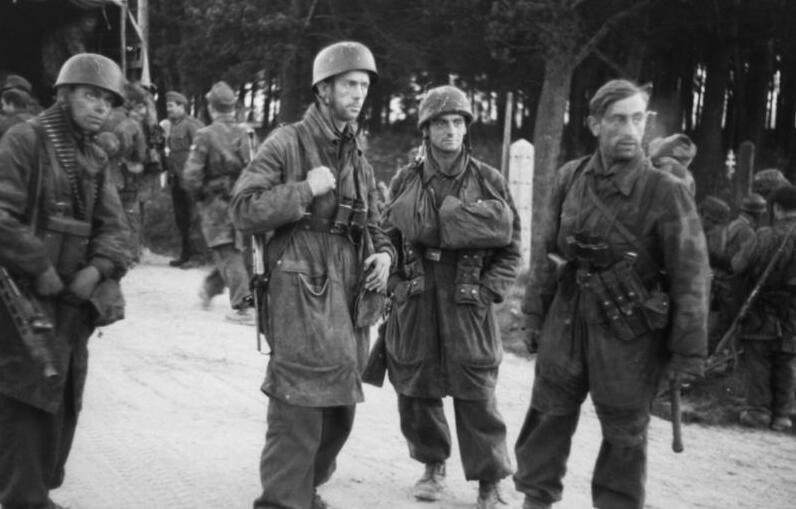
- 15th Army Fallschirmjäger in Normandy in June 1944
- Active: 15 January 1941 – 17 April 1945
- Country: Nazi Germany
- Branch: German army ( Wehrmacht)
- Size: Field army

Commanders
- Notable commanders: Curt Haase; Heinrich von Vietinghoff; Hans von Salmuth; Gustav-Adolf von Zangen

The 15th Army (German: 15. Armee) was a field army of the German army in World War II.

== History ==
The 15th Army was activated in occupied France on 15 January 1941 with General Curt Haase in command. It was tasked with occupation and defensive duties in the Pas de Calais area.

The Allies landed further west, in Operation Overlord, during June 1944. Afterwards, the 15th Army was withdrawn to the Netherlands, where it fought the Allies during Operation Market Garden in September 1944.

It suffered defeat against the First Canadian Army in the Battle of the Scheldt during which the Army Headquarters at Dordrecht was subject to a mass attack by Hawker Typhoons of the Second Tactical Air Force on 24 October 1944. Two generals and 70 other staff officers were killed in the attack. According to a Dutch documentary there were 69 civilian casualties and some German casualties, but not any of the staff officers.

During October 1944 the 15th Army continued to resist against the Canadian First Army and British Second Army as they pushed west from the Nijmegen/Eindhoven salient in Operation Pheasant.

The British Second Army cleared the 15th Army from the Roer Triangle during Operation Blackcock, pushing it back over the Rur and Wurm rivers. It was involved in the Battle of Hurtgen Forest before finally surrendering along the Ruhr river in 1945.

Today, the former HQ of the 15th Army, in Tourcoing, which is just north of Lille in France, is a museum: Museum of 5 June 1944.

== Sept. 1944 Order of Battle ==
- LXVII Corps, General der Infanterie Otto Sponheimer
  - 64th Infantry Division - Generalmajor Knut Eberding - trapped and destroyed in Breskens Pocket
  - 70th Static Division - Generalleutnant Wilhelm Daser - occupied South Beveland and Walcheren on the Scheldt
  - 346th Infantry Division - Generalleutnant Erich Diestel
  - 711th Static Division - Generalleutnant Josef Reichert
  - 719th Coastal Division - Generalleutnant Karl Sievers - Transferred to 1st Fallschirmarmee September 4.
- LXXXVIII Corps, General der Infanterie Hans-Wolfgang Reinhard
  - 59th Infantry Division - Generalleutnant Walter Poppe
  - 85th Infantry Division - Generalleutnant Kurt Chill - later transferred to LXVII Korps
  - 245th Infantry Division - Oberst Gerhard Kegler - later transferred to LXVII Korps
  - 256th Infantry Division - Destroyed in Operation Bagration on Eastern Front, reconstituted Sept/Oct 1944 in Holland
  - 712th Infantry Division - Generalleutnant Friedrich-Wilhelm Neumann

== Commanders ==
| No. | Portrait | Commander | Took office | Left office | Time in office |
|---|---|---|---|---|---|
| 1 | Curt Haase | Generaloberst; Curt Haase (1881–1943) | 15 January 1941 | 30 November 1942 | 1 year, 319 days |
| 2 | Heinrich von Vietinghoff | Generaloberst; Heinrich von Vietinghoff (1887–1952) | 1 December 1942 | 7 August 1943 | 249 days |
| 3 | Hans von Salmuth | Generaloberst; Hans von Salmuth (1888–1962) | 8 August 1943 | 24 August 1944 | 1 year, 16 days |
| 4 | Gustav-Adolf von Zangen | General der Infanterie; Gustav-Adolf von Zangen (1892–1964) | 25 August 1944 | 17 April 1945 | 235 days |
