= Hans-Wolfgang Reinhard =

German general (1888–1950)

- Born: 11 December 1888
- Died: 6 October 1950 (aged 61)
- Military career
- Allegiance: German Empire; Weimar Republic; Nazi Germany
- Branch: German Army
- Service years: 1908–1945
- Rank: General der Infanterie
- Commands: 35th Infantry Division; LI Army Corps; LXXXVIII Army Corps
- Conflicts: World War I; World War II; Battle of Belgium; Battle of France; Invasion of Yugoslavia; Operation Barbarossa; Battle of Kiev (1941); First Battle of Kharkov; Operation Market Garden; Battle of the Scheldt
- Awards: Knight's Cross of the Iron Cross

Hans-Wolfgang Reinhard (11 December 1888 – 6 October 1950) was a German general in the Wehrmacht during World War II. He was a recipient of the Knight's Cross of the Iron Cross of Nazi Germany.

== Awards and decorations ==
- Iron Cross (1914)
  - 2nd Class
  - 1st Class
- Honour Cross of the World War 1914/1918
- Iron Cross (1939)
  - 2nd Class
  - 1st Class
- Eastern Front Medal
- Knight's Cross of the Iron Cross on 22 September 1941 as General der Infanterie and commander of LI Army Corps

Military offices
Preceded by Generalleutnant Hubert Schaller-Kallide	Commander of 35th Infantry Division; 24 November 1938 – 25 November 1940	Succeeded by General der Infanterie Walther Fischer von Weikersthal
Preceded by none	Commander of LI Army Corps; 25 November 1940 – 8 May 1942	Succeeded by General der Artillerie Walther von Seydlitz-Kurzbach
Preceded by none	Commander of LXXXVIII Army Corps; 8 June 1942 – 22 December 1944	Succeeded by General der Infanterie Felix Schwalbe
