= Walter Poppe (general) =

German general

Walter Fritz Rudolf Poppe
- Born: 8 August 1892
- Died: 17 August 1968 (aged 76)
- Military career
- Allegiance: Nazi Germany
- Branch: Army (Wehrmacht)
- Rank: Generalleutnant
- Conflicts: World War II

Walter Fritz Rudolf Poppe (8 August 1892 – 17 August 1968) was a German general during the Second World War leading the 59th Infantry Division.

On 12 January 1942, he succeeded Wilhelm Wetzel as command of the 255th Infantry Division between the Eastern Front and France until it was disbanded in October 1943, at which point he succeeded Otto Lasch as command of the 217th Infantry Division on the Eastern Front, until it was also disbanded a month later on November 15. He participated in Operation Market Garden, leading the 59th Infantry Division where he led his troops across a river crossing between Breskens and Flushing. After the war he was credited as a 'Military Advisor' on the 1974 film A Bridge Too Far even though he had died in 1968. By war's end, he held command of the 467th Infantry Division.

== Sources ==
- Patzwall, Klaus D.; Scherzer, Veit (2001). Das Deutsche Kreuz 1941 – 1945 Geschichte und Inhaber Band II [The German Cross 1941 – 1945 History and Recipients Volume 2] (in German). Norderstedt, Germany: Verlag Klaus D. Patzwall. ISBN 978-3-931533-45-8.
