= LI Army Corps =

LI. Army Corps
- Generalkommando LI. Armeekorps (röm. 51. AK)
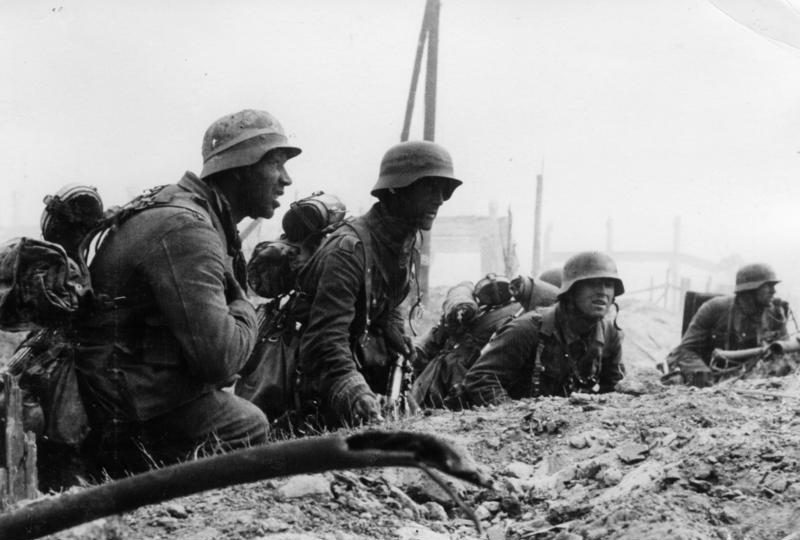
- Active: 25 November 1940 – 31 January 1943
- Disbanded: 31 January 1943
- Country: Nazi Germany
- Engagements: World War II; Battle of Stalingrad

Commanders
- Notable commanders: Walther von Seydlitz-Kurzbach

LI Army Corps (German: LI. Armeekorps) was an infantry corps of the German Army during World War II that participated in the invasion of Yugoslavia. It was also present at the Battle of Stalingrad, where it was commanded by General Walther von Seydlitz-Kurzbach. After von Seydlitz-Kurzbach instructed his officers on 25 January 1943 that the question of surrender was their personal choice to make, he was relieved of command.

After most of the Corps was captured or destroyed at Stalingrad, remnants of it were combined with other units to form the LI Mountain Corps in August 1943, under the command of General Valentin Feurstein. The LI Mountain Corps formed part of German forces in Italy for the remainder of the war, participating in the Battle of Monte Cassino and other German defensive actions.

== Commanding generals ==
- General der Infanterie Hans-Wolfgang Reinhard, creation – 8 May 1942
- General der Artillerie Walther von Seydlitz-Kurzbach, 8 May 1942 – 25 January 1943
