= Friedrich-Wilhelm Neumann =

German Army general (1889-1975)

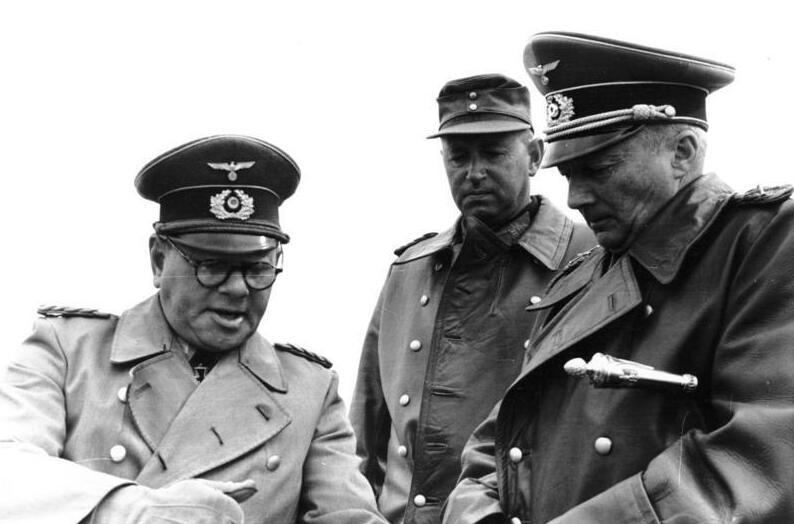
- Felix Schwalbe (left), Friedrich-Wilhelm Neumann (middle) and Günther von Kluge (right) visiting the Atlantic Wall in northern France in 1944
- Born: 22 January 1889; Osterode, East Prussia, German Empire
- Died: 26 January 1975 (aged 86); Bad Wiessee, Bavaria, West Germany
- Military career
- Allegiance: German Empire; Weimar Republic; Nazi Germany
- Branch: Imperial German Army; Reichswehr; German Army
- Service years: 1906–1921; 1935–1945
- Rank: Generalleutnant
- Commands: 340th Infantry Division; LXXXIX Army Corps; 712th Infantry Division; XXX Army Corps; XXXIII Army Corps
- Conflicts: World War I; World War II; Invasion of Poland; Siegfried Line Campaign
- Awards: Knight's Cross of the Iron Cross

Friedrich-Wilhelm Neumann (22 January 1889 – 26 January 1975) was a German military officer who fought in both world wars. As a general during World War II, he held several divisional and corps level commands. He was a recipient of the Knight's Cross of the Iron Cross.

Neumann was born in 1889 at the Ostróda Castle in Osterode in East Prussia (today, Ostróda in Poland) and entered the Royal Prussian Army in 1906 as an officer cadet. He fought in World War I, and at the end of the war he was an Hauptmann on the staff of the 14th Army. He initially remained in the army after the end of the war, but due to the reduced size of the new post-war Reichswehr, he left the army in 1921 with the brevet rank of Major and went into police service.

In October 1935, during the formation expantion of the new Wehrmacht, Heumann left police service and reentered the army as an Oberstleutnant. He became a regimental commander, leading Infantry Regiment 17 from April 1938 to December 1939. At that time, he advanced to the command of the 191st Infantry Division and was promoted to Generalmajor in February 1940. He commanded the 340th Infantry Division from December 1940 to March 1942. As a Generalleutnant since February 1942, he next led the 712th Infantry Division. He also intermittently held some short term corps-level commands, and was in charge of XXXIII Army Corps for the last month of the war in April–May 1945 before the German surrender.

== Awards and decorations ==
- Iron Cross (1914) 2nd and 1st class
- Hanseatic Cross of Hamburg
- Wound Badge (1918) in black
- Honour Cross of the World War 1914/1918
- Clasp to the Iron Cross (1939) 2nd and 1st class
- German Cross in silver (30 October 1943)
- Knight's Cross of the Iron Cross on 16 October 1944 as Generalleutnant and commander of 712. Infanterie-Division

Military offices
Preceded by Generalmajor George von Döhren	Commander of 712. Infanterie-Division; 16 April 1942 – 25 February 1945	Succeeded by Generalmajor Joachim von Siegroth
Preceded by General der Infanterie Werner Freiherr von und zu Gilsa	Commander of LXXXIX. Armeekorps; 12 January 1944 – 29 January 1944	Succeeded by General der Infanterie Werner Freiherr von und zu Gilsa
Preceded by Generalmajor Friedrich von Unger	Commander of XXXIII. Armeekorps; 5 April 1945 – 7 May 1945	Succeeded by None (Unit Surrendered)
