= Josef Reichert =

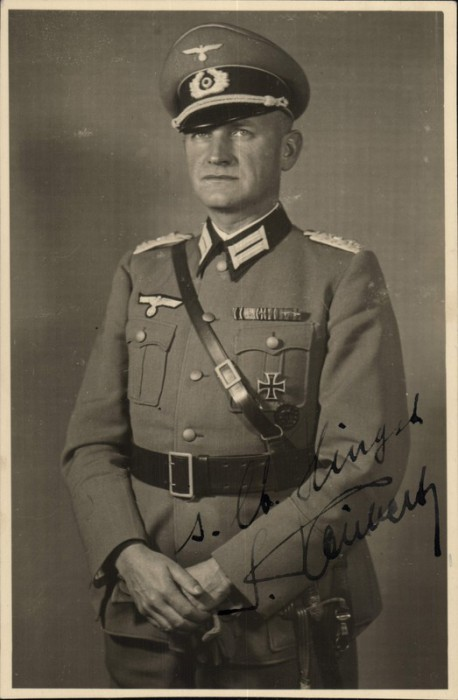
- Born: 12 December 1891
- Died: 15 March 1970 (aged 78)
- Military career
- Allegiance: Nazi Germany
- Branch: Army (Wehrmacht)
- Rank: Generalleutnant
- Commands: Division Nr. 177; 714th Infantry Division; 711th Infantry Division
- Conflicts: World War II
- Awards: Knight's Cross of the Iron Cross

Josef Reichert (12 December 1891 – 15 March 1970) was a German general during World War II who commanded several divisions. He was a recipient of the Knight's Cross of the Iron Cross.

== Awards ==
- Knight's Cross of the Iron Cross on 9 December 1944 as Generalleutnant and commander of 711. Infanterie-Division

== Notes ==
Military offices
Preceded by Generalleutnant Hermann von Gimborn	Commander of Division Nr. 177; 20 September 1941 – 1 January 1943	Succeeded by Generalmajor Erich Müller-Derichsweiler
Preceded by Generalleutnant Friedrich Stahl	Commander of 714. Infanterie-Division; 1 January 1943 – 20 February 1943	Succeeded by General der Gebirgstruppen Karl Eglseer
Preceded by Generalleutnant Friedrich-Wilhelm Deutsch	Commander of 711. Infanterie-Division; 1 March 1943 – 14 April 1945	Succeeded by Oberst von Watzdorf
