= 712th Infantry Division =

- German: 712. Infanterie-Division
- Division coat-of-arms
- Active: 5 May 1941 – 2 May 1945
- Disbanded: 2 May 1945
- Country: Nazi Germany
- Branch: Heer (Wehrmacht)
- Type: Infantry
- Size: Division
- Engagements: World War II

The 712th Infantry Division (German: 712. Infanterie-Division) was a German Army Infantry division in World War II.

== Operational history ==
The 712th Infantry Division was raised in early 1941 as part of the 15th wave of Wehrmacht forces, and was moved to occupied France along the demarcation line with Vichy France. In the spring of 1942, it was moved to the Low Countries, where it occupied the area around Zeebrugge.

From August/September 1942 until September 1944 the division was part of the 89th Army Corps, a part of Army Group B's 15th Army, in order to counter the Allied invasion of France; the 89th Corps was stationed along the Belgian coast at the time in order to prevent further amphibious assaults. It was considered by the Germans that an Allied attack on Belgium (if not France) was far more likely than one on the Netherlands; as such, infantry divisions were more concentrated here.

In September 1944, the division was defending the banks of the Scheldt river near Antwerp when it was attacked by Poles serving under General Guy Simonds.

=== Reformation and Poland ===
After suffering heavy casualties when the Allied forces made their way into the Netherlands, the 712th was reformed and sent to the eastern front. With the Red Army being supplied by an ever-increasing arsenal of weapons and vehicles, the division was unable to match them in Poland, and was decimated along the river Oder in February/March 1945. Much of the combat troops were absorbed by units such as Panzer Division Kurmark, and the 45th and 68th Infantry Divisions, who were also being quickly pushed back by Soviet forces.

=== Final reformation and capitulation ===
In March, the division was again reformed. With no more reserves, the Wehrmacht could only supply the 712th with survivors of divisions already destroyed by the Allied forces. The division was crushed in the Halbe pocket the following month.

In March, the division was again reformed as part of the Ninth Army's XI SS Corps under SS-General Matthias Kleinheisterkamp, themselves part of Army Group Vistula (German: Heeresgruppe Weichsel). In mid-April, the division took part in opening stages of the Battle of the Seelow Heights The army was able to hold of the Soviet advance for only about three days before being forced to retreat to a pocket around the towns of Frankfurt and Fürstenwalde along the Spreewald. During Soviet advancement towards Fürstenwalde, the 712th was now surrounded, already under fire from its forward positions and now the rear. The 32nd SS-Grenadier Division was moved to Fürstenwalde to support the 712th. Encircled by the Soviets, the Ninth Army attempted to break out from 24 April through the village of Halbe. On the morning of 26 April, the 712th and the 21st Panzer Division launched an attack in-between the 1st Ukrainian Front's 28th Army and 3rd Guards Tank Army.

In its final breaths the 712th had been reduced severely to its 732nd, 745th and 764th Grenadier Regiments (each at two battalion-strength) and the 1712nd Artillery Regiment.

== Commanders ==
- Generalmajor George von Döhren (3 May 1941 – 15 Apr 1942)
- Generalleutnant Friedrich-Wilhelm Neumann (16 Apr 1942 – 25 Feb 1945)
- Generalmajor Joachim von Siegroth (25 Feb 1945 – 2 May 1945)

== Order of battle ==
1941
732nd Infantry Regiment
745th Infantry Regiment
652nd Artillery detachment
712nd Pioneer Company
712 Signals Company
712nd Supply detachment

1943
732nd Grenadier Regiment
745th Grenadier Regiment
652nd Artillery Regiment
712nd Pioneer Battalion
712nd Anti-tank company
712 Signals Battalion
712nd Supply detachment

1945
732nd Grenadier Regiment
745th Grenadier Regiment
764th Grenadier Regiment
712nd Fusilier Battalion
712nd Artillery Regiment
712nd Pioneer Battalion
712nd Anti-tank Battalion
712nd Signals Battalion
1712nd Field-replacement Battalion
712nd Supply detachment
