= 64th Infantry Division (Wehrmacht) =

- 64. Infanterie-Division
- Active: Before August 1944 – November 1944
- Country: Germany
- Branch: Army
- Type: Infantry Reserve
- Role: Infantry
- Size: Division
- Garrison/HQ: Bonn
- Engagements: World War II: Battle of Abbeville; Breskens Pocket

The 64th Infantry Division (64. Infanterie-Division) was an infantry division of the Wehrmacht during World War II.

== History ==
The division was formed sometime before August 1944 in Cologne. It saw action at Battle of Abbeville and was isolated when the 15th Army left by Scheldt. Because of the division's commander, Major General Knut Eberding, to stay behind and fight the 2nd Canadian Corps resulting in the Breskens Pocket. Because of the battle the main army was able to organize the Ardennes Offensive.

Although the division was eventually overwhelmed and forced to withdraw from the Breskens Pocket as a result of Operation Switchback, the 64th Infantry Division had resourcefully defended its perimeter. In an intelligence report by the First Canadian Army, the 64th Infantry Division was complimented as "the best infantry division [the Canadian First Army] ever met".

== Organization ==
Organization of the Division:

- 1037th Grenadier Regiment
- 1038th Grenadier Regiment
- 1059th Grenadier Regiment
- 164th Artillery Regiment
- 64th Fusilier Battalion
- 164th Tank Destroyer Company
- 164th Engineer Battalion
- 164th Signal Battalion
- 164th Divisional Supply Group
