= 70th Infantry Division (Wehrmacht) =

- 70. Infanterie-Division
- Active: 1944
- Country: Nazi Germany
- Branch: Army
- Type: Infantry
- Size: Division
- Garrison/HQ: Walcheren Island
- Engagements: World War II

The 70th Infantry Division (German: 70. Infanterie-Division) was a unit of the German Army during World War II. It was formed in 1944 from personnel previously exempted from military service due to stomach disorders or injuries (sometimes referred to as a "stomach division").

== History ==
As World War II progressed, German manpower available for military service declined and this was exacerbated by the severe losses suffered in Normandy, Tunisia and Stalingrad. Groups of men that had been previously declared unfit for active service were drafted or recalled into service. These included those with stomach complaints, injuries, and illnesses. German soldiers suffering from stomach illnesses or digestive complaints not deemed severe enough to prevent them from fighting were organized into "stomach" (German: magen) or "stomach ill" (German: magenkranken) units. The 70th Infantry Division of World War II is the only known case of this practice being employed at the divisional level.

To keep them well enough to fight, they were fed on a specialised diet and were allowed their own latrines to avoid spreading their illnesses.

To facilitate the provision of special foods, it was decided that these men would be concentrated into one formation (hence the unofficial description of "White Bread" or German: Magen (Stomach) Division). Tessin does use the terminology of (M) and Magen to denote stomach troops, so it may have been an official Wehrmacht designation.

The Division was formally created on July 17, 1944, on Walcheren Island. The divisional staff, including the commander General Wilhelm Daser, were transferred from the recently disbanded 165th Reserve Division. The infantry was supplied by six repurposed security battalions of "stomach" troops that had been previously formed in February 1944. As part of LXXXIX Corps (15th Army), the Division garrisoned Walcheren Island and the South Beveland isthmus in August 1944. Starting in early October, it defended South Beveland from overland attacks by the II Canadian Corps and I British Corps as part of the Battle of the Scheldt and had fallen back to Walcheren Island by October 26. Although not a first-class formation, the 70th was installed in static defences and supported by ample heavy artillery and held out for over a month. The Division, left with no escape route from Walcheren, surrendered on 9 November 1944 and 10,000 Germans became prisoners of war.

The German 282nd Replacement and Training Infantry Battalion (German: Infantrie Ersatz und Ausbildungs Bataillon 282 (M)) was committed to combat during the last stages of World War II. It was referred to as "Stomach Trouble Battalion 282" by the American 749th Tank Battalion.

Lieutenant General Brian Horrocks of XXX Corps used this term in an interview for the documentary series The World at War, where he described a unit of sick troops being amongst the only German forces protecting the Rhine in Belgium.

== Order of battle ==
The Divisional commander for its entire existence was Generalleutnant Wilhelm Daser.

Structure
Structure of the division:
- 1018th Grenadier Regiment (1018. Grenadier-Regiment)
- 1019th Grenadier Regiment (1019. Grenadier-Regiment)
- 1020th Grenadier Regiment (1020. Grenadier-Regiment)
- 170th Artillery Regiment (170. Artillerie-Regiment)
- 170th Fusilier Battalion (70. Divisions-Füsilier-Bataillon)
- 170th Tank Destroyer Company (170. Panzerjäger-Kompanie)
- 170th Engineer Battalion (170. Pionier-Bataillon)
- 170th Signal Detachment (170. Signalabtrennung)
- 170th Field Replacement Battalion (170. Feldersatz-Bataillon)
- 170th Divisional Supply Group (170. Divisionsversorgungsgruppe)
