= 719th Infantry Division =

- German: 719. Infanterie-Division
- Active: May 1941 – April 1945
- Country: Nazi Germany
- Branch: Heer (Wehrmacht)
- Type: Infantry
- Mascot: Rabbit
- Engagements: World War II

Commanders
- Notable commanders: Felix Schwalbe

The 719th Infantry Division (German: 719. Infanterie Division) was a German Army division of World War II.

The division founded in early May 1941, spent most of World War II stationed in the Netherlands and Antwerp, and, after the Allied invasion of June 1944, fought in several defensive battles until being destroyed in April 1945.

== History ==
The Division was formed on 3 May 1941 as part of the fifteenth Aufstellungswelle. In an order dated 13 April 1941, each military district had been required to raise two regiment for a total of thirty. The 719th Division consisted of the two regiments raised in Wehrkreis III (Berlin). These were the Infantry Regiments 723 and 743. Like the other divisions of the fifteenth wave, the 719th division consisted of only two rather than three infantry regiments.

The 719th Division was transferred to occupation activity in the Netherlands. Until July 1942 the division was part of the Command of the German Troops in the Netherlands. In July 1942 it was transferred to LXXXVIII Korps, Niederlande Armee, Armeegruppe D. The LXXXVIII Korps was transferred to Armeegruppe B in May 1944. The division remained there until 7 September 1944 when it was transferred to Antwerp as part of the LXXXVIII Korps, 1. Fsch Armee, Armeegruppe B. This move was to prepare for the Allied advance. Within a month, the division was again transferred to LXVII Korps, 15. Armee, Armeegruppe B, active in the Netherlands. It fought at Fort Merksem, Woensdrecht, Breda before being transferred to the Saarpfalz region in February 1945. In the Saarpfalz, the division was a part of LXXXV Korps, 1. Armee, Armeegruppe G. It fought at Œting at Saarlautern and in the Palatinate region before being destroyed. It is possible that the Division zbV 405 a small unit (zbV, German zur besonderen Verwendung indicates a special purpose unit, often very small), may have been reformed as 719th Division. If so, this unit would have been too small and unorganized to have had any significance at the end of the war.

The remnants of the 719th surrendered to the United States Army in early May 1945 near Münsingen in Baden-Württemberg.

== Organization ==
=== 1941 ===
- Infanterie-Regiment 723
- Infanterie-Regiment 743
- Artillerie-Abteilung 663
- Aufklärungs-Kompanie 719
- Panzerjäger-Kompanie 719
- Pionier-Kompanie 719
- Nachrichten-Kompanie 719

=== 1944 ===
- Grenadier-Regiment 723
- Grenadier-Regiment 743
- Grenadier-Regiment 766
- Artillerie-Regiment 1719
- Divisions-Füsilier-Bataillon 719
- Panzerjäger-Abteilung 719
- Pionier-Bataillon 719
- Nachrichten-Abteiliung 719
- Sanitäts-Abteilung 719
- Feldersatz-Bataillon 719
