= 711th Infantry Division (Wehrmacht) =

- German: 711. Infanterie-Division
- Division Insignia
- Active: May 1941 – May 9, 1945
- Country: Nazi Germany
- Branch: Army
- Type: Infantry
- Size: Division
- Engagements: World War II: Battle of France; Normandy landings; Operation Goodwood; Operation Pheasant

The 711th Infantry Division (German: 711. Infanterie-Division) was a German Army infantry division in World War II.

== Operational history ==
The 711th Infantry Division was raised in May 1941 as part of the 15th Army. Equipped only for occupation duties, it was sent to France as a component of the 15th Army. Originally, the division was placed along the demarcation line between German-occupied and Vichy France, but was later moved along the coast to serve in the Atlantic Wall, eventually settling as part of the 15th Army's left flank in a sector between the Orne and Seine rivers. The division was then armed with more effective weapons to assist in coastal defence, including weapons discarded by the Allies during the wide-scale retreats at the end of the Battle of France.

Generalleutnant (Major General) Josef Reichert took over command of the division in April 1943. During his time in command, he witnessed the transformation of the Atlantic Wall into a defensive fortification more comparable to "Fortress Europe" propaganda. However, the division's participation in the construction of defensive structures on behalf of Marshal Erwin Rommel led to Reichert's criticism of division training being "almost completely neglected" in favour of building concrete pillboxes for Organization Todt. According to General of the Artillery Walter Warlimont, the divisions in place around Normandy were limited in early May; the 711th; 716th and 352nd divisions were placed along the northern coast. This began to change when Hitler concluded that Normandy was a likely spot for an invasion. This provided some level of relief for the division, who were also assigned to prepare a series of mine fields that month.

=== D-Day ===
The division had been kept up all day on June 5 on an invasion alert, with the headquarters' guards company being dissolved a few days earlier in order to provide more men on the front line. Tired from the waiting and concluding that there was not going to be an invasion, Lieutenant General Reichert and his divisional staff were ready to retire at half-past twelve. Though the noise of low-flying planes could have indicated the invasion, the recent barrage of bombing raids had the divisional staff thinking that the planes were like any other. At around that time, two British paratroopers, attached to the British 6th Airborne Division, veered off course and landed at the divisional headquarters. Upon spotting them as they fell and were captured, the alarm was sounded and the anti-aircraft guns were manned. Not long after, the planes had vanished from sight, illustrating an unintended red herring that this was simply a lone commando operation. Unable to get answers from the two prisoners, Reichert concluded that the two men were part of the expected invasion force and had landed outside headquarters knowingly as part of a plan to disrupt the division's command structure. As a first measure, the nearest available reinforcements, an engineering company, were called in from Saint Arnoult to reinforce headquarters; they would arrive some two hours later to find the compound in no danger. Other elements of LXXXI Corps were alerted of the incident, with Colonel Paul Frank of the nearby 364th Infantry Division hearing about it at around one o'clock.

Over the next few hours, little action took place. According to Reichert, occasional machine gun fire could be heard, with the headquarters' poorly trained and nervous staff inadvertently firing at returning reconnaissance patrols who had been sent out to look for more paratroopers, and found no one. It was during this event that the divisional staff were engaging in a telephone conversation with the 15th Army's commander, General Hans von Salmuth, who misunderstood the commotion for the genuine invasion and alerted Marshal Erwin Rommel's stand in, General Hans Speidel immediately. Deciding not to alert his superior, Speidel went back to bed.

In constant contact with his battalions, Reichert found there to be minimal Allied presence in his sector, allowing him to reorganize forces looking towards the Cotentin Peninsula, where he had expected the bulk of the invasion to be concentrated. At approximately 02:45, elements of the 21st Panzer Division operating alongside the 711th took further British paratroopers prisoner.

Meanwhile, the men who had been stationed at the coast were largely safe in their newly built bunkers and pillboxes, with only a few casualties from enemy volleys from the sea. Two reserve battalions were ordered to mop-up Allied forces between the coast and the Saint-Arnoult-Varaville road, and from that road to Pont-l'Évêque. It was Reichert's intention to keep the roads free of Allied interference in order to maintain transport and communication routes.

At 07:30, the Panzers began attacking the British units who had grouped together at Ouistreham, along the Orne, with the 711th Division defending the bridgehead. Defending the bridgehead was considered necessary in that it would provide the panzers with space in which to focus on attacking the Allied landings on the coast. Despite their neglected training, the division was commended by Reichert for their performance in repelling Allied forces from the bridgehead east of the Orne.

This operation, also, was largely-completed by noon with the assistance of the 716th Static Division - sectored immediately to the east. Lieutenant General Reichert took advantage of the recently cleared roads to drive over to the 744th Regiment's command post to meet with its staff; on the way he saw a number of parachutes hanging from trees and telephone wires. From the regiment's post, they witnessed the coastal batteries based near Houlgate fire at Allied landing craft attempting to take the port of Ouistreham. Soon after, Reichert drove to Brucourt from where he could ascertain the extent of the airlandings between the Orne and Dives.

By the evening, a total of 300 Allied soldiers had been taken prisoner, with the 711th Division suffering few casualties in comparison. Based on the interrogation of prisoners from the 1st English and 1st Canadian Battalions of the British 6th Airborne Division, the landing parties to the east of the Orne were not the vanguard of a larger offensive, and had simply been scattered from their intended drop point and subsequently mistaken the Orne and Dives rivers at Cabourg. However, the impact of the Sword Beach landing led to the LXXXI Corps staff's decision that the sealing off the landing sites to the west of the Orne was necessary, and that the bridgehead that had been defended earlier would have to be destroyed. Unfortunately, the 346th Infantry Division had suffered worse than the 711th, and were expected to provide forces to clear their side of the bridgehead as late as 11:00 the following morning.

In mid-July, the 711th took part in Operation Goodwood near the city of Caen; its 731st Infantry Regiment was moved to Troarn with heavy artillery to slow down the British VIII Corps. As the allies continued their advance, the division was moved to Rotterdam in the Netherlands, being moved to the 5th Panzer Army in August 1944. Serving as part of LXXXVI Corps until September 1944, the 5th Panzer Army narrowly escaped destruction in the Falaise Pocket. In mid-September, the 711th was returned to the 15th Army with LXVII Corps until a shake-up in late-November, where it was moved to the LXXXVIII Corps before being taken out of the army altogether by December. In October and November 1944 beforehand, the division would fighting defensive actions in The Netherlands against the combined efforts of British, Canadian, Polish, American and Dutch forces in Operation Pheasant, most notably defending areas around Breda and Standaarbuiten against elements of the Polish 1st Armored Division and U.S. 104th Infantry Division.

=== Hungary and Ukraine ===
The reason for this was the approaching Red Army, which by now had re-claimed much of the Polish territory the Soviet Union had lost in 1941. Specifically, they had been moved to defend their Hungarian and Slovak allies. Ordered to move into Hungary in late December with IV SS-Panzer Corps under Hitler's orders, the force was put under the command of Herbert Otto Gille of the SS. Contact was lost with the 711th, and the divisional forces did not regroup until January 8. The division aided in the recapture the city of Esztergom two days earlier, which had been under the Red Army's 3rd Ukrainian Front for just over a fortnight.

Launching an attack from Esztergom on January 9, the force trying to defend Hungary made their way to Budapest. They were stalled by Soviet shelling from the Danube, reaching as far as Dobogókő, which the 711th recaptured.

Now part of the 6th Army's I Cavalry Corps, the division was joined by remnants of the Hungarian 1st Hussar Division and the 6th Panzer Division. The 6th Army's commander, General Hermann Balck, informed Army Group South's high command that he was sending the corps over to aid the IX Mountain Corps, envisioning a joint-strike of the 711th and 96th Infantry Divisions with the Panzer Division; however, he grossly-misjudged the number of tanks the 6th Panzer Division was equipped with in comparison to the number of tanks needed. Even worse, the Red Army's 2nd Mechanized Corps was approaching their position.

=== Czechoslovakia ===
In a shake-up of the 8th Army, a detachment of the division, "Kampfgruppe 711. Infanterie-Division" was transferred into this unit along with LXXII Corps on April 12.

Lieutenant General Reichert ceased to command the division on 14 April when he was injured in an automobile accident. With the chain of command breaking, colonels von Watzdorf and von Bosse were all that remained to take charge of the remnants, which had again been transferred to a new unit in March, XXIV Corps of the 1st Panzer Army. The division finally surrendered two months later on May 9, 1945, just east of Prague.

== Commanders ==
- Major General Dietrich von Reinersdorff-Paczensky und Tenczin (28 Apr 1941 – 1 Apr 1942)
- Major General Wilhelm Haverkamp (1 Apr 1942 – 15 July 1942)
- Lieutenant General Friedrich-Wilhelm Deutsch (15 July 1942 – 1 Apr 1943)
- Lieutenant General Josef Reichert (1 Mar 1943 – 14 Apr 1945)
- Colonel von Watzdorf (Apr 1945)
- Colonel Jobst von Bosse (Apr 1945)
