= 363rd Infantry Division =

- 363. Infanterie-Division
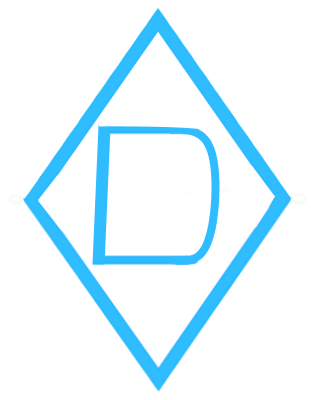
- Active: 28 December 1943 – August 1944
- Country: Nazi Germany
- Branch: Army (Wehrmacht)
- Type: Infantry
- Size: Division
- Engagements: Falaise pocket

The 363rd Infantry Division (German: 363. Infanterie-Division) was an infantry division of the Heer, the ground forces of Nazi Germany, during World War II. It was active from December 1943 to August 1944.

== History ==
The 363rd Infantry Division was formed on 28 December 1943 (in response to a directive on 15 December) as an infantry division of the 21st wave of deployment. Assembled in the General Government, its core personnel was mainly drawn from former members of the 339th Infantry Division. It initially consisted of the Grenadier Regiments 957, 958 and 959, each with two battalions for a total of six infantry battalions in the division, as well as the Division Fusilier Battalion 363 and the Artillery Regiment 363, the latter with three detachments, as well as various divisional support units. The division was sent on 4 March 1944, still during its assembly, to Schieratz training camp in German-occupied Poland before being rerouted to German-occupied Denmark. After the beginning of the Western Allied Operation Overlord on 6 June 1944, the 363rd Infantry Division was rushed to France, where it was destroyed in the Falaise pocket. Throughout the division's tenure of service, the divisional commander was August Dettling.

The division was partially reassembled through the creation of the 363rd Volksgrenadier Division (formerly 566th Volksgrenadier Division) on 17 September 1944.
