= 59th Infantry Division (Wehrmacht) =

Military unit during World War II

- 59. Infanterie-Division
- Active: June 1944 - April 1945
- Country: Germany
- Branch: Army
- Type: Grenadier Infantry
- Role: Infantry
- Size: Division
- Garrison/HQ: Wehrkreis II
- Engagements: World War II

The 59th Infantry Division (German: 59. Infanteriedivision) was a military division of the Wehrmacht during World War II.

== History ==
In the immediate wake of the Allied landings in Normandy and the 1944 Soviet summer offensive, the Wehrmacht was in dire need of manpower. As a result, the 27th mobilization wave created five new but adhoc infantry divisions, mainly consisting of troops on furlough. The 59th Infantry Division was one of these, and initially formed at the Gross-Born Troop Maneuver Area on June 26, 1944. It saw action on the Western Front. It had a serious equipment and training shortage due to its quick formation.

The division was initially assigned to the 15th Army and posted to the Dunkirk area around August 20, 1944. After the 15th Army was cut off along the English Channel coast by the capture of Antwerp by Allied forces behind them, the Germans left behind garrisons in the coastal ports as "fortresses" to be defended to the end. On August 30, the division contributed Lieutenant Colonel Ludwig Schroeder to command the Calais fortress, and possibly additional troops, as it and the rest of 15th Army withdrew from the coast. The division was evacuated across the Scheldt estuary, via Walcheren to Brabant in the Netherlands.

On September 17, the division was located around Boxtel and its strength was reported at approximately 1,000 infantry with some artillery and anti-tank support. During this retreat, it was fortuitously situated close to the initial airborne landings of Operation Market Garden and immediately committed to defend against it. The division mainly fought the American 101st Airborne Division in the area immediately north of Eindhoven between Son and Shijndel. After Market-Garden, the Division continued to oppose Allied advances in this area, including assaults by the XII British Corps from the South through October and the early part of November. After this, the Division was withdrawn, refitted and was back in action around Aachen by December 1944.

In February 1945 the division was stationed on the Rhine. It fought in the Battle of the Ruhr and was in the Ruhr pocket when it surrendered to the Allies in April, 1945.

== Organization ==
Organization of the division in June 1944:

- 1034th Grenadier Regiment
- 1035th Grenadier Regiment
- 1036th Grenadier Regiment
- 159th Artillery Regiment
- 59th Fusilier Battalion
- 159th Tank Destroyer Battalion
- 159th Engineer Battalion
- 159th Signal Battalion
- 159th Divisional Supply Group

== Commanders ==
The division's commanders were :

- Generalleutnant Walter Poppe (July 1944 - February 1945)
- Generalleutnant Hans Kurt Hoecker (February - April 1945)
