= Army Group D =

- German: Heeresgruppe D
- Active: 26 October 1940 – 1945
- Country: Nazi Germany
- Branch: Heer ( Wehrmacht)

Commanders
- Notable commanders: Erwin von Witzleben; Gerd von Rundstedt; Günther von Kluge; Walter Model; Albert Kesselring

Army Group D (German: Heeresgruppe D) was a German Army Group which saw action during World War II.

Army Group D was formed on 26 October 1940 in France, its initial cadre coming from the disbanded Army Group C.

On 15 April 1941, the status of Army Group D was upgraded. From that date on, the commander of Army Group D was also to be considered Oberbefehlshaber West (or OB WEST – the Commander in Chief for the Western Theatre). As a result of this, Army Group D is sometimes incorrectly referred to as Army Group West.

== Commanders ==
No.	Portrait	Name	Took office	Left office	Time in office
1	Erwin von Witzleben	Generalfeldmarschall; Erwin von Witzleben (1881–1944)	25 October 1940	15 March 1942	348 days
2	Gerd von Rundstedt	Generalfeldmarschall; Gerd von Rundstedt (1875–1953)	15 March 1942	2 July 1944	2 years, 109 days
3	Günther von Kluge	Generalfeldmarschall; Günther von Kluge (1882–1944)	2 July 1944	15 August 1944	44 days
(2)	Gerd von Rundstedt	Generalfeldmarschall; Gerd von Rundstedt (1875–1953)	15 August 1944	11 March 1945	208 days
4	Albert Kesselring	Generalfeldmarschall; Albert Kesselring (1885–1960)	11 March 1945	22 April 1945	42 days

== Orders of battle ==
=== May 1941 ===
- Seventh Army
- First Army
- Fifteenth Army
- Commander of all German troops of Occupation in the Netherlands

=== May 1944 ===
- Army Group G
- Army Group B
- Panzer Group West
- First Fallschirm Army

=== December 1944 ===
- Army Group G
- Army Group B
- Army Group H
- Sixth SS Panzer Army
