= 1st Parachute Army =

- German: 1. Fallschirm-Armee
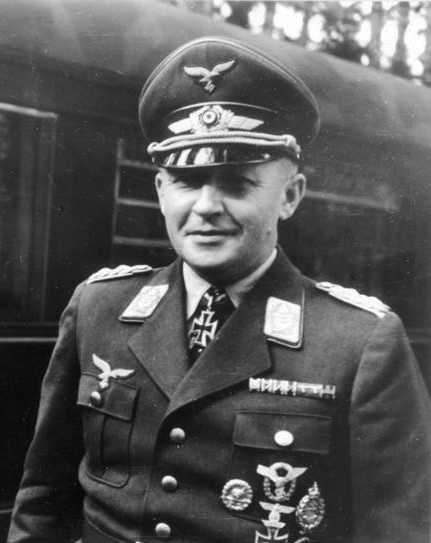
- General Kurt Student commanded the 1st Parachute Army during the Allied Operation Market Garden
- Active: September 1944 – 5 May 1945
- Disbanded: 5 May 1945
- Country: Nazi Germany
- Branch: Luftwaffe
- Size: 30,000 in September, 1944
- Engagements: Western Front

Commanders
- Notable commanders: Generaloberst Kurt Student

The 1st Parachute Army (German: 1. Fallschirm-Armee) was a combined forces between airborne forces (Fallschirmjäger), armoured, and mechanized infantry unit of German Army, formed in September, 1944, comprising 30,000 men.

== History ==
Its first commander was Colonel General Kurt Student, the Wehrmacht's airborne pioneer. During the Allied Operation Market Garden, Student's men delayed the Allied advance across the south of the Netherlands. The 30,000 soldiers were likely the only combat-ready reserve forces in Germany at the time. However, only two of the Army's units were paratrooper divisions.

Student was transferred to the Eastern Front, and on 18 November 1944, command of the First Parachute Army passed to General der Fallschirmtruppe Alfred Schlemm, who opposed the Canadian First Army during the Battle of the Reichswald.

The Canadian First Army and Lieutenant-General William Hood Simpson’s Ninth Army compressed Schlemm’s forces into a small bridgehead on the west bank of the Rhine opposite Wesel. On 10 March 1945, the rearguard of the 1st Parachute Army evacuated their bridgehead, destroying the bridge behind them. Schlemm was wounded in an air attack on his command post at Haltern eleven days later and on 20 March 1945, command passed to General Günther Blumentritt.

Just before Operation Varsity, First Parachute Army had three corps stationed along the river;

- II Parachute Corps to the north,
- LXXXVI Corps in the centre,
- LXIII Corps in the south.

Of these formations, II Parachute Corps and LXXXVI Corps had a shared boundary which ran through the proposed landing-zones for the Allied airborne divisions, meaning that the leading formation of each corps would face the airborne assault operations — these being 7th Parachute Division and 84th Infantry Division. After their retreat to the Rhine both divisions were under-strength and did not number more than 4,000 men each, with 84th Infantry Division supported by only 50 or so medium artillery pieces. In the final days of the war, command passed once more to Student (10 April) and finally to Erich Straube.

== Commanding officers ==
No.	Portrait	Commander	Took office	Left office	Time in office
1	Kurt Student	Generaloberst; Kurt Student (1890–1978)	1 March 1944	4 November 1944	248 days
2	Alfred Schlemm	General der Fallschirmtruppe; Alfred Schlemm (1894–1986)	4 November 1944	28 March 1945	144 days
3	Günther Blumentritt	General der Infanterie; Günther Blumentritt (1892–1967)	28 March 1945	10 April 1945	13 days
(1)	Kurt Student	Generaloberst; Kurt Student (1890–1978)	10 April 1945	28 April 1945	18 days
4	Erich Straube	General der Infanterie; Erich Straube (1887–1971)	28 April 1945	8 May 1945	10 days

== Subunits ==
- German 1st Parachute Corps
- German 2nd Parachute Corps
