= 159th Infantry Division (Wehrmacht) =

Division No. 159 159th Division 159th Reserve Division 159th Infantry Division
- German: Division Nr. 159; 159. Division; 159. Reserve-Division; 159. Infanterie-Division
- Active: August 1939 – February 1945
- Country: Nazi Germany
- Branch: Army (Wehrmacht)
- Type: Infantry
- Size: Division
- Engagements: Case Anton, 1942; Operation Nordwind, 1945; Colmar Pocket, 1945

Commanders
- Notable commanders: Hermann Meyer-Rabingen; Friedrich-Wilhelm Dernen

The 159th Infantry Division (German: 159. Infanterie-Division) was an infantry division of the German Heer during World War II. The unit, at times designated Commander of Reserve Troops IX (German: Kommandeur der Ersatztruppen IX), 159th Division (German: 159. Division), Division No. 159 (German: Division Nr. 159), and 159th Reserve Division (German: 159. Reserve-Division), was active between 1939 and 1945.

== History ==
=== Previous formations ===
The Commander of Reserve Troops IX was formed in Kassel as part of German general mobilization on 26 August 1939. Its initial purpose was to form a command staff for reserve units in the ninth Wehrkreis (military district). This military district was headquartered in Kassel and included most of Hesse as well as parts of Thuringia. The 159th Division was formed as a result of the redesignation of the Commander of Reserve Troops IX on 9 November 1939. The 159th Division was redesignated Division No. 159 on 1 January 1940. The division was deployed from Kassel to Frankfurt am Main on 11 January 1940.

=== 159th Reserve Division ===
The Division No. 159 was split in two as a result of the restructuring of the Replacement Army on 1 October 1942. While one part of the division became the 189th Reserve Division, the rest retained the ordinal number 159 and became the 159th Reserve Division. Subsequently, it was made ready for its first deployment outside of Germany.

The division was placed under the supervision of the LXVI Army Corps and deployed to Bourg in France. The division consisted of the Reserve Infantry Regiments 214 (nicknamed Brunhilde, infantry battalions 106, 367, 388) and 251 (infantry battalions 36, 81, 205, 471). The Brunhilde Reserve Infantry Regiment 214, now designated Grenadier Regiment 870, was soon passed to the 356th Infantry Division. In turn, the 159th Reserve Division received the Reserve Grenadier Regiment 9 from the 189th Reserve Division. In November 1942, the 159th Reserve Division, which now consisted of the Reserve Grenadier Regiments 9, 52 and 251, participated in Case Anton, the de facto annexation of Vichy France by Germany.

In December 1943, the 159th Reserve Division consisted of the following units:

- Reserve Grenadier Regiment 9, Lyon
- Reserve Grenadier Regiment 251, St Etienne
- Reserve Artillery Detachment 9, Valbonne
- Reserve Pioneer Battalion 15, Tournon
- Reserve Division Supply Leader 1059, Bourg

=== 159th Infantry Division ===
On 9 October 1944, the army command of the 19th Army ordered the remainders of the 159th Reserve Division reorganized into an infantry division of the 32nd Aufstellungswelle.

The planned composition for the 159th Infantry Division in October 1944 consisted of the following units:

- Grenadier Regiment 1209, formerly Reserve Grenadier Regiment 9
- Grenadier Regiment 1210, formerly Reserve Grenadier Regiment 251
- Grenadier Regiment 1211
- Fusilier Company 159, later Division Fusilier Battalion 159
- Artillery Regiment 1059
- Panzerjäger Detachment 1059
- Pioneer Battalion 1059
- Intelligence Battalion 1059
- Field Replacement Battalion 1059
- Supply Units 1059

This planned strength was never fully realized, as the retreat from France resulted in constant attrition and combat losses. Furthermore, the Regiment 1211 was not fully deployed until January 1945, weeks before the division's destruction.

The 159th Infantry Division, which had participated in Operation Nordwind in January 1945, was trapped in the Colmar Pocket starting on 20 January and destroyed by early February.

== Superior formations ==
Between February 1943 and March 1945, the 159th Reserve Division and 159th Reserve Infantry Division were subordinate to the following formations:

=== 159th Reserve Division ===
- February 1943: LXXX Army Corps, 1st Army, Army Group D.
- March 1943 – August 1943: Reserves, Army Group D.
- September 1943 – January 1944: LXVI Army Corps, Army Group D.
- February 1944 – June 1944: LXXXVI Army Corps, 1st Army, Army Group D.
- July 1944: LXIV Army Corps, 1st Army, Army Group D.
- August 1944: LXIV Army Corps, Army Group G.
- September 1944: IV Luftwaffe Field Corps, 19th Army, Army Group G.

=== 159th Infantry Division ===
- October 1944 – November 1944: LXXXV Army Corps, 19th Army, Army Group G.
- December 1944: LXIII Army Corps, 19th Army, Army Group G.
- January 1945: LXIII Army Corps, 19th Army, Army Group Upper Rhine.
- February 1945: XVIII SS Corps, 19th Army, Army Group G.
- March 1945 (only on paper): Under supervision of Oberbefehlshaber West.

== Noteworthy individuals ==
- Albert Fett, divisional commander (26 August 1939).
- Friedrich-Karl von Wachter, divisional commander (22 January 1942).
- Karl Sachs, divisional commander (1 March 1942).
- Hermann Meyer-Rabingen, divisional commander (20 September 1942).
- Axel Schmidt, divisional commander (20 June 1944).
- Albin Nake, divisional commander (8 September 1944).
- Friedrich-Wilhelm Dernen, divisional commander (10 October 1944).
- Heinrich Bürcky, divisional commander (15 November 1944).
- Obfähnr. G. Müller, staff and personnel of Panzergrenadier-Regiment 159
