= 15th Infantry Division (Wehrmacht) =

- Active: 1 October 1934 – 5 September 1944; 17 October 1944 – 5 May 1945
- Country: Nazi Germany
- Branch: Army
- Type: Infantry
- Size: Division
- Garrison/HQ: Würzburg
- Engagements: Battle of France; Siege of Mogilev; Battle of Smolensk; Yelnya Offensive; Battle of Moscow; Third Battle of Kharkov; Nikopol–Krivoi Rog Offensive; Odessa Offensive; Second Jassy–Kishinev Offensive

Insignia
- Early vehicle identifier

The 15th Infantry Division (German: 15. Infanterie-Division) was an infantry division of the German Army during the interwar period and World War II, active from 1934 to 1945.

The division was formed on 1 October 1934 in Würzburg under the cover name Artillerieführer V. With the announcement of German rearmament, the division was renamed on 15 October 1935. Mobilized on 25 August 1939, the division took part in the Invasion of Poland in the same year and the Battle of France in 1940. On 21 November 1940 one third of its personnel was used to create the 113th Infantry Division. The division was one of the units taking part in the Second Battle of Kharkov from February till March 1943. The division was destroyed in August 1944 during the Soviet Second Jassy–Kishinev Offensive. In October 1944 a new 15. Infanterie-Division was raised near Cluj-Napoca using the remainders of the old division and new recruits. On 5 May 1945 the division surrendered to the Red Army at Brod.

== History ==
The division was formed on 2 October 1934 in Würzburg under the cover designation of Artillerieführer V to conceal the expansion of the German Army. With the announcement of German rearmament, it was renamed the 15th Infantry Division on 15 October 1935 before being relocated to Frankfurt in Wehrkreis IX on 1 October 1936. The 15th included the 81st Infantry Regiment at Frankfurt, the 88th Infantry Regiment at Hanau, the 106th Infantry Regiment at Aschaffenburg, and the 51st Artillery Regiment at Fulda. The division was mobilized for World War II on 25 August 1939 with the 81st, 88th, and 106th Infantry Regiments, the 51st Artillery Regiment, and support troops. By mobilization, the 81st and 106th Regiments both gained an additional battalion. The 51st included the three battalions of the 15th Artillery Regiment and one battalion of the 51st Artillery Regiment.

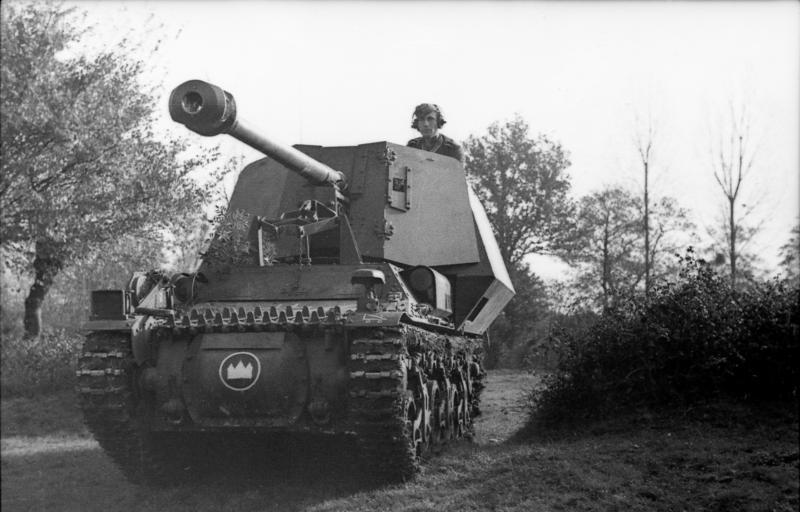
A Marder I tank destroyer of the division in southern France, 1942

After being mobilized, the 15th was assigned to XII Army Corps of the 1st Army of Army Group C, and covered the Franco-German border on the Saar. It was transferred to the reserve of the 16th Army of Army Group A in December. The divisional replacement battalion was used to form the 3rd Battalion of the 392nd Infantry Regiment of the 169th Infantry Division in January 1940, and a month later the 2nd Battalion of the 81st Infantry Regiment was used to form the 1st Battalion of the 530th Infantry Regiment of the 299th Infantry Division. In early 1940 the division moved forward to Trier before advancing into Luxembourg when the Battle of France began on 10 May. In June the division fought at Reims and Nevers during Case Red as part of the VI Army Corps of the 2nd Army. After France surrendered, the 15th remained there as part of the occupation force, assigned to the XXVII Army Corps of the 12th Army (transferred to 1st Army in September). After a battalion from each infantry regiment went to the 134th Infantry Division at Grafenwöhr on 20 November, the division received new battalions to replace the transferred units, but these were soon used to form the 260th Infantry Regiment of the 113th Infantry Division. The headquarters of the 51st Artillery Regiment was renumbered as that of the 15th on 1 February 1941.

Transferred to the Eastern Front in July, the division joined XXXV Army Corps, under the direct control of Army Group Centre, to reduce the encircled Soviet troops around Minsk and participated in the Siege of Mogilev. The 15th went on to fight in the Battle of Smolensk during August as part of the XXXXVI Army Corps of the 2nd Panzer Group. It became part of the IX Army Corps of the 4th Army, facing the Soviet Yelnya Offensive in September. The division participated in the encirclement of Soviet forces around Vyazma when Operation Typhoon began the Battle of Moscow in October as part of the XX Army Corps of the army. The division was transferred to the XII Army Corps in November and December before returning to XX Corps in January 1942 for battles near Yukhnov. After fighting in the Gzhatsk sector from February as part of the XX, VII, and V Army Corps of the 4th Panzer Army, the division was withdrawn to France to rebuild in May after temporarily disbanded five battalions due to losses. In a propaganda move, the infantry regiments of the division were renamed grenadier regiments along with all German infantry regiments on 15 October 1942.

In France, the division was assigned to LXXX Army Corps of the 1st Army. After almost a year out of combat, the 15th returned to the Eastern Front during the Third Battle of Kharkov in March 1943, joining LVII Army Corps of the 4th Panzer Army of Army Group South. With LVII Army Corps, the division transferred to the 1st Panzer Army in April, fighting in the Donets and Izyum sectors for the next several months. It retreated from the Soviet advance beginning in August and was transferred to the XXX Army Corps of the army in October, fighting in the Krivoy Rog sector, returning to LVII Corps in December. As a result of losses, on 2 October the grenadier regiments were reduced to two battalions. The divisional alarm detachment also became its fusilier battalion. The division was shifted back to XXX Corps, now with the 6th Army, in January 1944, and retreated in the face of the Soviet Nikopol–Krivoi Rog Offensive in February, when it returned to LVII Corps, which also transferred to 6th Army. While countering the Uman–Botoșani Offensive, the division transferred to the army's XXIX Army Corps in March. Back with XXX Army Corps from April, the division fought in Romania and was destroyed in the Second Jassy–Kishinev Offensive in August 1944.

The division was reformed on 4 October 1944 at Cluj-Napoca from the remnants of the division, which had fought as Kampfgruppe Winkler. Assigned to the Hungarian II Corps of 8th Army, the division fought in north Hungary for the rest of the year. It was in army reserve in November before returning to the XXIX Army Corps a month later. In December, the 1236th Grenadier (School) Regiment from Wiener Neustadt replaced the 81st Regiment, which was detached to the Hungarian 1st Army, and in March 1945 the 1236th was renumbered as the 81st. Retreating into the Tatra Mountains of Slovakia in January, the division fought with the corps, transferred to 1st Panzer Army of the reformed Army Group Centre, in April near Žilina. It retreated into Moravia in May, now with XXIV Army Corps, and surrendered to Soviet troops at Brod at the end of the war.

== Organization (1939) ==
- Infanterie-Regiment 81 (Stab, I.-III.)
- Infanterie-Regiment 88 (Stab, I.-III.)
- Infanterie-Regiment 106 (Stab, I.-III.)
- Artillerie-Regiment 15 (I.-III.)
- Artillerie-Regiment 51 (Stab., I.)
- Beobachtungs-Abteilung 15
- Aufklärungs-Abteilung 15
- Panzerabwehr-Abteilung 15
- Pionier-Bataillon 15
- Infanterie-Divisions-Nachrichten-Abteilung 15
- Feldersatz-Bataillon 15
- Infanterie-Divisions-Nachschubführer 15

== Commanders ==
- General der Artillerie Fritz Brandt 1 October 1934 - 31 March 1936
- Generalleutnant Emil Leeb 1 April 1936 - 1 April 1939
- Generalmajor Walter Behschnitt 1 April 1939 - 6 October 1939
- Generalleutnant Friedrich-Wilhelm von Chappuis 6 October 1939 - 12 August 1940
- Generalleutnant Ernst-Eberhard Hell 12 August 1940 - 8 January 1942
- Oberst Alfred Schreiber 8 January 1942 - 3 February 1942
- Generalmajor Bronislaw Pawel 3 February 1942 - 18 Juni 1942
- Generalleutnant Erich Buschenhagen 18 June 1942 - 20 November 1943
- Generalmajor Rudolf Sperl 20 November 1943 - August 1944
- Oberst Ottomar Babel 14 August - 5 September 1944 (missing)

=== 2nd formation ===
- Generalmajor Siegfried von Rekowski (cancelled)
- Generalmajor Hanns Laengenfelder 17 October 1944 - 5 May 1945
