= 331st Infantry Division =

- German: 331. Infanterie-Division
- Active: 15 December 1941 – 30 December 1943 16 March 1944 – 7 October 1944
- Country: Nazi Germany
- Branch: Heer
- Type: Infantry
- Size: Division

The 331st Infantry Division was an infantry division of the German army during World War II. It was active between 1941 and 1944, with a brief period of inactivity between 30 December 1943 and 16 March 1944.

== Operational history ==
=== Formation ===
The 331st Infantry Division was assembled as one of the valkyrie divisions of the 17th wave of deployment on 15 December 1941. Initially deployed at Königsbrück military base using personnel of Division 174 (later 174th Reserve Division), it consisted of the Infantry Regiments 557, 558 and 559, as well as Artillery Regiment 331 and the Division Units 331. Infantry Regiment 557 initially consisted of three infantry battalions, whereas the 558th and 559th regiments had two battalions each, for a divisional total of seven infantry battalions. Artillery Regiment 331 was equipped with two artillery detachments. The initial divisional commander was Fritz Hengen, but command quickly passed to Franz Beyer, who oversaw the division between 30 December 1941 and 22 February 1943.

=== 1942 ===
The division marched from Łuków to the Eastern Front on foot between January and February 1942, where it was placed under XXXX Corps (4th Army, Army Group Center) and was active in the Yukhnov area. Here, the division suffered very heavy casualties almost immediately upon entering combat against the Red Army, making its first enemy contact in late January 1941, reinforcing 4th Army troops under pressure by the Soviet 1941–42 winter offensive.

The division remained under XXXX Corps in March and April, before spending time under LVI Corps between May and December. Between May and June, the division was reorganized and several new formations added: Panzerjäger Detachment 331, Reconnaissance Detachment 331, and an additional artillery detachment for Artillery Regiment 331, bringing the regiment to three detachments. Over the course of the fighting of the year 1942, the 3rd Battalion of Infantry Regiment 557 had to be dissolved.

=== 1943 ===
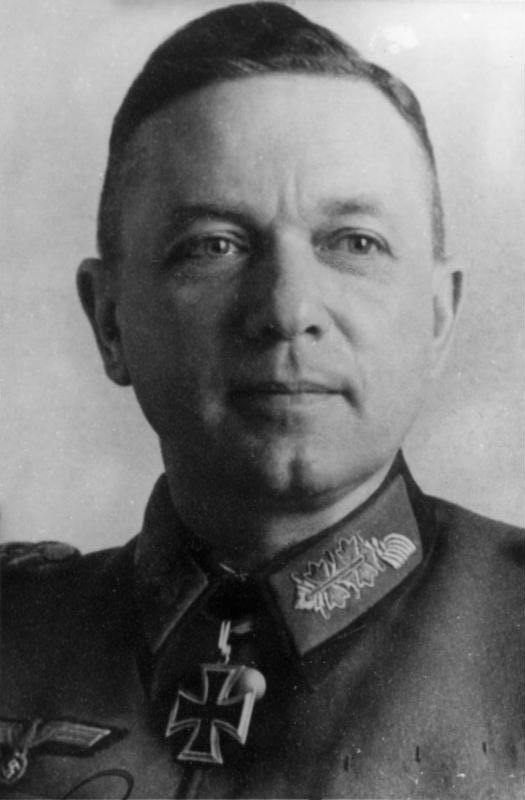
Karl Rhein commanded the 331st Infantry Division between February 1943 and January 1944 and again between April and August 1944.

In January 1943, the 331st Infantry Division was shifted from the Yukhnov sector to Velizh, where the division was subordinate to LIX Corps of 3rd Panzer Army in February 1943. Between March and April, the division served under XXXXIII Corps (also 3rd Panzer Army). On 22 February 1943, divisional command passed from Beyer to Karl Rhein, who held the command post until 1 January 1944 and briefly reassumed it between April and August 1944. On 17 March 1943, the 557th regiment was fully dissolved and its two remaining battalions given to the 558th and 559th, resulting in a division of two infantry regiments with a total of six battalions. This design was later reverted on 22 September 1943, and the 558th and 559th regiments each gave their third battalions back to a newly formed 557th regiment, preparing a reorganization of the division to fit the Division Neuer Art 44 archetype. The 331st Infantry Division was assigned to II Corps of 16th Army under Army Group North in the Nevel sector between May 1943 and February 1944. Additionally, the Infantry Regiments were redesignated Grenadier Regiments, as was the case for all Infantry Regiments of the German army in 1943.

After heavy casualties in the Nevel sector, the division was ordered on 30 December 1943 to be temporarily dissolved and subsequently reassembled as a division of the 24th wave of deployment using the resources of Wahn Division. The infantry as well as the military equipment remained on the Eastern Front. Grenadier Regiment 557 was dissolved outright, Grenadier Regiment 558 was redesignated Grenadier Regiment 547 and attached to the 83rd Infantry Division, and Grenadier Regiment 559 saw its battalions dissolved, whereas the staff went on to form the staff of Grenadier Regiment 358 of the 205th Infantry Division.

=== 1944 ===
The 331st Infantry Division was reactivated on 16 March 1944 in Köln-Wahn (in Porz Borough of Cologne), using the personnel of Wahn Division. The new 331st Infantry Division was once again equipped with three grenadier regiments, bearing the previous division's regimental numbers 557, 558 and 559. The personnel of the new Grenadier Regiment 557 was drawn from Grenadier Regiment 567 of the 391st Field Training Division, whereas the new Grenadier Regiments 558 and 559 were the renamed Grenadier Regiments 1 Wahn and 2 Wahn of the previous Wahn Division. The new Artillery Regiment 331, with four detachments, was drawn from both the old regiment of the 331st Division and from the materiel of Division Wahn. Division Fusilier Battalion 331 was a new creation, and Pioneer Battalion 331 was a redesignation of the Pioneer Battalion of Division Wahn.

Starting in April 1944, the 331st Infantry Division was deployed in German-occupied France, where it was initially assigned to the army reserves of 15th Army in the Calais region. After the Allied Normandy landings in June, the 331st Infantry Division was assigned to LXXIV Army Corps under 5th Panzer Army of Army Group B. The division was involved in the peripheral fights around the Falaise pocket in late August 1944, suffering casualties during breakthrough attempts. During the retreat, LXXIV Corps covered the Londe-Rouvray Forest south of Rouen to enable armored elements of LXXXI Corps to withdraw. The 331st Infantry Division, according to statements of its commander Walter Steinmüller (in command between 1 August and 16 October 1944) in official Canadian war histories, was one of the final formations to cross the river Seine in the early morning hours of 30 August 1944.

Divisional remnants appear in German records under command of LXVII Corps (15th Army, Army Group B) for the duration of September 1944.

=== Dissolution ===
The 331st Infantry Division was formally dissolved on 7 October 1944. Remaining staff personnel formed a z.b.V. divisional staff on 13 November. The 2nd Battalion of Grenadier Regiment 558 became the 2nd Battalion of Grenadier Regiment 857 under 346th Infantry Division. The 1st and 2nd Detachments of Artillery Regiment 331 became the 1st and 2nd Detachments of Artillery Regiment 346 (also 346th Infantry Division), whereas the 3rd Detachment of Artillery Regiment 331 became the 3rd Detachment of Artillery Regiment 168 (under 168th Infantry Division).

The z.b.V. divisional staff continued service between November 1944 and March 1945. After an initial attachment to 15th Army of Army Group B, it spent the final months of activity with LXXXVIII Corps of 25th Army under Army Group H.

== Organizational history ==
Superior formations of the 331st Infantry Division, 1941–1945
Year	Month	Army Corps	Army	Army Group	Operational area
1941	Dec	In deployment			Wehrkreis VI (Königsbrück)
1942	Jan/Feb	Army Group reserves		AG Centre	via Łuków to the front
1942	Mar/Apr	XXXX	4th	AG Centre	Yukhnov
1942	May–Dec	LVI	4th	AG Centre	Yukhnov
1943	Jan	Army Group reserves		AG Centre	Yukhnov
1943	Feb	LIX	3rd Panzer	AG Centre	Velizh
1943	Mar/Apr	XXXXIII	3rd Panzer	AG Centre	Velizh
1943	May–Dec	II	16th	AG North	Nevel
1944	Jan/Feb (remnants)	II	16th	AG North	Nevel
Dissolution and reassembly ordered on 30 December 1943; reassembly on 16 March 1944
1944	Mar	Reassembly in process			Köln-Wahn
1944	Apr–Jun	Army reserves	15th	AG B / AG D	Calais
1944	Aug	LXXIV	5th Panzer	AG B	Normandy
1944	Sep (remnants)	LXVII	15th	AG B	Netherlands
Dissolution ordered on 7 October 1944; z.b.V. staff continues until March 1945
1944	Nov	Army reserves	15th	AG B	Netherlands
1945	Feb/Mar	LXXXVIII	25th	AG H	Netherlands

== Noteworthy individuals ==
- Franz Beyer, divisional commander between 30 December 1941 and 22 February 1943.
- Erich Diestel, commander of z.b.V. staff starting 16 October 1944.
- Heinz Furbach, divisional commander between 1 January and 25 April 1944.
- Fritz Hengen, divisional commander between 15 December and 30 December 1941.
- Karl Rhein, divisional commander between 22 February 1943 and 1 January 1944 and between 25 April and 1 August 1944.
- Walter Steinmüller, divisional commander between 1 August and 16 October 1944.
