= LXXX Army Corps =

The LXXX Army Corps (German: LXXX. Armeekorps) was an army corps of the German Wehrmacht during World War II.

== Operational history ==
The LXXX Army Corps was created on 27 May 1942 in the Poitiers sector in the west of occupied France. Its staff was formed from the Höheres Kommando z. b. V. XXXI and the corps was initially subordinate to the 1st Army under Army Group D. The initial commander of the corps was Curt Gallenkamp, who had already led the Höheres Kommando since 1940. Initially, the corps consisted of four infantry divisions (15th, 327th, 708th, 715th) and the 7th Panzer Division.

From its headquarters in Poitiers, the LXXX Army Corps defended a coastal sector of the Bay of Biscay around La Rochelle. For example, the LXXX Army Corps commanded the 158th Infantry Division at Fontenay-le-Comte and the 708th Infantry Division at Royan on 24 April 1943.

The corps remained on defensive duty in France until the Normandy landings of 6 June 1944. When the Allied forces invaded France, the LXXX Army Corps consisted of the 158th and 708th Infantry Divisions. The headquarters of the two divisions were, just like on 24 April 1943, still at Fontenay-le-Comte and Royan, respectively.

Gallenkamp was relieved of command on 7 August 1944. Franz Beyer assumed command of the corps on 10 August 1944.

By 15 September 1944, the German forces in the west had been pushed back all the way to Germany. The LXXX Army Corps took a position north of the Moselle river, flanked by the I SS Panzer Corps to the north and the LXXXII Army Corps to the south. This remained largely unchanged until mid December, as the Allied forces did not make significant progress in the Ardennes region between September and December 1944. The LXXX Army Corps was transferred from the 1st Army, under which it had served since its inception in May 1942, to the 7th Army in October 1944.

Starting on 16 December 1944, the German Ardennes Offensive began just north of the positions of the LXXX Army Corps. While the I SS Panzer Corps, LXXXV Army Corps, XLVII Panzer Corps, LXVI Army Corps and LVIII Panzer Corps all made significant territorial gains during the Battle of the Bulge, the LXXX Army Corps did not greatly shift its position, merely advancing from the Sauer to the Alzette. It stood opposite to the XII U.S. Corps. Most of the German gains further northwest were undone by the Allied counterattack by 17 January 1945, and the situation in the sector of the LXXX Army Corps had been largely unchanged.

In April 1945, as the German armed forces were disintegrating, the LXXX Army Corps was transferred a final time and became part of the 19th Army.

== Organizational structure ==
Organization chart of the 80th Wehrmacht Army Corps
Year	Date	Corps Commander	Subordinate Divisions	Army	Army Commander	Army Group	Army Group Commander	Operational area
1942	8 June	Curt Gallenkamp	15th Infantry, 327th Infantry, 708th Infantry, 715th Infantry, 7th Panzer	1st Army	Johannes Blaskowitz	Army Group D	Gerd von Rundstedt	Poitiers, France
1942	4 July	Curt Gallenkamp	15th Infantry, 327th Infantry, 708th Infantry, 715th Infantry	1st Army	Johannes Blaskowitz	Army Group D	Gerd von Rundstedt	Poitiers, France
1942	5 August	Curt Gallenkamp	15th Infantry, 327th Infantry, 708th Infantry, 715th Infantry	1st Army	Johannes Blaskowitz	Army Group D	Gerd von Rundstedt	Poitiers, France
1942	2 September	Curt Gallenkamp	15th Infantry, 327th Infantry, 708th Infantry, 715th Infantry, 7th Panzer	1st Army	Johannes Blaskowitz	Army Group D	Gerd von Rundstedt	Poitiers, France
1942	8 October	Curt Gallenkamp	15th Infantry, 327th Infantry, 708th Infantry, 715th Infantry, 7th Panzer	1st Army	Johannes Blaskowitz	Army Group D	Gerd von Rundstedt	Poitiers, France
1942	5 November	Curt Gallenkamp	15th Infantry, 327th Infantry, 344th Infantry, 708th Infantry, 715th Infantry	1st Army	Johannes Blaskowitz	Army Group D	Gerd von Rundstedt	Poitiers, France
1942	1 December	Curt Gallenkamp	15th Infantry, 344th Infantry, 708th Infantry, 715th Infantry	1st Army	Johannes Blaskowitz	Army Group D	Gerd von Rundstedt	Poitiers, France
1943	1 January	Curt Gallenkamp	15th Infantry, 708th Infantry	1st Army	Johannes Blaskowitz	Army Group D	Gerd von Rundstedt	Poitiers, France
1943	3 February	Curt Gallenkamp	15th Infantry, 158th Infantry, 708th Infantry	1st Army	Johannes Blaskowitz	Army Group D	Gerd von Rundstedt	Poitiers, France
1943	4 March	Curt Gallenkamp	158th Infantry, 708th Infantry	1st Army	Johannes Blaskowitz	Army Group D	Gerd von Rundstedt	Poitiers, France
1943	9 April	Curt Gallenkamp	158th Infantry, 708th Infantry	1st Army	Johannes Blaskowitz	Army Group D	Gerd von Rundstedt	Poitiers, France
1943	1 May	Curt Gallenkamp	158th Infantry, 708th Infantry	1st Army	Johannes Blaskowitz	Army Group D	Gerd von Rundstedt	Poitiers, France
1943	1 June	Curt Gallenkamp	158th Infantry, 708th Infantry	1st Army	Johannes Blaskowitz	Army Group D	Gerd von Rundstedt	Poitiers, France
1943	7 July	Curt Gallenkamp	158th Infantry, 708th Infantry	1st Army	Johannes Blaskowitz	Army Group D	Gerd von Rundstedt	Poitiers, France
1943	5 August	Curt Gallenkamp	158th Infantry, 708th Infantry	1st Army	Johannes Blaskowitz	Army Group D	Gerd von Rundstedt	Poitiers, France
1943	5 September	Curt Gallenkamp	158th Infantry, 708th Infantry	1st Army	Johannes Blaskowitz	Army Group D	Gerd von Rundstedt	Poitiers, France
1943	4 October	Curt Gallenkamp	158th Infantry, 708th Infantry	1st Army	Johannes Blaskowitz	Army Group D	Gerd von Rundstedt	Poitiers, France
1943	8 November	Curt Gallenkamp	158th Infantry, 708th Infantry	1st Army	Johannes Blaskowitz	Army Group D	Gerd von Rundstedt	Poitiers, France
1943	3 December	Curt Gallenkamp	158th Infantry, 708th Infantry	1st Army	Johannes Blaskowitz	Army Group D	Gerd von Rundstedt	Poitiers, France
1944	1 January	Curt Gallenkamp	158th Infantry, 273rd Infantry, 275th Infantry, 708th Infantry	1st Army	Johannes Blaskowitz	Army Group D	Gerd von Rundstedt	Poitiers, France
1944	12 February	Curt Gallenkamp	158th Infantry, 273rd Infantry, 708th Infantry	1st Army	Johannes Blaskowitz	Army Group D	Gerd von Rundstedt	Poitiers, France
1944	11 March	Curt Gallenkamp	158th Infantry, 273rd Infantry, 708th Infantry	1st Army	Johannes Blaskowitz	Army Group D	Gerd von Rundstedt	Poitiers, France
1944	8 April	Curt Gallenkamp	158th Infantry, 708th Infantry	1st Army	Johannes Blaskowitz	Army Group D	Gerd von Rundstedt	Poitiers, France
1944	11 May	Curt Gallenkamp	158th Infantry, 708th Infantry	1st Army	Joachim Lemelsen	Army Group G	Johannes Blaskowitz	Poitiers, France
1944	12 June	Curt Gallenkamp	158th Infantry, 708th Infantry	1st Army	Kurt von der Chevallerie	Army Group G	Johannes Blaskowitz	Poitiers, France
1944	17 July	Curt Gallenkamp	158th Infantry, 708th Infantry	1st Army	Kurt von der Chevallerie	Army Group G	Johannes Blaskowitz	Poitiers, France
1944	31 August	Franz Beyer	1st SS, 12th SS, 17th SS, 26th SS, 27th SS, Panzer Lehr	1st Army	Kurt von der Chevallerie	Army Group B	Walter Model	Loire / Champagne, France
1944	16 September	Franz Beyer	48th Infantry, Panzer Lehr, 5th Parachute	1st Army	Otto von Knobelsdorff	Army Group G	Johannes Blaskowitz	Metz, France
1944	13 October	Franz Beyer	36th Infantry, 353rd Infantry	7th Army	Erich Brandenberger	Army Group B	Walter Model	Trier
1944	5 November	Franz Beyer	36th Infantry, 353rd Infantry	7th Army	Erich Brandenberger	Army Group B	Walter Model	Trier
1944	26 November	Franz Beyer	212th Infantry, 353rd Infantry	7th Army	Erich Brandenberger	Army Group B	Walter Model	Trier
1944	31 December	Franz Beyer	212th Infantry, 276th Infantry	7th Army	Erich Brandenberger	Army Group B	Walter Model	Trier
1945	19 February	Franz Beyer	212th Infantry, 560th Infantry	7th Army	Erich Brandenberger	Army Group B	Walter Model	Trier
1945	1 March	Franz Beyer	212th Infantry, 560th Infantry	7th Army	Hans Felber	Army Group B	Walter Model	Trier
1945	12 April	Franz Beyer	16th Volksgrenadier, 47th Volksgrenadier, 198th Infantry, 559th Volksgrenadier	19th Army	Erich Brandenberger	directly under OKW	Wilhelm Keitel (OKW)	Upper Rhine

== Noteworthy individuals ==
- Curt Gallenkamp, corps commander of LXXX Army Corps (27 March 1942 – 7 August 1944).
- Franz Beyer, corps commander of LXXX Army Corps (10 August 1944 – 8 May 1945).
