= Panzer corps =

Nazi armoured corps during World War II

A panzer corps (German: Panzerkorps) was an armoured corps type in Nazi Germany's Wehrmacht during World War II. The name was introduced in 1941, when the motorised corps (Armeekorps (mot) or AK(mot)) were renamed to panzer corps. Panzer corps were created throughout the war, and existed in the Army, the Waffen-SS and even the Luftwaffe. Those renamed from ordinary motorised corps retained their numbering.

== Purpose ==
Panzer corps underwent transformation as the war went on. Initially they were the main strike force of the Wehrmacht, and consisted of motorised infantry divisions (ID (mot)) and panzer divisions. Later in the war it was possible to find panzer corps that consisted solely of infantry divisions.

During the initial period of the war the panzer corps predecessor, the motorised corps, were grouped into various panzer groups (Panzergruppen). Panzer groups were named (i.e. not designated with numbers) during the campaigns in Poland, France, and Greece, they were not used at all in Norway and Denmark in 1940, and numbered 1-4 during the first half year of the war against the Soviet Union. In the last case, a panzer group normally consisted of two or three motorized corps. They were the operational movement element of Army Group North, Army Group Centre and Army Group South. The motorized corps served as the tactical command element in the command structure, with the individual divisions serving as tactical combat elements.

== List of panzer corps ==
The following corps were AK(mot) and later Panzerkorps or were set up as Panzerkorps. Wehrmacht formations were designated either with Roman numerals or names:

=== Army ===
- III Panzer Corps
- IV Panzer Corps
- VII Panzer Corps
- XIV Panzer Corps
- XIX Panzer Corps
- XXIV Panzer Corps
- XXXVIII Panzer Corps
- XXXIX Panzer Corps
- XL Panzer Corps
- XXXXI Panzer Corps
- XLVI Panzer Corps
- XLVII Panzer Corps
- XLVIII Panzer Corps
- LVI Panzer Corps
- LVII Panzer Corps
- LVIII Panzer Corps (Germany)
- LXXVI Panzer Corps
- Panzer Corps Feldherrnhalle
- Panzer Corps Grossdeutschland

=== Waffen-SS ===
- I SS Panzer Corps
- II SS Panzer Corps
- III (Germanic) SS Panzer Corps
- IV SS Panzer Corps
- VII SS Panzer Corps

=== Luftwaffe ===
- Parachute Panzer Corps Hermann Göring

== See also ==
- Panzerwaffe
- Armoured Corps
- Military organization
