= Heinrich von Vietinghoff =

German general (1887–1952)

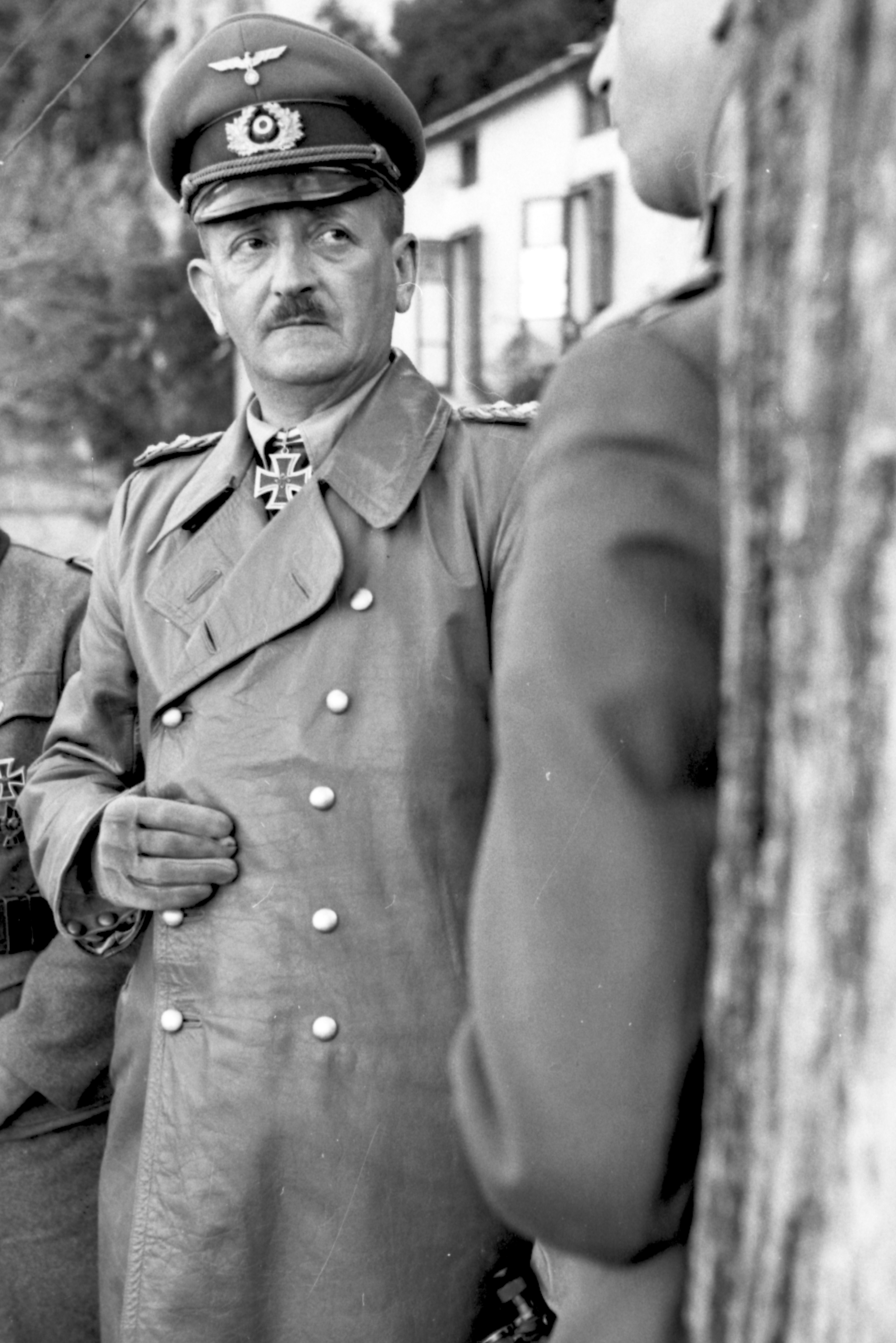
- Generaloberst Vietinghoff in 1944
- Born: 6 December 1887; Mainz, Grand Duchy of Hesse, German Empire
- Died: 23 February 1952 (aged 64); Pfronten, Bavaria, West Germany
- Relatives: ∞ 1920 Elfriede Maria, widowed Schwarzmann, née Wagner; 2 children and 1 stepdaughter
- Military career
- Allegiance: Kingdom of Prussia; German Empire; Weimar Republic; Nazi Germany
- Branch: Prussian Army; Imperial German Army; Reichsheer; German Army
- Service years: 1906–1945
- Rank: Generaloberst
- Commands: XIII Corps; XXXXVI Panzer Corps; 15th Army; 10th Army; Army Group C Army Group Courland
- Conflicts: World War I World War II
- Awards: Knight's Cross of the Iron Cross with Oak Leaves

Heinrich Gottfried Otto Richard von Vietinghoff genannt Scheel (6 December 1887 – 23 February 1952) was a German general (Generaloberst) of the Wehrmacht during World War II. He was a recipient of the Knight's Cross of the Iron Cross with Oak Leaves. Vietinghoff commanded the German troops in German-occupied Italy in 1945.

== Life ==
Heinrich came from the old Westphalian noble family von Vietinghoff. He was the eldest son of the Prussian Lieutenant General of Artillery Heinrich Otto Konrad von Vietinghoff genannt Scheel (1857–1917) and his wife Leona Valeska Angelika Pulcheria, née Gräfin von Schmettow (1861–1942). He had two younger brothers; both were killed in action in World War I.

Heinrich attended elementary school in Glogau and then Dr. Mittelhaus's Private Higher Boys' School in Breslau. He then attended the cadet academies in Wahlstatt and Plön, and finally the Royal Prussian Main Cadet's Institute in Lichterfelde. On 6 March 1906, he received a commendation from Emperor and King Wilhelm I by Imperial Cabinet Order (A.K.O.) "for the knowledge demonstrated in the Abitur examination". On the same day, he was transferred to the Prussian Army as an officer cadet (Fähnrich) and served with the Kaiser Franz Garde-Grenadier-Regiment Nr. 2 in Berlin.

=== Wehrmacht ===
On 24 November 1938, Vietinghoff was appointed commander of the 5th Panzer Division and took part in the invasion of Poland under Wilhelm Ritter von Leeb. He was promoted to General in June 1940 after which he led the German XLVI Panzer Corps in the invasion of Yugoslavia.

During Operation Barbarossa, his Corps was part of Army Group Centre under Field Marshal Fedor von Bock. As did all commanders of the German corps on the Eastern Front during the invasion, Vietinghoff implemented the criminal Commissar Order. Vietinghoff also later served with General Heinz Guderian in the 2nd Panzer Army.

From December 1942 to August 1943, he was Commander-in-Chief of the German Fifteenth Army in France. In Italy from August 1943 he commanded German Tenth Army, which was responsible for the delaying actions through the successive defensive lines built across Italy. Notable in this context were the defences on the Winter Line from November 1943 to May 1944 and the fighting in the autumn of 1944 on the Gothic Line.

In October 1944, he was temporarily raised to overall command in Italy (Army Group C) when Field Marshal Albert Kesselring was seriously injured in a car crash. In January 1945, on Kesselring's return, he left Italy to command Army Group Courland in East Prussia. When Kesselring was moved in March 1945 to command German Army Command West (OB West) in France, Vietinghoff returned as the supreme German commander in Italy.

At the end of April 1945, he made contact with the Allied forces and on 29 April, his representative General Karl Wolff signed on his behalf at the Royal Palace in Caserta the instrument of surrender on 2 May 1945 at noon. Afterwards he spent two and a half years in British captivity at Bridgend Island Farm (Special Camp XI) among high-ranking German prisoners.

After the war Vietinghoff was a member of the expert group dealing with the question of German rearmament. In October 1950 he wrote the Himmerod memorandum, named after the Himmerod Abbey where it was written, on behalf of the Adenauer government, on West German contributions to European defence. He died on 23 February 1952 in Pfronten.

== Promotions ==
- 6 March 1906 Fähnrich (Officer Cadet)
- 27 January 1907 Leutnant (2nd Lieutenant) with Patent from 14 June 1905
- 19 June 1914 Oberleutnant (1st Lieutenant)
- 24 July 1915 Hauptmann (Captain)
- 1 March 1926 Major
- 1 February 1931 Oberstleutnant (Lieutenant Colonel)
- 1 April 1933 Oberst (Colonel)
- 20 April 1936 Generalmajor (Major General) with effect and RDA from 1 April 1936 (10)
- 28 February 1938 Generalleutnant (Lieutenant General) with effect and RDA from 1 March 1938 (8)
- 17 May 1940 General der Panzertruppe with effect and RDA from 1 June 1940 (5)
- 8 October 1943 Generaloberst with effect and RDA from 1 September 1943 (1)

== Awards and decorations ==
- Austrian Order of Franz Joseph, Knight's Cross (ÖFJ4) on 17 May 1910
- Order of the Iron Crown (Austria), Knight III. Class (ÖEK3) on 2 January 1914
- Iron Cross (1914), 2nd and 1st Class
  - 2nd Class on 13 September 1914
  - 1st Class on 23 April 1915
- Military Merit Cross (Austria-Hungary), 3rd Class with the War Decoration (ÖM3K) on 25 July 1915
- War Decoration to his Austrian Order of the Iron Crown Knight III. Class (ÖEK3K/ÖE3K)
- Saxe-Meiningen Cross for Merit in War (SMK) on 2 August 1915
- Saxon Albert Order, Knight 2nd Class with Swords (SA3bX) on 5 July 1917
  - one source states 1st Class with Swords, but this is not documented.
- Lübeck Hanseatic Cross (LübH/LüH) on 11 July 1917
- Grand Duchy of Mecklenburg-Schwerin Military Merit Cross, II. Class (MMV2/MK2) on 17 September 1917
- Order of Military Merit (Bulgaria), Officer (IV. Grade; BMO4/BO4) on 11 October 1917
- Gallipoli Star (TH) on 22 December 1917
- House Order of Hohenzollern, Knight's Cross with Swords (HOH3X) on 26 March 1918
- Wound Badge (1918) in Black on 3 June 1918
- Honour Cross of the World War 1914/1918 with Swords
- Wehrmacht Long Service Award, 4th to 1st Class on 2 October 1936
- Repetition Clasp 1939 to the Iron Cross 1914, 2nd and 1st Class
  - 2nd Class on 21 September 1939
  - 1st Class on 28 September 1939
- German Cross in Gold on 22 April 1942 as General der Panzertruppe and Commanding General of the XXXXVI. Panzer-Korps
- Winter Battle in the East 1941–42 Medal on 15 July 1942
- Knight's Cross of the Iron Cross with Oak Leaves
  - Knight's Cross on 24 June 1940 as General der Panzertruppe and Commanding General of XIII. Armee-Korps
  - 456th Oak Leaves on 16 April 1944 as Generaloberst and Commander-in-Chief of the 10. Armee

== Sources ==
- German Federal Archives: BArch PERS 6/61 and PERS 6/301189

Military offices
Preceded by none	Commander of 5th Panzer Division; 2 September 1939 – 8 October 1939	Succeeded by Generalleutnant Max von Hartlieb-Walsporn
Preceded by General of the Cavalry Maximilian von Weichs	Commander of XIII. Armeekorps; 26 October 1939 - 25 October 1940	Succeeded by General of the Infantry Hans Felber
Preceded by none	Commander of XXXXVI. Armeekorps; 20 June 1940 - 11 June 1942	Succeeded by General of the Infantry Hans Zorn
Preceded by Generaloberst Curt Haase	Commander of 15. Armee; 1 December 1942 – 7 August 1943	Succeeded by Generaloberst Hans von Salmuth
Preceded by Generalfeldmarschall Walter von Reichenau	Commander of 10. Armee; 15 August 1943 – 14 February 1945	Succeeded by General der Panzertruppe Traugott Herr
Preceded by Generalfeldmarschall Albert Kesselring	Commander of Army Group C 26 October 1944 - 15 January 1945(temporary)	Succeeded by Generalfeldmarschall Albert Kesselring
Preceded by Generaloberst Lothar Rendulic	Commander of Army Group Courland; 27 January 1945 – 10 March 1945	Succeeded by Generaloberst Lothar Rendulic
Preceded by Generalfeldmarschall Albert Kesselring	Commander of Army Group C 10 March 1945 – 30 April 1945	Succeeded by General of the InfantryFriedrich Schulz
