= 327th Infantry Division =

- German: 327. Infanterie-Division
- Active: 15 November 1940 – 2 November 1943
- Country: Nazi Germany
- Branch: Army
- Type: Infantry
- Size: Division
- Engagements: Case Anton; Operation Citadel; Lvov–Sandomierz offensive

The 327th Infantry Division (German: 327. Infanterie-Division) was an infantry division of the German Heer during World War II.

== History ==
The 327th Infantry Division was active from 1940 to 1943.

The 327th Infantry Division was formed as an infantry division of the thirteenth Aufstellungswelle on 15 November 1940. The division was assembled in Wehrkreis XVII (Vienna) from seven infantry battalions of the seventh Aufstellungswelle as well as two infantry battalions of the eighth Aufstellungswelle. These battalions were taken from the 183rd, 198th, and 297th Infantry Divisions. The 327th Infantry Division was initially formed from four regiments, including the Infantry Regiments 595, 596, and 597, as well as the Artillery Regiment 397. Additionally, support troops were organized as the Division Units 327. Between November 1940 and April 1941, the 327th Infantry Division was preparing for deployment as part of the Ersatzheer. The initial divisional commander, appointed on 15 November 1940, was Wilhelm Rupprecht.

It was then assigned to the XXVII Army Corps under the 1st Army in Army Group D (OB West), serving along the demarcation line with Vichy France. After service under the XXVII Army Corps from May to September 1941, it was internally reassigned within the 1st Army to the XXXXV General Command, where the division remained from October to November 1941. In December 1941, the 327th Infantry Division was reassigned from the 1st Army to the 7th Army, where it served under the XXV Army Corps in Brittany.

The 327th Infantry Division remained with the 7th Army until May 1942. In January 1942, the division was subjugated to the LIX Army Corps, and to the XXXI Army Corps in February to May 1942. After May 1942, the 327th Infantry Division once more returned to the 1st Army in June 1942, where it served under the LXXX Army Corps on the Atlantic Coast. In November 1942, the 327th Infantry Division participated in Case Anton. The division had been briefly commanded by Theodor Fischer during a few days in October 1942, before he was replaced by Rudolf Friedrich on 10 October 1942.

In January 1943, the 327th Infantry Division served in the LXXXIII Army Corps (former XXXXV General Command) under Army Corps Felber in the Mediterranean theater. In February 1943 (after the crushing German defeat at the Battle of Stalingrad), the 327th Infantry Division was called upon to prepare for immediate redeployment to the Eastern Front. From March to August 1943, the division served under the XIII Army Corps of 2nd Army under Army Group Center in the Kursk sector, where it was reduced to Kampfgruppe strength. From September to November 1943, the now Kampfgruppe-strength 327th Infantry Division, along with its XIII Army Corps, was part of the 4th Panzer Army of Army Group South in the Kyiv and Zhytomyr sectors. It was now commanded by a Colonel-rank officer named Walter Lang, who was appointed to this post in August 1943.

The division was formally dissolved on 2 November 1943. The divisional staff, reconnaissance detachment, and resupply units joined the newly formed 357th Infantry Division in the General Government. The remainder of the infantry formations were reorganized from Grenadier Regiment 597 to Division Group 327. Division Group 327 was later reorganized into Grenadier Regiment 694 of the 340th Infantry Division and destroyed in the Brody Pocket.
