= 331st Division =

331st Division may refer to:

- 331st Infantry Division, Wehrmacht, Germany
- 331st Rifle Division, Soviet Union

== See also ==
- List of military divisions by number
