= 327th Division =

327th Division may refer to:

- 327th Infantry Division, Wehrmacht, Germany
- 327th Rifle Division, Soviet Union
- 327th Air Division, United States

== See also ==
- List of military divisions by number
