= Hans-Karl Freiherr von Esebeck =

German general in World War II

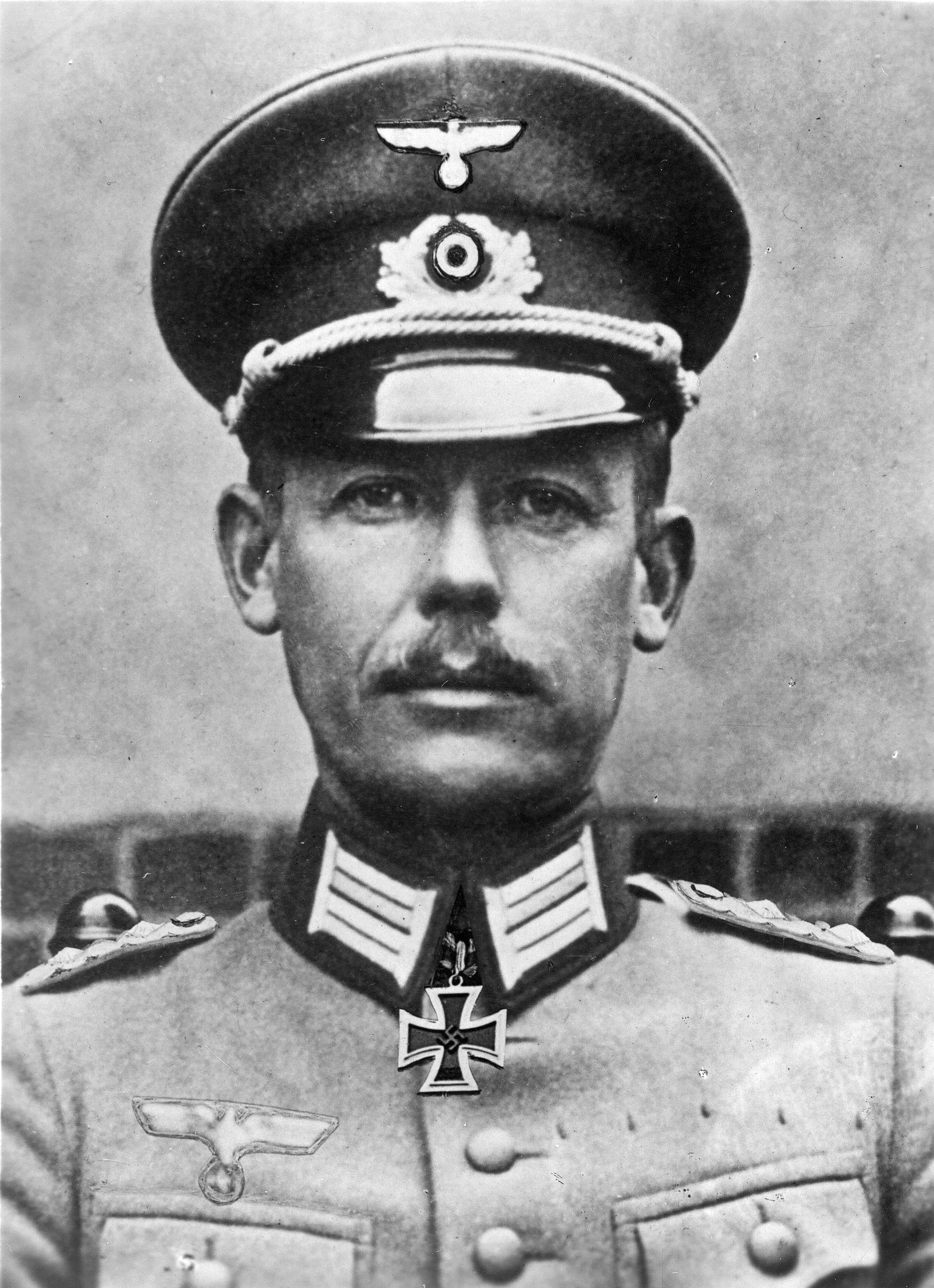
- Born: 10 July 1892; Potsdam, Province of Brandenburg, Kingdom of Prussia, German Empire
- Died: 5 January 1955 (aged 62); Dortmund-Bodelschwingh, North Rhine-Westphalia, West Germany
- Military career
- Allegiance: Kingdom of Prussia; German Empire; Weimar Republic; Nazi Germany
- Branch: Prussian Army; Imperial German Army; Freikorps; Reichsheer; German Army
- Service years: 1911–1944
- Rank: General der Panzertruppe
- Commands: 15th Panzer Division; 11th Panzer Division; 2nd Panzer-Division; XXXXVI Panzer Corps; LVII Panzer Corps; LVIII Panzer Corps
- Conflicts: World War I World War II
- Awards: Knight's Cross of the Iron Cross

Hans-Karl Asmus Werner Freiherr von Esebeck (10 July 1892 – 5 January 1955) was a German general who commanded the 15th Panzer Division in the Afrika Korps.

Esebeck had knowledge of and was sympathetic to the anti-Hitler conspiracy in the military. He was arrested on 21 July 1944, discharged from the Wehrmacht with effect from 31 December 1944 and spent the rest of the war in a military prison. Liberated at the end of the war he lived the rest of his life at Bodelschwingh Castle, died on 5 January 1955 and was buried in the Family Cemetery at Bodelschwingh Castle.

== Family ==
Hans-Karl was the son of the Master of the Horse (Oberstallmeister) of Kaiser Wilhelm II and Major General à la suite Walter Asmus Karl Friedrich Eberhard Freiherr von Esebeck (1853–1914), lord of the manor and Knight of Justice (Rechtsritter) of the Johanniter-Orden, and his first wife (∞ 1882) Elisabeth Luise Mathilde Gräfin von Blumenthal (1855–1893), daughter of lord of the manor Captain (ret.) Georg Adam Werner Graf von Blumenthal (1815–1883). After Elisabeth's death, widower Freiherr von Esebeck married on 23 October 1902 in Echzell Margarethe Dorothea von Harnier (1872–1920). Hans-Karl had four siblings.

== Promotions ==
- 25 September 1911 Fahnenjunker (Officer Candidate)
- 22 February 1912 Fahnenjunker-Unteroffizier (Officer Candidate with Corporal/NCO/Junior Sergeant rank)
- 19 June 1912 Fähnrich (Officer Cadet)
- 18 February 1913 Leutnant (2nd Lieutenant) with Patent from 22 February 1911
- 6 June 1916 Oberleutnant (1st Lieutenant)
- 5 March 1923 Rittmeister with effect from 1 March 1923
- 1 June 1933 Major
- 18 January 1936 Oberstleutnant (Lieutenant Colonel) with effect from 1 January 1936
- 31 May 1938 Oberst (Colonel) with effect from 1 June 1938
- 22 April 1941 Generalmajor (Major General) with effect from 15 April 1941 but without Rank Seniority (RDA)
  - 17 December 1941 received RDA from 1 October 1941 (23)
- 16 November 1942 Generalleutnant (Lieutenant General) with effect and RDA from 1 December 1942
- 1 February 1944 General der Panzertruppe

== Awards and decorations ==
- Iron Cross (1914), 2nd and 1st Class
  - 2nd Class on 20 September 1914
  - 1st Class on 27 January 1917
- Waldeck Cross of Merit, IV Class with Swords (WV4X) on 24 July 1915
- Austro-Hungarian Military Merit Cross, 3rd Class with the War Decoration (ÖM3K) on 2 October 1916
- Württemberg Friedrich Order, Knight's Cross 2nd Class with Swords (WF3bX) on 29 November 1916
- Finish Order of the Cross of Liberty, 2nd Class with Swords on 7 May 1918
- Commemorative Medal of the Finnish War of Independence 1918 on 15 August 1918
- Silesian Eagle, 2nd Class
- Honour Cross of the World War 1914/1918 with Swords
- Wehrmacht Long Service Award, 4th to 1st Class
- Repetition Clasp 1939 to the Iron Cross 1914, 2nd and 1st Class
  - 2nd Class on 26 September 1939
  - 1st Class on 15 May 1940
- Panzer Badge
- Italian Medal of Military Valor in Silver on 21 June 1942
- Winter Battle in the East 1941–42 Medal
- Wound Badge (1939) in Silver on 15 August 1942
- Medal for the Italian-German Campaign in Africa
- Africa Cuff Title
- Knight's Cross of the Iron Cross on 4 July 1940 as Oberst and Commander of the 6. Schützen-Brigade
- German Cross in Gold on 20 December 1942 as Major General and Commander of the 2nd Panzer Division

Military offices
Preceded by Generalleutnant Heinrich von Prittwitz und Gaffron	Commander of 15. Panzer-Division; April 13, 1941 - May 26, 1941	Succeeded by Generalleutnant Walter Neumann-Silkow
Preceded by Generalleutnant Günther Angern	Commander of 11. Panzer Division; 24 August 1941 - 20 October 1941	Succeeded by Generalleutnant Walter Scheller
Preceded by General der Panzertruppe Rudolf Veiel	Commander of 2. Panzer-Division; February 17, 1942 - June 1, 1942	Succeeded by Generalleutnant Arno von Lenski
Preceded by General der Infanterie Hans Zorn	Commander of XXXXVI Panzer Corps; November 20, 1942 - June 20, 1943	Succeeded by General der Infanterie Hans Zorn
Preceded by General der Panzertruppe Friedrich Kirchner	Commander of LVII Panzer Corps; November 30, 1943 - February 19, 1944	Succeeded by General der Panzertruppe Friedrich Kirchner
Preceded by General der Panzertruppen Leo Freiherr Geyr von Schweppenburg	Commander of LVIII Panzer Corps; December 1, 1943 - February 10, 1944	Succeeded by General der Panzertruppen Walter Krüger
