= Hanns Laengenfelder =

German General and Knight's Cross recipients (1903–1982)

- Born: 8 February 1903; Nuremberg
- Died: 18 July 1982 (aged 79); Nuremberg
- Military career
- Allegiance: Weimar Republic; Nazi Germany
- Branch: Army
- Service years: 1923–45
- Rank: Generalmajor
- Commands: 15th Infantry Division
- Conflicts: World War II
- Awards: Knight's Cross of the Iron Cross with Oak Leaves

Hanns Laengenfelder (8 February 1903 – 18 July 1982) was a German general (Generalmajor) in the Wehrmacht during World War II who commanded the 15th Infantry Division. He was a recipient of the Knight's Cross of the Iron Cross with Oak Leaves of Nazi Germany. Laengenfelder surrendered to the Soviet forces in May 1945 and was held in the Soviet Union as a war criminal until 1955.

== Awards and decorations ==
- Iron Cross (1939) 2nd Class (17 September 1939) & 1st Class (1 November 1939)
- Knight's Cross of the Iron Cross with Oak Leaves
  - Knight's Cross on 21 October 1943 as Oberstleutnant and commander of Grenadier-Regiment 106
  - Nominated for Oak Leaves in 1945

Military offices
Preceded by Oberst Ottomar Babel	Commander of 15. Infanterie-Division; October 1944 – May 1945	Succeeded by None
