= Westheer =

World War 2 German army group fighting in the western front

The Westheer (Western Army) is the name given to the German Army fighting on the Western Front from Autumn of 1940 to the end of the war. The Oberbefehlshaber West was the largest command structure for the Westheer.

== History ==
It was composed of Army Group H, which was based in the Netherlands under Generaloberst Kurt Student, Army Group B, covering northern France under Field Marshal Erwin Rommel and Army Group G, which was based in southern France under the command of Generaloberst Johannes Blaskowitz. Also included was the Panzer Group West, under the command of General der Panzertruppe Leo Geyr von Schweppenburg.

Most of Westheer's divisions were static infantry divisions, which did not have their own organic transport to move their own artillery. They were also laden with Ost battalions, which were made up of Russian POWs who had chosen to serve in the Wehrmacht. The leadership was also divided how to meet the invasion. Rommel, who commanded the expected landing areas, insisted that the panzer divisions should be near the coast, where they could quickly act without much interference. Rundstedt and von Schweppenburg suggested that they should be kept inland, to outmaneuver the enemy in battle. Thus, they were unsure on what to do in D-day. Despite that, the Westheer had 10 Heer and Waffen SS panzer and panzergrenadier divisions, besides some veteran infantry divisions of the Eastern Front which were currently refitting in France at D-day. At D-day, the Westheer had around 58 divisions organized into four armies.

It was commanded by Generalfeldmarschall Gerd von Rundstedt at the time of Operation Overlord. Hitler's refusal to release the armored reserve until 1430 hours on D-day prevented the Germans from eliminating the allied beachheads while they were lightly held. Thus, the Westheer was embroiled in a battle of attrition which it could not win. Particularly difficult was the surrounding bocage of the Norman countryside, which seriously hampered armored operations and the allied bombing, which prevented the Germans from receiving reinforcements in strength. After Operation Cobra, the Westheer's order of battle was decimated by the destruction of the Falaise pocket, which consisted primarily of Army Group B.

Although the Westheer regrouped after Falaise to fight in the Battle of Hurtgen Forest and Battle of the Bulge, it never exhibited the strength that they had in the summer of 1944. Most of its divisions at that time were understrength in personnel and equipment. The remnants of the Westheer disintegrated after the American breakthrough in the Battle of Remagen.

Most units of the Westheer surrendered in the last weeks of World War II, especially at the Ruhr Pocket.
