= Curt Gallenkamp =

German general (1890–1958)

- Born: 17 February 1890; Wesel, German Empire
- Died: 13 April 1958 (aged 68); Wiesbaden, West Germany
- Relatives: Kurt von Tippelskirch (brother in-law)
- Military career
- Allegiance: German Empire; Weimar Republic; Nazi Germany
- Branch: German Army
- Service years: 1909–1945
- Rank: General der Artillerie
- Commands: 78th Infantry Division; Higher Command XXXI; LXXX Army Corps
- Conflicts: World War I; World War II; Invasion of Poland; Battle of France; Operation Barbarossa; Battle of Białystok–Minsk; Battle of Smolensk
- Awards: Knight's Cross of the Iron Cross

Curt Gallenkamp (17 February 1890 – 13 April 1958) was a German general (General of the Artillery) in the Wehrmacht during World War II and a convicted war criminal. He was a recipient of the Knight's Cross of the Iron Cross of Nazi Germany.

Gallenkamp was born in 1890 and entered the Royal Prussian Army in 1909. He fought in World War I as a junior officer and was awarded the Iron Cross, 1st and 2nd class, the Hanseatic Cross of Hamburg and the Wound Badge, in black. After the war, he remained in the peacetime Reichswehr as a career officer. He fought in World War II as a division and corps commander. Gallenkamp surrendered to the British troops in May 1945. He was tried for war crimes for the deaths of British paratroops/commandos and an American pilot. He was sentenced to be hanged in 1947, but had his sentence commuted to life imprisonment and was released in 1952.

== Awards ==
- Iron Cross (1914)
  - 2nd Class
  - 1st Class
- Hanseatic Cross of Hamburg
- Wound Badge in black
- Honour Cross of the World War 1914/1918
- Iron Cross (1939)
  - 2nd Class
  - 1st Class
- Knight's Cross of the Iron Cross on 19 November 1941 as Generalleutnant and commander of 78. Infanterie-Division

== Notes ==
Military offices
| Preceded by General der Artillerie Fritz Brand | Commander of 78. Infanterie-Division; 1 October 1939 – 29 September 1941 | Succeeded by Generalleutnant Emil Markgraf |
| Preceded by General der Artillerie Leonhard Kaupisch | Commander of Höheres Kommando z.b.V. XXXI; 10 April 1940 - 27 May 1942 | Succeeded by None |
| Preceded by None | Commander of LXXX. Armeekorps; 27 May 1942 – 7 August 1944 | Succeeded by General der Infanterie Dr. Franz Beyer |
