= 5th Division (Reichswehr) =

- 5. Division
- Active: 1921–1934
- Disbanded: October 1934
- Country: Weimar Republic
- Branch: Reichsheer
- Type: Infantry
- Size: Division
- Part of: Gruppenkommando 2
- Garrison/HQ: Wehrkreis V: Stuttgart

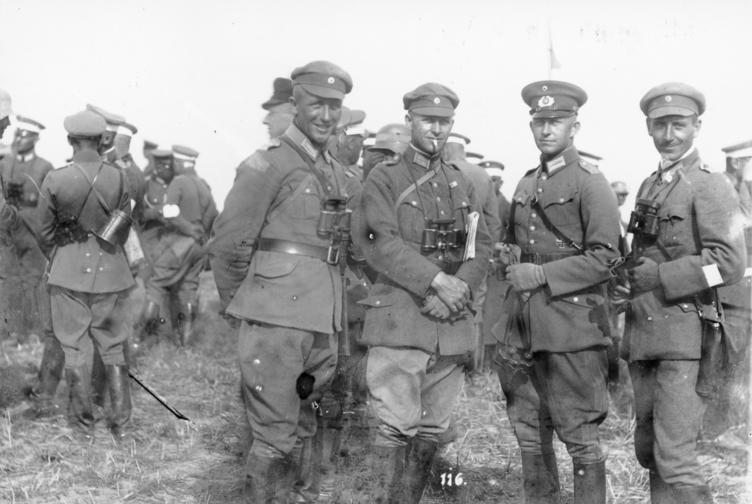
Southern Germany, maneuvers of the 5th and 7th divisions in Bavaria, Württemberg and Baden in 1926. Second from the right was Captain Alfred Jodl, later a general in the Führer's headquarters. To his left (with a cigarette) is his brother Ferdinand Jodl. People pictured: Jodl, Alfred: Colonel General, Knight's Cross (RK), Army, Nuremberg Trial, executed 1946, Germany (GND 118557602) Jodl, Ferdinand: Lieutenant General, Knight's Cross (RK), Army

The 5th Division was a unit of the German Reichswehr from 1921 to 1934.

== Creation ==
In the Order of 31 July 1920 for the Reduction of the Army (to comply with the upper limits on the size of the military contained in the Treaty of Versailles), it was determined that in every Wehrkreis (military district) a division would be established by 1 October 1920. The 5th Division was formed out of the Reichswehr's 11 and 13th Brigades, both of the former Übergangsheer (Transition Army).

It consisted of 3 infantry regiments: the 13th (Württemberger) Infantry Regiment, the 14th (Baden) Infantry Regiment, and the 15th Infantry Regiment. It also included an artillery regiment, an engineering battalion, a signals battalion, a transportation battalion, and a medical battalion. It was subordinated to Gruppenkommando 2.

The commander of Wehrkreis V was simultaneously the commander of the 5th Division. For the leadership of the troops, an Infanterieführer and an Artillerieführer were appointed, both subordinated to the commander of the division.

In the course of the expansion of the army in 1934, the divisional staff was transferred and renamed to the Generalkommando of the V Army Corps.

== Divisional commanders ==
- General der Infanterie Walther Reinhardt (1 October 1920 - 1 January 1925)
- General der Infanterie Ernst Hasse (1 January 1925 - 1 February 1927)
- General der Infanterie Hermann Reinicke (1 February 1927 - 30 September 1929)
- General der Infanterie Hans Freiherr Seutter von Lötzen (1 October 1929 - 1 December 1931)
- Generalleutnant Curt Liebmann (1 December 1931 - 1 August 1934)

=== Infantrieführers ===
- Generalmajor Hermann Geyer (1 October 1931 - 30 September 1932)

=== Artillerieführers ===
- Oberst Wilhelm Ritter von Leeb (1 March 1928 - 31 January 1929)
- Generalmajor Leonhard Kaupisch (1 February 1930 - 30 September 1932)

== Garrisons ==
The divisional headquarters was in Stuttgart. The subordinate units were located in Württemberg and Hesse.
