= Higher Command XXXI =

Special Corps in the Wehrmacht German Army

The Höheres Kommando z.b.V. XXXI (en : Higher Command for Special Duties XXXI) was a special Corps in the German Army during World War II.

== History ==
The Corps was formed on 15 October 1939 in Deutsch-Krone from the Border Protection Unit "Grenzschutz-Abschnitts-Kommando 1".
In March 1940, the Higher Command was moved to Northern Germany, to take part in the Invasion of Denmark ("Weser Übung Süd"). The task was completed by 10 April 1940. From 12 April to 31 May 1940, the staff also served as command of the German troops in Denmark.

At the beginning of the Battle of France, the Higher Command XXXI remained in Denmark. In June 1940, the Higher Command was transferred from Denmark to Luxembourg and took part in the closing stages of the Western Campaign. After the breakthrough through the Maginot Line, the Higher Command advanced towards Metz. On 18 June 1940, the Corps' 162nd ID attacked Landres and 183rd ID the area of Audun-le-Roman-Arrancy. On 20 June 20, the 183rd ID and 2/3 of the 161st ID attacked the Maginot line between Diedenhofen and the area 15 km east from Longuyon from the south.

After the end of the Western campaign, the Higher Command remained in France. It was moved to the Poitiers area, as an occupation force.
On 27 May 1942 the Higher Command was renamed LXXX Armeekorps.

== Commanders ==
- General der Artillerie Leonhard Kaupisch (7 November 1939 – 9 April 1942)
- General der Artillerie Curt Gallenkamp (10 April 1942 - 27 May 1942).

== See also ==
- List of German corps in World War II
