= Heinz Furbach =

- Born: 27 September 1895
- Died: 23 October 1968 (aged 73)
- Military career
- Allegiance: German Empire; Weimar Republic; Nazi Germany
- Branch: Army
- Service years: 1914–1945
- Rank: Generalmajor
- Commands: 331st Infantry Division
- Conflicts: World War I World War II: Eastern Front
- Awards: Knight's Cross of the Iron Cross

Heinz Furbach (27 September 1895 – 23 October 1968) was a German general n the Wehrmacht of Nazi Germany during World War II. He was also a recipient of the Knight's Cross of the Iron Cross.

== Awards and decorations ==
- Iron Cross (1914) 2nd Class (10 November 1914) & 1st Class (26 September 1916)
- Wound Badge (1914) in White (5 May 1918)
- Knight's Cross of the House Order of Hohenzollern with Swords (26 April 1918)
- Honour Cross of the World War 1914/1918 (30 December 1934)
- Wehrmacht Long Service Award 2nd Class (2 October 1936)
- Clasp to the Iron Cross (1939) 2nd Class (20 May 1940) & 1st Class (27 May 1940)
- Knight's Cross of the Iron Cross on 4 October 1942 as Oberst and commander of Infanterie-Regiment 58

Military offices
Preceded by Generalleutnant Karl Rhein	Commander of 331. Infanterie-Division; 1 January 1944 – 25 April 1944	Succeeded by Generalleutnant Karl Rhein
