= Walter Krüger (Wehrmacht general) =

German tank general (1892–1973)

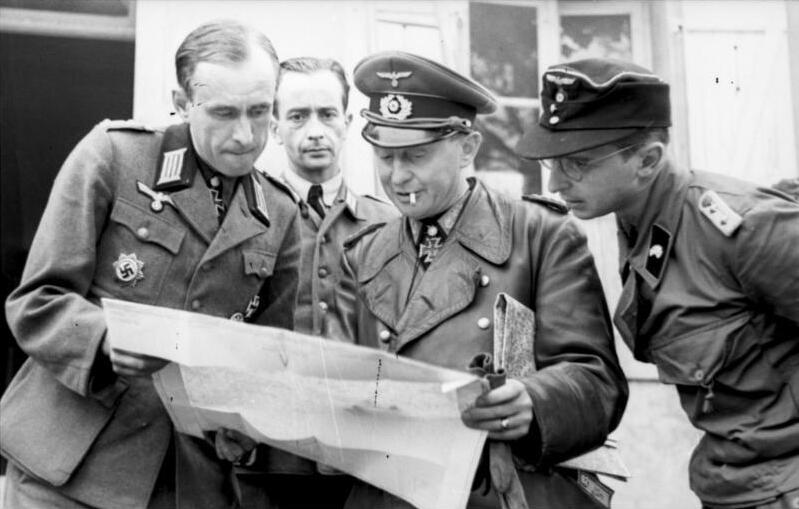
- Krüger (center) in 1944
- Born: 23 March 1892; Zeitz, Kreis Merseburg, Province of Saxony, Kingdom of Prussia, German Empire
- Died: 11 July 1973 (aged 81); Baden-Baden, Baden-Württemberg, West Germany
- Military career
- Allegiance: German Empire; Weimar Republic; Nazi Germany
- Branch: Imperial German Army; Prussian Army; Reichswehr; German Army
- Service years: 1910–1945
- Rank: General der Panzertruppe
- Commands: 1st Panzer Division; LVIII Panzer Corps
- Conflicts: World War I; World War II; Battle of France; Battle of Sedan (1940); Operation Barbarossa; Siege of Leningrad; Battle of Moscow; Battles of Rzhev; Battle of Kiev (1943); Zhitomir–Berdichev Offensive; Operation Overlord; Battle of the Bulge; Siege of Bastogne; Siegfried Line Campaign
- Awards: Knight's Cross of the Iron Cross with Oak Leaves

Walter Karl Willy Krüger (23 March 1892 – 11 July 1973) was a German general during World War II who commanded the LVIII Panzer Corps. He was a recipient of the Knight's Cross of the Iron Cross of Nazi Germany.

== Awards and decorations ==
- Iron Cross (1914)
  - 2nd Class (9 October 1914)
  - 1st Class (29 July 1916)
- Saxon Albert Order, Knights Cross 2nd Class with Swords (SA3bX) on 23 March 1915
- Civil Order of Saxony, Knights Cross 2nd Class with Swords (SV3bX) on 15 November 1915
- Knight's Cross of the Military Order of St. Henry (SH3) on 29 April 1918
- Honour Cross of the World War 1914/1918 with Swords
- German Olympic Decoration, 2nd Class
- Wehrmacht Long Service Award, 4th to 1st Class for 25 years
- Repetition Clasp 1939 to the Iron Cross 1914, 2nd and 1st Class
  - 2nd Class (12 May 1940)
  - 1st Class (13 May 1940)
- Panzer Badge in Bronze 15 September 1941
- Eastern Front Medal on 1 August 1942
- German Cross in Gold on 27 August 1942 as Generalmajor and commander of 1. Panzer-Division
- Knight's Cross of the Iron Cross with Oak Leaves
  - Knight's Cross on 16 July 1941 as Generalmajor and commander of 1. Schützen-Brigade
  - 373rd Oak Leaves on 24 January 1944 as Generalleutnant and commander of 1. Panzer-Division
- Mentioned in the Wehrmachtbericht (14 December 1943)

=== Wehrmachtbericht reference ===
Date	Original German Wehrmachtbericht wording	Direct English translation
14 December 1943	Bei diesen Kämpfen haben sich die 1. thüringische Panzerdivision unter Generalleutnant Krüger und die brandenburgische 68. Infanteriedivision unter Oberst Scheuerpflug besonders bewährt.	In these battles, the 1st Thuringian Armored Division under Lieutenant General Krüger, and the 68th Brandenburg Infantry Division under Colonel Scheuerpflug have particularly proven themselves.

Military offices
Preceded by Generalleutnant Friedrich Kirchner	Commander of 1st Panzer Division; 17 July 1941 – 31 December 1943	Succeeded by Generalmajor Richard Koll
Preceded by General der Panzertruppe Hans-Karl Freiherr von Esebeck	Commander of LVIII. Panzerkorps; 10 February 1944 – 25 March 1945	Succeeded by Generalleutnant Walter Botsch
