= Hans Zorn =

German general

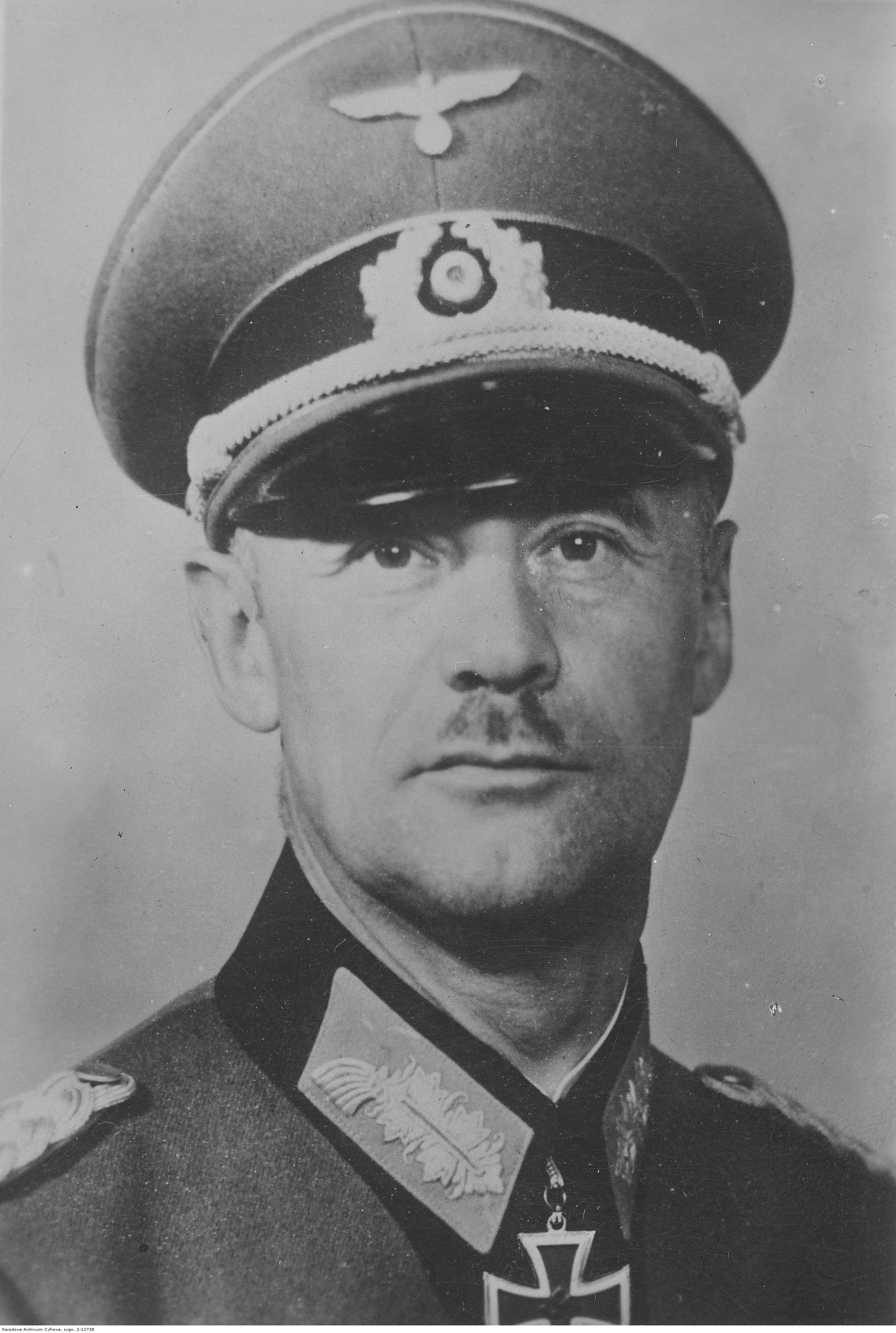
- Born: 27 October 1891; Munich, Bavaria, German Empire
- Died: 2 August 1943 (aged 51); Krassnaya-Roschtocha, Kromy, Oryol Oblast, RSFSR, USSR
- Relatives: Eduard Zorn (brother)
- Military career
- Allegiance: German Empire; Weimar Republic; Nazi Germany
- Branch: Army
- Rank: General of the Infantry
- Commands: 20th Infantry Division; XXXX Army Corps; XXXXVI Panzer Corps
- Conflicts: World War II: Soviet Operation Kutuzov †
- Awards: Knight's Cross of the Iron Cross with Oak Leaves

Hans Zorn (27 October 1891 – 2 August 1943) was a German general in the Wehrmacht during World War II. He was a recipient of the Knight's Cross of the Iron Cross with Oak Leaves of Nazi Germany. Zorn was killed on 2 August 1943 by Soviet airstrike during Operation Kutuzov. He was posthumously awarded the Oak leaves to his Knight's Cross on 3 September 1943.

== Awards and decorations ==
- Iron Cross (1914) 2nd Class (23 October 1914) & 1st Class (29 January 1916)
- Clasp to the Iron Cross (1939) 2nd Class (14 May 1940) & 1st Class (26 May 1940)
- German Cross in Gold on 14 June 1942 as General der Infanterie in the XXXXVI. Armeekorps (motorized)
- Knight's Cross of the Iron Cross with Oak Leaves
  - Knight's Cross on 27 July 1941 as Generalmajor and commander of 20. Infanterie-Division
  - 291st Oak Leaves on 3 September 1943 as General der Infanterie and commander of XXXXVI. Panzerkorps

Military offices
Preceded by Generalleutnant Mauritz von Wiktorin	Commander of 20. Infanterie-Division; November 1940 – 12 January 1942	Succeeded by Generalleutnant Erich Jaschke
Preceded by General der Kavallerie Georg Stumme	Commander of XXXX. Armeekorps (mot.); 15 January 1942 – 16 February 1942	Succeeded by General der Kavallerie Georg Stumme
Preceded by Generaloberst Heinrich von Vietinghoff	Commander of XXXXVI. Armeekorps; 11 June 1942 – 14 June 1942	Succeeded by Renamed XXXXVI. Panzerkorps
Preceded by Previously XXXXVI. Panzerkorps	Commander of XXXXVI. Panzerkorps; 14 June 1942 – 21 November 1942	Succeeded by General der Panzertruppe Hans-Karl Freiherr von Esebeck
Preceded by General der Panzertruppe Hans-Karl Freiherr von Esebeck	Commander of XXXXVI. Panzerkorps; January 1943 – 2 August 1943	Succeeded by General der Infanterie Hans Gollnick
