= LXVI Army Corps =

German army Corps during WW II

The LXVI Army Corps (German: LXVI. Armeekorps), initially known as the LXVI Reserve Corps (German: LXVI. Reservekorps), was an army corps of the German Wehrmacht during World War II. The corps was formed in September 1942.

== History ==
The LXVI Reserve Corps was formed on 21 September 1942 in Wehrkreis IX. The initial purpose of the corps staff was to oversee and lead the reserve divisions of Oberbefehlshaber West (Army Group D). Its headquarters were initially deployed in the Clermont-Ferrand area. The initial corps commander during the formation of the LXVI Reserve Corps was Erich Marcks, but Marcks was soon succeeded by Baptist Knieß on 12 November 1942.

The LXVI Reserve Corps oversaw the formation of the LXXVI Panzer Corps on 25 February 1943. On 7 July 1943, Knieß was succeeded as the corps commander by Wilhelm Wetzel. Wetzel was in turn succeeded by Walther Lucht on 20 December 1943.

Having received a new military postal number in June 1943, the LXVI Reserve Corps was renamed LXVI Army Corps on 5 August 1944. Subsequently, the corps was used in combat on the Western Front, including in the Vosges, Eifel and Ardennes region. It was subsequently subordinate, in order, to the 19th Army in September 1944, the 7th Army between October and December 1944, the 6th Panzer Army in January 1945, the 5th Panzer Army between February and March 1945, and the 11th Army in April 1945.

== Structure ==
Organizational structure of the LXVI (66th) Reserve Corps and the LXVI (66th) Army Corps of the German Wehrmacht, 1942 – 1945
Year	Date	Commander	Subordinate Divisions	Army	Army Group	Operational area
1942	October	Erich Marcks	Various	Army Group D (v. Rundstedt)		Clermont-Ferrand
1942	November	Baptist Knieß	Various	Army Group D (v. Rundstedt)		Clermont-Ferrand
1942	December	Baptist Knieß	Various	Army Group D (v. Rundstedt)		Clermont-Ferrand
1943	January	Baptist Knieß	Various	Army Group D (v. Rundstedt)		Clermont-Ferrand
1943	February	Baptist Knieß	Various	Army Group D (v. Rundstedt)		Clermont-Ferrand
1943	March	Baptist Knieß	Various	Army Group D (v. Rundstedt)		Clermont-Ferrand
1943	April	Baptist Knieß	Various	Army Group D (v. Rundstedt)		Clermont-Ferrand
1943	May	Otto Roettig	Various	Army Group D (v. Rundstedt)		Clermont-Ferrand
1943	June	Wilhelm Wetzel	Various	Army Group D (v. Rundstedt)		Clermont-Ferrand
1943	July	Wilhelm Wetzel	Various	Army Group D (v. Rundstedt)		Clermont-Ferrand
1943	August	Wilhelm Wetzel	Various	Army Group D (v. Rundstedt)		Clermont-Ferrand
1943	September	Wilhelm Wetzel	Various	Army Group D (v. Rundstedt)		Clermont-Ferrand
1943	October	Wilhelm Wetzel	Various	Army Group D (v. Rundstedt)		Clermont-Ferrand
1943	November	Wilhelm Wetzel	Various	Army Group D (v. Rundstedt)		Clermont-Ferrand
1943	December	Wilhelm Wetzel	Various	Army Group D (v. Rundstedt)		Clermont-Ferrand
1944	January	Walther Lucht	Various	Army Group D (v. Rundstedt)		Clermont-Ferrand
1944	February	Walther Lucht	Various	Army Group D (v. Rundstedt)		Clermont-Ferrand
1944	March	Walther Lucht	Various	Army Group D (v. Rundstedt)		Clermont-Ferrand
1944	April	Walther Lucht	Various	Army Group D (v. Rundstedt)		Clermont-Ferrand
1944	May	Walther Lucht	Various	Army Group G (Blaskowitz)		Clermont-Ferrand
1944	June	Walther Lucht	Various	Army Group G (Blaskowitz)		Clermont-Ferrand
1944	July	Walther Lucht	Various	Army Group G (Blaskowitz)		Clermont-Ferrand
1944	August	Walther Lucht	Various	Army Group D (v. Kluge)		Clermont-Ferrand
1944	16 September	Walther Lucht	15th Infantry, 16th Infantry	19th Army	Army Group G (Blaskowitz)	Vosges
1944	13 October	Walther Lucht	1st SS, 2nd SS, 12th SS, 2nd Panzer, 172nd Infantry	7th Army	Army Group B (Model)	Eifel
1944	5 November	Walther Lucht	2nd Panzer, 18th Infantry, 91st Infantry	7th Army	Army Group B (Model)	Eifel
1944	26 November	Walther Lucht	18th Infantry, 26th Infantry	7th Army	Army Group B (Model)	Eifel
1944	31 December	Walther Lucht	18th Infantry, 62nd Infantry	6th Panzer Army	Army Group B (Model)	Ardennes
1945	19 February	Walther Lucht	5th Parachute, 18th Infantry, 246th Volksgrenadier	5th Panzer Army	Army Group B (Model)	Eifel, Rur
1945	1 March	Walther Lucht	5th Parachute	5th Panzer Army	Army Group B (Model)	Eifel, Rur
1945	April	Hermann Flörke	9th Panzer, 116th Panzer, 277th Infantry, Panzer Division Westfalen	11th Army	Army Group D (Kesselring)	Weser

== Noteworthy individuals ==
- Erich Marcks, corps commander of LXVI Reserve Corps between 21 September 1942 and 12 November 1942.
- Baptist Knieß, corps commander of LXVI Reserve Corps between 12 November 1942 and 10 May 1943 and between June 1943 and 7 July 1943.
- Otto Roettig, corps commander of LXVI Reserve Corps between 21 May 1943 and June 1943.
- Wilhelm Wetzel, corps commander of LXVI Reserve Corps between 7 July 1943 and 20 December 1943.
- Walther Lucht, corps commander of LXVI Reserve Corps between 20 December 1943 and 5 August 1944, corps commander of the renamed LXVI Army Corps between 5 August 1944 and 3 April 1945.
- Hermann Flörke, corps commander of LXVI Army Corps between 3 April 1945 and the end of the war.
