= Friedrich Kirchner =

German general (1885–1960)

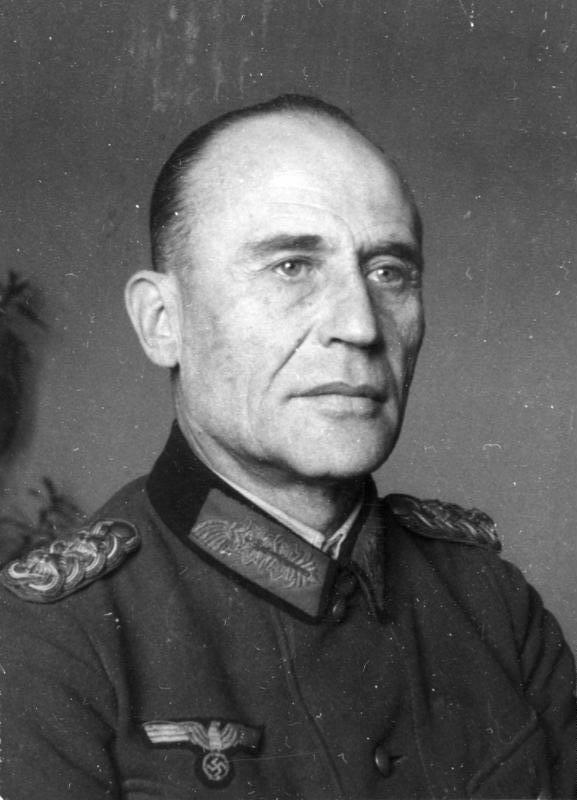
- Born: 26 March 1885; Zöbigker, Leipzig, Kingdom of Saxony, German Empire
- Died: 6 April 1960 (aged 75); Fulda, Hesse, West Germany
- Military career
- Allegiance: German Empire; Weimar Republic; Nazi Germany
- Branch: Nazi Germany
- Service years: 1899–1945
- Rank: General der Panzertruppe
- Commands: 1st Panzer Division; LVII Panzer Corps
- Conflicts: World War I; World War II; Invasion of Poland; Battle of France
- Awards: Knight's Cross of the Iron Cross with Oak Leaves and Swords

Friedrich Kirchner (26 March 1885 – 6 April 1960) was a German general during World War II who commanded 1st Panzer Division and the LVII Panzer Corps. He was a recipient of the Knight's Cross of the Iron Cross with Oak Leaves and Swords.

== Career ==
Friedrich Kirchner joined the Royal Saxon Army in 1899 and became an officer in 1907. During World War I he served with the 23d Division. After World War I he was retained in the Reichsheer. Kirchner was promoted to major in 1928 and from 1929 he served in the staff of a cavalry division. Since 1 October 1933, he commanded a battalion in the 11th Cavalry Regiment in Neustadt (now Prudnik, Poland). Kirchner was promoted to Oberst in 1934 and appointed to command an infantry regiment in the 1st Panzer Division on 15 October 1935 and commanding officer of an infantry brigade on 10 November 1938. He was promoted to Generalmajor in March 1938.

He participated in the invasion of Poland as a brigade commander; he was appointed command of the 1st Panzer Division in November 1939. On 1 April 1940 he was promoted to Generalleutnant. Kirchner led the division in the Battle of France and was awarded the Knight’s Cross of the Iron Cross on 20 May 1940. He then took command of the LVII Armeekorps on 15 November 1941 and remained in command of the unit (re-designated LVII Panzer Corps) until the end of World War II.

He was taken prisoner by US forces in May 1945 and released in 1947.

== Awards ==
- Iron Cross (1914) 2nd Class (1 October 1914) & 1st Class (26 September 1917)
- Clasp to the Iron Cross (1939) 2nd Class (22 September 1939) &1st Class (4 October 1939)
- German Cross in Gold on 22 April 1942 as Generalleutnant and commander of the 1. Panzer-Division
- Knight's Cross of the Iron Cross with Oak Leaves and Swords
  - Knight's Cross on 20 May 1940 as Generalleutnant and commander of the 1. Panzer-Division
  - Oak Leaves on 12 February 1944 as General der Panzertruppe and commanding general of the LVII. Panzer-Korps
  - Swords on 26 January 1945 as General der Panzertruppe and commanding general of the LVII. Panzer-Korps

Military offices
Preceded by Generalleutnant Rudolf Schmidt	Commander of 1. Panzer-Division; 2 November 1939 – 17 July 1941	Succeeded by Generalmajor Walter Krüger
Preceded by LVII. Armeekorps	Commander of LVII Panzer Corps; 21 June 1942 – 30 November 1943	Succeeded by General der Panzertruppe Hans-Karl Freiherr von Esebeck
Preceded by General der Panzertruppe Hans-Karl Freiherr von Esebeck	Commander of LVII Panzer Corps; 19 February 1944 – 25 May 1944	Succeeded by General der Infanterie Dr. Franz Beyer
Preceded by General der Infanterie Dr. Franz Beyer	Commander of LVII Panzer Corps; 2 June 1944 – 8 May 1945	Succeeded by none
