= Baptist Knieß =

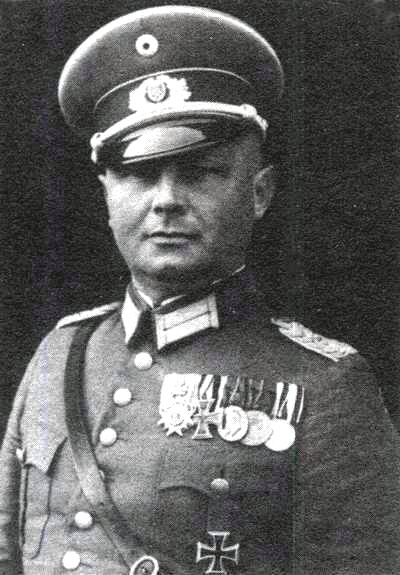
- Born: 17 April 1885
- Died: 10 November 1956 (aged 71)
- Military career
- Allegiance: German Empire; Weimar Republic; Nazi Germany
- Branch: German Army
- Service years: 1914–1945
- Rank: General der Infanterie
- Commands: 215th Infantry Division; LXVI Army Corps; LXXXV Army Corps
- Conflicts: World War I; World War II; Battle of France; Operation Barbarossa; Battle of Kiev (1941); Battle of Moscow; Lower Dnieper Offensive

Baptist Knieß (17 April 1885 – 10 November 1956) was a German general during World War II who held several commands at division and corps level.

== Sources ==
- "Baptist Knieß on www.lexikon-der-wehrmacht.de" (in German).
- "Baptist Knieß on TracesOfWar.com".
