= Army Group Centre =

Name of two German Army Groups in the Eastern Front of World War II

- German: Heeresgruppe Mitte
- Active: 22 June 1941 – 25 January 1945; 25 January 1945 – 11 May 1945
- Country: Nazi Germany
- Branch: Heer ( Wehrmacht)

Commanders
- Notable commanders: Fedor von Bock

Army Group Centre (German: Heeresgruppe Mitte) was the name of two distinct strategic German Army Groups that fought on the Eastern Front in World War II. The first Army Group Centre was created during the planning of Operation Barbarossa, Germany's invasion of the Soviet Union, as one of the three German Army formations assigned to the invasion.

After Army Group North was trapped in the Courland Pocket in mid-1944, it was renamed Army Group Courland and the first Army Group Centre was renamed "Army Group North". The second iteration of Army Group Centre was formed by the redesignation of Army Group A as the replacement for the first Army Group Centre.

== Formation and command ==
The army group was officially created by Adolf Hitler when he issued Führer Directive 21 on 18 December 1940, ordering German forces to prepare for an attack on Soviet Russia in 1941. The first commanding officer of Army Group Centre was Field Marshal Fedor von Bock, who would lead it until he was relieved on 18 December 1941 after the failure of the Battle of Moscow and was replaced by Field Marshal Günther von Kluge.

Günther von Kluge would remain the army group's commander until he was injured in October 1943 and replaced by Field Marshal Ernst Busch, who would then be replaced by Field Marshal Walter Model in June 1944. When Model was transferred to the Western Front in August 1944, he was replaced by Ferdinand Schörner, who would command the army group until his desertion in May 1945 after Germany surrendered to the Allies.

=== Order of battle at formation ===
Order of battle of Army Group Centre, 22 June 1941
Army-level formations	Primary subordinates	Secondary subordinates
Army group reserves: 537th Signals Regiment
Panzer Group 2 (Guderian)	XXIV Panzer Corps (Geyr von Schweppenburg)	1st Cavalry Division, 3rd Panzer Division, 4th Panzer Division, 10th Mot. Infantry Division, 267th Infantry Division
Panzer Group 2 (Guderian)	XLVI Panzer Corps (von Vietinghoff)	2nd SS Panzer Division Das Reich
Panzer Group 2 (Guderian)	XLVII Panzer Corps (Lemelsen)	17th Panzer Division, 18th Panzer Division, 29th Infantry Division, 167th Infantry Division
Panzer Group 2 (Guderian)	XII Army Corps (Schroth)	31st Infantry Division, 34th Infantry Division, 45th Infantry Division, 255th Infantry Division
Panzer Group 3 (Hoth)	V Army Corps (Ruoff)	5th ID, 35th ID
Panzer Group 3 (Hoth)	VI Army Corps (Förster)	6th ID, 26th ID
Panzer Group 3 (Hoth)	XXXIX Panzer Corps (Schmidt)	7th Pz, 20th Pz, 14th Mot.Div., 20th Mot.Div.
Panzer Group 3 (Hoth)	LVII Panzer Corps (Kuntzen)	12th Pz, 19th Pz, 18th Mot.Div.
4th Army (von Kluge)	VII Army Corps (Fahrmbacher)	7th ID, 23rd ID, 258th ID, 268th ID, 221st Sec.Div.
4th Army (von Kluge)	IX Army Corps (Geyer)	137th ID, 263rd ID, 292nd ID
4th Army (von Kluge)	XIII Army Corps (Felber)	17th ID, 78th ID
4th Army (von Kluge)	XLIII Army Corps (Heinrici)	131st ID, 134th ID, 252nd ID, 286th Sec.Div.
9th Army (Strauss)	VIII Army Corps (Heitz)	8th ID, 28th ID, 161st ID
9th Army (Strauss)	XX Army Corps (Materna)	162nd ID, 256th ID
9th Army (Strauss)	XLII Army Corps (Kuntze)	87th ID, 102nd ID, 129th ID, 403rd Sec

== Campaign and operational history ==
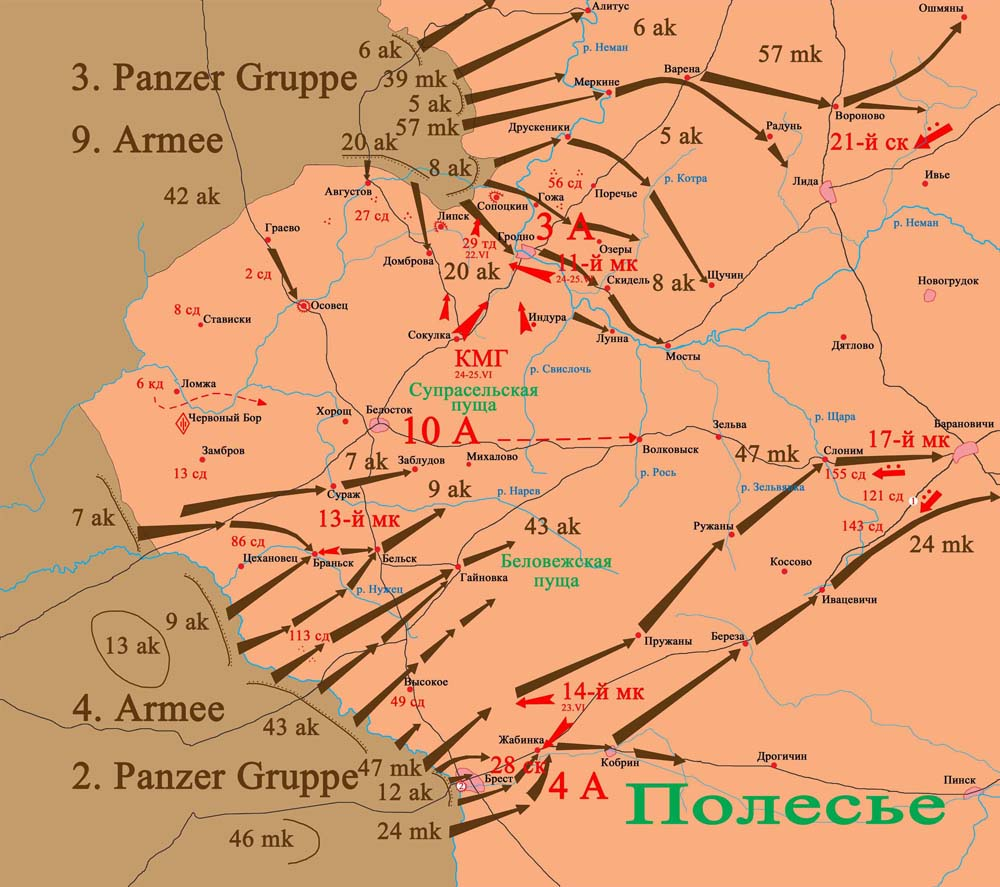
Assault of Army Group Centre on Brest, Baranovichi, Grodno and Białystok, June 1941

=== Operation Barbarossa ===
On 22 June 1941, Nazi Germany and its Axis allies launched their offensive into the Soviet Union. Their armies, totalling under four million men, were to advance in three directions eastward: towards Leningrad, Moscow, and Ukraine respectively. Army Group Centre's initial strategic goal was for blitzkrieg movement short of Moscow, stop, halve its forces, and assist in pincer movements into Leningrad and Ukraine, dependent upon the orders given, based on successes from Army Groups North and South. Defeating the Soviet armies in Byelorussia and occupying Smolensk were expected, given Nazi Germany's earlier successes, most notably in France, Poland, Greece, Yugoslavia, The Low Countries, Norway, and Denmark.

July 1941 order of battle
3rd Panzer Group, 9th Army, 4th Army, 2nd Panzer Group, z. Vfg. 2nd Army

August 1941 order of battle
3rd Panzer Group, 9th Army, 2nd Army, Panzer Group Guderian (2nd Panzer Group, with additional units)

September 1941 order of battle
3rd Panzer Group, 9th Army, 4th Army, 2nd Panzer Group, 2nd Army

Bitter fighting in the Battle of Smolensk and the Lötzen decision delayed the German advance for two months. The advance of Army Group Centre was further delayed as Hitler ordered a postponement of the offensive against Moscow in order to conquer Ukraine first.

=== Attack on Moscow ===
October 1941 detailed order of battle

- 2nd Army (von Weichs)

- LIII Army Corps (Weisenberger)

56th ID, 31st ID, 167th ID

- LXIII Army Corps (Heinrici)

52nd ID, 131st ID

- XIII Army Corps (Felber)

260th ID, 17th ID Reserve: 112th ID

- 2nd Panzer Army (Guderian)

- XXXIV Army Corps (Metz)

45th ID, 134th ID

- XXXV Army Corps (Kempfe)

95th ID, 296th ID, 262nd ID, 293rd ID

- XLVIII Panzer Corps (Kempff)

9th Pz, 16th Mot.Div., 25th Mot.Div.

- XXIV Panzer Corps (Geyr von Schweppenburg)

3rd Pz, 4th Pz, 10th Mot.Div.

- XLVII Panzer Corps (Lemelsen)

17th Pz, 18th Pz, 29th Mot.Div.

- 4th Army (von Kluge)

- VII Army Corps (Fahrmbacher)

197th ID, 7th ID, 23rd ID, 267th ID

- XX Army Corps (Materna)

268th ID, 15th, 78th ID

- IX Army Corps (Geyer)

137th ID, 263rd ID, 183rd ID, 292nd ID

- Panzer Group 4 (Hoepner), Subordinated to 4th Army

- XII Army Corps (Schroth)

34th ID, 98th ID

- XL Army Corps (Stumme)

10th Pz, 2nd Pz, 258th ID

- XLVI Panzer Corps (von Vietinghoff)
5th Bz, 11th Pz, 251nd ID
- LVII Panzer Corps (Kuntzen)

20th Pz, SS "Das Reich" Mot.Div., 3rd Mot.Div. [352]

- 9th Army (Strauss)

- XXVII Army Corps (Wager)

255th ID, 162nd ID, 86th ID

- V Army Corps (Ruoff)

5th ID, 35th ID, 106th ID, 129th ID

- VIII Army Corps (Heitz)

8th ID, 28th ID, 87th ID

- XXIII Army Corps (Schubert)

251st ID, 102nd ID, 256th ID, 206th ID
161st ID (Reserve)

- Panzer Group 3 (Hoth), Subordinated to 9th Army

- LVI Panzer Corps (Schaal)

6th Pz, 7th Pz, 14th Mot.Div.

- XLI Panzer Corps (Reinhardt)

1st Pz, 36th Mot.Div.

- VI Army Corps (Forster)

110th ID, 26th ID, 6th ID

November 1941 order of battle
2nd Panzer Army, 3rd Panzer Group, 2nd Army, 4th Army, 9th Army

The commander in chief as of 19 December 1941 was Günther von Kluge (for a short time before Christmas of 1941, this role was fulfilled by Günther Blumentritt).

=== Rzhev operations ===
1942 opened for Army Group Centre with continuing attacks from Soviet forces around Rzhev. The German Ninth Army was able to repel these attacks and stabilise its front, despite continuing large-scale partisan activity in its rear areas. Meanwhile, the German strategic focus on the Eastern Front shifted to southwestern Russia, with the launching of Operation Blue in June. This operation, aimed at the oilfields in the southwestern Caucasus, involved Army Group South alone, with the other German army groups giving up troops and equipment for the offensive.

Despite the focus on the south, Army Group Centre continued to see fierce fighting throughout the year. While the Soviet attacks in early 1942 had not driven the Germans back, they had resulted in several Red Army units being trapped behind German lines. Eliminating the pockets took until July, the same month in which the Soviets made another attempt to break through the army group's front; the attempt failed, but the front line was pushed back closer to Rzhev. The largest Soviet operation in the army group's sector that year, Operation Mars, took place in November. It was launched concurrently with Operation Uranus, the counteroffensive against the German assault on Stalingrad. The operation was repulsed with very heavy Soviet losses, although it did have the effect of pinning down German units that could have been sent to the fighting around Stalingrad.

January 1942 order of battle
2nd Panzer Army, 3rd Panzer Army, 4th Panzer Army, 2nd Army, 4th Army, 9th Army

February 1942 order of battle
2nd Panzer Army, 3rd Panzer Army, 4th Panzer Army, 4th Army, 9th Army

May 1942 order of battle
2nd Panzer Army, 3rd Panzer Army, 4th Army, 9th Army

=== Campaign in Russia and Byelorussia ===
Following the disaster of Stalingrad and poor results of the Voronezh defensive operations, the army high command expected another attack on Army Group Centre in early 1943. However, Hitler had decided to strike first. Before this strike could be launched, Operation Büffel was launched to forestall any possible Soviet spring offensives, by evacuating the Rzhev Salient to shorten the frontline.

January 1943 order of battle
2nd Panzer Army, 3rd Panzer Army, 4th Army, 9th Army, LIX Army Corps

The commander in chief as of 12 October 1943 was Ernst Busch.

February 1943 order of battle
2nd Panzer Army, 3rd Panzer Army, 4th Army, 9th Army

==== Anti-partisan campaign in Byelorussia ====
The following major anti-partisan operations were conducted in the rear of Army Group Centre, alongside many smaller operations:

- Operation Bamberg: conducted 26 March – 6 April 1942 by the 707th Infantry Division supported by a Slovak regiment, south of Bobruisk. At least 5,000 people (including many civilians) were killed and agricultural produce was confiscated.
- Operation Fruhlingsfest: conducted 17 April – 12 May 1944 in the area of Polotsk by units of Gruppe von Gottberg. Around 7,000 deaths were recorded at the hands of German forces.
- Operation Kormoran: conducted 25 May – 17 June 1944 between Minsk and Borisov by German security units in the rear of Third Panzer Army. Around 7,500 deaths recorded.

Increasing coordination of the partisan activity resulted in the conducting of Operation Concert against the German forces.

==== Operation Citadel ====
March 1943 order of battle
2nd Panzer Army, 3rd Panzer Army, 2nd Army, 4th Army, 9th Army

April 1943 order of battle
2nd Panzer Army, 3rd Panzer Army, 2nd Army, 4th Army, 9th Army

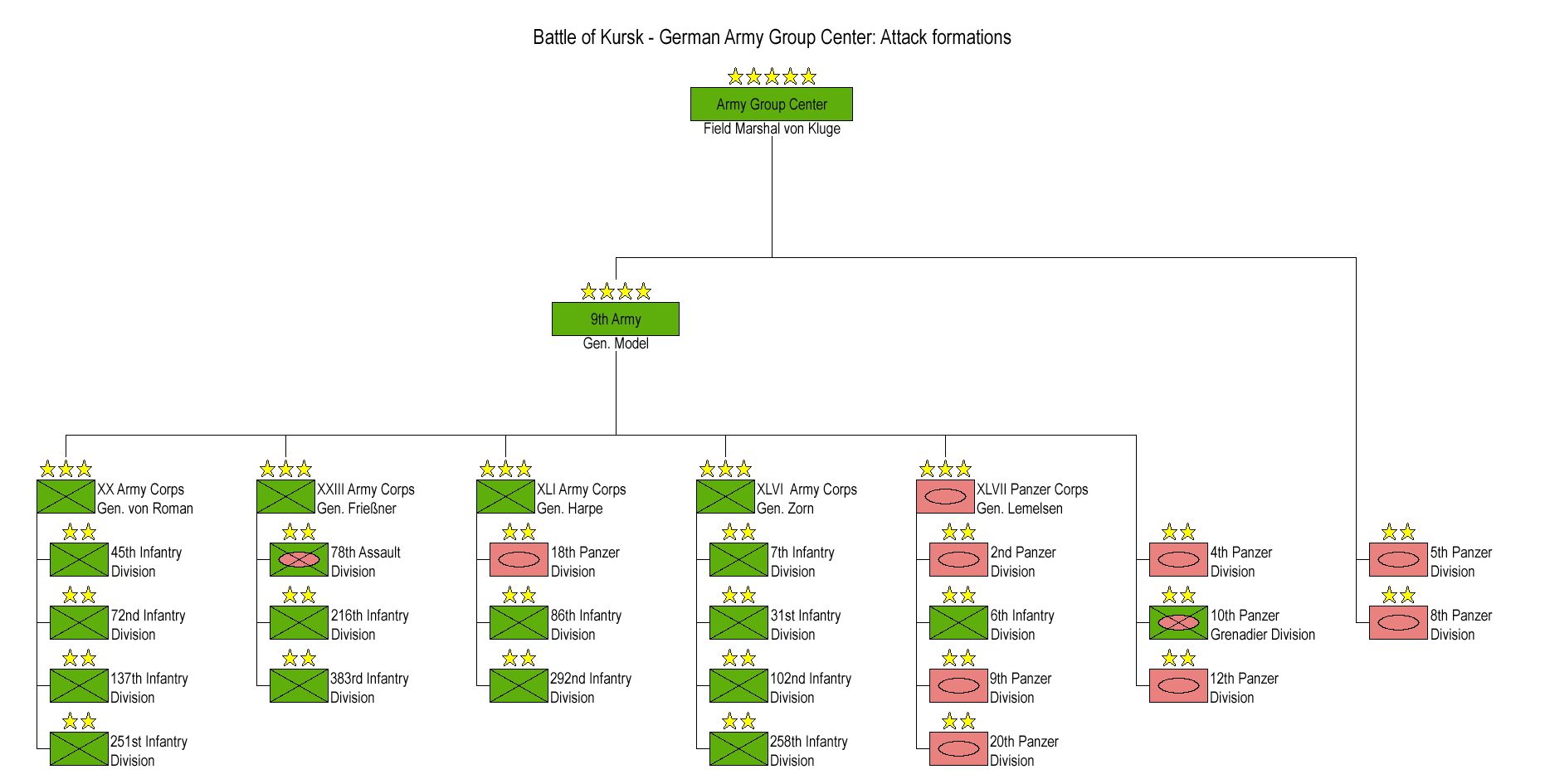
Order of Battle for Army Group Center, July 1943

July 1943 order of battle
2nd Panzer Army, 3rd Panzer Army, 2nd Army, 4th Army, 9th Army

=== Wotan Line defensive campaign ===
September 1943 order of battle
3rd Panzer Army, 2nd Army, 4th Army, 9th Army

November 1943 order of battle
3rd Panzer Army, 2nd Army, 4th Army, 9th Army

January 1944 order of battle
3rd Panzer Army, 2nd Army, 4th Army, 9th Army

== Destruction of Army Group Centre ==
In the spring of 1944, the Soviet High Command started concentrating forces along the front line in central Russia for a summer offensive against Army Group Centre. The Red Army also carried out a deception campaign to convince the Wehrmacht that the main Soviet summer offensive would be launched further south, against Army Group North Ukraine. The German High Command was fooled and armored units were moved south out of Army Group Centre.

The Soviet offensive, code-named Operation Bagration, was launched on 22 June 1944, the third anniversary of Germany's own invasion of the Soviet Union, Operation Barbarossa. 185 Red Army divisions, comprising 2.3 million soldiers and 4,000 tanks and assault guns, smashed into the German positions on a 200km-wide front. The 850,000-strong Army Group Centre was almost completely destroyed by the attack. It is estimated that over 450,000 Germans were killed, wounded, or captured, notably the 57,000 soldiers captured east of Minsk, who were paraded through Moscow on 17 July on Stalin's orders as proof of the immense success of the Soviet offensive. The Soviet forces raced forward, liberating Minsk and the rest of Belorussia by mid-July, and reaching the Vistula and the Baltic States by early August. In terms of casualties this was the greatest German defeat of the entire war.

The commander in chief of Army Group Centre as of 28 June 1944 was Walter Model.

July 1944 order of battle
3rd Panzer Army, 2nd Army, 4th Army, 9th Army, z. Vfg.

The commander in chief as of 16 August 1944 was Georg Hans Reinhardt.

August 1944 order of battle
3rd Panzer Army, 2nd Army, 4th Army, IV SS Panzer Corps

=== Defensive campaign in Poland and Slovakia ===
Discussion of the army group's situation in January 1945 should note that the army groups in the east changed names later that month. The force known as "Army Group Centre" at the start of the Soviet Vistula-Oder Offensive on 12 January 1945 was renamed "Army Group North" less than two weeks after the offensive commenced. At the start of the Vistula-Oder Offensive, the Soviet forces facing Army Group Centre outnumbered the Germans on average by 2:1 in troops, 3:1 in artillery, and 5.5:1 in tanks and self-propelled artillery. The Soviet superiority in troop strength grows to almost 3:1 if 200,000 Volkssturm militia are not included in German personnel strength totals.

=== Defence of the Reich campaign ===
On 25 January 1945, Hitler renamed three army groups. Army Group North became Army Group Courland, Army Group Centre became Army Group North, and Army Group A became Army Group Centre. Army Group Centre fought in the defence of Slovakia and Bohemia-Moravia as well as sections of the German heartland.

Between January and February 1945, Army Group Centre sustained 140,000 casualties, including 15,000 dead, 77,000 wounded (not counting non-evacuees), and 48,000 missing.

==== Battle of Berlin ====
The last Soviet campaign of the war in the European theater, which led to the fall of Berlin and the end of the war in Europe with the surrender of all German forces to the Allies. The three Soviet Fronts involved in the campaign had altogether 2.5 million men, 6,250 tanks, 7,500 aircraft, 41,600 artillery pieces and mortars, 3,255 truck-mounted Katyusha rocket launchers (nicknamed "Stalin Organs" by the Germans), and 95,383 motor vehicles. The campaign started with the battle of Oder-Neisse. Army Group Centre commanded by Ferdinand Schörner (the commander in chief as of 17 January 1945) had a front that included the river Neisse. Before dawn on the morning of 16 April 1945 the 1st Ukrainian Front under the command of General Konev started the attack over the river Neisse with a short but massive bombardment by tens of thousands of artillery pieces.

January 1945 order of battle
3rd Panzer Army, 2nd Army, 4th Army

February 1945 order of battle
1st Panzer Army, 4th Panzer Army, 17th Army (Wehrmacht)

May 1945 order of battle
1st Panzer Army, 4th Panzer Army, 7th Army, 17th Army
Army Group Ostmark

==== Battle of Prague ====
Some of the Army Group Centre continued to resist until 11 May 1945, by which time the overwhelming force of the Soviet Armies sent to liberate Czechoslovakia in the Prague Offensive gave them no option but to surrender or be killed.

May 1945 order of battle
4th Panzer Army, 7th Army, 17th Army
Army Group Ostmark

== Surrender ==
By 7 May 1945, the day that German Chief-of-Staff General Alfred Jodl was negotiating surrender of all German forces at SHAEF, the German Armed Forces High Command (AFHC) had not heard from Schörner since 2 May 1945. He had reported that he intended to fight his way west and surrender his army group to the Americans. On 8 May 1945, a colonel from the Allied Forces High Command was escorted through the American lines to see Schörner. The colonel reported that Schörner had ordered the men under his operational command to observe the surrender but that he could not guarantee that he would be obeyed everywhere. Later that day, Schörner deserted his command and flew to Austria where on 18 May 1945 he was arrested by the Americans.

== Commanders ==
No.	Portrait	Commander	Took office	Left office	Time in office
1	Fedor von Bock	Generalfeldmarschall; Fedor von Bock (1880–1945)	22 June 1941	19 December 1941	180 days
2	Günther von Kluge	Generalfeldmarschall; Günther von Kluge (1882–1944)	19 December 1941	12 October 1943	1 year, 297 days
3	Ernst Busch	Generalfeldmarschall; Ernst Busch (1885–1945)	29 October 1943	28 June 1944	243 days
4	Walter Model	Generalfeldmarschall; Walter Model (1891–1945)	28 June 1944	16 August 1944	49 days
5	Georg-Hans Reinhardt	Generaloberst; Georg-Hans Reinhardt (1887–1963)	16 August 1944	17 January 1945	154 days
6	Ferdinand Schörner	Generaloberst; Ferdinand Schörner (1892–1973)	17 January 1945 (Heeresgruppe A) / 25 January 1945	11 May 1945	114 days

== See also ==
- Army Group South
- Army Group North
- Army Group Centre Rear Area
- Police Regiment Centre

== Bibliography ==
- Erickson, John (1989) [1983]. The Road to Berlin, Stalin's War with Germany, Volume 2. Yale University Press. ISBN 0-300-07813-7.
- Frieser, Karl-Heinz; Schmider, Klaus; Schönherr, Klaus; Schreiber, Gerhard; Ungváry, Krisztián; Wegner, Bernd (2007). Die Ostfront 1943/44 – Der Krieg im Osten und an den Nebenfronten [The Eastern Front 1943–1944: The War in the East and on the Neighbouring Fronts]. Das Deutsche Reich und der Zweite Weltkrieg [Germany and the Second World War] (in German). Vol. VIII. München: Deutsche Verlags-Anstalt. ISBN 978-3421062352.
  - Frieser, Karl-Heinz (2007). "The Withdrawal of Army Group Centre to Belorussia up to the Spring of 1944". In Frieser, Karl-Heinz; et al. (eds.). Eastern Front 1943–1944: The War in the East and on the Neighbouring Fronts. Germany and the Second World War. Vol. 8. Translated by Smerin, Barry. Clarendon Press. pp. 293–337. ISBN 978-0198723462.
  - ————————— (2007). "The Collapse of Army Group Centre in the Summer of 1944". In Frieser, Karl-Heinz; et al. (eds.). Eastern Front 1943–1944: The War in the East and on the Neighbouring Fronts. Germany and the Second World War. Vol. 8. Translated by Smerin, Barry. Clarendon Press. pp. 522–601. ISBN 978-0198723462.
  - ————————— (2007). "The Defensive Successes of Army Group Centre in the Autumn of 1944". In Frieser, Karl-Heinz; et al. (eds.). Eastern Front 1943–1944: The War in the East and on the Neighbouring Fronts. Germany and the Second World War. Vol. 8. Translated by Smerin, Barry. Clarendon Press. pp. 602–620. ISBN 978-0198723462.
- Gerlach, C. Kalkulierte Morde. Hamburg Edition, 2000
- Tessin, Georg (1980). Die Landstreitkräfte: Namensverbände / Die Luftstreitkräfte (Fliegende Verbände) / Flakeinsatz im Reich 1943–1945 [Ground forces: Named units and formations / Air forces (Flying units and formations) / Anti–aircraft service in the Reich 1943–1945]. Verbände und Truppen der deutschen Wehrmacht und Waffen–SS im Zweiten Weltkrieg 1939–1945 (in German). Vol. 14. Osnabrück: Biblio. ISBN 3764811110.
- Ustinov, Dmitriy. Geschichte des Zweiten Welt Krieges, Volume 10. Berlin: Militärverlag der Deutschen Demokratischen Republik, 1982
