= LVIII Panzer Corps =

Military unit of Germany in WW II

LVIII. Reserve-Panzerkorps LVIII. Panzerkorps
- Active: July 1943 - April 1945
- Country: Nazi Germany
- Branch: Army
- Type: Panzer corps
- Role: Armoured warfare
- Size: Corps
- Engagements: World War II: Battle of the Bulge; Battle of St. Vith

Commanders
- Notable commanders: Walter Krüger

LVIII Panzer Corps was a panzer corps in the German Army during World War II.

This corps was established on 28 July 1943 as LVIII. Reserve-Panzerkorps in Wehrkreis V. On 6 July 1944, it was renamed LVIII Panzerkorps.

It was sent to Le Mans in France on 20 July 1944 to fight the allies. It retreated through France before fighting in the Ardennes Offensive in winter 1944–1945. It ended the war in the Ruhr Pocket in April 1945 subordinated to the 5th Panzer Army/Heeresgruppe B.

== Commanders ==
- General der Panzertruppen Leo Freiherr Geyr von Schweppenburg – From 28 July 1943 to 30 November 1943
- General der Panzertruppe Hans-Karl Freiherr von Esebeck – From 1 December 1943 to 10 February 1944
- General der Panzertruppe Walter Krüger – From 10 February 1944 to 25 March 1945
- Generalleutnant Walter Botsch – From 25 March 1945 to April 1945

== Area of operations ==
- France : July 1944 – December 1944
- Ardennes : December 1944
- Western Germany : January 1945 – April 1945

== Sources ==
- LVIII. Panzerkorps on lexikon-der-wehrmacht.de
