= Franz Beyer (general) =

German general in the Wehrmacht (1892-1968)

- Born: 27 May 1892; Bautzen, Kingdom of Saxony, German Empire
- Died: 15 October 1968 (aged 76); Bad Wiessee, Bavaria, West Germany
- Military career
- Allegiance: German Empire; Nazi Germany
- Branch: Imperial German Navy; German Army
- Service years: 1911–1919; 1935-1945
- Rank: General der Infanterie
- Commands: XVII Army Corps; LVII Panzer Corps; V Army Corps; XXXXIX Mountain Corps; LXXX Army Corps
- Conflicts: World War I; World War II; Invasion of Poland; Battle of France; Operation Barbarossa; Battle of Kiev (1941); First Battle of Kharkov; Battle of the Caucasus; Italian Campaign; Battle of Monte Cassino; Crimean Offensive (1944); Siegfried Line Campaign; Battle of Metz; Battle of the Bulge; Battle of Frankfurt
- Awards: Knight's Cross of the Iron Cross

Franz Beyer (27 May 1892 – 15 October 1968) was a German general in the Wehrmacht during World War II who held commands at the divisional and corps levels. He was a recipient of the Knight's Cross of the Iron Cross of Nazi Germany.

== Awards and decorations ==
- Iron Cross (1914) 2nd Class (10 October 1915) & 1st Class (16 June 1918)
- Friedrich August Cross 2nd Class with Swords (22 August 1916)
- Bavarian Military Merit Order 4th Class with Swords (20 December 1916)
- Albert Order 2nd Class with Swords (6 December 1917)
- Honour Cross of the World War 1914/1918 (1 November 1934)
- Clasp to the Iron Cross (1939) 2nd Class (13 September 1939) & 1st Class (1 October 1939)
- Knight's Cross of the Iron Cross on 12 September 1941 as Oberst and commander of Infanterie-Regiment 131

Military offices
Preceded by Generalleutnant Fritz Hengen	Commander of 331. Infanterie-Division; 30 December 1941 – 22 February 1943	Succeeded by Generalleutnant Karl-Ludwig Rhein
Preceded by Generalleutnant Heinrich-Anton Deboi	Commander of 44. Infanterie-Division; 1 March 1943 – 1 January 1944	Succeeded by Generalleutnant Dr. rer. pol. Friedrich Franek
Preceded by General der Gebirgstruppen Hans Kreysing	Commander of XVII. Armeekorps; 27 April 1944 – 25 May 1944	Succeeded by General der Gebirgstruppen Hans Kreysing
Preceded by General der Panzertruppe Friedrich Kirchner	Commander of LVII. Panzer-Korps; 25 May 1944 – 2 June 1944	Succeeded by General der Panzertruppe Friedrich Kirchner
Preceded by General der Infanterie Friedrich-Wilhelm Müller	Commander of V. Armeekorps; 2 June 1944 – July 1944	Succeeded by General der Artillerie Kurt Wäger
Preceded by General der Artillerie Walter Hartmann	Commander of XXXXIX. Gebirgskorps; 26 July 1944 – 4 August 1944	Succeeded by General der Artillerie Walter Hartmann
Preceded by General der Artillerie Curt Gallenkamp	Commander of LXXX. Armeekorps; 7 August 1944 – 28 April 1945	Succeeded by none
