= Karl Rhein =

Karl Ludwig Rhein
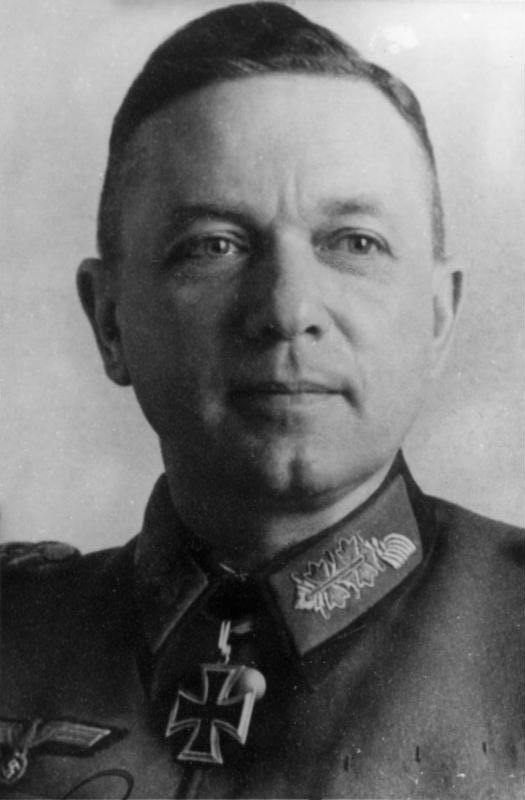
- Born: 30 March 1894
- Died: 27 March 1988 (aged 93)
- Military career
- Allegiance: German Empire; Weimar Republic; Nazi Germany
- Branch: Army
- Service years: 1914-1945
- Rank: Generalleutnant
- Commands: 311th Infantry Division; 295th Infantry Division
- Conflicts: World War I World War II
- Awards: Knight's Cross of the Iron Cross

Karl Rhein (30 March 1894 – 27 March 1988) was a German general (Generalleutnant) in the Wehrmacht during World War II. He was a recipient of the Knight's Cross of the Iron Cross of Nazi Germany.

== Awards ==
- Knight's Cross of the Iron Cross on 6 March 1942 as Oberst and commander of Infanterie-Regiment 439

Military offices
Preceded by General der Infanterie Dr. Franz Beyer	Commander of 331. Infanterie-Division; 22 February 1943 – 1 January 1944	Succeeded by Generalmajor Heinz Furbach
Preceded by Generalmajor Heinz Furbach	Commander of 331. Infanterie-Division; 25 April 1944 – 1 August 1944	Succeeded by Generalleutnant Walter Steinmüller
Preceded by Generalleutnant Rudolf Dinter	Commander of 295. Infanterie-Division; 27 July 1944 – 26 January 1945	Succeeded by Generalleutnant Siegfried Macholz
