= Friedrich-Wilhelm Dernen =

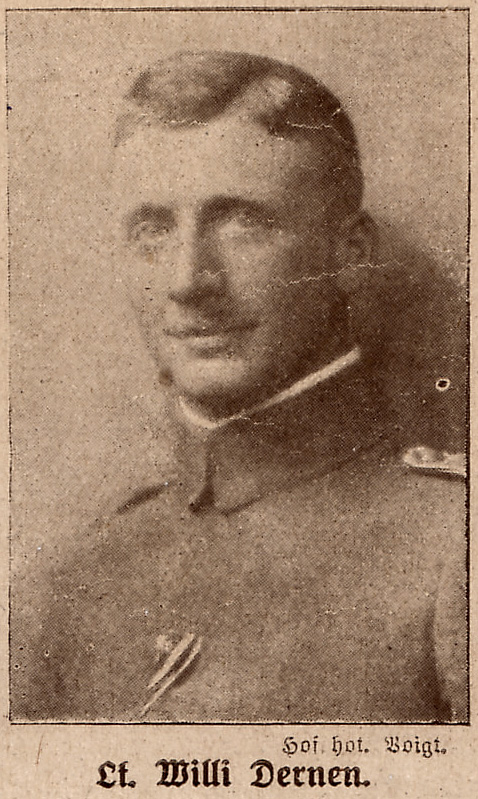
Friedrich-Wilhelm Dernen

Friedrich-Wilhelm Dernen (born February 15, 1884, in Köln, died February 15, 1967, in Bad Homburg) was a German officer in the Wehrmacht during World War II.

== Awards ==
- Pour le Mérite on 29 August 1918
- German Cross in Gold on 11 January 1942 as Oberstleutnant in the III./Infanterie-Regiment 36
