= Leonhard Kaupisch =

German general (1878–1945)

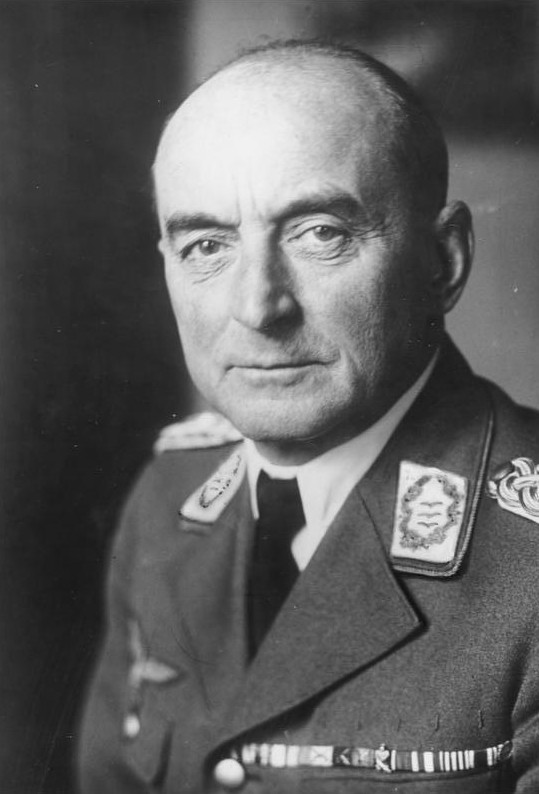
- Kaupisch in 1940
- Born: 1 September 1878; Bitterfeld, Province of Saxony, German Empire
- Died: 26 September 1945 (aged 67); Weimar, Allied-occupied Germany
- Military career
- Allegiance: German Empire; Weimar Republic; Nazi Germany
- Branch: German Army; Luftwaffe
- Service years: 1898–1942
- Rank: General der Flieger; General der Artillerie
- Commands: Supreme Military Commander, occupied Denmark
- Conflicts: World War I; World War II; Operation Weserübung
- Awards: Knight's Cross of House Order of Hohenzollern

Leonhard Kaupisch (1 September 1878 – 26 September 1945) was a German general during World War II who served as Supreme Military Commander of occupied Denmark.

== World War I and interwar period ==
Kaupisch entered the army in 1898; from 1907 to 1909 he attended the war academy in Lichterfelde. From 1911 he served with the German General Staff in Berlin. During World War I, Kaupisch served on the General Staff and rose gradually in the ranks and in 1917 promoted to Major. He also received the Iron Cross 2nd Class and the Knight's Cross of House Order of Hohenzollern in the same period.

After World War I, Kaupisch moved into the new Reichswehr and was assigned to the Gruppenkommando 2 at Kassel. In 1923 he took command of an artillery regiment. From there he moved to artillery school in Jüterbog. He continued his career in artillery until he departed in 1932 from his post with the level of Generalleutnant.

On 1 April 1934, he joined the Luftwaffe where in December 1935 he was appointed General der Flieger. By the end of March 1938 he departed from the Luftwaffe, but in early 1939 he again joined the army.

== World War II ==
In mid-September 1939, Kaupisch was military governor of Danzig-West Prussia. In late 1939, his staff was adopted to Höheres Kommando z.b.V. XXXI. It was as head of this command that he April 9, 1940 led Operation Weserübung Süd, forcing the occupation of Denmark. The OPROP! leaflets with a call to refrain from resistance which German planes dropped during the early morning were signed by Kaupisch.

Until 1 June 1940, he was Supreme Commander of the German troops in Denmark. He then continued in the army reserve as general of artillery until his retirement on April 10, 1942.

== Post-war ==
Anticipating the imminent defeat of Germany, Kaupisch and his family left their home in Westend, Berlin and settled in Bad Berka, a spa town lying approximately 10 km south of Weimar. In May 1945, the city was captured by the US Army. That summer, he was also interviewed by a Danish journalist who noted that the retired General had adapted to the peacetime lifestyle. When the region of Weimar became part of the Soviet zone of occupation, Kaupisch was arrested and marched to an internment camp at Weimar. Kaupisch died there on 26 September 1945.

== Awards and decorations ==
- Iron Cross of 1914, 2nd class
- Iron Cross of 1914, 1st class
- The Honour Cross of the World War 1914/1918
- Knight's Cross of the Royal House Order of Hohenzollern with Swords

Military offices
| Preceded by None | Commander of Höheres Kommando z.b.V. XXXI; 7 November 1939 – 9 April 1940 | Succeeded by General der Artillerie Curt Gallenkamp |
| Preceded by None | Military Commander Denmark; 9 April 1940 – 1 June 1940 | Succeeded by Erich Lüdke |
