= XXXX Panzer Corps =

- Active: 26 January 1940 - 8 May 1945
- Country: Nazi Germany
- Branch: Army
- Type: Panzer corps
- Role: Armoured warfare
- Size: Corps
- Engagements: World War II

XXXX Panzer Corps was a tank corps in the German Army during World War II.

== History ==
The XXXX. Armeekorps was formed on 26 January 1940 in Lübeck in the Wehrkreis X. It took part in the invasions of France and Greece before being sent to the Eastern Front. On 15 September 1940 it was converted into a motorized corps under the name XXXX. Armeekorps (motorisiert) and was renamed XXXX. Panzerkorps on 9 July 1942.

The XXXX Panzer Corps fought at Kharkov, the advance to the Don River, and to the Terek in the Caucasus. The corps later withdrew toward Rostov and later into Romania.

The corps was transferred to East Prussia and withdrew toward Memel and ended the war in central Silesia.

== Commanders ==
- 15.02.1940 - 14.01.1942 : Georg Stumme
- 15.01.1942 - 16.01.1942 : Hans Zorn
- 16.02.1942 - 09.07.1942 : Georg Stumme
- 20.07.1942 - 30.09.1942 : Leo Freiherr Geyr von Schweppenburg
- 30.09.1942 - 13.11.1942 : Gustav Fehn
- 13.11.1942 - 01.10.1943 : Siegfried Henrici
- 01.10.1943 - 11.11.1943 : Ferdinand Schörner
- 12.11.1943 - 15.11.1943 : Hermann Balck
- 19.11.1943 - 26.11.1943 : Heinrich Eberbach
- 27.11.1943 - 31.01.1944 : Ferdinand Schörner
- 01.02.1944 - 31.08.1944 : Otto von Knobelsdorff
- 01.09.1944 - 08.05.1945 : Siegfried Henrici

== Bibliography ==
- Tessin, Georg. Verbände und Truppen der deutschen Wehrmacht und Waffen–SS im Zweiten Weltkrieg 1939–1945 [Units and Troops of the German Military and Waffen-SS in the Second World War 1939–1945] (in German). Vol. 5: Die Landstreitkräfte 31–70 (Units 31–70). Osnabrück: Biblio.
