= LVII Panzer Corps =

LVII. Armeekorps LVII. Panzerkorps
- Active: February 1941 - May 1945
- Country: Nazi Germany
- Branch: Army
- Type: Panzer corps
- Role: Armoured warfare
- Size: Corps
- Engagements: World War II

Commanders
- Notable commanders: Friedrich Kirchner

LVII Panzer Corps was a panzer corps in the German Army during World War II.

This corps was activated in Augsburg in February 1941 as the LVII Army Corps, for the German invasion of the Soviet Union, which commenced on 22 June 1941. It fought in the Battle of Białystok–Minsk and in the Battle of Moscow.

On 21 June 1942, the Corps was renamed LVII Panzer Corps . It fought at Rostov, and then in the Battle of the Caucasus under the control of Army Group A.

After the encirclement of the 6th Army and portions of the 4th Panzer Army with the meeting of Soviet forces at Kalach, Army Group Don was formed to establish a perimeter to stop the Soviet advance and ultimately counterattack to relieve the encircled forces in Stalingrad. The LVII Panzer Corps was transferred from Army Group A to the newly formed Army Group Don under General Manstein. The LVII Panzer Corps was tasked with leading Operation Winter Thunderstorm from the southwest towards Stalingrad. The LVII Panzer Corps Headquarters along with the 23rd Panzer Division arrived from Army Group A. The LVII Panzer Corps was subsequently joined first by the 6th Panzer Division and then the 17th Panzer Division.

The LVII Panzer Corps initially fought for the town of Pokhleblin from December 3-4, 1942 to establish a base for the attack towards Stalingrad. From December 6 - 12, 1942, fought a series of battles in their attempts to push north, finally advancing to the Aksai River on December 13, 1942. On December 14 - 15, the 6th Panzer Division attempted to push towards Verkhne Kuumski where it was engaged by a series of Soviet armored forces, forcing a retreat back to the Aksai Front. on December 17 - 19, 1942, the LVII Panzer Corps launched attacks towards Verkhne Kumski again with the forces finally breaking through to Vassilyevska on December 19, 1942. The LVII Panzer Corps exploited to Myshkova on December 20 where new Soviet forces stopped the attack forcing the LVII Panzer Corps to defend its positions. Developments elsewhere by the Soviet forces, in particular Operation Little Saturn, forced the LVII Panzer Corps to break-off the Operation Winter Thunderstorm on December 23, 1942, and begin to retreat.

It fought south-west of Stalingrad and then retreated along the Don. In 1943 it was active in the Donets region and in Kursk. It retreated over the Romanian border before being attached to the 3rd Hungarian Army and transferred to the south of Hungary. There it fought in the Battle of Budapest and ended the war in Silesia.

== Commanders ==
- General of the Tank Troops (General der Panzertruppe) Adolf-Friedrich Kuntzen - From 15 February 1941 to 15 November 1941.
- General of the Tank Troops (General der Panzertruppe) Friedrich Kirchner - From 15 November 1941 to 12 January 1942
- General of the Tank Troops (General der Panzertruppe) Adolf-Friedrich Kuntzen - From 12 to 31 January 1942
- General of the Tank Troops (General der Panzertruppe) Friedrich Kirchner - From 31 January 1942 to 30 November 1943
- General of the Tank Troops (General der Panzertruppe) Hans-Karl Freiherr von Esebeck - From 30 November 1943 to 19 February 1944
- General of the Tank Troops (General der Panzertruppe) Friedrich Kirchner - From 19 February 1944 to 25 May 1944
- Infantry General (General der Infanterie) Franz Beyer - From 25 May 1944 to 2 June 1944
- * General of the Tank Troops (General der Panzertruppe) Friedrich Kirchner - From 2 June 1944 to 8 May 1945

== Area of operations ==
- Eastern Front, central sector - From June 1942 to July 1944
- Southern Hungary - From July 1944 to January 1945
- Silesia - From January 1945 to May 1945
