= LXXXV Army Corps =

The LXXXV Army Corps (German: LXXXV. Armeekorps) was an army corps of the German Wehrmacht during World War II. The corps existed between 1944 and 1945 and had been preceded by a formation known as Group Knieß (German: Gruppe Knieß), with its command designated General Command Knieß (German: General-Kommando Knieß) between 1943 and 1944.

== History ==
Group Knieß, also known as General Command Knieß, was formed in October 1943 in southern France. The formations was named after its initial commander, Baptist Knieß. Under the supervision of the 19th Army, Group Knieß remained on defensive duty in France until the Normandy landings on 6 June 1944.

On 10 July 1944, Corps Kniess was upgraded to become the LXXXV Army Corps. The LXXXV Army Corps remained under the supervision of the 19th Army until December 1944, when the corps was transferred to the 7th Army in the Ardennes. After a stay in the Saar Palatinate region between February and March 1945 under the 1st Army, the LXXXV was transferred back to the 7th Army in Hesse and Thuringia in April. At the end of the war, the LXXXV Army Corps was commanded by Smilo Freiherr von Lüttwitz, who had held that post since 26 March 1945.

== Structure ==
Organizational structure of Group Knieß and the LXXXV (85th) Army Corps
Name	Year	Date	Commander	Subordinate units	Army	Army Group	Operational area
Gruppe Knieß	1943	4 October	Baptist Knieß	FH, 715th Infantry	19th Army	Army Group D	Southern France
Gruppe Knieß	1943	8 November	Baptist Knieß	242nd Infantry, 715th Infantry	19th Army	Army Group D	Southern France
Gruppe Knieß	1943	3 December	Baptist Knieß	148th Infantry, 242nd Infantry	19th Army	Army Group D	Southern France
Gruppe Knieß	1944	1 January	Baptist Knieß	148th Infantry, 242nd Infantry, 244th Infantry	19th Army	Army Group D	Southern France
Gruppe Knieß	1944	12 February	Baptist Knieß	148th Infantry, 242nd Infantry, 244th Infantry	19th Army	Army Group D	Southern France
Gruppe Knieß	1944	11 March	Baptist Knieß	148th Infantry, 242nd Infantry, 244th Infantry	19th Army	Army Group D	Southern France
Gruppe Knieß	1944	8 April	Baptist Knieß	244th Infantry, 338th Infantry	19th Army	Army Group D	Southern France
Gruppe Knieß	1944	17 May	Baptist Knieß	244th Infantry, 338th Infantry	19th Army	Army Group G	Southern France
Gruppe Knieß	1944	12 June	Baptist Knieß	244th Infantry, 338th Infantry	19th Army	Army Group G	Southern France
LXXXV Army Corps	1944	17 July (Note: Although LXXXV Army Corps was formed on 10 July 1944, the papers of 7th Army still (likely erroneously) contain Group Knieß for their entry on 17 July 1944.)	Baptist Knieß	244th Infantry, 338th Infantry	19th Army	Army Group G	Belfort
LXXXV Army Corps	1944	31 August	Baptist Knieß	198th Infantry, 338th Infantry	19th Army	Army Group G	Belfort
LXXXV Army Corps	1944	16 September	Baptist Knieß	11th Panzer	19th Army	Army Group G	Belfort
LXXXV Army Corps	1944	13 October	Baptist Knieß	159th Infantry, 189th Infantry, Panzerbrigade 106	19th Army	Army Group G	Belfort
LXXXV Army Corps	1944	5 November	Baptist Knieß	159th Infantry, 189th Infantry, 338th Infantry	19th Army	Army Group G	Belfort
LXXXV Army Corps	1944	26 November	Friedrich-August Schack	None	7th Army	Army Group B	Ardennes
LXXXV Army Corps	1944	31 December	Baptist Knieß	79th Infantry, 352nd Infantry Division	7th Army	Army Group B	Ardennes
LXXXV Army Corps	1945	19 February	Baptist Knieß	347th Infantry, 719th Infantry	1st Army	Army Group G	Saarpfalz
LXXXV Army Corps	1945	1 March	Baptist Knieß	347th Infantry, 559th Infantry, 719th Infantry	1st Army	Army Group G	Saarpfalz
LXXXV Army Corps	1945	12 April	Smilo Freiherr von Lüttwitz	11th Panzer, Kampfgruppe Schroeder	7th Army	Army Group G	Hesse / Thuringia

== Noteworthy individuals ==
- Baptist Knieß, corps commander of Corps Knieß and the LXXXV Army Corps (October 1943 – 10 July 1944, 10 July 1944 – 15 November 1944, 16 December 1944 – 26 March 1945).
- Friedrich-August Schack, corps commander of the LXXXV Army Corps (15 November 1944 – 16 December 1944).
- Smilo Freiherr von Lüttwitz, corps commander of the LXXXV Army Corps (26 March 1945 – 8 May 1945).
