= XXXXVI Panzer Corps =

XXXXVI Army Corps XXXXVI Panzer Corps
- Active: 20 June 1940 - 3 May 1945
- Country: Nazi Germany
- Branch: Army
- Type: Panzer corps
- Role: Armoured warfare
- Size: Corps
- Engagements: World War II: Kamenets-Podolsky pocket

XXXXVI Panzer Corps (46th) was a tank corps of the German Army during World War II that participated in the invasion of Yugoslavia.

The Corps was created as the XXXXVI Army Corps and converted to a Panzer Corps on 21 June 1942.

The Panzer Corps took part in Operation Barbarossa and fought in Kiev, Putyvl, Vyazma and Volokolamsk. It later fought in Rusa-Volokolamsk, Rzhev, Vyazma and Yelnya before taking part in Operation Zitadelle (Kursk). It retired to the Svin area in September 1943 and to Mozyr in December. It was transferred to the southern sector in January 1944 and fought at Vinnitsa and later on the Dniester. It withdrew to Poland and ended the war in Pomerania by surrendering to British forces, by which point it only had the 547th Volksgrenadier Division and the 2nd Naval Division under its command.

== Commanders ==
- 20 June 1940 - 11 June 1942 : Heinrich von Vietinghoff
- 11 June 1942 - 20 November 1942 : Hans Zorn
- 20 November 1942 - 20 June 1943 : Hans-Karl Freiherr von Esebeck
- 20 June 1943 - 2 August 1943 : Hans Zorn
- 5 August 1943 - 21 March 1944 : Hans Gollnick
- 22 March 1944 - 3 July 1944 : Friedrich Schulz
- 3 July 1944 - 23 July 1944 : Fritz Becker
- 24 July 1944 - 28 August 1944 : Smilo Freiherr von Lüttwitz
- 29 August 1944 - 20 September 1944 : Maximilian Felzmann
- 21 September 1944 - 19 January 1945 : Walter Fries
- 19 January 1945 - 3 May 1945 : Martin Gareis

== Literature ==
- Bußmann, Walter (1993). "Kursk-Orel-Dnjepr. Erlebnisse und Erfahrungen im Stab des XXXXVI. Panzerkorps während des Unternehmens Zitadelle" [Kursk-Orel-Dnieper. Experiences in the Staff of XXXXVI Panzer Corps during Operation Citadel]. Vierteljahrshefte für Zeitgeschichte (in German). Oldenbourg.
