= OB West =

WW2 German military command on the Western Front

Oberbefehlshaber West (German: initials OB West) (German: "Commander-in-Chief [in the] West") was the overall commander of the Westheer, the German armed forces on the Western Front during World War II. It was directly subordinate to the Oberkommando der Wehrmacht (the German armed forces High Command). The area under the command of the OB West varied as the war progressed. At its furthest extent, it reached the French Atlantic coast. By the end of World War II in Europe, it was reduced to commanding troops in Bavaria.

== Commanders ==
No.	Portrait	Name	Took office	Left office	Time in office
1	Gerd von Rundstedt	Generalfeldmarschall; Gerd von Rundstedt (1875–1953)	10 October 1940	1 April 1941	173 days
2	Erwin von Witzleben	Generalfeldmarschall; Erwin von Witzleben (1881–1944)	1 May 1941	15 March 1942	348 days
(1)	Gerd von Rundstedt	Generalfeldmarschall; Gerd von Rundstedt (1875–1953) (Note: Officially reported as retiring due to age and ill-health.)	15 March 1942	2 July 1944	2 years, 109 days
3	Günther von Kluge	Generalfeldmarschall; Günther von Kluge (1882–1944) (Note: Committed suicide on 19 August 1944 after being recalled to Berlin.)	2 July 1944	17 August 1944	46 days
–	Walter Model	Generalfeldmarschall; Walter Model (1891–1945); Acting (Note: Temporary replacement, continued as commander of Army Group B.)	17 August 1944	3 September 1944	17 days
(1)	Gerd von Rundstedt	Generalfeldmarschall; Gerd von Rundstedt (1875–1953) (Note: Replaced after Allies crossed the Rhine.)	3 September 1944	11 March 1945	189 days
4	Albert Kesselring	Generalfeldmarschall; Albert Kesselring (1885–1960)	11 March 1945	22 April 1945	42 days

== Order of battle from June 1944 to January 1945 ==
OB West
Army Group B			Panzer Group West	Army Group G		Army Group H		Army Group D
Seventh Army	Fifteenth Army	Sixth SS Panzer Army (Dec 1944-Jan 1945)	Fifth Panzer Army	First Army	Nineteenth Army	1st Parachute Army	25th Army	Structure of the OB West
LXXXIV Corps	LXXXVIII Corps	I SS Panzer Corps	I SS Panzer Corps	XII Corps	LXII Corps	II Parachute Corps	XXX Corps	
II Parachute Corps	LXXXVIII Corps	II SS Panzer Corps	XLVII Panzer Corps	XXIV Corps	LXXXV Corps	LXXXVI Corps		
LIII Corps (Dec 1944)	LXXXVI Corps	LXVII Corps	II SS Panzer Corps	XXIV Corps	LXXXV Corps	LXXXVI Corps		
