= List of Knight's Cross of the Iron Cross with Oak Leaves recipients (1945) =

The Knight's Cross of the Iron Cross (Ritterkreuz des Eisernen Kreuzes) and its variants were the highest awards in the military and paramilitary forces of Nazi Germany during World War II. This decoration was awarded for a wide range of reasons and across all ranks, from a senior commander for skilled leadership of his troops in battle to a low-ranking soldier for a single act of extreme gallantry. The Knight's Cross of the Iron Cross with Oak Leaves (Ritterkreuz des Eisernen Kreuzes mit Eichenlaub) was introduced on 3 June 1940 to further distinguish those who had already received the Knight's Cross of the Iron Cross and who continued to show merit in combat bravery or military success. A total of 7 awards were made in 1940; 50 in 1941; 111 in 1942; 192 in 1943; 328 in 1944, and 194 in 1945, giving a total of 882 recipients—excluding the 8 foreign recipients of the award.

The number of 882 Oak Leaves recipients is based on the analysis and acceptance of the order commission of the Association of Knight's Cross Recipients (AKCR). However, author Veit Scherzer has challenged the validity of 27 of these listings. With the exception of Hermann Fegelein, all of the disputed recipients had received the award in 1945, when the deteriorating situation during the final days of World War II in Germany left a number of nominations incomplete and pending in various stages of the approval process. Fegelein received the Oak Leaves in 1942, but was sentenced to death by Adolf Hitler and executed by SS-Gruppenführer Johann Rattenhuber's Reichssicherheitsdienst (RSD) on 28 April 1945 after a court-martial led by SS-Brigadeführer and Generalmajor of the Waffen-SS Wilhelm Mohnke. The sentence was carried out the same day. The death sentence, according to German law, resulted in the loss of all orders and honorary signs.

== Background ==
The Knight's Cross of the Iron Cross and its higher grades were based on four separate enactments. The first enactment, Reichsgesetzblatt I S. 1573 of 1 September 1939 instituted the Iron Cross (Eisernes Kreuz), the Knight's Cross of the Iron Cross and the Grand Cross of the Iron Cross (Großkreuz des Eisernen Kreuzes). Article 2 of the enactment mandated that the award of a higher class be preceded by the award of all preceding classes. As the war progressed, some of the recipients of the Knight's Cross distinguished themselves further and a higher grade, the Oak Leaves to the Knight's Cross of the Iron Cross, was instituted. The Oak Leaves, as they were commonly referred to, were based on the enactment Reichsgesetzblatt I S. 849 of 3 June 1940. In 1941, two higher grades of the Knight's Cross were instituted. The enactment Reichsgesetzblatt I S. 613 of 28 September 1941 introduced the Knight's Cross of the Iron Cross with Oak Leaves and Swords and the Knight's Cross of the Iron Cross with Oak Leaves, Swords and Diamonds. At the end of 1944 the final grade, the Knight's Cross of the Iron Cross with Golden Oak Leaves, Swords, and Diamonds, based on the enactment Reichsgesetzblatt 1945 I S. 11 of 29 December 1944, became the final variant of the Knight's Cross authorized.

== Recipients of 1945 ==
Knight's Cross of the Iron Cross with Oak Leaves
| Year | Number of presentations | Posthumous presentations |
|---|---|---|
| 1940 | 7 | 0 |
| 1941 | 50 | 3 |
| 1942 | 111 | 7 |
| 1943 | 192 | 17 |
| 1944 | 328 | 46 |
| 1945 | 194 | 19 |

The Oberkommando der Wehrmacht (Supreme Command of the Armed Forces) kept separate Knight's Cross lists for each of the three military branches—Heer (Army), Kriegsmarine (Navy), and Luftwaffe (Air Force)—and also for the Waffen-SS. Within each of these lists a unique sequential number was assigned to each recipient. The same numbering was applied to the higher grades of the Knight's Cross, one list per grade. Of the 194 awards made in 1945, 19 presentations were made posthumously. Heer members received 127 of the medals, 5 went to the Kriegsmarine, 37 to the Luftwaffe, and 25 to the Waffen-SS.

The Knight's Cross of the Iron Cross with Oak Leaves and Swords was awarded to one of the 194 Oak Leaves recipients of 1945. However, Viet Scherzer has disputed the listing of General of the Infantry Hermann Niehoff on the basis of poor record keeping associated with the deteriorating situation of Germany during the final days of World War II. The sequential numbers greater than 843 for the Knight's Cross of the Iron Cross with Oak Leaves and 143 for the Knight's Cross of the Iron Cross with Oak Leaves and Swords are unofficial and were assigned by the Association of Knight's Cross Recipients (AKCR) and are therefore denoted in parentheses. The recipients are ordered and numbered chronologically. The rank listed is the recipient's rank at the time the Knight's Cross with Oak Leaves was awarded.

This along with the + (plus) indicates that a higher grade of Knight's Cross was awarded as well.
This along with the * (asterisk) indicates that the Knight's Cross was awarded posthumously.
This along with the ? (question mark) indicates that author Veit Scherzer has expressed doubt regarding the veracity or formal correctness of the listing.

| Number | Name | Service | Rank | Role and unit (Note: For an explanation of the various naming schemes used by the Luftwaffe, Heer, Kriegsmarine and Waffen-SS refer to nomenclature used by the Wehrmacht and Waffen-SS.) | Date of award | Notes | Image |
|---|---|---|---|---|---|---|---|
| 689 | Heinrich Baron von Behr | Heer | Oberst | Commander of Panzergrenadier-Regiment 200 | 9 January 1945 | — | — |
| 690 | Kurt-Hermann Freiherr von Mühlen | Heer | Generalmajor | Commander of the 559. Volksgrenadier-Division | 9 January 1945 | — | — |
| 691 | Walter Lucht | Heer | General der Artillerie | Commanding general of the LXVI. Armeekorps | 9 January 1945 | — | A man wearing a military uniform and peaked cap with an Iron Cross displayed at the front of his uniform collar. |
| 692 | Sigmund-Ulrich Freiherr von Gravenreuth | Luftwaffe | Oberstleutnant | Geschwaderkommodore of Kampfgeschwader 30 | 9 January 1945* | Killed in flying accident 16 October 1944 | |
| 693 | Kurt Gröschke | Luftwaffe | Oberstleutnant | Commander of Fallschirmjäger-Regiment 15 | 9 January 1945 | — | A man wearing a military uniform with an Iron Cross displayed at the front of his uniform collar. |
| 694 | Kurt Herzog | Heer | General der Artillerie | Commanding general of the XXXVIII. Armeekorps | 12 January 1945 | — | — |
| 695 | Alois Eisele | Heer | Major | Commander of the III./Grenadier-Regiment 61 | 12 January 1945 | — | — |
| 696 | Volprecht Riedesel Freiherr zu Eisenbach | Luftwaffe | Oberstleutnant | Geschwaderkommodore of Kampfgeschwader 54 (J) | 14 January 1945 | — | — |
| 697 | Joachim Brendel | Luftwaffe | Hauptmann | Gruppenkommandeur of the III./Jagdgeschwader 51 "Mölders" | 14 January 1945 | — | — |
| 698 | Wilhelm Hasse | Heer | General der Infanterie | Commanding general of the II. Armeekorps | 14 January 1945 | — | |
| 699 | Hans-Detlef Gollert-Hansen | Heer | Rittmeister of the Reserves | Commander of the II./Reiter-Regiment 31 | 14 January 1945 | — | — |
| 700 | Claus Breger | Heer | Hauptmann | Commander of the I./Füsilier-Regiment 27 | 14 January 1945* | Died of wounds on 17 December 1944 | — |
| 701 | Bruno Streckenbach | Waffen-SS | SS-Gruppenführer and Generalleutnant of the Waffen-SS (Note: According to Scherzer as SS-Gruppenführer and Generalleutnant of the Waffen-SS and the Reserves.) | Commander of the 19. Waffen-Grenadier Division der Waffen-SS (lett. Nr. 2) | 16 January 1945 | — | — |
| 702 | Max Reinwald | Heer | Oberst of the Reserves | Commander of Grenadier-Regiment 19 "List" | 18 January 1945 | — | — |
| 703 | Richard Henze | Heer | Oberstleutnant of the Reserves | Commander of Grenadier-Regiment 489 | 18 January 1945 | — | — |
| 704 | Walther Risse | Heer | Generalleutnant | Commander of the 225. Infanterie-Division | 18 January 1945 | — | — |
| 705 | Alexander Löhr | Luftwaffe | Generaloberst | Commander-in-chief of Heeresgruppe E | 20 January 1945 | — | A man wearing a military uniform with an Iron Cross displayed at the front of his uniform collar. |
| 706 | Gerhard Schmidhuber | Heer | Generalmajor | Commander of the 13. Panzer-Division | 21 January 1945 | — | A man wearing a military uniform and peaked cap with an Iron Cross displayed at the front of his uniform collar. |
| 707 | Wilhelm Schöning | Heer | Major of the Reserves | Leader of Panzergrenadier-Regiment 66 | 21 January 1945 | — | — |
| 708 | Herbert Kündiger | Heer | Oberstleutnant | Leader of Kampfgruppe of the 271. Volksgrenadier-Division in the fortress Budapest (Note: According to Scherzer as leader of a Kampfgruppe in the 271. Volksgrenadier-Division in Budapest (Grenadier-Regiment 978).) | 21 January 1945 | — | — |
| 709 | Albert Henze | Heer | Generalmajor | Commander of Gruppe Henze (Feld-Division 21 (L)) | 21 January 1945 | — | — |
| 710 | Erich Reuter | Heer | Generalmajor | Commander of the 46. Infanterie-Division | 21 January 1945 | — | |
| 711 | Kurt Dahlmann | Luftwaffe | Major | Geschwaderkommodore of Nachtschlachtgeschwader 20 | 24 January 1945 | — | — |
| 712 | Kurt Plenzat | Luftwaffe | Leutnant | Pilot in the 2./Schlachtgeschwader 2 "Immelmann" | 24 January 1945 | — | — |
| 713 | Herbert Rollwage | Luftwaffe | Leutnant | Staffelkapitän of the 5./Jagdgeschwader 53 | 24 January 1945 | — | — |
| 714 | Max Schäfer | Waffen-SS | SS-Standartenführer (Note: According to Scherzer as SS-Obersturmbannführer.) | Corps pioneer leader of the III. SS-Panzerkorps | 25 January 1945 | — | — |
| 715 | Karl Pröll | Heer | Oberstleutnant | Commander of Panzergrenadier-Regiment 35 | 25 January 1945 | — | — |
| 716 | Hellmuth Böhlke | Heer | Generalleutnant | Commander of the 334. Infanterie-Division | 25 January 1945 | — | — |
| 717 | Walter Süß | Heer | Oberfeldwebel | Zugführer (platoon leader) in the Stabskompanie/Grenadier-Regiment 273 | 25 January 1945 | — | — |
| 718 | Wilhelm Spindler | Heer | Major | Leader of Gebirgsjäger-Regiment 99 | 31 January 1945 | At the same time promoted to Oberstleutnant | — |
| 719 | Karl Arndt | Heer | Generalleutnant | Commander of the 359. Infanterie-Division | 1 February 1945 | — | — |
| 720 | Kurt Wahl | Waffen-SS | SS-Sturmbannführer | Commander of the SS-Panzer-Aufklärungs-Abteilung 17 "Götz von Berlichingen" (Note: According to Scherzer as Commander of the SS-Panzer-Aufklärungs-Abteilung 17.) | 1 February 1945 | — | — |
| 721 | Joachim Rumohr | Waffen-SS | SS-Brigadeführer and Generalmajor of the Waffen-SS | Commander of the 8. SS-Kavallerie-Division "Florian Geyer" | 1 February 1945 | — | A man wearing a military uniform with an Iron Cross displayed at the front of his uniform collar. |
| 722 | August Zehender | Waffen-SS | SS-Brigadeführer and Generalmajor of the Waffen-SS | Commander of the 22. SS-Freiwilligen-Kavallerie-Division "Maria Theresia" | 1 February 1945 | — | A man wearing a military uniform and peaked cap with an Iron Cross displayed at the front of his uniform collar. |
| 723 | Karl Pfeffer-Wildenbruch | Waffen-SS | SS-Obergruppenführer and General of the Police and Waffen-SS | Commanding general of the IX. SS-Gebirgskorps | 1 February 1945 | — | A man wearing a military uniform. |
| 724 | Walther Dahl | Luftwaffe | Major | Geschwaderkommodore of Jagdgeschwader 300 | 1 February 1945 | At the same time promoted to Oberstleutnant | — |
| 725 | Karl Roßmann | Luftwaffe | Major | Commander of Fallschirm-Panzer-Regiment 1 "Hermann Göring" | 1 February 1945 | — | |
| 726 | Ernst Jansa | Luftwaffe | Oberst | Commander of Flak-Sturm-Regiment 12 (Note: According to Scherzer as commander of Flak-Regiment (motorized) 12.) | 1 February 1945 | — | — |
| 727 | Jürgen Harder | Luftwaffe | Major | Geschwaderkommodore of Jagdgeschwader 11 | 1 February 1945 | — | — |
| 728 | Otto Vincon | Heer | Major of the Reserves | Commander of the I./Grenadier-Regiment 460 | 5 February 1945 | — | — |
| 729 | Joachim Sander | Heer | Oberst | Commander of Panzer-Regiment 31 | 5 February 1945* | Killed in action 3 November 1944 | — |
| 730 | Georg Graf von Plettenberg | Heer | Rittmeister | Commander of schwere Kavallerie-Abteilung 4 | 5 February 1945 | — | — |
| 731 | Maximilian von Weichs | Heer | Generalfeldmarschall | OB Südost (Commander-in-chief Heeresgruppe F) | 5 February 1945 | — | A man wearing a military uniform and glasses with an Iron Cross displayed at the front of his uniform collar. |
| 732 | Wilhelm Osterhold | Heer | Oberstleutnant | Commander of Grenadier-Regiment 48 | 10 February 1945 | — | — |
| 733 | Georg Jauer | Heer | Generalleutnant | Commander of the 20. Panzergrenadier-Division | 10 February 1945 | — | — |
| 734 | Karl-Heinz Oesterwitz | Heer | Oberstleutnant | Commander of Jäger-Regiment 2 "Brandenburg" | 10 February 1945 | — | — |
| 735 | Herbert Wittmann | Luftwaffe | Major | Gruppenkommandeur of the II./Kampfgeschwader 53 "Legion Condor" | 11 February 1945 | — | — |
| 736 | Herbert Schramm | Luftwaffe | Oberleutnant | Staffelkapitän of the 5./Jagdgeschwader 27 | 11 February 1945* | Killed in action 1 December 1943 | — |
| 737 | Anton-Otto Frank | Heer | Hauptmann | Commander of Heeres-Panzer-Jäger-Abteilung 743 | 7 February 1945 | — | — |
| 738 | Anton Müller | Heer | Hauptmann | Commander of the II./Grenadier-Regiment 503 | 14 February 1945 | — | — |
| 739 | Eduard Zorn | Heer | Oberst im Generalstab (in the general staff) | Leader of the 189. Infanterie-Division | 16 February 1945* | Killed in action 4 February 1945 | — |
| 740 | Willi Schülke | Heer | Hauptmann | Commander of the III./Ski-Jäger-Regiment 1 | 16 February 1945 | — | — |
| 741 | Günther Blumentritt | Heer | General der Infanterie | Acting commander (leader) of the 25. Armee | 18 February 1945 | — | — |
| 742 | Josef Heichele | Heer | Major | Commander of Divisions-Füsilier-Bataillon 129 | 17 February 1945 | — | — |
| 743 | Georg Gebhardt | Heer | Oberstleutnant of the Reserves | Commander of Sturm-Regiment 195 | 19 February 1945 | — | — |
| 744 | Ernst Knebel | Heer | Oberst | Commander of the Armee-Waffenschule 3. Panzerarmee (AOK 3) | 19 February 1945 | — | — |
| 745 | Fritz Klasing | Heer | Oberst of the Reserves | Commander of Grenadier-Regiment 232 | 19 February 1945 | — | — |
| 746 | Edmund Blaurock | Heer | Generalmajor | Commander of the 56. Infanterie-Division | 19 February 1945 | — | — |
| 747 | Ludwig Schulz | Luftwaffe | Generalmajor | Commander of a Kampfgruppe in the Luftkriegsschule 5 (Note: According to Scherzer as commander of the Luftkriegsschule 5 Breslau and leader of a Kampfgruppe of the Luftkriegsschule 5 in the fortress Breslau.) | 19 February 1945 | — | — |
| 748 | Rolf Hermichen | Luftwaffe | Major | Gruppenkommandeur of the I./Jagdgeschwader 11 | 19 February 1945 | — | — |
| 749 | Hans Krebs | Heer | General der Infanterie | Chief of the Generalstab of Heeresgruppe B | 20 February 1945 | — | A man wearing a military uniform and peaked cap with an Iron Cross displayed at the front of his uniform collar. |
| 750 | Heinz-Martin Ewert | Heer | Major | Abschnitts-Kommandant (sector commander) West/Festung Posen | 22 February 1945 | — | — |
| 751 | Fritz-Georg von Rappard | Heer | Generalleutnant | Commander of the 7. Infanterie-Division | 24 February 1945 | — | — |
| 752 | Josef Jakwert | Heer | Leutnant | Zugführer (platoon leader) in the 2./Panzer-Jäger-Abteilung 1562 | 24 February 1945 | — | — |
| 753 | Horst Warschnauer | Heer | Hauptmann of the Reserves (Note: According to Scherzer as Hauptmann and not as Hauptmann of the Reserves.) | Commander of Panzer-Pionier-Bataillon "Großdeutschland" | 24 February 1945 | — | — |
| 754 | Hans-Babo von Rohr | Heer | Leutnant (Note: According to Scherzer as Leutnant of the Reserves.) | Leader of the 2./Panzer-Regiment 25 | 24 February 1945* | Died of wounds 15 February 1945 | |
| 755 | Ernst-August Krag | Waffen-SS | SS-Sturmbannführer | Commander of SS-Panzer-Aufklärungs-Abteilung 2 "Das Reich" | 28 February 1945 | — | — |
| 756 | Heinrich Schmelzer | Waffen-SS | SS-Hauptsturmführer of the Reserves | Chief of the 1./SS-Panzer-Pionier-Bataillon 2 "Das Reich" (Note: According to Scherzer as chief of the 1./SS-Panzer-Pionier-Bataillon 2.) | 28 February 1945 | — | — |
| 757 | Traugott Kempas | Heer | Hauptmann | Commander of the I./Grenadier-Regiment 176 | 28 February 1945 | — | — |
| 758 | Arthur Kullmer | Heer | Generalleutnant | Commander of the 558. Volksgrenadier-Division | 28 February 1945 | — | — |
| 759 | Michael Pössinger | Heer | Major | Commander of the I./Grenadier-Regiment 1123 | 28 February 1945 | — | — |
| 760 | Othmar Pollmann | Heer | Major | Adjutant of the 45. Infanterie-Division (Note: According to Scherzer as leader of Grenadier-Regiment 279 and IIa (1st Adjutant—personnel administration for officers) of the 95. Infanterie-Division.) | 28 February 1945 | — | — |
| 761 | Bern von Baer | Heer | Oberstleutnant im Generalstab | Chief of Stab/Fallschirmjäger-Panzerkorps "Hermann Göring" | 28 February 1945 | — | A man wearing a military uniform and field cap with an Iron Cross displayed at the front of his uniform collar. |
| 762 | Hans Reichardt | Heer | Oberst | Commander of Kampfgruppe "Steinau" in the 408. Infanterie-Division (Note: According to Scherzer as commander of Kampfgruppe "Steinau" in the Division-Nummer 408.) | 5 March 1945* | Killed in action 2 February 1945 | — |
| 763 | Werner Ebeling | Heer | Oberstleutnant | Commander of Grenadier-Regiment 154 | 5 March 1945 | — | — |
| 764 | Hermann Niehoff+ | Heer | Generalleutnant | Commander of the 371. Infanterie-Division | 5 March 1945 | Awarded (147th) Swords 26 April 1945? (Note: No evidence of the award can be found in the German Federal Archives. The Association of Knight's Cross Recipients (AKCR) only assumes that the Swords were awarded. According to Niehoff's testimony he was nominated by Gauleiter Karl Hanke. The date and sequential number "147" were assigned by the AKCR. Niehoff was a member of the AKCR.) | — |
| 765 | Heinrich Götz | Heer | Generalmajor | Commander of the 21. Infanterie-Division | 5 March 1945 | — | — |
| 766 | Rudolf von Bünau | Heer | General der Infanterie | Commanding general of the XI. Armeekorps | 5 March 1945 | — | — |
| 767 | Bruno Karczewski | Heer | Major | Leader of Grenadier-Regiment 176 | 5 March 1945 | — | — |
| 768 | Dipl.-Ing. Erich Schneider | Heer | Generalleutnant | Commander of the 14. Infanterie-Division | 6 March 1945 | — | — |
| 769 | Kurt Welter | Luftwaffe | Oberleutnant | Staffelkapitän of the 10./Nachtjagdgeschwader 11 | 11 March 1945 | — | — |
| 770 | Helmut Renschler | Heer | Hauptmann of the Reserves | Chief of the 1./Artillerie-Regiment 5 | 11 March 1945 | — | — |
| 771 | Dr. jur. Wolfgang Rust | Heer | Hauptmann | Commander of the II./Grenadier-Regiment 11 | 11 March 1945 | — | — |
| 772 | Friedrich Sixt | Heer | Generalleutnant | Commander of the 5. Jäger-Division | 11 March 1945 | — | — |
| 773 | Kurt Witschel | Heer | Oberleutnant | Leader of the 9./Jäger-Regiment 28 | 11 March 1945 | — | — |
| 774 | Clemens Betzel | Heer | Generalleutnant | Commander of the 4. Panzer-Division | 11 March 1945 | — | — |
| 775 | Franz Rogalski | Heer | Leutnant of the Reserves | Adjutant of the II./Grenadier-Regiment 45 | 11 March 1945 | — | — |
| 776 | Johannes Grimminger | Heer | Major of the Reserves | Commander of the II./Panzergrenadier-Regiment 192 | 11 March 1945 | — | — |
| 777 | Ernst Kutschkau | Heer | Oberfeldwebel of the Reserves | Leader of the 6./Grenadier-Regiment 3 | 11 March 1945 | — | — |
| 778 | Egon Aghta | Heer | Hauptmann (W) of the Reserves | Leader of a bomb disposal commando in the Luftgaukommando III Berlin | 12 March 1945 | — | — |
| 779 | Wilhelm Schröder | Heer | Oberst | Commander of Kampfgruppe Schröder of the 408. Infanterie-Division (Note: According to Scherzer as commander of Kampfgruppe Schröder of the Division-Nummer 408.) | 13 March 1945 | — | — |
| 780 | Karl-Heinz Becker | Luftwaffe | Oberstleutnant | Commander of Fallschirmjäger-Regiment 5 | 12 March 1945 | — | A man wearing a military uniform with an Iron Cross displayed at the front of his uniform collar. |
| 781 | Heinz Rökker | Luftwaffe | Hauptmann | Staffelkapitän of the 2./Nachtjagdgeschwader 2 | 12 March 1945 | — | — |
| 782 | Robert Weiß | Luftwaffe | Hauptmann | Gruppenkommandeur of the III./Jagdgeschwader 54 | 12 March 1945* | Killed in action 29 December 1944 | |
| 783 | Werner Pötschke | Waffen-SS | SS-Sturmbannführer | Commander of the I./SS-Panzer-Regiment 1 "Leibstandarte SS Adolf Hitler" | 15 March 1945 | — | — |
| 784 | Alfred Matern | Heer | Oberfeldwebel | Zugführer (platoon leader) in the 5./Füsilier-Regiment 22 | 16 March 1945 | — | — |
| 785 | Fritz Vogt | Waffen-SS | SS-Hauptsturmführer | Commander of the I./SS-Panzergrenadier-Regiment 23 "Norge" (norw. Nr. 1) | 16 March 1945 | — | — |
| 786 | Karl-Heinz Jaeger | Heer | Hauptmann of the Reserves | Leader of Grenadier-Regiment 448 | 16 March 1945 | — | — |
| 787 | Max Wandrey | Heer | Major of the Reserves | Commander of the II./Jäger-Regiment 1 "Brandenburg" | 16 March 1945* | Died of wounds on 21 February 1945 | — |
| 788 | Hans Engelien | Heer | Oberstleutnant | Commander of Panzergrenadier-Regiment 25 | 16 March 1945 | — | — |
| 789 | Heinrich Ruhl | Heer | Major | Commander of Füsilier-Bataillon (A.A.) 122 | 16 March 1945 | — | — |
| 790 | Bruno Frankewitz | Heer | Generalleutnant | Commander of the 215. Infanterie-Division | 16 March 1945 | — | — |
| 791 | Paul Scheuerpflug | Heer | Generalleutnant | Commander of the 68. Infanterie-Division | 16 March 1945 | — | — |
| 792 | Martin Becker | Luftwaffe | Hauptmann (Note: According to Scherzer as Hauptmann of the Reserves.) | Gruppenkommandeur of the IV./Nachtjagdgeschwader 6 | 20 March 1945 | — | — |
| 793 | Gerhard Werner | Heer | Major | Commander of the I./Jäger-Regiment 734 | 23 March 1945* | Killed in action 8 September 1944 | — |
| 794 | Ernst-Georg Kedzia | Heer | Major | Combat commander of Fürstenberg an der Oder and commander of Grenadier-Regiment 98 (391. Sicherungs-Division) (Note: According to Scherzer as combat commander of Fürstenberg an der Oder and commander of Grenadier-Regiment 98 (Divisions-Stab z.b.V. 391).) | 23 March 1945 | — | — |
| 795 | Kuno von Meyer | Heer | Oberstleutnant | Commander of Panzer-Regiment "Coburg" in the Panzer-Brigade 103 | 23 March 1945 | — | — |
| 796 | Walter Prüß | Heer | Oberleutnant | Chief of the 8./Panzergrenadier-Regiment 76 | 23 March 1945 | — | — |
| 797 | Günther Konopacki | Heer | Rittmeister | Commander of the I./Radfahr-Jäger-Brigade 10 | 23 March 1945 | — | — |
| 798 | Hans-Georg Herzog | Heer | Oberstleutnant of the Reserves | Commander of Panzergrenadier-Regiment 14 | 23 March 1945 | — | — |
| 799 | Rudolf Trittel | Heer | Oberstleutnant | Commander of Grenadier-Regiment 9 | 23 March 1945 | — | — |
| 800 | Karl Wanka | Heer | Major of the Reserves | Commander of the I./Grenadier-Regiment 53 | 23 March 1945 | — | — |
| 801 | Harald Freiherr von Elverfeldt | Heer | Generalmajor | Commander of the 9. Panzer-Division | 23 March 1945* | Killed in action 6 March 1945 | — |
| 802 | Friedrich Jeckeln | Waffen-SS | SS-Obergruppenführer and General of the Waffen-SS | Commanding general of the V. SS-Gebirgskorps | 8 March 1945 | — | A man wearing a military uniform. |
| 803 | Fritz Fullriede | Heer | Oberst | Fortress commander of Kolberg | 23 March 1945 | — | |
| 804 | Johannes Spielmann | Heer | Major | Commander of Sturmgeschütz-Brigade 202 | 28 March 1945 | — | — |
| 805 | Heinrich Keese | Heer | Major of the Reserves | Commander of Pionier-Bataillon 20 (mot.) | 28 March 1945 | — | — |
| 806 | Lothar Berger | Heer | Oberst | Commander of Brigade z.b.V. 100 | 28 March 1945 | — | — |
| 807 | Helmuth Hufenbach | Heer | Oberst | Leader of the 562. Volksgrenadier-Division | 28 March 1945* | Killed in action 27 March 1945 | — |
| 808 | Erich Schroedter | Heer | Rittmeister | Commander of Panzer-Augklärungs-Abteilung "Großdeutschland" | 28 March 1945 | — | — |
| 809 | Horst von Usedom | Heer | Oberst | Leader of Panzer-Brigade "Kurland" | 28 March 1945 | — | — |
| 810 | Günther Josten | Luftwaffe | Oberleutnant | Staffelkapitän of the 3./Jagdgeschwader 51 "Mölders" | 28 March 1945 | — | — |
| 811 | Alexander Gläser | Luftwaffe | Hauptmann | Gruppenkommandeur of the II./Schlachtgeschwader 77 | 28 March 1945 | — | — |
| 812 | Wilhelm Stähler | Luftwaffe | Oberleutnant | Staffelkapitän of the 7./Schlachtgeschwader 2 "Immelmann" | 28 March 1945 | — | — |
| 813 | Gerhard Stüdemann | Luftwaffe | Hauptmann | Gruppenkommandeur of the III./Schlachtgeschwader 77 | 28 March 1945 | — | — |
| 814 | Walter Girg | Waffen-SS | SS-Hauptsturmführer | Leader of special detachment of the SS-Jagdverband Mitte | 1 April 1945 | — | — |
| 815 | Horst von Mellenthin | Heer | Generalleutnant | Commander of the 205. Infanterie-Division | 4 April 1945 | — | — |
| 816 | Martin Steglich | Heer | Major | Leader of Grenadier-Regiment 1221 | 5 April 1945 | — | — |
| 817 | Rudolf Neubert | Heer | Oberstleutnant | Commander of Grenadier-Regiment 31 | 5 April 1945 | — | — |
| 818 | Friedrich Richter | Heer | Oberstleutnant | Commander of Grenadier-Regiment 1222 | 5 April 1945 | — | — |
| 819 | Ernst Kuppinger | Heer | Hauptmann | Commander of Füsilier-Bataillon 246 (Note: According to Scherzer as commander of Divisions-Füsilier-Bataillon 246.) | 5 April 1945 | — | — |
| 820 | Otto Paetsch | Waffen-SS | SS-Obersturmbannführer | Commander of SS-Panzer-Regiment 10 "Frundsberg" | 5 April 1945* | Killed in action 16 March 1945 | |
| 821 | Hans von Tettau | Heer | Generalleutnant | Leader of Korpsgruppe "von Tettau" | 5 April 1945 | — | — |
| 822 | Gerhard Thyben | Luftwaffe | Oberleutnant | Staffelkapitän of the 7./Jagdgeschwader 54 | 8 April 1945 | — | A man wearing a military uniform and field cap with an Iron Cross displayed at the front of his uniform collar. |
| 823 | Theodor Burchardi | Kriegsmarine | Admiral | Commanding Admiral östliche Ostsee (Eastern Baltic Sea) | 8 April 1945 | — | A man wearing a military uniform and peaked cap with a military order in shape of a cross displayed at the front of his uniform collar. |
| 824 | August Thiele | Kriegsmarine | Vizeadmiral | Commander of Kampfgruppe "Thiele" | 8 April 1945 | — | A man wearing a military uniform with an Iron Cross displayed at the front of his uniform collar. |
| 825 | Bruno Richter | Heer | Rittmeister | Commander of Füsilier-Bataillon (A.A.) 24 | 8 April 1945 | — | — |
| 826 | Dipl.-Ing. Otto Skorzeny | Waffen-SS | SS-Obersturmbannführer of the Reserves | Commander of the SS-Jagd-Verbände and combat commander of Schwedt an der Oder | 9 April 1945 | — | A man wearing a military uniform and steel helmet with an Iron Cross displayed at the front of his uniform collar. |
| 827 | Ernst-Anton von Krosigk | Heer | General der Infanterie | Commanding of the XVI. Armeekorps | 12 April 1945* | Killed in action 16 March 1945 | — |
| 828 | Helmut Borchardt | Heer | Oberfeldwebel | Leader of the company "Borchardt" of the regiment "Kohlmann" in the 402. Infanterie-Division | 14 April 1945* | Killed in action 15–18 March 1945 (Note: According to Scherzer Helmut Borchardt was killed in action in the timeframe 15 to 18 March 1945 in the vicinity of Küstrin.) | |
| 829 | Carl Becker | Heer | Generalleutnant | Commander of the 253. Infanterie-Division | 14 April 1945 | — | — |
| 830 | Kurt Röpke | Heer | General der Infanterie | Commanding general of the XXIX. Armeekorps | 14 April 1945 | — | — |
| 831 | Friedrich Rögelein | Heer | Oberst | Commander of Grenadier-Regiment 109 | 14 April 1945 | — | — |
| 832 | Alfred Simm | Heer | Hauptmann | Leader of the II./Grenadier-Regiment 31 | 14 April 1945 | — | — |
| 833 | Gerhard Raht | Luftwaffe | Hauptmann | Gruppenkommandeur of the I./Nachtjagdgeschwader 2 | 15 April 1945 | — | — |
| 834 | Hans-Arno Ostermeier | Heer | Major of the Reserves | Leader of Fallschirm-Panzergrenadier-Regiment 3 "Hermann Göring" (Note: According to Scherzer as leader of the Assault Battalion of Fallschirm-Panzergrenadier-Regiment 3 "Hermann Göring".) | 15 April 1945 | — | — |
| 835 | Max Hansen | Waffen-SS | SS-Obersturmbannführer | Commander of SS-Panzergrenadier-Regiment 1 "Leibstandarte SS Adolf Hitler" | 17 April 1945 | — | A man wearing a military uniform and peaked cap with an Iron Cross displayed at the front of his uniform collar. |
| 836 | Herbert Lütje | Luftwaffe | Major | Geschwaderkommodore of Nachtjagdgeschwader 6 | 17 April 1945 | — | |
| 837 | Helmut Lipfert | Luftwaffe | Hauptmann | Gruppenkommandeur of the I./Jagdgeschwader 53 | 17 April 1945 | — | — |
| 838 | Josef Kraft | Luftwaffe | Hauptmann | Staffelkapitän of the 12./Nachtjagdgeschwader 1 | 17 April 1945 | — | — |
| 839 | Martin Drewes | Luftwaffe | Major | Gruppenkommandeur of the III./Nachtjagdgeschwader 1 | 17 April 1945 | — | |
| 840 | Hermann Greiner | Luftwaffe | Hauptmann | Gruppenkommandeur of the IV./Nachtjagdgeschwader 1 | 17 April 1945 | — | — |
| 841 | Paul Semrau | Luftwaffe | Major | Gruppenkommandeur of the I./Nachtjagdgeschwader 2 | 17 April 1945* | Killed in action 8 February 1945 | A man wearing a military uniform with an Iron Cross displayed at the front of his uniform collar. |
| 842 | Adolf Raegener | Heer | Generalleutnant | Commander of Verteidigungsbereich Magdeburg (defensive sector of Magdeburg) | 17 April 1945 | — | — |
| 843 | Hans-Peter Knaust | Heer | Oberstleutnant | Commander of Regiment "Knaust" in the 490. Infanterie-Division (Note: According to Scherzer as commander of Regiment "Knaust" (Divisions Nr. 490).) | 17 April 1945 | — | |
Last officially announced number
| (844) | Franz Hack? (Note: The recommendation for Franz Hack's Oak Leaves to the Knight's Cross was submitted to the Heerespersonalamt (HPA—Army Staff Office) by the Division sometime between 16 and 19 April 1945 and approved by the commander of the IV. SS-Korps Herbert Otto Gille. Missing is the approval from the 6. Armee and Heeresgruppe Süd. There is no indication whether the recommendation was approved. The response from the Reichsführer-SS was prepared but missing is a date and signature. The existing card is not contemporary. There is no indication in the press that the award was presented. According to Fellgiebel Hack received the Oak Leaves from SS-Obergruppenführer and General of the SS Herbert-Otto Gille, commanding general IV. SS-Panzerkorps. The sequential number "844" and date of award were assigned by the Association of Knight's Cross Recipients (AKCR).) | Waffen-SS | SS-Obersturmbannführer | Commander of SS-Panzergrenadier-Regiment 10 "Westland" | 18 April 1945 | — | — |
| (845) | Paul-Albert Kausch? (Note: No evidence of the award can be found in the German Federal Archives. Fellgiebel claimed that Paul-Albert Kausch, at the time wounded in the Reich Chancellery, had received news that according to a radio message received from Panzer AOK 11 had been awarded the Oak Leaves on 23 April 1945 from SS-Brigadeführer Joachim Ziegler. Kausch's division commander Ziegler was killed in action on 1 May 1945. Ernst-Günther Krätschmer, however, indicated that Kausch was wounded on 25 April and as such he therefore could not have received the news that day. The 11th SS Volunteer Panzergrenadier Division Nordland was only subordinated to the 11th Panzer Armee in February 1945. The Stab of the 11th Panzer Army then relocated to the Western Front where it surrendered on 21 April. Krätschmer claimed that the award was presented for the actions during the middle of April east of Berlin. Mr. J.S. Fischer, who was verifying the Oak Leaves presentation on behalf of Fellgiebel, is not aware of a radio message received from the Panzer AOK 11. Fischer indicated that he only referenced the information presented by Kausch, which is already stated in Krätschmer. According to information by Fischer on 14 October 2004, Fellgiebel had made the note about the Panzer AOK 11. The sequential number "845" was assigned by the Association of Knight's Cross Recipients (AKCR)—according to Krätschmer the number is "846"—the date was accepted by the AKCR. Kausch was a member of the AKCR.) | Waffen-SS | SS-Obersturmbannführer | Commander of SS-Panzer-Regiment 11 | 23 April 1945 | — | — |
| (846) | Josef Brandner? (Note: No evidence of the award can be found in the German Federal Archives. According to Josef Brandner's own account he received the Oak Leaves from the commanding general of the XXXVIII. Armeekorps, General der Artillerie Kurt Herzog in the Courland Pocket. He did not mention a date for the presentation. Presumably pictures showing him with Oak Leaves exist. The Association of Knight's Cross Recipients (AKCR) assumes a direct presentation from Berlin. The presentation date is also an assumption by the AKCR. A presentation of the Oak Leaves only four to five weeks after the Knight's Cross of the Iron Cross is very unlikely. The German Federal Archives holds numerous records of nominations which have been rejected on the grounds that a high-ranking military award had just been presented. Brandner was a member of the AKCR.) | Heer | Major | Commander of Heeres-Sturmgeschütz-Brigade 912 | 26 April 1945 | — | — |
| (847) | Eberhard Rodt | Heer | Generalleutnant | Commander of the 15. Panzergrenadier-Division | 28 April 1945 | — | — |
| (848) | Joachim Ziegler | Waffen-SS | SS-Brigadeführer and Generalmajor of the Waffen-SS | Commander of the 11. SS-Freiwilligen-Panzergrenadier Division "Nordland" (Note: According to Scherzer at the same time commander of defensive sector C (south east) in Berlin.) | 28 April 1945 | — | — |
| (849) | Hans-Joachim Kappis | Heer | Oberleutnant of the Reserves | Leader of the II./Grenadier-Regiment 45 | 28 April 1945 | — | — |
| (850) | Karl Schrepfer | Luftwaffe | Major | Gruppenkommandeur of the III./Schlachtgeschwader 1 | 28 April 1945 | — | — |
| (851) | Josef Prentl | Luftwaffe | Major | Commander of Flak-Regiment 116 | 28 April 1945 | — | — |
| (852) | Rolf Thomsen | Kriegsmarine | Kapitänleutnant | Commander of U-1202 | 29 April 1945 | — | — |
| (853) | Hans-Günther Lange | Kriegsmarine | Kapitänleutnant | Commander of U-711 | 29 April 1945 | — | — |
| (854) | Heinz-Oskar Laebe? (Note: Heinz-Oskar Laebe's nomination was prepared for signature by the Heerespersonalamt (HPA—Army Staff Office) by the end of the war. According to the Association of Knight's Cross Recipients (AKCR) the award was presented in accordance with the Dönitz-decree. This is illegal according to the Deutsche Dienststelle (WASt) and lacks legal justification. The presentation date is an assumption of the AKCR. Laebe was a member of the AKCR.) | Heer | Oberst | Commander of Grenadier-Regiment 44 | 29 April 1945 | — | — |
| (855) | Heinrich Hax | Heer | Generalmajor | Commander of the 8. Panzer-Division | 30 April 1945 | — | — |
| (856) | Hanns Laengenfelder | Heer | Generalmajor | Commander of the 15. Infanterie-Division | 30 April 1945 | — | — |
| (857) | Richard Daniel | Heer | Generalmajor | Commander of the 45. Volksgrenadier-Division | 30 April 1945 | — | — |
| (858) | Wolfgang von Obstfelder | Heer | Major | Commander of Panzer-Jäger-Abteilung 346 | 30 April 1945 | — | — |
| (859) | Wolfgang von Bostell | Heer | Leutnant | Zugführer (platoon leader) in the Panzerjäger-Abteilung 205 (Note: According to Scherzer as leader of the 2./Panzerjäger-Abteilung 205.) | 30 April 1945 | — | — |
| (860) | Gerhard Mokros | Heer | Oberst of the Reserves (Note: According to Scherzer as Oberstleutnant of the Reserves.) | Commander of Grenadier-Regiment 423 | 5 May 1945 | — | — |
| (861) | Werner Ostendorff? (Note: No evidence of the award to Werner Ostendorff can be found in the German Federal Archives. The award was unlawfully presented by SS-Oberstgruppenführer Sepp Dietrich. The date is taken from the announcement made by the 6. SS-Panzerarmee. The sequential number "861" was assigned by the Association of Knight's Cross Recipients (AKCR).) | Waffen-SS | SS-Gruppenführer and Generalleutnant of the Waffen-SS | Commander of the 2. SS-Panzer-Division "Das Reich" | 6 May 1945* | Died of wounds 1 May 1945 | A man wearing a military uniform and peaked cap with an Iron Cross displayed at the front of his uniform collar. |
| (862) | Rudolf Lehmann? (Note: No evidence of the award can be found in the German Federal Archives. The award was unlawfully presented by SS-Oberstgruppenführer Sepp Dietrich. The date is taken from the announcement made by the 6. SS-Panzerarmee. The sequential number "862" was assigned by the Association of Knight's Cross Recipients (AKCR). Lehmann was a member of the AKCR.) | Waffen-SS | SS-Standartenführer | Leader of the 2. SS-Panzer-Division "Das Reich" | 6 May 1945 | — | — |
| (863) | Karl Kreutz? (Note: No evidence of the award can be found in the German Federal Archives. The award was unlawfully presented by SS-Oberstgruppenführer Sepp Dietrich. The date is taken from the announcement made by the 6. SS-Panzerarmee. The sequential number "863" was assigned by the Association of Knight's Cross Recipients (AKCR). Karl Kreutz was a member of the AKCR.) | Waffen-SS | SS-Standartenführer | Commander of SS-Panzer-Artillerie-Regiment 2 "Das Reich" | 6 May 1945 | — | — |
| (864) | Heinz Werner (Waffen-SS)? (Note: No evidence of the award can be found in the German Federal Archives. The award was unlawfully presented by SS-Oberstgruppenführer Sepp Dietrich. The date is taken from the announcement made by the 6. SS-Panzerarmee. The sequential number "864" was assigned by the Association of Knight's Cross Recipients (AKCR). Werner was a member of the AKCR.) | Waffen-SS | SS-Sturmbannführer | Commander of the III./SS-Panzergrenadier-Regiment 4 "Der Führer" | 6 May 1945 | — | — |
| (865) | Alfred Jodl? (Note: The award was unlawfully presented on 10 May 1945. The sequential number "865" was assigned by the Association of Knight's Cross Recipients (AKCR).) | Heer | Generaloberst | Chef des Wehrmachtführungsstabes im OKW and deputy chief of the OKW | 10 May 1945 | — | A man wearing a military uniform and peaked cap. |
| (866) | Adalbert von Blanc? (Note: There is no reference that the Oak Leaves were awarded to Adalbert von Blanc in the German Federal Archives. His personal file contains a letter from Admiral August Thiele indicating that von Blanc had been recommended for the Oak Leaves by Thiele. In a file of the German Minenräumdienst dated just after the capitulation is an entry "Knight's Cross of the Iron Cross with Oak Leaves" without indicating a date of the award. The sequential number "866" and date were assigned by the Association of Knight's Cross Recipients (AKCR). Von Blanc was a member of the AKCR.) | Kriegsmarine | Fregattenkapitän | Leader of the 9. Marine-Sicherungs-Division | 10 May 1945 | — | |
| (867) | Hermann Plocher? (Note: Hermann Plocher's nomination had been finalized by the Heerespersonalamt (HPA—Army Staff Office) and was ready for signature by the end of the war. According to the Association of Knight's Cross Recipients (AKCR) the award was presented in accordance with the Dönitz-decree. This is illegal according to the Deutsche Dienststelle (WASt) and lacks legal justification. The presentation date was assigned by Fellgiebel. Plocher was a member of the AKCR.) | Luftwaffe | Generalleutnant | Commander of the 6. Fallschirmjäger-Division | 8 May 1945 | — | — |
| (868) | Franz Graßmel? (Note: The original nomination was not retained. The Oberbefehlshaber Nordwest (OB Nordwest—Commander-in-chief North-West) had sent the nomination to the Oberkommando der Luftwaffe/Auszeichnung und Disziplin (OKL/AuD—Air Force High Command/Award and Discipline). The accompanying letter is presented by Franz Thomas, author of Die Ritterkreuzträger der Deutschen Wehrmacht 1939-1945, Teil II Die Ritterkreuzträger der Fallschirmjäger, Osnabrück 1986, page 88. No further information prevailed. A presentation cannot be verified. The Order Commission of the Association of Knight's Cross Recipients (AKCR) processed this case in 1974 and decided: 868th Oak Leaves, 8 May 1945. According to the AKCR the award was presented in accordance with the Dönitz-decree. This is illegal according to the Deutsche Dienststelle (WASt) and lacks legal justification. The sequential number "868" and date were assigned by the AKCR. Franz Graßmel is listed by the OB Nordwest for the "Nomination for the presentation of war awards" in May 1945. This list, which was to be presented to Karl Dönitz, holds 12 names. These nominations had all been submitted by the OB Nordwest via the command chain and must be considered not finalized. Dönitz has never signed this list and most likely has never seen this list. Graßmel was a member of the AKCR.) | Luftwaffe | Major | Commander of the Fallschirmjäger-Regiment 20 | 8 May 1945 | — | — |
| (869) | Friedrich Lier? (Note: The OB Nordwest (Commander-in-chief North-West) submitted five approved nominations to the Führungsstab "A" (OKW/WFSt—Oberkommando der Wehrmacht/Wehrmacht-Führungsstab—leadership staff of the Army High Command) on 2 May 1945. Four of these nominations were submitted via teleprinter, these were Friedrich Anding, Heinz Lotze, (Johann-)Nepomuk Stützle and Gustav Walle, and Friedrich Lier's nomination for the Oak Leaves via messenger. The reason for why not all five nominations had been submitted via teleprinter is that Anding had destroyed six or more enemy tanks in close combat. The prerequisites of Führeranordnung (Führer decree) of 7 March 1945 had therefore been met and no further explanation or details were needed. Scherzer assumes that this must have been different in Lier's case and more details describing his actions including drawings had been created. This type of nomination was difficult to submit via teleprinter and a messenger was sent. This nomination was never received by the Heerespersonalamt (HPA—Army Staff Office). Lier is not listed on the list of awarded Knight's Crosses, which in some cases was also used as a nomination entry list, the other four nominations are listed. Also missing is the original nomination, the teleprinters on the other hand have prevailed. A nomination, which was never received, cannot be judged. A presentation cannot be proven. The Order Commission of the Association of Knight's Cross Recipients (AKCR) processed this case in 1975 on behalf of a relative of Lier and decided: 869th Oak Leaves yes, 8 May 1945. The sequential number and date were assigned by the AKCR. Lier was a member of the AKCR. Lier never received news about the Oak Leaves presentation before he died on 18 August 1974.) | Heer | Oberstleutnant | Commander of a Kampfgruppe in the 490. Infanterie-Division | 8 May 1945 | — | — |
| (870) | Oskar-Hubert Dennhardt? (Note: Major Joachim Domaschk, who processed the nomination at the Heerespersonalamt (HPA—Army Staff Office) from the troop, had sent a message to the AOK Ostpreußen on 28 March 1945 requesting an approval from the Armeekorps and the Armee. This approval was never received before the end of hostilities. Oskar-Hubert Dennhardt is not listed in the book for the "nominations for the higher grades of the Knight's Cross of the Iron Cross" nor in the nomination book for Knight's Cross (starting with Nr. 5100). According to the Association of Knight's Cross Recipients (AKCR) the award was presented in accordance with the Dönitz-decree. This is illegal according to the Deutsche Dienststelle (WASt) and lacks legal justification. The sequential number "870" and the presentation date were assigned by the AKCR. Dennhardt was a member of the AKCR.) | Heer | Major | Leader of Grenadier-Regiment 1143 | 9 May 1945 | — | — |
| (871) | Matthias Kleinheisterkamp? (Note: Fellgiebel claims that the nomination was received by the Heerespersonalamt (HPA—Army Staff Office) via teleprinter from the commander-in-chief of the 9. Armee, general Theodor Busse, on 21 April 1945. Busse had nominated SS-Obergruppenführer Kleinheisterkamp for the Oak Leaves. The claim is that the teleprinter message contained a note that the formal procedure for immediate approval should be waited for (Dienstwegvorschlag bzgl. Sofortverleihung abwarten). This teleprinter message cannot be found in the German Nation Archives (Bestand RH 7). Busse had also nominated by teleprint Generalmajor Joachim von Siegroth on 21 April. This teleprinter message can be found in the Nation Archives (Bundesarchiv RH 7/300). According to Fellgiebel the same note can be found on von Siegroth's nomination. This means that a formal nomination, in this instance via the Army Group Vistula, followed. Both announced "formal nominations" never followed and were never received by the HPA. The teleprinter nomination of von Siegroth is listed in the book of "Verliehene Ritterkreuze" (Awarded Knight Crosses) with an entry date of 21 April but Kleinheisterkamp's nomination is not. The reason for this may be that the liaison officer of the Waffen-SS at the HPA/P5a may have forwarded the nomination to the Reichsführer-SS for approval. From here it should have been returned to the HPA which it was not. The distribution list of von Siegroth's nomination indicates that general Busse had informed the Army Group Vistula and the chief of the HPA general Wilhelm Burgdorf. It is very likely that Kleinheisterkamp's nomination had the same distribution list as von Siegroth's, because the same principles applied. Burgdorf therefore should have been informed of the formal procedure regarding Kleinheisterkamp's nomination. The question remains unanswered whether the Führer Headquarter or Adolf Hitler has approved the direct nomination of Kleinheisterkamp on 28 April or not. Scherzer claims that this is very unlikely because Burgdorf would not have done two things. First, submit a nomination to the Führer without having assessed the situation himself, which only would have been possible if he had studied the formal paperwork. Secondly he would not have bypassed the formal procedure which was already initiated. Additionally the radio connection to the Führerbunker was down since 5:00 on 28 April 1945. The sequential number "871" was assigned by the Association of Knight's Cross Recipients (AKCR) and the date is assumed.) | Waffen-SS | SS-Obergruppenführer and Generalleutnant of the Waffen-SS | Commanding general of the XI. SS-Panzerkorps | 9 May 1945* | Killed in action 29 April 1945 (Note: According to Fellgiebel on 2 May 1945 in the Battle of Halbe.) | |
| (872) | Hanns-Heinrich Lohmann? (Note: The nomination was received by the Heerespersonalamt (HPA—Army Staff Office) from the troop on 25 March 1945 and was approved by the commanding general of the III. (germ.) SS-Panzerkorps. Missing is the approval from the commander-in-chief of the 11. Armee, Army Group Vistula and from the Reichsführer-SS. The HPA created a formal nomination without a sequential number on 27 March 1945. Both nominations are retained in the Nation Archives. Both nominations give no information whether the nomination was approved and whether the Oak Leaves had been awarded. The nomination list of the higher grade of the Knight's Cross of the Iron Cross with Oak Leaves only dates the nomination entry on 25 March 1945. The Order Commission of the Association of Knight's Cross Recipients (AKCR) processed this case in 1974 and decided: yes, 872nd Oak Leaves. According to the AKCR the award was presented in accordance with the Dönitz-decree. This is illegal according to the Deutsche Dienststelle (WASt) and lacks legal justification. The sequential number "872" and date were assigned by the AKCR. Lohmann was a member of the AKCR.) | Waffen-SS | SS-Obersturmbannführer | Leader of SS-Freiwilligen-Panzergrenadier-Regiment 49 "De Ruyter" | 9 May 1945 | — | — |
| (873) | Alfred Montag? (Note: The nomination was received by the Heerespersonalamt (HPA—Army Staff Office) from the troop on 28 April 1945 and approved by the Corps and by the OB West. Missing is a statement by the Army and by the Army Group (Heeresruppe). Major Joachim Domaschk decided "Oak Leaves yes" but deferred. Heeresgruppe B—the Sturmgeschütz-Brigade had already surrendered together with the Heeresgruppe B in the Ruhr Pocket. The nomination was therefore left unfinished according to AHA 44 Ziff. 572. The nomination list of the higher grade of the Knight's Cross of the Iron Cross with Oak Leaves confirms the entry of 28 March 1945. Noted here is a comment indicating "deferred". A formal presentation has not happened. The sequential number "868" was assigned by the Association of Knight's Cross Recipients (AKCR). The presentation date was assigned by Fellgiebel. Alfred Montag was a member of the AKCR.) | Heer | Hauptmann of the Reserves | Leader of Sturmgeschütz-Brigade 341 | 9 May 1945 | — | — |
| (874) | Hans Meier? (Note: Hans Meier's nomination for the Oak Leaves was received by the Heerespersonalamt (HPA—Army Staff Office) from the troop on 12 April 1945 and approved by all intermittent commanding officers. No further comments or indications of approval have been noted and left unfinished by the end of the war. A non contemporary file card notes an entry date 17 March 1945 which could be the nomination date of the troop. The nomination list for the higher grades of Knight's Cross of the Iron Cross indicates an entry date 12 April 1945, no further date is listed. A comment states: "Unfinished". According to the Association of Knight's Cross Recipients (AKCR) the award was presented in accordance with the Dönitz-decree. This is illegal according to the Deutsche Dienststelle (WASt) and lacks legal justification. The sequential number "874" was assigned by the AKCR, the presentation date by Fellgiebel.) | Heer | Hauptmann | Commander of the I./Panzergrenadier-Regiment 74 | 9 May 1945 | — | — |
| (875) | Alfons Rebane? (Note: Alfons Rebane's nomination was submitted to the Heerespersonalamt (HPA—Army Staff Office) on 12 April 1945. The German Federal Archives only hold a copy of the nomination. There is no indication or remark that the nomination was processed. The nomination list for the higher grade of the Knight's Cross with Oak Leaves dates the nomination on 2 April 1945. This list also gives no indication that the nomination had been processed. The Order Commission of the Association of Knight's Cross Recipients (AKCR) processed this case in 1974 and decided: 875th Oak Leaves on 8 May 1945. The sequential number "875" was assigned by the AKCR, the date was later changed by Fellgiebel to 9 May 1945. Rebane was a member of the AKCR.) | Waffen-SS | Waffen-Obersturmbannführer | Commander of Waffen-Grenadier-Regiment der Waffen-SS 46 (estnische Nr. 2) | 9 May 1945 | — | |
| (876) | Walter Schlags-Koch? (Note: The Heerespersonalamt (HPA—Army Staff Office) received Walter Schlags-Koch's nomination via wireless communication on 6 April 1945. Major Joachim Domaschk requested via wireless communication the advisory opinion of the 2. Armee. Presumably this statement was not received yet on 28 April because Domaschk decided to postpone the decision and ordered the re-presentation for 8 May, which was never processed. The entry date for the wireless nomination of 6 April 1945 is noted on the nomination list of the higher grade of the Knight's Cross of the Iron Cross with Oak Leaves. However no other date is listed, the section comments states "unprocessed". The Order Commission of the Association of Knight's Cross Recipients (AKCR) processed this case in 1973 and decided: "877 Oak Leaves". Scherzer claims that this decision was not approved by Gerhard von Seemann—author of various publications regarding the Knight's Cross of the Iron Cross—since Schlags-Koch is not listed as an Oak Leaves recipient in his book Die Ritterkreuzträger 1939–1945 (2nd edition from 1976). The presentation number was later changed by Walther-Peer Fellgiebel to "876". However, Schlags-Koch is listed by Von Seemen as the 876th Oak Leaves recipient. The presentation date was assigned by Fellgiebel. Schlags-Koch was a member of the AKCR.) | Heer | Oberstleutnant of the Reserves | Commander of Sturm-Regiment AOK 2 | 9 May 1945 | — | — |
| (877) | Erich Schmidt? (Note: The Heerespersonalamt (HPA—Army Staff Office) received Erich Schmidt's nomination on 24 March 1945. Major Joachim Domaschk noted three days later: "Insufficient for the Oak Leaves!". Nevertheless an HAP entry nomination without nomination number was created on 29 March and presented to General Wilhelm Burgdorf. Burgdorf noted on 31 March: "Request advisory opinion from the commanding general!" and returned the nomination to the HPA. Major Domaschk requested via teleprinter the statement of the XXXIX. Panzerkorps. The Panzerkorps answered on 5 April via teleprinter that they are not responsible since the respective division was only subordinated to the corps for a very short time and never in action. Domaschk then requested the advisory opinion from the LVII. Panzerkorps on 8 April, which was not received by 28 April. On this day Domaschk noted "Wait" and ordered the re-presentation for 5 May. The nomination remained unprocessed after this date. The nomination list of the higher grade of the Knight's Cross of the Iron Cross with Oak Leaves notes the entry date of 24 March and that the nomination was forwarded to General Burgdorf on 29 March 1945. A presentation date is not stated and a comment says "further enquiry". The Order Commission of the Association of Knight's Cross Recipients (AKCR) processed this case in 1982 and decided: "Oak Leaves yes, 9 May 1945". It appears that the AKCR had questioned a witness, the former adjutant of the Army to the Commander-in-chief of the Wehrmacht Willy Johannmeyer, he wrote to the AKCR on 29 March 1968: "By all means, I cannot remember a pick-up of the Oak Leaves for Mr Oberleutnant Erich Schmidt". The presentation number "876" was assigned by the AKCR. The presentation date was assigned by Fellgiebel. Schmidt was a member of the AKCR.) | Heer | Major | Leader of the Panzer-Regiment of the Führer-Grenadier-Division | 9 May 1945 | — | — |
| (878) | Joachim von Siegroth? (Note: The Heerespersonalamt (HPA—Army Staff Office) received Joachim von Siegroth's nomination for the Oak Leaves from the commander-in-chief of the 9. Armee Theodor Busse via teleprinter message on 21 April 1945 announcing that a detailed statement with explanations will follow. This nomination went to the chief of the HPA in Berlin and to the Army Group Vistula. Major Joachim Domaschk noted on 28 April: "Waiting for announced statement!". The nomination list of the higher grade of the Knight's Cross of the Iron Cross with Oak Leaves notes the entry date of 19 March 1945. This is the date when the nomination was sent. An almost unreadable comment states "Waiting". According to Fellgiebel a note claims "service proposal regarding immediate presentation pending". Scherzer does not confirm this entry but states that a comment "Waiting for announced statement" is noted instead. No further comments indicate that the nomination was further processed. According to the Association of Knight's Cross Recipients (AKCR) the award was presented in accordance with the Dönitz-decree. This is illegal according to the Deutsche Dienststelle (WASt) and lacks legal justification. The presentation number "876" was assigned by the AKCR. The presentation date was assigned by Fellgiebel.) | Heer | Generalmajor | Commander of the 712. Infanterie-Division | 9 May 1945* | Killed in action 2 May 1945 | |
| (879) | Dr. jur. Paul Stahl? (Note: The Heerespersonalamt (HPA—Army Staff Office) received Dr.-jur. Paul Stahl's nomination for the Oak Leaves with the approval of the II. SS-Panzerkorps via letter on 12 April 1945. The HPA then again received the nomination, this time as a teleprinter message, together with the approval of Army Group South with the comment: "Waiting for statement of the 6. Armee, will be handed in later. Supreme command Army Group South". Major Joachim Domaschk noted: "Waiting for Panzer AOK 6 statement!". No further comments regarding the presentation or work in progress have been noted. Stahl is not listed on the nomination list of the higher grade of the Knight's Cross of the Iron Cross with Oak Leaves nor in the nomination book for Knight's Cross (starting with Nr. 5100). The Order Commission of the Association of Knight's Cross Recipients (AKCR) processed this case in 1975 and decided: "879th Oak Leaves, 9 May 1945". According to the AKCR the award was presented in accordance with the Dönitz-decree. This is illegal according to the Deutsche Dienststelle (WASt) and lacks legal justification. The presentation number "879" was assigned by the AKCR. The presentation date was assigned by Fellgiebel. Stahl was a member of the AKCR.) | Heer | Oberst of the Reserves | Commander of Panzergrenadier-Regiment 114 | 9 May 1945 | — | — |
| (880) | Georg Störck? (Note: The Heerespersonalamt (HPA—Army Staff Office) received Georg Störck's nomination for the Oak Leaves, which had been sent on 18 February 1945, via teleprinter message on 26 February 1945. Major Joachim Domaschk requested on 3 March via teleprinter message from the nominating Führer-Begleit Division a detailed statement regarding the actions leading to the nomination. This statement was received by the HPA via the AOK 17 on 9 March. Major Domaschk approved this nomination on 10 March, indicating "Oak Leaves yes". Another nomination, bypassing the official command chain, was also submitted directly to the Führer's Adjutant of the Wehrmacht. This nomination was also submitted for official processing to the HPA on 11 March, where it arrived on 13 March. Domaschk then revoked his earlier decision and stated: "Insufficient explanatory statement, Requesting more details!". No further comments regarding the presentation or work in progress have been noted. The nomination list of the higher grade of the Knight's Cross of the Iron Cross with Oak Leaves indicates an entry date of 2 March 1945. Also noted is forwarding date of the Führer on 11 March. A presentation date is not stated. A comment indicating "Unfinished" was noted. Major Domaschk apparently halted the approval process on 13 March and was waiting for further clarifying information. It appears that this information never arrived before the end of the war. The Order Commission of the Association of Knight's Cross Recipients (AKCR) processed this case in 1978 and decided: "Oak Leaves yes, 9 May 1945". According to the AKCR the award was presented in accordance with the Dönitz-decree. This is illegal according to the Deutsche Dienststelle (WASt) and lacks legal justification. The presentation number "880" was assigned by the AKCR. The presentation date was assigned by Fellgiebel. Störck was a member of the AKCR.) | Heer | Hauptmann of the Reserves | Commander of the I./Panzergrenadier-Regiment Führer-Begleit-Division | 9 May 1945 | — | — |
| (881) | Franz Sensfuß? (Note: Franz Sensfuß's nomination for the Oak Leaves was received by the Heerespersonalamt (HPA—Army Staff Office) from the troop on 14 March 1945. Major Joachim Domaschk requested by teleprinter message the advisory opinion from the Commander-in-Chief of AOK 1 and Heeresgruppe B. The 212. Volksgrenadier-Division at the time was being encircled by US forces in the vicinity of Baumholder and went into captivity. Major Domaschk had sent a radio message to the nominating commander of the LXXX. Armeekorps: "Nomination deferred according to AHA 44 Ziff. 572." Domaschk noted on the nomination: "Deferred, because missing in action!" A presentation was never made. Sensfuß is not listed in the book for the "nominations for the higher grades of the Knight's Cross of the Iron Cross" nor in the nomination book for Knight's Cross (starting with Nr. 5100). The sequential number "881" was assigned by the Association of Knight's Cross Recipients (AKCR), the presentation date by Fellgiebel.) | Heer | Generalleutnant | Commander of the 212. Infanterie-Division | 9 May 1945 | — | — |
| (882) | Joseph von Radowitz? (Note: Joseph von Radowitz's nomination for the Oak Leaves was received by the Heerespersonalamt (HPA—Army Staff Office) from the troop on 30 April 1945 and approved by all intermittent commanding officers. Major Joachim Domaschk ruled that the nomination was insufficient and disapproved on 1 May and recommended "Decision by Chief of OKW". The file contains no indication whether this decision was ever taken. A teleprinter message was sent on 2 May to the nominating unit, the cavalry corps, and further messages to the commanding officers of the Panzer AOK 2 and Heeresgruppe Süd: "...was disapproved because ... the Führer criteria for the presentation guidelines have not been met. I.A. signed Maisel" The sequential number "882" was assigned by the Association of Knight's Cross Recipients (AKCR), the presentation date by Fellgiebel.) | Heer | Generalleutnant | Commander of 23. Panzer-Division | 9 May 1945 | — | — |
