= Upper Silesian offensive =

1945 military offensive by the USSR in the Eastern Front of WWII

- Part of the Silesian offensives on the Eastern Front of World War II
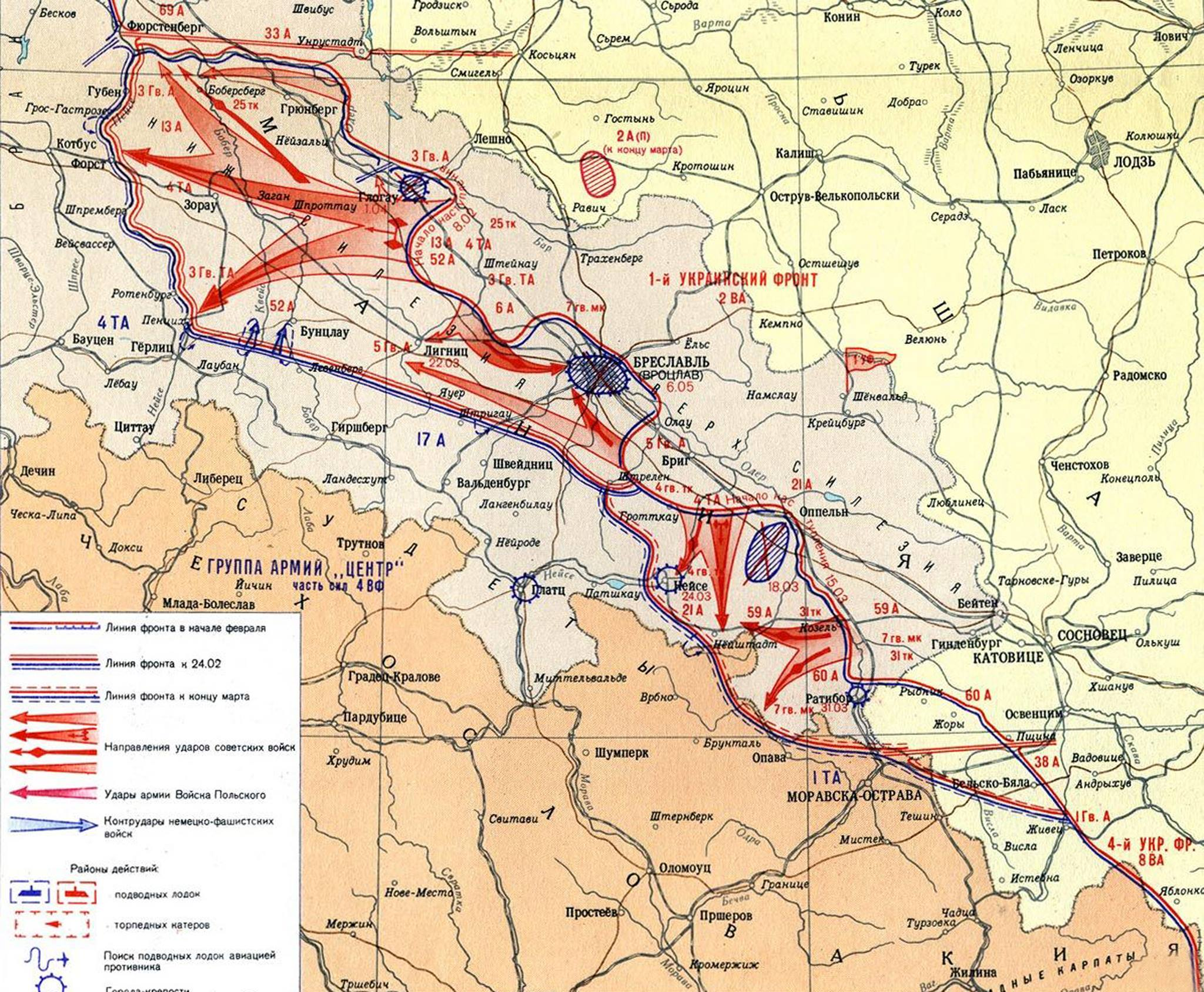
- Russian map of the Silesian offensives
Date	15–31 March 1945
Location	Upper Silesia, Germany
Result	Soviet victory

Belligerents
Germany	Soviet Union

Commanders and leaders
(Nazi Germany) Ferdinand Schörner	(Soviet Union) Ivan Konev

Strength
Unknown	408,400

Casualties and losses
Unknown	66,801 (including 15,876 irrecoverable)

The Upper Silesian offensive (Russian: Верхне-Силезская наступательная операция) was a strategically significant Soviet offensive on the Eastern Front of World War II in 1945. It was aimed at capturing the considerable industrial and natural resources located in Upper Silesia and involved forces of the 1st Ukrainian Front under Marshal Ivan Konev. Due to the importance of the region to the Germans, considerable forces were provided to Army Group Centre for its defence and the Germans were only slowly pushed back to the Czech border. Fighting for the region lasted from mid January right until the last day of the war in Europe on May 8, 1945.

== Prelude ==
After the end of the Soviet summer offensive of 1944 (Operation Bagration), the frontline of the Eastern Front had stabilised roughly in the middle of Poland, running from Riga on the Baltic coast over Warsaw via the Vistula to the Carpathian Mountains. Most of the pre-war German territory was still under control of the Third Reich at the end of 1944. On 12 january 1945, Soviet troops launched the simultaneous Vistula–Oder and Western Carpathian offensives.

The front lines in Silesia had been established at the end of the Vistula–Oder offensive in January, during which Konev's troops had forced the German Seventeenth Army of General Friedrich Schulz out of the industrial heartland of Upper Silesia around Kattowitz. The Lower Silesian offensive operation, taking place in February, had seen the northern wing of Konev's forces make further gains, closing up to the Neisse River. This had, however, left a long exposed flank to the south and east in the Sudeten Mountains, still held by Schulz's troops, which formed a potential threat to the proposed Soviet advance on Berlin.

=== Operation Gemse: the German counter-attacks at Lauban and Striegau ===
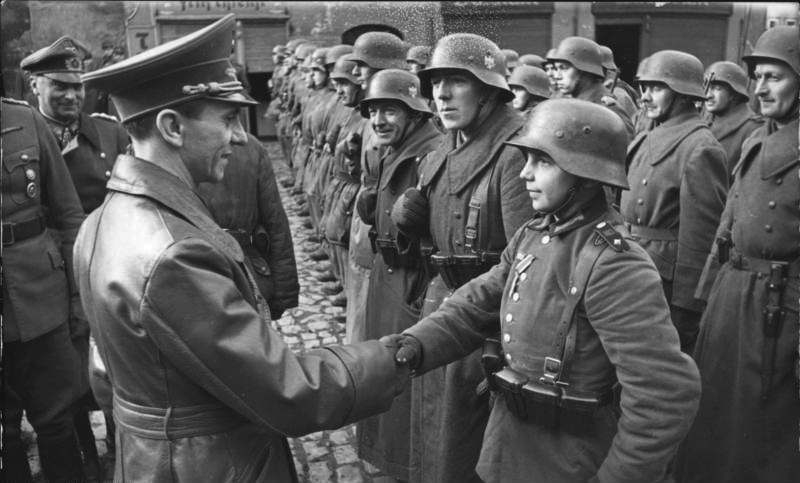
Joseph Goebbels awards 16-year-old Hitler Youth member Willi Hübner the Iron Cross for the defense of Lauban.

The commander of Army Group Centre, Field-Marshal Ferdinand Schörner, began to build up Schulz's forces during February for a counter-attack against the 3rd Guards Tank Army's spearheads, which had reached and taken Lauban during the Lower Silesian offensive. The LVI Panzer Corps and XXXIX Panzer Corps were grouped under the command of General Nehring; a two-pronged attack began on 1 March, with the 17th Panzer and Führer Grenadier Divisions attacking in the north, and 8th Panzer Division to the south.

The 3rd Guards Tank Army was initially taken by surprise, though by 3 March German forces found themselves threatened by Soviet counterattacks from Naumberg. As a result, Nehring decided on a more limited plan of encirclement. Rybalko's troops evacuated Lauban to avoid being cut off, and the town was retaken by the 6th Volksgrenadier Division. By 4 March, the encirclement was closed, though large numbers of Soviet troops were able to escape; within 4 days the trapped force had been destroyed (the fighting in Silesia has been characterised as "merciless", with German forces not taking prisoners).

Despite the limited nature of the victory, the recapture of Lauban was presented as a great success by German propaganda, with Joseph Goebbels visiting the town on 9 March to give a speech on the battle. Schörner made preparations for a further attack to the south-east at Striegau, which was commenced on 9 March. Though there were not enough forces available for a double envelopment, the Germans were able to penetrate the Soviet lines and cut off elements of the 5th Guards Army on the night of 11–12 March; there was an outbreak of panic amongst the trapped troops, who were massacred by Schörner's men as they tried to escape.

Schörner began to organise a more ambitious offensive to the north to relieve the besieged city of Breslau, moving Nehring's divisions northwards from Lauban by rail, but Konev acted decisively to regain the initiative in Silesia. Shifting the 4th Tank Army from the northern flank of his Front, he redeployed it near Grottkau in order to spearhead a major attack into Upper Silesia, neutralising the threat to the left flank of his forces and taking the area around Ratibor.

== Deployments ==
=== Red Army ===
- Southern wing of 1st Ukrainian Front (Marshal Ivan Konev)
  - 3rd Guards Tank Army (Colonel-General Pavel Rybalko)
  - 4th Tank Army (General Dmitry Lelyushenko)
  - 21st Army (General Dmitry Gusev)
  - 60th Army (General Pavel Kurochkin)
  - 59th Army (Major-General Ivan Korovnikov)
- Northern wing of 4th Ukrainian Front (Army-General Ivan Yefimovich Petrov)
  - 38th Army (General Kirill Moskalenko)

=== Wehrmacht ===
Divisional assignments to Corps as of 31 Dec. 1944. Units tended to move between Corps depending on situation.

- Army Group A (General Josef Harpe until 20 Jan 1945) until 25 Jan. 1945 then renamed Army Group Centre (later Army Group Schörner) (Field-Marshal Ferdinand Schörner)
  - Ninth Army (General Heinrich von Lüttwitz)
    - LVI Panzer Corps / Korpsgruppe Schlesien (General Rudolf Koch-Erpach)
      - incl. 17 ID, 214 ID
    - VIII Army Corps (General Walter Hartmann)
      - incl. 251 ID, 6 VGD
  - 4th Panzer Army (General Fritz-Hubert Gräser)
    - XXXXVIII Panzer Corps (General Maximilian von Edelsheim)
      - incl. 68 ID, 168 ID, 304 ID
  - Seventeenth Army (General Friedrich Schulz)
    - LIX Corps (General Edgar Röhricht later Georg Ritter von Hengl)
      - incl. 359 ID, 371 ID, 544 VGD
    - XI SS Corps (SS-Obergruppenführer Matthias Kleinheisterkamp)
      - incl. 78th Sturm Division, 320 VGD, 545 VGD
  - 1st Panzer Army (Colonel-General Gotthard Heinrici to 19 March, then General Walther Nehring)
    - XI Corps (General Horst von Mellenthin to 19 March, then General Rudolf von Bünau)
      - incl. 75 ID, 253 ID, 100 JD
    - XXXXIX Mountain Corps (General Karl von Le Suire)
      - incl. 254 ID, 97 JD, 101 JD, 1 SkiJD
  - 1st Hungarian Army (Colonel General Miklocz)
    - XVII Corps (General Wilhelm Fahrmbacher)
      - incl. 3 GebD, 4 GebD

Also present: 8th, 16th, 17th, 19th and 20th Panzer Divisions. These tended to pass between Corps. Also Führer Begleit Division, 18th SS Div., 20th SS GD, and Panzer Division Hermann Göring.

- Air support from Luftflotte 4.

== The offensive ==
Konev launched his main attack on 15 March. The 4th Tank Army broke through the German lines west of Oppeln and drove directly southward, heading for Neustadt. A subsidiary attack by the 4th Guards Tank Corps fanned out to take Neisse. South-east of Oppeln, the 59th and 60th Armies also broke through, the former swinging westwards to link up with the 4th Tank Army. The First Panzer Army's XI Corps, holding the lines near Oppeln, was now threatened with encirclement.

In the south, the 38th Army attacked German troops of the LIX Corps defending with their backs to the highlands of Moravia. By means of a limited tactical withdrawal on 10 March, Heinrici was able to minimise the damage inflicted by the preparatory bombardment, and the front in this sector remained firm.

=== The encirclement at Oppeln ===
The LVI Panzer Corps positioned near Oppeln also started to pull back, but the 20th Grenadier (Estonian) Division of the SS and 168th Infantry Division found themselves trapped by the advance of the 4th Tank Army and 59th Army which linked up near Neustadt. By the 22nd, Soviet forces of the 59th and 21st Armies succeeded in reducing the Oppeln 'cauldron' (German: Kessel), claiming to have killed 15,000 and captured a further 15,000 of the German troops trapped there.

Konev launched further attacks on 24 March, and by 31 March, when Ratibor and Katscher were taken, was able to declare the offensive phase of operations over.

== Aftermath ==
The Upper Silesian Offensive succeeded in stabilising Konev's left flank in preparation for the advance on Berlin, and removed the threat of any German counter-attacks from Army Group Centre. The lines in Silesia remained largely unchanged until the end of the war, when Schoerner's force surrendered.
