= 81st Infantry Division (Wehrmacht) =

- German: 81. Infanterie-Division
- Divisional insignia
- Active: 1 December 1939 – 8 May 1945
- Country: Nazi Germany
- Branch: Army
- Type: Infantry
- Size: Division
- Engagements: Battle of France; Operation Barbarossa; Demyansk Pocket; Siege of Leningrad; Leningrad–Novgorod Offensive; Courland Pocket

Commanders
- Notable commanders: Erich Schopper

The 81st Infantry Division (German: 81. Infanterie-Division) was an infantry division of the German Army during World War II. It was active from 1939 until 1945 and served primarily on the Eastern Front.

== History ==
The 81st Infantry Division was formed as an infantry division of the 6th Aufstellungswelle at Neuhammer training area on 1 December 1939, following an OKH directive of 11 November. It was initially staffed primarily with personnel of Wehrkreis III and Wehrkreis IV and armed with captured Czechoslovak military equipment that had fallen into German hands falling the German annexation of Czechoslovakia in March 1939. It was initially equipped with the Infantry Regiments 161, 174 and 189, each with three battalions for a divisional total of nine battalions, as well as Artillery Regiment 181 with four detachments. Additionally, the division was equipped with the Division Units 181 for divisional support.

As part of the partial demobilization of the German armed forces following the Battle of France, the 81st Infantry Division was suspended between August 1940 and February 1941, when it was recalled to duty and intermittently deployed to German-occupied France. After the commencement of Operation Barbarossa, the division was strengthened on 12 December 1941 with elements of the 225th Infantry Division and then deployed to the Eastern Front in January 1942.

On the Eastern Front, the division initially served under 16th Army of Army Group North, though Infantry Regiment 189 and the artillery detachment II./181 were detached as a separate Kampfgruppe and placed under the supervision of Army Group Center. This Kampfgruppe was mostly destroyed at Toropets and subsequently dissolved on 31 May 1942. While the II./181 detachment was redeployed to bring Artillery Regiment 181 back up to strength, the same was initially not true for Infantry Regiment 189, which was only reassembled on 22 September 1943. As all "Infantry Regiment" formations had been renamed to "Grenadier Regiment" by OKH directive on 15 October 1942, the new regiment was known as Grenadier Regiment 189. Likewise, the 161st and 174th Regiments were also known as "Grenadier Regiments" after October 1942. The new 189th Regiment was formed from the II./161 and II./174 battalions; the division's strength in terms of number of regiments did not increase with the new addition of Grenadier Regiment 189. The battalions III./161 and III./174 were then renamed to become II./161 and II./174, leaving the division with three regiments, each with a I./ and II./ battalion.

On 16 January 1944, the Reconnaissance Squadron 181 was restructured into the Division Fusilier Battalion 61.

On 18 August 1944, Grenadier Regiment 161 was dissolved following heavy combat at Biržai and its remnants merged into Grenadier Regiment 189. The Division Fusilier Battalion 61 was also briefly dissolved, but subsequently recreated on 4 October 1944. The 181st Infantry Division had shrunk to Kampfgruppe strength and could field between four and five battalions worth of combat strength towards the end of the war. After its parent army had gotten trapped in the Courland Pocket, the 81st Infantry Division was eventually taken into Soviet captivity after the war's end.

== Order of battle ==
=== 1939 ===
- Infantry Regiment 161
- Infantry Regiment 174
- Infantry Regiment 189
- Artillery Regiment 181
- Engineer Battalion 181
- Anti-Tank Detachment 181
- Infantry Divisions Message Detachment 181
- Infantry Divisions Supply Leader 181

=== 1944 ===
- Grenadier Regiment 161
- Grenadier Regiment 174
- Grenadier Regiment 189
- Divisions Fusilier Battalion 61
- Artillery Regiment 181
- Engineer Battalion 181
- Panzerjäger Detachment 181
- Infantry Divisions Message Detachment 181
- Infantry Divisions Supply Leader 181

== Commanding officers ==
- Generalleutnant Friedrich-Wilhelm von Loeper (1 December 1939 – 5 October 1940)
- Generalmajor Hugo Ribstein (5 October 1940 – 8 December 1941)
- Generalleutnant Erich Schopper (8 December 1941 – 1 March 1943)
- Generalleutnant Gottfried Weber (1 March 1943 – 13 March 1943)
- Generalleutnant Erich Schopper (13 March 1943 – 1 June 1943)
- Generalleutnant Gottfried Weber (1 June 1943 – 30 June 1943)
- Generalleutnant Erich Schopper (30 June 1943 – 5 April 1944)
- Generalleutnant Vollrath Lübbe (5 April 1944 – 1 July 1944)
- Generalmajor der Reserve Dr. Ernst Meiners (1 July 1944 – 10 July 1944)
- Generalleutnant Franz-Eccard von Bentivegni (10 July 1944 – 8 May 1945)
