= 205th Infantry Division (Wehrmacht) =

- 205. Infanterie-Division
- Insignia of the 205th Infantry Division
- Active: 1 January 1940 – 8 May 1945
- Country: Nazi Germany
- Branch: Heer (Wehrmacht)
- Type: Infantry
- Size: Division
- Nickname: "Mushroom Division"
- Engagements: World War II; Phony War; Occupation of France; Eastern Front; Operation Bagration; Courland Pocket

Commanders
- Notable commanders: Paul Seyffardt; Horst von Mellenthin; Karl-Hans Giese

The 205th Infantry Division (German: 205. Infanterie-Division) was a German infantry division of the Heer during the Second World War. It was initially known as the 14th Landwehr Division (German: 14. Landwehr-Division).

== Operational history ==
=== 14th Landwehr Division ===
The 14th Landwehr Division was formed on 26 August 1939, the day of Germany's general mobilization, as the sole division of the Landwehr national militia service that had not yet been converted into an infantry division of 3rd Aufstellungswelle type. The Landwehr divisions had initially been planned in 1936 to assemble the older cadres (mostly of the age to have served in World War I) into 21 divisions, with various army service stations readied for this task. Assembled in Wehrkreis V by Army Service Station 7 (in Freiburg/Breisgau), the 14th Landwehr Division initially consisted of the Landwehr Infantry Regiments 40, 59, and 182, each with three battalions, from Offenburg, Freiburg/Breisgau and Müllheim, respectively. It was joined on 25 September by Landwehr Infantry Regiment 33 from Karlsruhe, which had up until that point been assigned to 35th Infantry Division. The initial commander of the 14th Landwehr Division was Ernst Richter. Whereas much of the initial personnel of the 14th Landwehr Division consisted of older men, there was an attempt to gradually replace the older cadres by younger men later in the war.

The 14th Landwehr Division served on defensive duty on the Upper Rhine, being a subordinate of 7th Army under Army Group C, until the 14th Landwehr Division received orders on 26 December 1939 to be reorganized on 1 January 1940 to become the 205th Infantry Division.

=== Occupation duty in France ===
The 205th Infantry Division was formed on 1 January 1940 from the redesignation of the 14th Landwehr Division. In the 205th Infantry Division, the former Landwehr Infantry Regiments 40, 59 and 182 became the Infantry Regiments 335, 353 and 358. Landwehr Infantry Regiment 33 left the division until it was attached on the 17 January 1940 (under the name "Infantry Regiment 326") to the 198th Infantry Division. These three infantry regiments were additionally joined by a group of support units ("Division Units 205") as well as Artillery Regiment 205, which was drawn together from various elements of Artillery Regiment 218, the Landwehr Artillery Detachment 14 and Artillery Regiment 207.

On 20 February 1940, the battalion II./335 was transferred (as II./664) to the 557th Infantry Division. The division's fighting personnel was suspended from duty as part of the partial demobilization of the German armed forces in mid-1940 and was sent home (besides the core staffs) on 17 July 1940. The division was subsequently recalled to duty in February 1941.

The 205th Infantry Division was posted with the XXV Army Corps in German-occupied France between March 1941 and January 1942 (a timeframe during which it passed numerous contingents to the 88th Infantry Division to reinforce the Eastern Front), before it was transferred to the reserves of Army Group Center on the Eastern Front in February.

=== Eastern Front ===
In February 1942, the 205th Infantry Division was transferred to the Eastern Front. On 1 March 1942, Paul Seyffardt took command of the 205th Infantry Division. Between March and October 1942, the division was assigned to LIX Army Corps in the Velizh sector, before it was transferred via a short stay at the XXXXI Panzer Corps to the VI Army Corps of 9th Army at Velikiye Luki. In early 1943, the 205th Infantry Division belonged to Group Jaschke, led by Erich Jaschke of 20th Motorized Division. On 28 April 1943, the division received significant cuts following its heavy casualties; The battalions I./358, I./335 and III./353 were dissolved, reducing the strength of the division from nine to six battalions. Regiment 358 was subsequently split, donating one each of its two remaining battalions to the other regiments, leaving the division with two regiments of three battalions each. The division remained in the Velikiye Luki sector until September 1943, at which point it was part of XXXXIII Army Corps. In October 1943, the XXXXIII Corps was placed subordinate to Army Group North, where the corps was placed under the supervision of 16th Army. On 15 July 1943, Edmund Blaurock took temporary command of the division until Seyffardt returned to his post on 15 August. Seyffardt was finally succeeded by Ernst Michael, a short-lived commander in the rank of colonel who was eventually succeeded by Horst von Mellenthin on 1 December 1943. On 30 April 1944, Grenadier Regiment 358 was reconstituted using I./335, III./353 and some elements of Grenadier Regiment 559 of 331st Infantry Division. This left the division with three regiments of two battalions each.

Starting in 1944, Army Group North was continuously pushed back; the 205th Infantry Division served sequentially with the I Army Corps in the Nevel sector from January to June, with II Army Corps in the Polotsk sector in July and eventually back with XXXXIII Corps in the Daugavpils sector in August. On 22 June 1944, the Leningrad Front, 3rd Baltic Front, 2nd Baltic Front and 1st Baltic Front (from north to south) launched a major offensive against Army Group North as part of the greater Soviet Operation Bagration. The 205th Infantry Division became the target of very heavy Soviet targets in its positions north of Obol and northeast of Polotsk.

After the massive Soviet summer offensives of 1944, Army Group North was pushed into the Livonia region and eventually onto the Courland Peninsula, where it became trapped in the so-called Courland Pocket. From December 1944 to February 1945, the 205th Infantry Division was part of the XXXVIII Army Corps of the 16th Army in the Courland Pocket. After a brief interlude during which the division was commanded by a colonel, Ernst Biehler, from 20 October until 15 November 1944, Karl-Hans Giese took command on 15 November (and would hold it until the end of the war).

Following the redesignations of the German army groups on 25 January 1945, the army group of the 205th Infantry Division was known as "Army Group Courland". The 205th Infantry Division remained part of Army Group Courland until the end of the war, first as part of L Army Corps in March 1945 and finally under XVI Army Corps in April.

== Organizational history ==
=== Order of battle ===
205th Infantry Division order of battle
Date	Subordinate units
1 January 1940	Infantry Regiment 335 (three battalions); Infantry Regiment 353 (three battalions); Infantry Regiment 358 (three battalions); Artillery Regiment 205 (four detachments); Division Units 205
30 April 1944	Grenadier Regiment 335 (two battalions); Grenadier Regiment 353 (two battalions); Grenadier Regiment 358 (two battalions); Fusilier Battalion 205; Artillery Regiment 205 (four detachments); Division Units 205

=== Superior formations ===
205th Infantry Division superior formations
Year	Date	Army Corps	Army	Army Group	Operational area
1940	Jan.	XXV	7th Army	Army Group C	Upper Rhine
1940	Feb.–May	OKH reserves			
1940	Jun.	VI	2nd Army	Army Group A	German-occupied France
1940	Jul.	Army reserves	12th Army	Army Group C	German-occupied France
1940	Aug.–Dec.	On vacation in Wehrkreis V			
1941	Jan.–Feb.	On vacation in Wehrkreis V			
1941	Mar.–Apr.	XXV	6th Army	Army Group D	Atlantic coast
1941	May–Dec.	XXV	7th Army	Army Group D	Atlantic coast
1942	Jan.	XXV	7th Army	Army Group D	Atlantic coast
1942	Feb.	Army group reserves		Army Group Center	Vitebsk
1942	Mar.–Oct.	LIX	3rd Panzer Army	Army Group Center	Velizh
1942	Nov.	XXXXI	9th Army	Army Group Center	Velikiye Luki
1942	Dec.	VI	9th Army	Army Group Center	Velikiye Luki
1943	Jan.	VI	9th Army	Army Group Center	Velikiye Luki
1943	Feb.	LIX	3rd Panzer Army	Army Group Center	Velikiye Luki
1943	Mar.	Army reserves	3rd Panzer Army	Army Group Center	Velikiye Luki
1943	Apr.–Sep.	XXXXIII	3rd Panzer Army	Army Group Center	Velikiye Luki
1943	Oct.–Dec.	XXXXIII	16th Army	Army Group North	Nevel
1944	Jan.–Jun.	I	16th Army	Army Group North	Nevel
1944	Jul.	II	16th Army	Army Group North	Polotsk
1944	Aug.	XXXXIII	16th Army	Army Group North	Daugavpils
1944	Sep.	I	16th Army	Army Group North	Livonia
1944	Oct.	VI SS	16th Army	Army Group North	Courland Pocket
1944	Nov.	Army group reserves		Army Group North	Courland Pocket
1944	Dec.	XXXVIII	16th Army	Army Group North	Courland Pocket
1945	Jan.	XXXVIII	16th Army	Army Group North	Courland Pocket
1945	Feb.	XXXVIII	16th Army	Army Group Courland	Courland Pocket
1945	Mar.	L	18th Army	Army Group Courland	Courland Pocket
1945	Apr.	XVI	16th Army	Army Group Courland	Courland Pocket
