= Gottfried Weber (general) =

German general (1899–1958)

- Born: Gottfried Ludwig Weber; 31 January 1899; German Empire
- Died: 16 August 1958 (aged 59); Villach, Austria
- Military career
- Allegiance: German Empire; Weimar Republic; Nazi Germany; West Germany
- Branch: German Army; Bundeswehr
- Service years: 1917–1920; 1934–1945; 1956–1958
- Rank: Generalleutnant; Generalmajor
- Commands: 81st Infantry Division; 61st Infantry Division; 93rd Infantry Division; 12th Luftwaffe Field Division; XVI Army Corps
- Conflicts: World War II; Invasion of Poland; Battle of Belgium; Battle of France; Battle of Dunkirk; Operation Barbarossa; Siege of Leningrad; Courland Pocket
- Awards: Knight's Cross of the Iron Cross with Oak Leaves

Gottfried Ludwig Weber (31 January 1899 – 16 August 1958) was a German general (Generalleutnant) in the Wehrmacht during World War II. He was a recipient of the Knight's Cross of the Iron Cross with Oak Leaves of Nazi Germany.

Weber surrendered to the Soviet forces in May 1945 in the Courland Pocket. Convicted in the Soviet Union as a war criminal, he was held until 1955. In 1956 Weber joined the Bundeswehr, reaching the rank of Generalmajor. He died on 16 August 1958 in an automobile collision in Villach, Austria.

== Awards and decorations ==
- Iron Cross (1939) 2nd Class (27 September 1939) & 1st Class (20 October 1939)
- German Cross in Gold on 16 February 1943 as Oberst in Grenadier-Regiment 176
- Knight's Cross of the Iron Cross with Oak Leaves
  - Knight's Cross on 13 October 1941 as Major and commander of I./Infanterie-Regiment 162
  - 490th Oak Leaves on 9 June 1944 as Generalmajor and commander of 12. Luftwaffen-Feld-Division

Military offices
Preceded by Generalleutnant Erich Schopper	Commander of 81. Infanterie-Division; 1 March 1943 – 13 March 1943	Succeeded by Generalleutnant Erich Schopper
Preceded by Generalleutnant Günther Krappe	Commander of 61. Infanterie-Division; April 1943 – May 1943	Succeeded by Generalleutnant Günther Krappe
Preceded by General der Pioniere Otto Tiemann	Commander of 93. Infanterie-Division; 1 May 1943 – 31 May 1943	Succeeded by General der Pioniere Otto Tiemann
Preceded by Generalleutnant Erich Schopper	Commander of 81. Infanterie-Division; 1 June 1943 – 30 June 1943	Succeeded by Generalleutnant Erich Schopper
Preceded by Oberst Wolfgang Kretzschmar	Commander of 12. Luftwaffen-Feld-Division; 15 November 1943 – March 1945	Succeeded by Generalleutnant Franz Schlieper
Preceded by General der Infanterie Ernst-Anton von Krosigk	Commander of XVI. Armeekorps; March 1945 – May 1945	Succeeded by None
