= Otto Tiemann =

German general (1890–1952)

- Born: 12 February 1890
- Died: 20 April 1952 (aged 62)
- Military career
- Allegiance: German Empire; Weimar Republic; Nazi Germany
- Branch: German Army
- Service years: 1908–1945
- Rank: General der Pioniere
- Commands: 93rd Infantry Division; XXIII Army Corps; XVII Army Corps
- Conflicts: World War I; World War II; Battle of France; Operation Barbarossa; Siege of Leningrad; Battle for Velikiye Luki (1943); Battle of Narva (1944)
- Awards: Knight's Cross of the Iron Cross

Heinrich Andreas Otto Tiemann (12 February 1890 – 20 April 1952) was a German general during World War II who commanded several corps. He was a recipient of the Knight's Cross of the Iron Cross.

== Promotions ==
- 3. or 8.3.1908 Fahnenjunker
- 17.8.1909 Leutnant mit Patent vom 17.8.1907
- 27.1.1915 Oberleutnant
- 28.12.1916 Hauptmann
  - 1.2.1922 neues Rangdienstalter (RDA) vom 28.12.1916 erhalten
- 1.2.1930 Major mit RDA vom 01.02.1928
- 1.4.1932 Oberstleutnant
- 1.6.1934 Oberst
- 1.10.1937 Generalmajor
- 1.10.1939 Generalleutnant
- 1.5.1944 General der Pioniere

== Awards ==
- Iron Cross (1914) 2nd Class & 1st Class
- Wound Badge (1918) in Black
- The Honour Cross of the World War 1914/1918 with swords
- Wehrmacht Long Service Award, 4th to 1st class
- Iron Cross (1939) 2nd Class & 1st Class
- Eastern Front Medal (26 July 1942)
- German Cross in Gold (19 December 1941)
- Knight's Cross of the Iron Cross on 28 April 1943 as Generalleutnant and commander of 93. Infanterie-Division

Military offices
Preceded by None	Commander of 93. Infanterie-Division; 17 September 1939 - 1 May 1943	Succeeded by Generalleutnant Gottfried Weber
Preceded by Generalleutnant Gottfried Weber	Commander of 93. Infanterie-Division; 31 May 1943 - September 1943	Succeeded by General der Artillerie Horst von Mellenthin
Preceded by General der Panzertruppe Hans Freiherr von Funck	Commander of XXIII. Armeekorps; 2 February 1944 - 12 October 1944	Succeeded by General der Infanterie Walter Melzer
Preceded by General der Gebirgstruppen Hans Kreysing	Commander of XVII. Armeekorps; 28 December 1944 - May 1945	Succeeded by None
