= Hans Kreysing =

German World War II general (1890–1969)

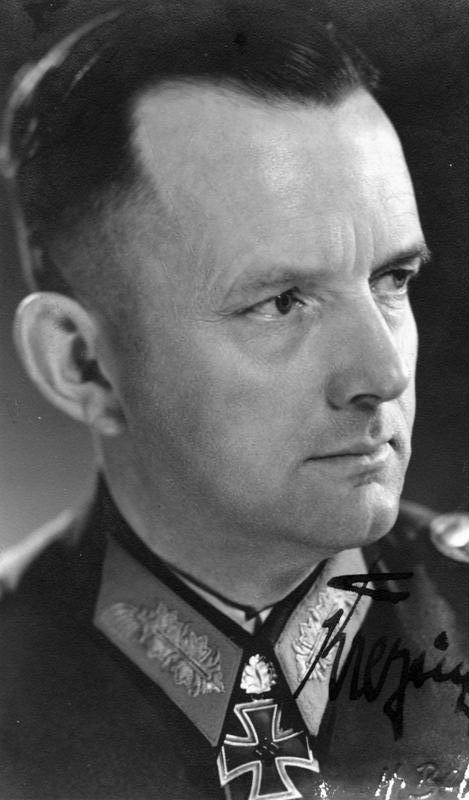
- Born: 17 August 1890; Göttingen, German Empire
- Died: 14 April 1969 (aged 78); Oldenburg, West Germany
- Military career
- Allegiance: German Empire; Weimar Republic; Nazi Germany
- Branch: Imperial German Army; Reichswehr; German Army
- Service years: 1909–1945
- Rank: General der Gebirgstruppe
- Commands: 3rd Mountain Division; XVIII Army Corps; 8th Army
- Conflicts: World War I; Battle of Verdun; World War II
- Awards: Knight's Cross of the Iron Cross with Oak Leaves and Swords
- Other work: Red Cross

Hans Kreysing (17 August 1890 – 14 April 1969) was a German general who commanded the 3rd Mountain Division and the 8th Army in World War II. He was a recipient of the Knight's Cross of the Iron Cross with Oak Leaves and Swords.

== Life and career ==
Hans Kreysing was born in Göttingen in the Prussian Province of Hanover on 17 August 1890. He entered the Royal Prussian Army in October 1909, later joining the 10th Jäger battalion. He fought in World War I and served as the commander of a machine gun company in the 10th Reserve Jäger battalion. At the end of the war, he was an Oberleutnant. He remained in the post-war Reichswehr as a career officer. He became a battalion and regimental commander between 1934 and 1940.

At the outbreak of World War II, he was in command of the 16th Infantry Regiment. From October 1940 to August 1943 he commanded the 3rd Mountain Division, serving in Norway, Lapland and the eastern front. Continuing on the eastern front, Kreysing led the XVII Army Corps from November 1943 to April 1944, when he took command of the 8th Army, which surrendered to Allied troops in Austria in May 1945. Kreysing ended the war with the rank of General of Mountain Troops (German: General der Gebirgstruppe).

== Awards ==
- Iron Cross (1914)
  - 2nd class
  - 1st class
- Knight's Cross of the House Order of Hohenzollern with swords
- Military Merit Order of Bavaria, 4th class with swords
- Hanseatic Cross of Hamburg
- Military Merit Cross of Austria-Hungary, 3rd class with war decoration
- Wound Badge in black
- Honour Cross of the World War 1914/1918
- Clasp to the Iron Cross (1939)
  - 2nd class
  - 1st class
- Knight's Cross of the Iron Cross with Oak Leaves and Swords
  - Knight's Cross on 29 May 1940 as Oberst (Colonel) and commander of Infanterie-Regiment 16
  - 183rd Oak Leaves on 20 January 1943 as Generalleutnant and commander of the 3. Gebirgs-Division
  - 63rd Swords on 13 April 1944 as General der Gebirgstruppe and commanding general of the XVII. Armeekorps

Military offices
Preceded by General der Gebirgstruppen Julius Ringel	Commander of 3. Gebirgs-Division; 23 October 1940 – 10 August 1943	Succeeded by Generalleutnant Egbert Picker
Preceded by General der Artillerie Erich Brandenberger	Commander of XVII. Armeekorps; 1 November 1943 – 27 April 1944	Succeeded by Generalleutnant Dr. Franz Beyer
Preceded by Generalleutnant Dr. Franz Beyer	Commander of XVII. Armeekorps; 25 May 1944 – 28 December 1944	Succeeded by General der Pioniere Otto Tiemann
Preceded by General der Infanterie Otto Wöhler	Commander of 8. Armee; 28 December 1944 – 8 May 1945	Succeeded by none
