= 93rd Infantry Division (Wehrmacht) =

- 93. Infanterie-Division
- Divisional insignia
- Active: 1939–45
- Country: Nazi Germany
- Branch: Army
- Type: Infantry
- Size: Division
- Engagements: World War II

Commanders
- Notable commanders: Otto Tiemann; Gottfried Weber; Horst von Mellenthin; Karl Löwrick

The 93rd Infantry Division (German 93. Infanterie-Division) was a German infantry division that was formed in the fall of 1939. The division fought in the Second World War in both the Battle of France and on the Eastern Front. It was ultimately destroyed by the Red Army in March 1945 while defending East Prussia.

== France ==
In the spring and early summer of 1940, the division was located near the Maginot Line at Saarbrücken. On 15 June 1940 the division launched its attack south of the city, breaking through the French line and continuing its advance across the Seille and Meurthe rivers, south to the region of the Moselle river. It consolidated between Nancy and Epinal and was ordered to stop on 25 June.

== Eastern Front ==
After the campaign in France, the division was stationed along the French coast until June 1941, when it was reattached to Army Group North (Heeresgruppe Nord) in preparation for Operation Barbarossa (the invasion of the Soviet Union). The division saw much action during its advance on Leningrad, and then in the subsequent defensive battles against the Soviet winter offensive.

The division fought and held its lines throughout 1942; in August, the 271st Infantry Regiment was given the honorific of "Feldherrnhalle", due to its outstanding performance during the campaigns in France and the Soviet Union.

In the summer of 1943, the division was pulled out of the line and sent to Poland to rest and refit. While there, the 271st Infantry Regiment "Feldherrnhalle" was removed from the division and became the nucleus of the new 60th Panzergrenadier Division "Feldherrnhalle".

The refitted division was once again attached to Army Group North, taking part in desperate attempts to maintain the siege of Leningrad. The division was pushed back with the rest of Army Group North. By late 1944 it was trapped in the Courland Pocket with the now renamed Army Group Courland.

The division was evacuated from Courland at the beginning of 1945 and after a short rest, was sent to Samland, a peninsula on the Baltic coast in Eastern Prussia, where it was destroyed by the Red Army in March.

== Organisation ==
1939

- Infanterie-Regiment 270
- Infanterie-Regiment 271
- Infanterie-Regiment 272
- Artillerie-Regiment 193
- Aufklärungs-Abteilung 193
- Panzerjäger-Abteilung 193
- Pioniere-Abteilung 193
- Nachrichten-Abteilung 193

1943

- Grenadier-Regiment 270
- Grenadier-Regiment 272
- Grenadier-Regiment 273
- Artillerie-Regiment 193
- Fusilier-Abteilung 91

== Commanding officers ==
- General der Pionere Otto Tiemann, 1 September 1939 - 1 May 1943
- Generalleutnant Gottfried Weber, 1 May 1943 - 31 May 1943
- General der Pionere Otto Tiemann, 31 May 1943 - September 1943
- General der Artillerie Horst von Mellenthin, September 1943 - 1 October 1943
- Generalleutnant Karl Löwrick, 1 October 1943 - 20 June 1944
- Generalleutnant Erich Hofmann, 20 June 1944 - 27 July 1944
- Oberst Hermann, 27 July 1944 - 1 September 1944
- Generalmajor Kurt Domansky, 1 September 1944 - March 1945
