= Paul Gurran =

- Born: 11 January 1893
- Died: 22 April 1944 (aged 51)
- Military career
- Allegiance: German Empire; Weimar Republic; Nazi Germany
- Branch: Army
- Service years: 1908–1945
- Rank: Generalleutnant (Posthumously)
- Commands: 23rd Infantry Division
- Conflicts: World War II: Operation Barbarossa; Siege of Leningrad †
- Awards: Knight's Cross of the Iron Cross

Paul Gurran (11 January 1893 – 22 April 1944) was a German general in the Wehrmacht during World War II. He was a recipient of the Knight's Cross of the Iron Cross of Nazi Germany. He was married to Irmgard Begrich, a cousin of Joachim Begrich. Gurran died on 22 April 1944 in a field hospital in the occupied Soviet Union. He was posthumously promoted to Generalleutnant.

== Awards and decorations ==
- Knight's Cross of the Iron Cross on 12 September 1941 as Oberst and commander of Infanterie-Regiment 506

Military offices
Preceded by General der Artillerie Horst von Mellenthin	Commander of 23. Infanterie-Division; 1 September 1943 - 22 February 1944	Succeeded by Generalleutnant Walter Charles de Beaulieu
