= XI Army Corps (Wehrmacht) =

- XI. Armeekorps
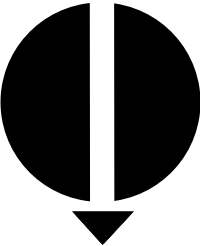
- Active: October 1936 – May 1945
- Country: Nazi Germany
- Branch: Army
- Size: Corps
- Engagements: World War II: Invasion of Poland; Siege of Warsaw (1939); Battle of France; Operation Barbarossa; Case Blue; Battle of Stalingrad; Battle of Kursk; Belgorod-Kharkov Offensive Operation; Lower Dnieper Offensive; Dnieper–Carpathian Offensive; Cherkassy Pocket; Lvov–Sandomierz Offensive; Battle of Dukla Pass; Upper Silesian Offensive; Prague Offensive

Commanders
- Notable commanders: Karl Strecker; Erhard Raus

German XI. Corps (XI. Armeekorps) was a corps in the German Army during World War II.

== Commanders ==
- Artillery General (General der Artillerie) Emil Leeb, 1 September 1939 – 1 March 1940
- Infantry General (General der Infanterie) Joachim von Kortzfleisch, 1 March 1940 – 6 October 1941
- Infantry General (General der Infanterie) Eugen Ott, 6 October 1941 – 10 December 1941
- Infantry General (General der Infanterie) Joachim von Kortzfleisch, 10 December 1941 – 1 June 1942
- Colonel-General (Generaloberst) Karl Strecker, 1 June 1942 – 2 February 1943

After reformation

- Colonel-General (Generaloberst) Erhard Raus, 10 February 1943 – 1 November 1943
- Artillery General (General der Artillerie) Wilhelm Stemmermann, 5 December 1943 – 18 February 1944
- Infantry General (General der Infanterie) Rudolf von Bünau, 20 March 1944 – 16 March 1945
- Artillery General (General der Artillerie) Horst von Mellenthin, 16 March 1945 – 20 March 1945
- Infantry General (General der Infanterie) Rudolf von Bünau, 20 March 1945 – 6 April 1945
- Infantry General (General der Infanterie) Friedrich Wiese, 6 April 1945 – 8 May 1945

== Area of operations ==
- Poland - September 1939 - May 1940
- France - May 1940 - June 1941
- Eastern Front, southern sector - June 1941 - October 1942
- Stalingrad - October 1942 - February 1943
- Eastern Front, southern sector - March 1943 - January 1944
- Cherkassy - January 1944 - February 1944
- Poland, Silesia & Czechoslovakia - April 1944 - May 1945

== See also ==
- List of German corps in World War II

== Bibliography ==
- Tessin, Georg. Verbände und Truppen der deutschen Wehrmacht und Waffen–SS im Zweiten Weltkrieg 1939–1945 [Units and Troops of the German Military and Waffen-SS in the Second World War 1939–1945] (in German). Vol. 2: Die Landstreitkräfte 6–14 (Ground Units 6–14). Osnabrück: Biblio.
