= Erich Schopper =

- Born: 2 July 1892
- Died: 18 August 1978 (aged 86)
- Military career
- Allegiance: German Empire; Weimar Republic; Nazi Germany
- Branch: Army
- Service years: 1912–1945
- Rank: Generalleutnant
- Commands: 81st Infantry Division
- Conflicts: World War I World War II: Battle of France; Operation Barbarossa; Siege of Leningrad; Demyansk Pocket
- Awards: Knight's Cross of the Iron Cross

Erich Schopper (2 July 1892 – 18 August 1978) was a German general in the Wehrmacht during World War II. He was a recipient of the Knight's Cross of the Iron Cross of Nazi Germany.

== Awards ==
- Knight's Cross of the Iron Cross on 30 April 1943 as Generalleutnant and commander of 81. Infanterie-Division

Military offices
Preceded by Generalmajor Hugo Ribstein	Commander of 81. Infanterie-Division; 8 December 1941 - 1 March 1943	Succeeded by Generalleutnant Gottfried Weber
Preceded by Generalleutnant Gottfried Weber	Commander of 81. Infanterie-Division; 13 March 1943 - 1 June 1943	Succeeded by Generalleutnant Gottfried Weber
Preceded by Generalleutnant Gottfried Weber	Commander of 81. Infanterie-Division; 30 June 1943 - 5 April 1944	Succeeded by Generalleutnant Vollrath Lübbe
