= Silesian offensives =

1945 military offensives by the USSR in the Eastern Front of WWII

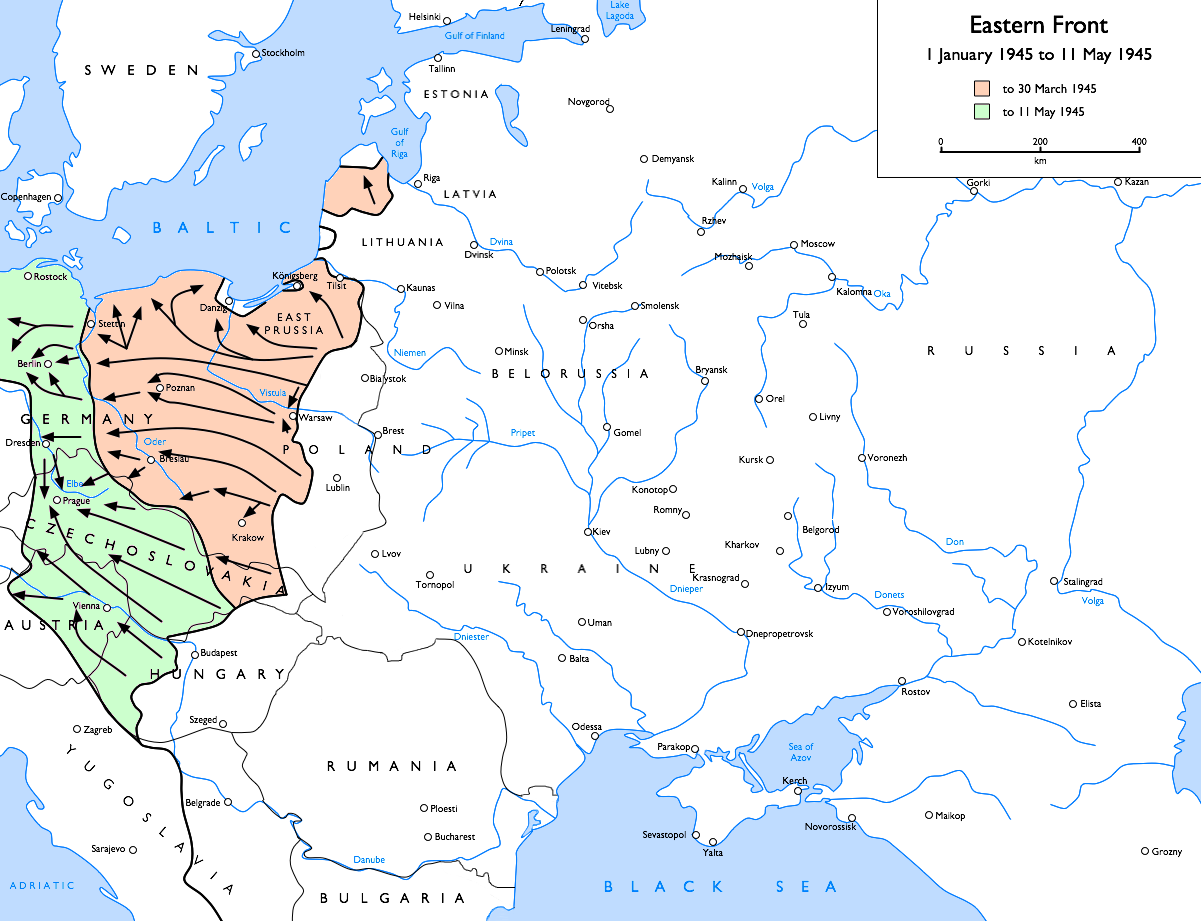
World War II Eastern Front during 1945

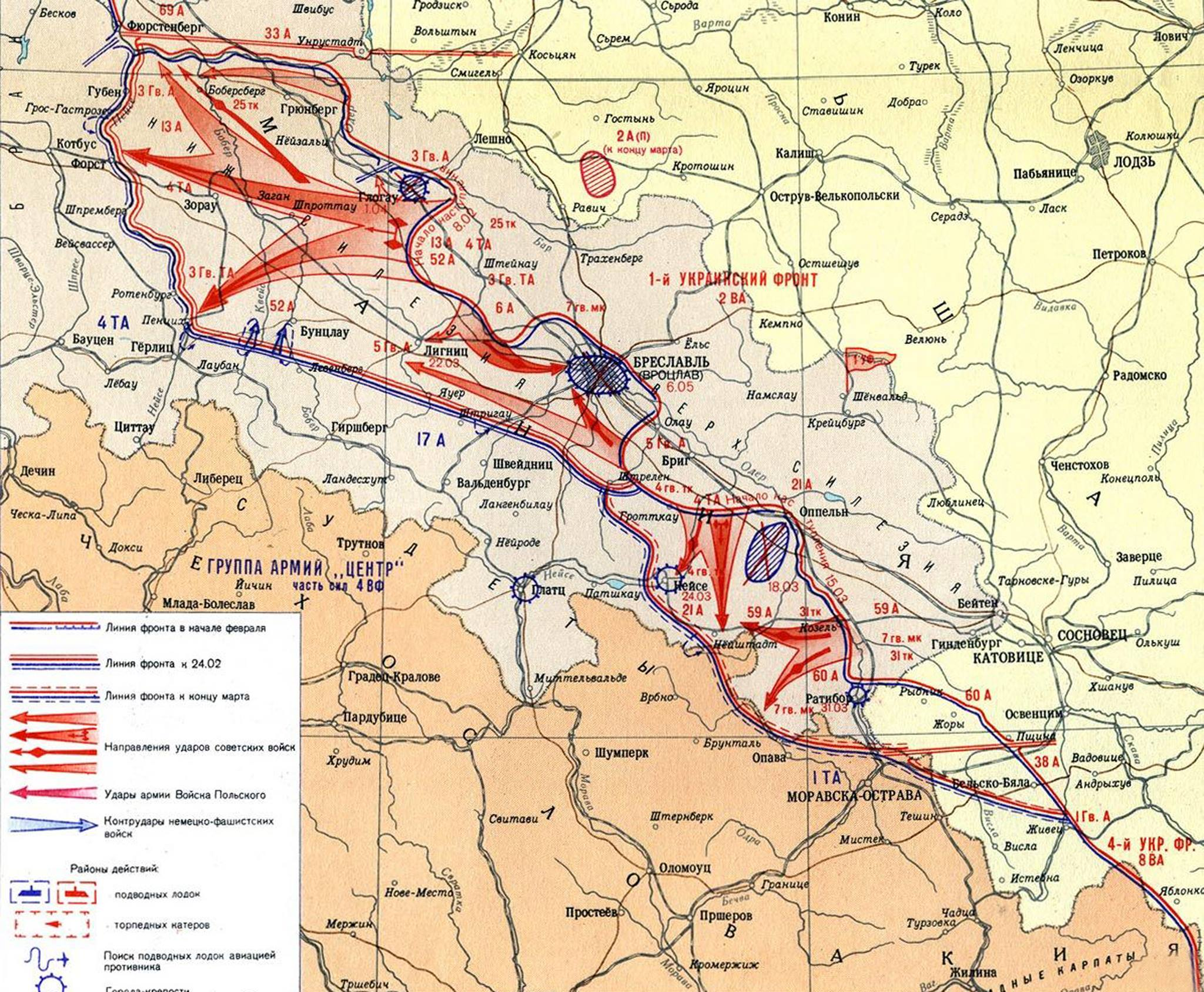
Silesian offensives

The Silesian offensives (Russian: Силезские наступления) were two separate offensives conducted in Silesia in February and March 1945 by the Soviet Red Army against the German Wehrmacht on the Eastern Front in World War II, to protect the flanks of the Red Army during its push to Berlin to prevent a Wehrmacht counterattack. It delayed the final push toward Berlin by 2 months.

== The offensives ==
The Lower Silesian offensive ran from 8–24 February 1945, and the Upper Silesian offensive from 15–31 March. Designed to flank the Soviet main advance on Berlin, the two operations pushed the Wehrmacht out of Silesia.

According to Soviet information, the Germans lost 54,000 soldiers: 40,000 dead and 14,000 captured in the Upper Silesian offensive.

The 1st Ukrainian Front under Ivan Konev’s command—having completed the Vistula–Oder offensive—was to advance westward toward Silesia with the primary objective of protecting the left flank of the 1st Belorussian Front, which was pushing toward Berlin. Similarly, the East Pomeranian offensive of the 2nd Belorussian Front in the north was tasked with protecting the 1st Belorussian Front's right flank.

== Delay ==
The need to secure the flanks delayed till April the Soviets' final push toward Berlin, which had originally been planned for February. By mid-April, the East Pomeranian offensive—carried out by the 2nd, and elements of the 1st, Belorussian Fronts—had succeeded in its objectives, reaching the important German port city of Stettin (now Szczecin).

== Motives ==
Joseph Stalin's decision to delay the push toward Berlin from February to April 1945 has been a subject of controversy among Soviet generals and military historians, with one side arguing that in February the Soviets had a chance of securing Berlin much faster and with far fewer losses, and the other arguing that the possibility of large German formations (remnants of the Czech fortification system) remaining on the flanks could have resulted in a successful German counterattack and further prolonged the war. Stalin's aim in delaying the advance on Berlin had likely been political, as it allowed him to occupy substantial parts of Austria in the Vienna offensive.

== See also ==
- Sandomierz–Silesian offensive
