= Ernst-Anton von Krosigk =

German WWII general (1898-1945)

- Born: 5 March 1898; Berlin, German Empire
- Died: 16 March 1945 (aged 47); Kanden, Reichskommissariat Ostland
- Military career
- Allegiance: German Empire; Weimar Republic; Nazi Germany
- Branch: German Army
- Service years: 1915–1945
- Rank: General der Infanterie
- Commands: 1st Infantry Division; XVI Army Corps; 16th Army
- Conflicts: World War I; World War II; Battle of France; Lvov–Sandomierz Offensive; Courland Pocket (KIA)
- Awards: Knight's Cross of the Iron Cross with Oak Leaves

Ernst-Anton von Krosigk (5 March 1898 – 16 March 1945) was a German general in the Wehrmacht during World War II who commanded the 16th Army. He was a recipient of the Knight's Cross of the Iron Cross with Oak Leaves of Nazi Germany. Krosigk was killed in an air-attack by Soviet forces on 16 March 1945 in the Courland Pocket.

== Awards and decorations ==
- Iron Cross (1914) 2nd Class (25 September 1916) & 1st Class (12 September 1918)
- Clasp to the Iron Cross (1939) 2nd Class (20 May 1940) & 1st Class (19 June 1940)
- German Cross in Gold on 9 August 1942 as Oberst im Generalstab (in the General Staff) of the I. Armeekorps
- Knight's Cross of the Iron Cross with Oak Leaves
  - Knight's Cross on 12 February 1944 as Generalmajor and commander of 1. Infanterie Division
  - 827th Oak Leaves on 12 April 1945 (Posthumously) as General der Infanterie and commander of XVI.Armeekorps

Military offices
Preceded by Generalleutnant Martin Grase	Commander of 1. Infanterie-Division; 1 June 1943 – 30 June 1943	Succeeded by Oberst Hans-Joachim Baurmeister
Preceded by Oberst Hans-Joachim Baurmeister	Commander of 1. Infanterie-Division; 8 June 1944 – 30 September 1944	Succeeded by Generalleutnant Hans Schittnig
Preceded by General der Kavallerie Philipp Kleffel	Commander of XVI. Armeekorps; December 1944 – March 1945	Succeeded by Generalleutnant Gottfried Weber
Preceded by Generaloberst Carl Hilpert	Commander of 16. Armee; 10 March 1945 – 16 March 1945	Succeeded by General der Gebirgstruppe Friedrich-Jobst Volckamer von Kirchensittenbach
