= XVI Army Corps (Wehrmacht) =

XVI. Army Corps
- XVI. Armeekorps
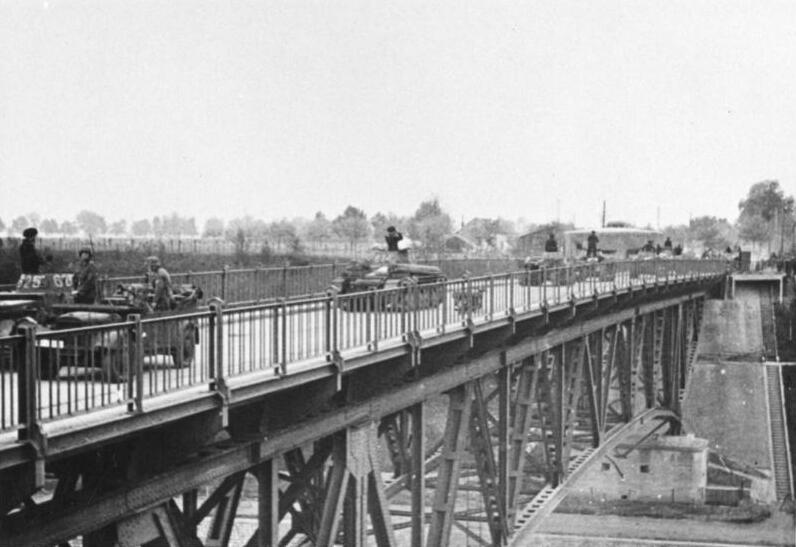
- Active: February 1938 – 17 February 1941; 30 October 1944 – 8 May 1945
- Disbanded: 8 May 1945
- Country: Nazi Germany
- Branch: Army

The XVI Army Corps (16th Corps) was a corps in the German Army during World War II.

The XVI (motorized) Corps (German: Generalkommando XVI. (mot.) Armeekorps) was activated as a headquarters for motorized units in February 1938 in Berlin. The XVI Corps was assigned to the 10th Army in the German invasion of Poland and to Army Group B during the invasion of France. During the French campaign, the corps fought at the battles of Hannut and Gembloux. On February 17, 1941, the corps headquarters was inactivated in order to form the 4th Panzer Group.

In July 1944, Generalkommando z.b.V. Kleffel was organized as an ad hoc corps headquarters subordinated to the 16th Army in northern Russia. On October 30, 1944, this headquarters was made permanent and designated the XVI Army Corps. As such, the corps remained under 16th Army command until the surrender of the 16th Army in Courland in May 1945.

== Area of operations ==
- XVI motorized Corps:
  - Poland - September 1939
  - Belgium and northern France - May to June 1940
- XVI Army Corps:
  - Northern Russia - 1944
  - Latvia (Courland) - 1945

== Commanders ==
- Generaloberst Erich Hoepner, February 1938 to February 1941
- General der Kavallerie Philipp Kleffel, July to October 1944
- Generalleutnant Horst von Mellenthin, October 1944 to November 1944
- General der Kavallerie Philipp Kleffel, November 1944 to December 1944
- General der Infanterie Ernst-Anton von Krosigk, December 1944 to March 1945
- Generalleutnant Gottfried Weber, March 1945 to May 1945

== Notes and sources ==
- Georg Tessin. Verbände und Truppen der deutschen Wehrmacht und Waffen-SS 1939-1945, Volume 4. Osnabrück: Biblio Verlag, 1975. ISBN 3-7648-1083-1.
