= XVII Army Corps (Wehrmacht) =

- XVII. Armeekorps
- Active: April 1938 – May 1945
- Country: Nazi Germany
- Branch: Army
- Size: Corps
- Engagements: World War II: Battle of France; Invasion of Poland; Operation Barbarossa; Odessa Offensive; Operation Bagration

XVII Army Corps (German: XVII. Armeekorps) was a corps in the German Army during World War II. The corps was formed in Vienna on 1 April 1938 after the Annexation of Austria.

== Invasion of Poland ==
At the beginning of the war in September 1939, the Corps, under the leadership of General Werner Kienitz, was assigned to the 14th Army in south Poland with the 44th and 45th Infantry Division. Together with the VIII Army Corps, XVII corps advanced from the Teschen area to the north of the Vistula via Pszczyna to Kraków. It then participated in the successful attack of the XVIII Corps on Lviv under General Eugen Beyer, which concluded the campaign.

== Battle of France ==
Between 11 and 13 November 1939, the Corps was transferred to France, and from January 1940 onwards it was placed under reserve in the 2nd Army. During the second phase of the Western campaign, XVII Corps was transferred in June 1940 to the 12th Army and deployed for the attack on the Aisne.

== Invasion of Russia ==
When Operation Barbarossa, the German invasion of the Soviet Union, commenced on 22 June 1941, XVII Corps, supplemented by the 56th and 62nd Divisions, was positioned on the Northern wing of the 6th Army. After advancing into Russian territory they were also allocated the 44th Division for the attack on Kiev. In collaboration with XXIX Corps Kiev was captured by 20 September 1941.

In the summer of 1942 the Corps participated in "Fall Blau" campaign as the left wing of the 6th Army. This was a campaign to strike south and capture Stalingrad and the oilfields of Baku.

In late 1943 and early in 1944 the corps was forced to retreat through Bessarabia in northern Romania and were then transferred to the Bukovina region as part of the 8th Army. Subsequently, XVII Corps, bolstered by the 8th Jäger Division and the 3rd Mountain Division, was positioned to defend passes through the Carpathian Mountains.

In late 1944, after the destruction of the 6th Army in the Jassy region, XVII corps had to undertake a fighting retreat to take up a defensive position in Hungary. In 1944 General Tiemann took command and the corps was made part of the Hungarian 1st Army. Sent to take up a defensive position in Silesia they were eventually overrun by the Soviet forces and made prisoners-of-war.

== Commanders ==
- Infantry General (General der Infanterie) Werner Kienitz 1 April 1939
- Colonel-general (Generaloberst) Karl-Adolf Hollidt 23 January 1942
- Colonel-general (Generaloberst) Karl Strecker 2 April 1942
- Colonel-general (Generaloberst) Karl-Adolf Hollidt 12 June 1942
- Infantry General (General der Infanterie) Dietrich von Choltitz 7 December 1942
- Infantry General (General der Infanterie) Wilhelm Schneckenburger 5 March 1943
- Cavalry General (General der Panzertruppe) Erich Brandenberger 1 August 1943
- Mountains General (General der Gebirgstruppe) Hans Kreysing 21 November 1943
- Infantry General (General der Infanterie) Franz Beyer 27 April 1944
- Mountains General (General der Gebirgstruppe) Hans Kreysing 25 May 1944
- Pioneer General (General der Pioniere) Otto Tiemann 28 December 1944

== Theatres of operation ==
- Poland: September 1939 – May 1940
- France: May 1940 – June 1941
- Eastern Front, southern sector: June 1941 – February 1945
- Hungary and Silesia: February 1945 – May 1945
