= Führerbegleitbrigade =

Military unit of Nazi Germany

Führer Escort Brigade
- Führerbegleitbrigade
- Standard for the "Führer Escort Battalion" (reverse)
- Active: 1939 – 30 April 1945
- Disbanded: 1945
- Country: Nazi Germany
- Branch: German Army
- Type: Armored
- Size: Brigade
- Patron: Adolf Hitler
- Engagements: World War II: 20 July plot; Battle of Berlin

Commanders
- Notable commanders: Erwin Rommel; Otto Ernst Remer

The Führerbegleitbrigade (also spelt Führer-Begleit-Brigade; abbreviated FBB; Führer escort brigade) was a German mechanized brigade and later an mechanized division (Führer-Begleit-Division), in World War II. It grew out of the original Führer-Begleit-Battalion formed in 1939 to escort and protect Adolf Hitler at the front. It was formed in November 1944 and destroyed in April 1945.

== The Führer-Begleit-Battalion (FBB), 1939–1940 ==
Before the 1 September 1939 attack on Poland, Adolf Hitler's personal military bodyguard came from two distinct, independent units based in Berlin: the Chancellery Guards, originally assigned by the army, and then the Leibstandarte SS Adolf Hitler (SS bodyguard regiment Adolf Hitler; LSSAH), which replaced the Chancellery Guards. When hostilities started, Hitler ordered the LSSAH to participate in the campaign against Poland, leaving him with no large military type of bodyguard formation (a small contingent of the Leibstandarte, remained stationed in Berlin).

By that time, an army infantry instructor, Erwin Rommel, came to Hitler's attention. Rommel was promoted to Generalmajor on 23 August 1939 and Hitler saw to it that Rommel was appointed in charge of a new battalion being organized to function as his personal escort to the front. This led to the formation of the FBB in 1939. It had the task of protecting Hitler's military headquarters and accompanying him when visiting battlefronts. It also was responsible for all luggage that travelled with Hitler and his staff. Prior to the invasion of France and the Low Countries, Rommel left the FBB to take command of the army's 7th Panzer Division.

== The Führerbegleitabteilung, Panzergrenadierdivision "Großdeutschland" ==
With the expansion of the elite Großdeutschland Infantry Regiment into a division on 3 March 1942, the number of subunits under its control was expanded. Among these subunits was a new Führerbegleit-unit, as well as another unit with Führer in its name, the Führergrenadierabteilung.. Although the new Führerbegleit-unit had practically the same purpose as the original and still-existing Führerbegleit battalion, and was approximately the same size, it was different from the FBB in that it was motorized. The newer unit was further distinguished by nomenclature: it was known as the Führerbegleitabteilung (FBA: Führer escort detachment). This is because battalion-sized Wehrmacht (and even Waffen-SS) ground units were designated according to class, with Abteilung for motorized, mechanized, armoured, or self-propelled battalion-sized units controlled by a battalion headquarters, and Bataillon for infantry units.

As a result of its transfer to the Großdeutschland (GD) division, the detachment—by now incorporating a heavy battery from Flak-Regiment "Hermann Göring", First Paratroop Panzer Division Hermann Göring—was moved to the eastern front, with headquarters in Hitler's Wolfschanze. Parts of the GD were used to expand the FBA until it eventually served as GD's replacement and reserve battalion.

The FBA saw action along with the rest of Großdeutschland Panzer-Grenadier-Division in its campaigns on the eastern front. Although not permanently attached to the division and composed mainly of an ad hoc collections of several units, the FBA and its successors would retain the traditional helmet insignia of its parent division, and when sub-units of the Großdeutschland division were being expanded to bring GD to corps strength (Panzerkorps Großdeutschland), the FBA was enhanced to brigade strength as well.

While the FBA was being refitted for service on the eastern front, Hitler ordered it to head west in 1944, along with most of its vehicles and personnel, to prepare for the Ardennes counter-offensive, for which it would be expanded into a brigade.

== Führerbegleitbrigade ==
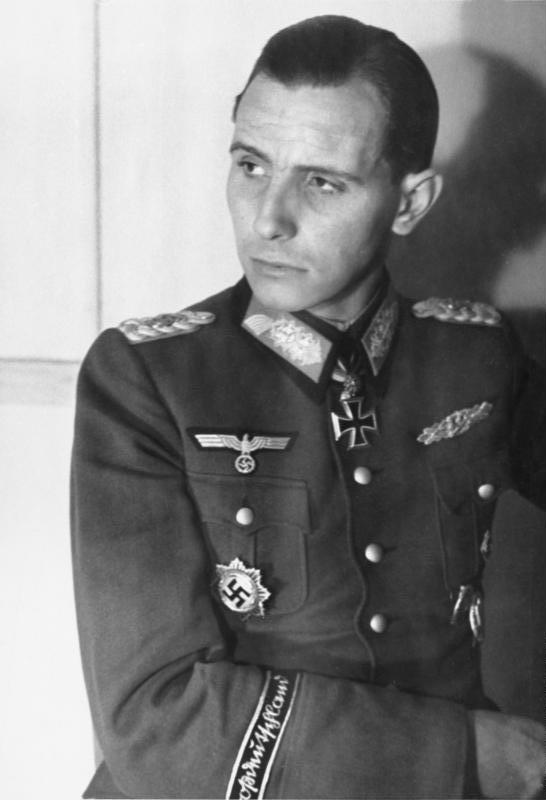
Otto Ernst Remer in 1945

Radically upgraded for the Ardennes Offensive ("Operation Wacht am Rhein") to provide General der Panzertruppe Hasso von Manteuffel's Fifth Panzer Army with additional firepower, the Führerbegleitbrigade was formed from elements of the FBA, Panzerkorps Großdeutschland, Hitler's personal army guard detail, and the mobile artillery from Hitler's Wolfschanze headquarters. This unit was placed under the command of Oberst (colonel) Otto Remer as a reward for his successfully foiling of a critical part of the 20 July 1944 assassination attempt of Hitler and attempted military coup against the Nazi leadership in Berlin.

The new FBB was essentially a restructured tank brigade, with units created from whatever excess personnel were available. Its combat strength included long-barrelled Panzer IVs and the turretless assault guns of the Sturmgeschütz-Abteilung 200, two organic Panzergrenadier (mechanized infantry) battalions, the 928th Bicyclist Battalion, and a self-propelled artillery battalion with 105-millimeter Wespe and 150-millimeter Hummel artillery pieces.

Committed to the front on 18 December 1944 as part of Fifth Panzer Army's XLVII. Panzerkorps, the FBB saw heavy action.

On 26 January 1945 the FBB was ordered to expand and form the Führerbegleitdivision.

== Führerbegleitdivision ==
When the Großdeutschland Division was expanded to Panzer Corps Großdeutschland, its subordinate units were expanded to bring GD to corps status.

As part of this drastic reorganization, the FBB was detached from army control, expanded by incorporating elements of the FGB and Panzergrenadier-Division Großdeutschland, and redesignated the Führer-Begleit-Division (FBD); at the same time, its sister formation, the Führergrenadierbrigade, was also upgraded to divisional status and renamed the Führer-Grenadier-Division (FGD). Both "Führer" divisions were put in the OKH (Oberkommando der Heere: the army high command), reserve until committed to the eastern front.

Commanded by Otto Remer, now a major general, the FBD and FGD served in local counterattacks and later assumed fire-brigade roles for attempts to prevent major Soviet breakthroughs.

The FBD and FGD were sent to the eastern front to help defend the Vistula front against massing Red Army forces during the Upper Silesian Offensive. It was trapped and finally destroyed in the Spremberg pocket in April 1945, the survivors surrendering to the Americans.

== Orders of battle ==
Führerbegleitabteilung, Panzergrenadierdivision Großdeutschland (1941)

Führerbegleitbrigade, Operation Wacht-am-Rhein (December 1944)

Brigadestabskompanie (headquarters company)

- Stabszug (headquarters platoon) - Sd.Kfz. 251/1 armoured cars
- Aufklärungszug (reconnaissance platoon) - Armed with MP-40 and StG44
  - Sd.Kfz. 250/1 armoured cars
- Aufklärungszug (reconnaissance platoon) - as above
  - Volkswagen and Kübelwagen cars
- Flakzug (anti-aircraft platoon) - 3 x 37mm Flakpanzer IV Ostwind self-propelled flak vehicle

== See also ==
- SS-Begleitkommando des Führers
- Reichssicherheitsdienst
- Protective Services Battalion

== Bibliography ==
- Tessin, Georg (1980). Verbände und Truppen der deutschen Wehrmacht und Waffen–SS im Zweiten Weltkrieg 1939–1945 [Units and Troops of the German Military and Waffen-SS in the Second World War 1939–1945] (in German). Vol. 14: Die Landstreitkräfte: Namensverbände / Die Luftstreitkräfte (Fliegende Verbände) / Flakeinsatz im Reich 1943–1945 (Ground forces: Named units and formations / Air forces (Flying units and formations) / Anti–aircraft service in the Reich 1943–1945). Osnabrück: Biblio. ISBN 3-7648-1111-0.
