= Horst von Mellenthin =

German general (1898–1977)

- Born: 31 July 1898; Hanover, German Empire
- Died: 8 January 1977 (aged 78); Wiesbaden, West Germany
- Relatives: Friedrich von Mellenthin (brother)
- Military career
- Allegiance: German Empire; Weimar Republic; Nazi Germany
- Branch: German Army
- Service years: 1915–1945
- Rank: General der Artillerie
- Commands: 23rd Infantry Division; 93rd Infantry Division; 205th Infantry Division; XVI Army Corps; XXXVIII Army Corps; XI Army Corps; VIII Army Corps
- Conflicts: World War I; World War II; Siege of Leningrad; Baltic Offensive (1944); Courland Pocket; Upper Silesian Offensive
- Awards: Knight's Cross of the Iron Cross with Oak Leaves

Horst von Mellenthin (31 July 1898 – 8 January 1977) was a German general during World War II who commanded several corps. He was a recipient of the Knight's Cross of the Iron Cross with Oak Leaves of Nazi Germany. Mellenthin surrendered to the Americans at the end of war, and was interned until 1948. After his release, he joined the Gehlen Organization.

== Awards and decorations ==
- Iron Cross (1914) 2nd Class (22 August 1915) & 1st Class (29 May 1917)
- Clasp to the Iron Cross (1939) 2nd Class (15 July 1943) & 1st Class (26 July 1943)
- German Cross in Gold on 25 March 1944 as Generalmajor and commander of the 205. Infanterie-Division
- Knight's Cross of the Iron Cross with Oak Leaves
  - Knight's Cross on 10 October 1944 as Generalleutnant and commander of the 205. Infanterie-Division
  - Oak Leaves on 4 April 1945 as Generalleutnant and commander of the 205. Infanterie-Division

Military offices
Preceded by Generalmajor Friedrich von Schellwitz	Commander of 23. Infanterie-Division; August 1943 – 1 September 1943	Succeeded by Generalleutnant Paul Gurran
Preceded by General der Pioniere Otto Tiemann	Commander of 93. Infanterie-Division; 1 September 1943 – 1 October 1943	Succeeded by Generalleutnant Karl Löwrick
Preceded by Generalmajor Ernst Michael	Commander of 205. Infanterie-Division; 1 December 1943 – 20 November 1944	Succeeded by Generalmajor Ernst Biehler
Preceded by General der Kavallerie Philipp Kleffel	Commanding General of the XVI. Armeekorps; October 1944 – November 1944	Succeeded by General der Kavallerie Philipp Kleffel
Preceded by General der Artillerie Kurt Herzog	Commanding General of the XXXVIII. Panzerkorps; 8 January 1945 – 15 March 1945	Succeeded by Unknown
Preceded by General der Infanterie Rudolf von Bünau	Commanding General of the XI. Armeekorps; 16 March 1945 – 20 March 1945	Succeeded by General der Infanterie Rudolf von Bünau
Preceded by General der Infanterie Friedrich Wiese	Commanding General of the VIII. Armeekorps; 20 April 1945 – 8 May 1945	Succeeded by None
