= Rudolf von Bünau (father) =

German general (1890–1962)

- Born: 19 August 1890; Stuttgart, Kingdom of Württemberg, German Empire
- Died: 14 January 1962 (aged 71); Kirchheim unter Teck, Baden-Württemberg, West Germany
- Relatives: ∞ 28 February 1914 Katharina "Käte" Lauffer (1893–1975); 2 sons: Rudolf von Bünau (son; † 1943); Günther von Bünau (son; † 1943)
- Military career
- Allegiance: German Empire; Weimar Republic; Nazi Germany
- Branch: Royal Württemberg Army; Imperial German Army; Reichsheer; German Army
- Service years: 1909–1945
- Rank: General der Infanterie
- Commands: 177. Infanterie-Division; 73rd Infantry Division; XLVII Panzer Corps; LII Army Corps; XI Army Corps
- Conflicts: World War I; World War II; Annexation of the Sudetenland; Invasion of Poland; Battle of France; Siege of Sevastopol; Battle of the Caucasus; Kuban bridgehead; Lower Dnieper Offensive; Dnieper–Carpathian Offensive; Lvov–Sandomierz Offensive; Battle of the Dukla Pass; Upper Silesian Offensive; Vienna Offensive
- Awards: Knight's Cross of the Iron Cross with Oak Leaves

Rudolf von Bünau (19 August 1890 – 14 January 1962) was a German general in the Wehrmacht during World War II who commanded several corps. He was a recipient of the Knight's Cross of the Iron Cross with Oak Leaves of Nazi Germany. His son, also named Rudolf von Bünau, was awarded the Knight's Cross of the Iron Cross on 8 August 1943; he was killed in action just one week later on 15 August 1943 south of Roslavl. His other son, Günther von Bünau was also killed in action in 1943. Rudolf von Bünau would survive the war. He was interned by the Americans until April 1947. Rudolf was killed in a car crash in 1962.

According to documents released by the Bundesnachrichtendienst in 2014, Rudolf von Bünau, led a "group staff" of the Schnez-Truppe, a German secret paramilitary force established by anti-communist Wehrmacht veterans in 1949.

== Promotions ==
- 15 July 1909 Fahnenjunker (Officer Candidate)
- 15 December 1909 Fahnenjunker-Unteroffizier (Officer Candidate with Corporal/NCO/Junior Sergeant rank)
- 22 March 1910 Fähnrich (Officer Cadet)
- 16 November 1910 Leutnant (2nd Lieutenant) with Patent from 20 November 1908
- 22 March 1915 Oberleutnant (1st Lieutenant)
- 22 March 1918 Hauptmann (Captain)
  - 1 July 1922 received Reichswehr Rank Seniority (RDA) from 22 March 1918 (5)
- 1 February 1931 Major (33)
- 1 July 1934 Oberstleutnant (Lieutenant Colonel) with RDA from 1 July 1934 (9)
- 2 August 1936 Oberst (Colonel) with effect and RDA from 1 August 1936 (27)
- 17 August 1940 Generalmajor (Major General) with effect and RDA from 1 September 1940 (2)
- 15 August 1942 Generalleutnant (Lieutenant General) with effect and RDA from 1 September 1942 (1)
- 20 April 1944 General der Infanterie (General of the Infantry) with effect and RDA from 1 May 1944 (2)

== Awards and decorations ==
- Iron Cross (1914), 2nd and 1st Class
  - 2nd Class on 9 September 1914
  - 1st Class on 14 November 1914
- Military Merit Order (Württemberg), Knight's Cross (WMV3/WM3) on 24 December 1914
- Friedrich Order, Knight 1st Class with Swords (WF3aX) on 15 June 1918
- Knight of the Order of Saint John (Bailiwick of Brandenburg)
  - Honorary Knight of the Order on 15 July 1925
  - Knight of Justice of the Order on 8 February 1950
  - Commander of the Order in 1952
- Honour Cross of the World War 1914/1918 with Swords on 15 January 1935
- Wehrmacht Long Service Award, 4th to 1st Class (25-year Service Cross) on 2 October 1936
- Hungarian World War Commemorative Medal with Swords on 4 May 1937
- Austrian War Commemorative Medal with Swords on 31 May 1937
- Repetition Clasp 1939 to the Iron Cross 1914, 2nd and 1st Class
  - 2nd Class on 1 October 1939
  - 1st Class on 5 October 1939
- Sudetenland Medal on 1 November 1939
- Winter Battle in the East 1941–42 Medal on 1 August 1942
- Crimea Shield on 15 September 1942
- Crusade Against Communism Medal on 19 March 1943
- Order of Michael the Brave, 3rd Class on 19 March 1943
- Hungarian Order of Merit, Commander's Cross on the war ribbon with Star on 12 July 1944
- Kuban Shield on 1 October 1944
- German Cross in Gold on 23 January 1943 as Generalleutnant and Commander of the 73. Infanterie-Division
- Knight's Cross of the Iron Cross with Oak Leaves
  - Knight's Cross on 15 August 1940 as Oberst and Commander of Infanterie-Regiment 133
  - 766th Oak Leaves on 5 March 1945 as General der Infanterie and Commander of XI. Armeekorps

== Writings ==
- Kriegsgeschichtlicher Bericht über die Kämpfe um und in Wien vom 29. März bis 16. April 1945 (Military history report on the fighting around and in Vienna from 29 March to 16 April 1945), 1954

== Sources ==
- German Federal Archives: BArch PERS 6/99 and PERS 6/299492

Military offices
Preceded by Generalleutnant Otto Ottenbacher	Commander of Division Nr. 177; 25 October 1940 – 1 June 1941	Succeeded by Generalleutnant Hermann von Gimborn
Preceded by General der Infanterie Bruno Bieler	Commander of 73. Infanterie-Division; 1 November 1941 – 1 February 1943	Succeeded by Generalmajor Johannes Nedtwig
Preceded by Generaloberst Erhard Raus	Commander of XXXXVII. Panzerkorps; 25 November 1943 – 31 December 1943	Succeeded by General der Panzertruppe Nikolaus von Vormann
Preceded by General der Infanterie Erich Buschenhagen	Commander of LII. Armeekorps; 1 February 1944 – 1 April 1944	Succeeded by General der Infanterie Erich Buschenhagen
Preceded by General der Artillerie Wilhelm Stemmermann	Commander of XI. Armeekorps; 20 March 1944 – 16 March 1945	Succeeded by General der Artillerie Horst von Mellenthin
Preceded by General der Artillerie Horst von Mellenthin	Commander of XI. Armeekorps; 20 March 1945 – 6 April 1945	Succeeded by General der Infanterie Friedrich Wiese
