= 16th Army (Wehrmacht) =

- German: 16. Armee
- Active: 22 October 1939 – 8 May 1945
- Country: Nazi Germany
- Branch: German army ( Wehrmacht)
- Size: Field army
- Engagements: World War II

The 16th Army (German: 16. Armee) was a World War II field army of the Wehrmacht.

== History ==
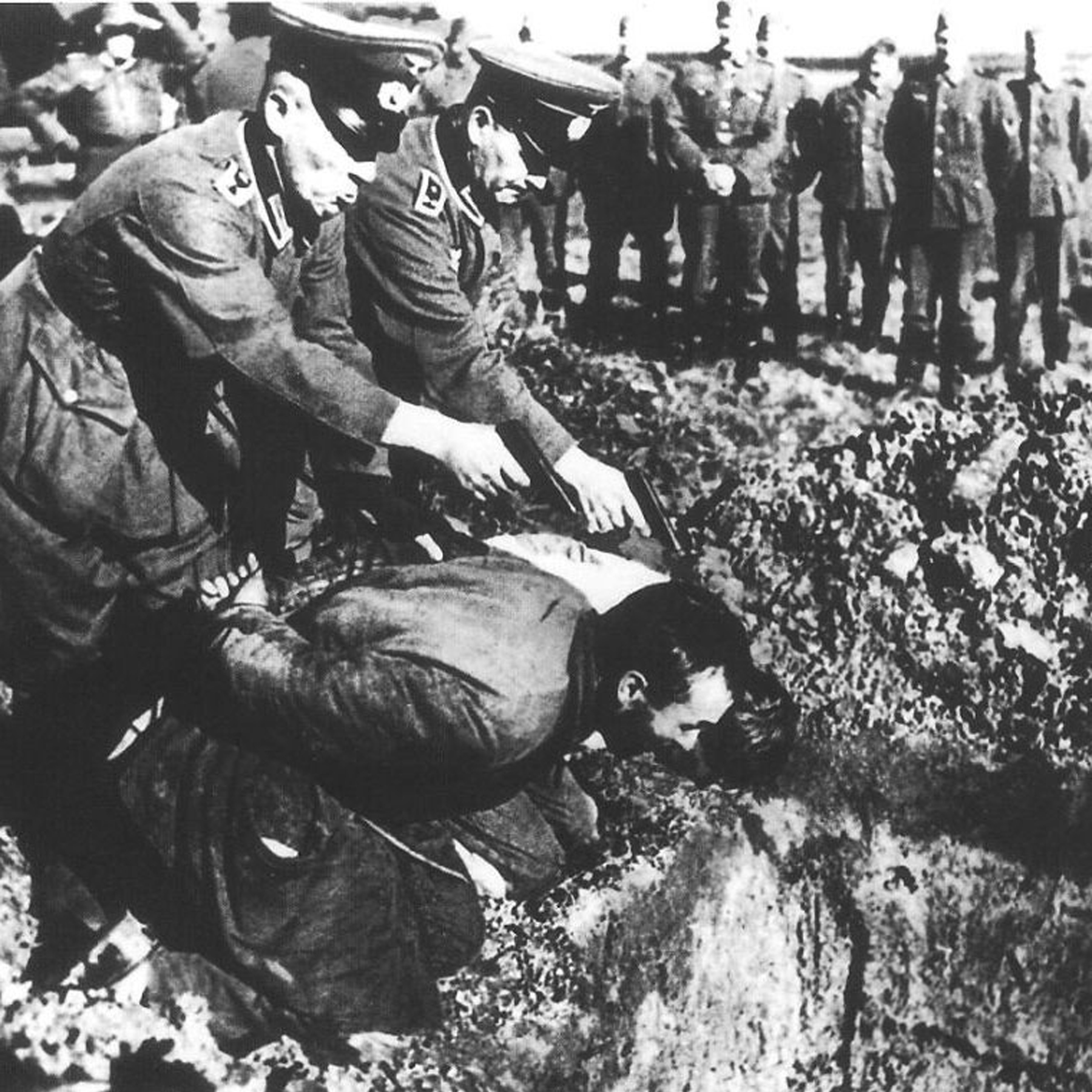
NCOs of one of the army's penal units executing civilians, 1943

It took part in the Battle of France. It was then deployed with Army Group North during Operation Barbarossa, the German invasion of the Soviet Union. It fought its way into northern Russia where in January 1942 part of it was encircled by the Soviets near Demyansk. Hitler forbade a withdrawal and the Army was re-supplied by air until a land corridor was opened in April 1942. It was subsequently involved in the Siege of Leningrad. The Soviets relieved Leningrad in January 1944.

On February 19, 1944, the Soviet 2nd Baltic Front launched a fresh set of attacks against the German 16th Army around Kholm. The Soviet 22nd Army made good progress in the initial assault. These attacks greatly diminished the 16th Army. It, along with the 18th Army was cut off in the Courland Peninsula when the Soviets launched their summer and autumn offensives of 1944. It stayed trapped there in the Courland Pocket as part of Army Group Courland until the end of the war. In May 1945 the remnants of the army, now reduced to corps strength, capitulated to the Red Army and were marched into captivity. The survivors were eventually repatriated in 1955.

== Commanders ==
No.	Portrait	Commander	Took office	Left office	Time in office
1	Ernst Busch	Generalfeldmarschall; Ernst Busch (1885–1945)	22 October 1939	11 October 1943	3 years, 354 days
2	Christian Hansen	General der Artillerie; Christian Hansen (1885–1972)	11 October 1943	1 July 1944	264 days
3	Paul Laux	General der Infanterie; Paul Laux (1887–1944)	2 July 1944	30 August 1944	59 days
4	Carl Hilpert	Generaloberst; Carl Hilpert (1888–1947)	3 September 1944	10 March 1945	188 days
5	Ernst-Anton von Krosigk	General der Infanterie; Ernst-Anton von Krosigk (1898–1945)	10 March 1945	16 March 1945 †	6 days
6	Friedrich-Jobst Volckamer von Kirchensittenbach	General der Gebirgstruppen; Friedrich-Jobst Volckamer von Kirchensittenbach (1894–1989)	17 March 1945	10 May 1945	54 days
