= 18th Army (Wehrmacht) =

- German: 18. Armee
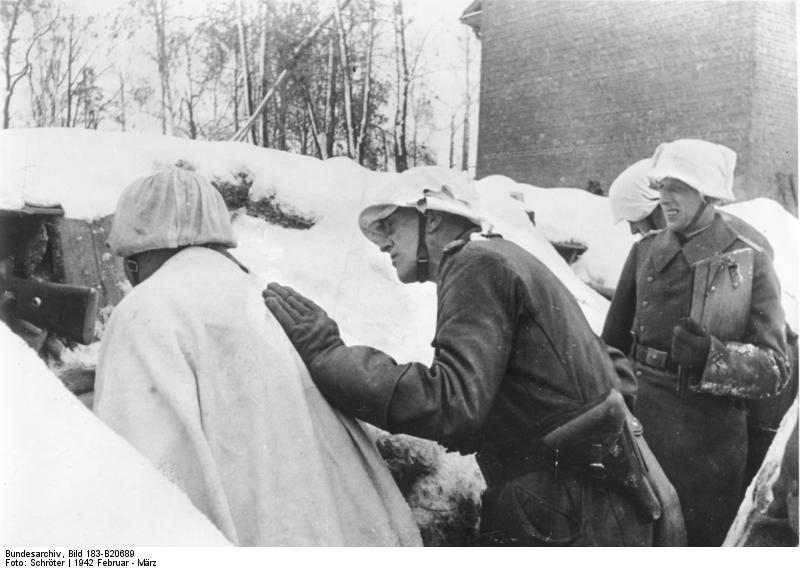
- Georg Lindemann visiting the trenches at Leningrad
- Active: 4 November 1939 – 8 May 1945
- Country: Nazi Germany
- Branch: German army ( Wehrmacht)
- Type: Field Army
- Size: Field army
- Engagements: World War II

The 18th Army (German: 18. Armee) was a World War II field army in the German Wehrmacht.

Formed in November 1939 in Military Region (Wehrkreis) VI, the 18th Army was part of the offensive into the Netherlands (Battle of the Netherlands) and Belgium (Battle of Belgium) during Fall Gelb and later moved into France in 1940. The 18th Army was then moved East and participated in Operation Barbarossa in 1941.

The Army was a part of the Army Group North until early 1945, when it was subordinated to Army Group Kurland. In October 1944, the army was encircled by the Red Army offensives and spent the remainder of the war in the Courland Pocket.

== History ==
On 22 July 1940, the 18th Army consisted of XXVI Corps (161st and 271st Infantry Divisions), XXX Corps (76th and 258th Infantry Divisions), Higher Command XXXV (162nd and 292nd Infantry Divisions), III Corps (62nd and 75th Infantry Divisions), XVII Corps (297th and 298th Infantry Divisions) and Higher Command XXXIV (68th and 257th Infantry Divisions), as well as XXXXIV Corps and 291st Infantry Division as reserves and limited authority extended to Panzer Group Guderian with XXXX Corps and XVI Corps.

== Commanders ==
No.	Portrait	Commander	Took office	Left office	Time in office
1	Georg von Küchler	Generalfeldmarschall; Georg von Küchler (1881–1968)	5 November 1939	16 January 1942	2 years, 72 days
2	Georg Lindemann	Generaloberst; Georg Lindemann (1884–1963)	16 January 1942	29 March 1944	2 years, 73 days
3	Herbert Loch	General der Artillerie; Herbert Loch (1886–1976)	29 March 1944	2 September 1944	157 days
4	Ehrenfried-Oskar Boege	General der Infanterie; Ehrenfried-Oskar Boege (1889–1965)	5 September 1944	8 May 1945	245 days

Chiefs of the Generalstab

- 5 November 1939 – 10 December 1940 Generalmajor Erich Marcks
- 10 December 1940 – 19 January 1941 Generalmajor Wilhelm Hasse
- 19 January 1941 – 17 November 1942 Generalmajor Dr. Ing. h.c. Kurt Waeger
- 24 November 1942 – 1 December 1943 Generalmajor Hans Speth
- 1 December 1943 – 25 January 1945 Generalmajor Friedrich Foertsch
- 25 January 1945 – 5 March 1945 Oberst i.G. Wilhelm Hetzel
- 5 March 1945 – 10(!) May 1945 Generalmajor Ernst Merk

== Orders of Battle ==
=== 10 May 1940 ===
- XXVI Army Corps
  - 256th Infantry Division
  - 254th Infantry Division
  - SS "Der Führer" Regiment
- X Army Corps
  - SS "Adolf Hitler" Regiment
  - 227th Infantry Division
  - 207th Infantry Division
  - 1st Cavalry Division
- Direct control of Army Headquarters
  - SS "Verfügungstruppe" Division
  - 9th Panzer Division
  - 208th Infantry Division
  - 225th Infantry Division

=== 1 July 1941 ===
- XXXVIII Army Corps
  - 58th Infantry Division
  - 291st Infantry Division
- XXVI Army Corps
  - 1st Infantry Division
  - 61st Infantry Division
  - 217th Infantry Division
- I Army Corps
  - 11th Infantry Division
  - 21st Infantry Division

=== September 1941 ===
- L Army Corps
- LIV Army Corps
- XXVI Army Corps
- XXVIII Army Corps
- I Army Corps

=== 15 July 1944 ===
- XVIII Army Corps
  - 12th Luftwaffe Division
  - Kampfgruppe Hoefer
  - 21st Infantry Division
  - 30th Infantry Division
- XXXVIII Army Corps
  - 121st Infantry Division
  - 32nd Infantry Division
  - 21st Luftwaffe Division
  - 83rd Infantry Division
- L Army Corps
  - 218th Infantry Division
  - 19th Waffen Grenadier Division of the SS (2nd Latvian)
  - 126th Infantry Division
  - 93rd Infantry Division
  - 15th Waffen Grenadier Division of the SS (1st Latvian)
  - Kampfgruppe Streckenbach
- Direct control of Army Headquarters
  - Headquarters VI SS Corps
  - 207th Security Division
  - 300th Division zbV (Estonian border guard units)

=== 12 April 1945 ===
- L Army Corps
  - 11th Infantry Division
  - 290th Infantry Division
- II Army Corps
  - 563rd Volksgrenadier Division
  - 126th Infantry Division
  - 263rd Infantry Division
  - 87th Infantry Division
- I Army Corps
  - 225th Infantry Division
  - 132nd Infantry Division
- X Army Corps
  - 30th Infantry Division
  - 121st Infantry Division
  - Kampfgruppe (Ernst) Gise
- Direct control of Army Headquarters
  - 52nd Security Division
  - 14th Panzer Division

== Literature ==
- Tessin, Georg (1970). "Die Landstreitkräfte 15—30". Verbände und Truppen der deutschen Wehrmacht und Waffen SS im Zweiten Weltkrieg 1939—1945 (in German). Vol. 4. Frankfurt/Main: E.S. Mittler. pp. 80–85.
