= Kurt Röpke =

German Army general (1896-1966)

- Born: 29 November 1896; Solingen, German Empire
- Died: 21 July 1966 (aged 69); Göttingen, West Germany
- Military career
- Allegiance: German Empire; Weimar Republic; Nazi Germany
- Branch: Imperial German Army; Reichswehr; Army (Wehrmacht)
- Service years: 1914–1945
- Rank: General of Infantry
- Commands: 320th Infantry Division; 46th Infantry Division; XXIX Army Corps
- Conflicts: World War I World War II
- Awards: Knight's Cross of the Iron Cross with Oak Leaves; German Cross in gold

Kurt Röpke (29 November 1896 – 21 July 1966) was a German general during World War II who commanded several divisions. He was a recipient of the Knight's Cross of the Iron Cross with Oak Leaves of Nazi Germany.

Röpke was born at Solingen in 1896. He entered the Royal Prussian Army in 1914 and fought in World War I. At the end of the war, he was an Oberleutnant in the 57th Infantry Regiment. He remained in the peacetime Reichswehr as a career officer. He was a battalion commander from 1938 to 1939, and then was posted as the commander of instruction staff 2 at the Infantry School. In World War II, he commanded Infantry Regiment 50 until September 1942. After another tour at the Infantry School, he led the formation staff for the 320th Infantry Division. Röpke was given command of the 46th Infantry Division from August 1943 to July 1944. In September 1944, he was elevated to corps-level command with XXIX Army Corps, which he led until the final month of the war.

== Awards and decorations ==
- Iron Cross (1914) 2nd class and 1st class
- Hanseatic Cross of Hamburg
- War Merit Cross (Lippe)
- Wound Badge in black
- Honour Cross of the World War 1914/1918
- Clasp to the Iron Cross (1939) 2nd class (3 July 1941) & 1st class (18 July 1941)
- German Cross in gold on 9 October 1942 as Oberst in 50th Infantry Regiment
- Knight's Cross of the Iron Cross with Oak Leaves
  - Knight's Cross on 18 November 1943 as Generalmajor and commander of 46th Infantry Division
  - Oak Leaves on 14 April 1945 as General of Infantry and commander of XXIX Army Corps

Military offices
Preceded by Generalleutnant Georg-Wilhelm Postel	Commander of 320th Infantry Division; 26 May 1943 – 20 August 1943	Succeeded by Generalleutnant Georg-Wilhelm Postel
Preceded by General of Infantry Arthur Hauffe	Commander of 46th Infantry Division; 20 August 1943 – 10 July 1944	Succeeded by Oberst Curt Ewrigmann
Preceded by General of Artillery Anton von Mauchenheim und Bechtolsheim	Commander of XXIX Army Corps; 1 September 1944 – April 1945	Succeeded by None
