= Georg-Wilhelm Postel =

German general

- Born: 25 April 1896; Zittau, German Empire
- Died: 20 September 1953 (aged 57); Shakhty, Soviet Union
- Military career
- Allegiance: German Empire; Weimar Republic; Nazi Germany
- Branch: Army (Wehrmacht)
- Service years: 1914–1945
- Rank: Generalleutnant
- Commands: 320th Infantry Division; XXX Army Corps
- Conflicts: World War I World War II
- Awards: Knight's Cross of the Iron Cross with Oak Leaves and Swords

Georg-Wilhelm Postel (25 April 1896 – 20 September 1953) was a German general during World War II. He was a recipient of the Knight's Cross of the Iron Cross with Oak Leaves and Swords of Nazi Germany.

Postel was taken prisoner by the Red Army on 30 August 1944 after the capitulation of Romania. Convicted as a war criminal in the Soviet Union, he was sentenced to 25 years of forced labour in 1949. Postel died in custody on 20 September 1953 of tuberculosis. He was interred in the prisoner of war cemetery in Shakhty.

== Awards ==
- Clasp to the Iron Cross (1939) 2nd Class (10 July 1941) & 1st Class (17 August 1941)
- German Cross in Gold on 28 February 1942 as Oberst in 364th Infantry Regiment
- Knight's Cross of the Iron Cross with Oak Leaves and Swords
  - Knight's Cross on 9 August 1942 as Oberst and commander of 364th Infantry Regiment
  - Oak Leaves on 28 March 1943 as Generalmajor and commander of the 320th Infantry Division
  - Swords on 26 March 1944 as Generalleutnant and commander of the 320th Infantry Division

Military offices
Preceded by Generalleutnant Karl Maderholz	Commander of 320th Infantry Division; 2 December 1942 – 26 May 1943	Succeeded by General der Infanterie Kurt Röpke
Preceded by General der Infanterie Kurt Röpke	Commander of 320th Infantry Division; 20 August 1943 – 10 July 1944	Succeeded by Generalmajor Otto Schell
Preceded by General der Artillerie Maximilian Fretter-Pico	Commander of XXX Army Corps; 16 July 1944 – 30 August 1944	Succeeded by Generalleutnant Friedrich-Wilhelm Neumann
