= Hans Boeckh-Behrens =

German general (1898–1955)

- Born: 27 November 1898; Wernigerode, German Empire
- Died: 13 February 1955 (aged 56); NKVD special camp No. 48, Soviet Union
- Military career
- Allegiance: German Empire; Weimar Republic; Nazi Germany
- Branch: Army (Wehrmacht)
- Service years: 1914–1945
- Rank: Generalleutnant
- Commands: 32nd Infantry Division; L Army Corps
- Conflicts: World War I World War II
- Awards: Knight's Cross of the Iron Cross

Hans Boeckh-Behrens (27 November 1898 – 13 February 1955) was a German general during World War II. He was a recipient of the Knight's Cross of the Iron Cross. Boeckh-Behrens surrendered to Soviet forces in May 1945 and died in captivity on 13 February 1955.

== Awards and decorations ==
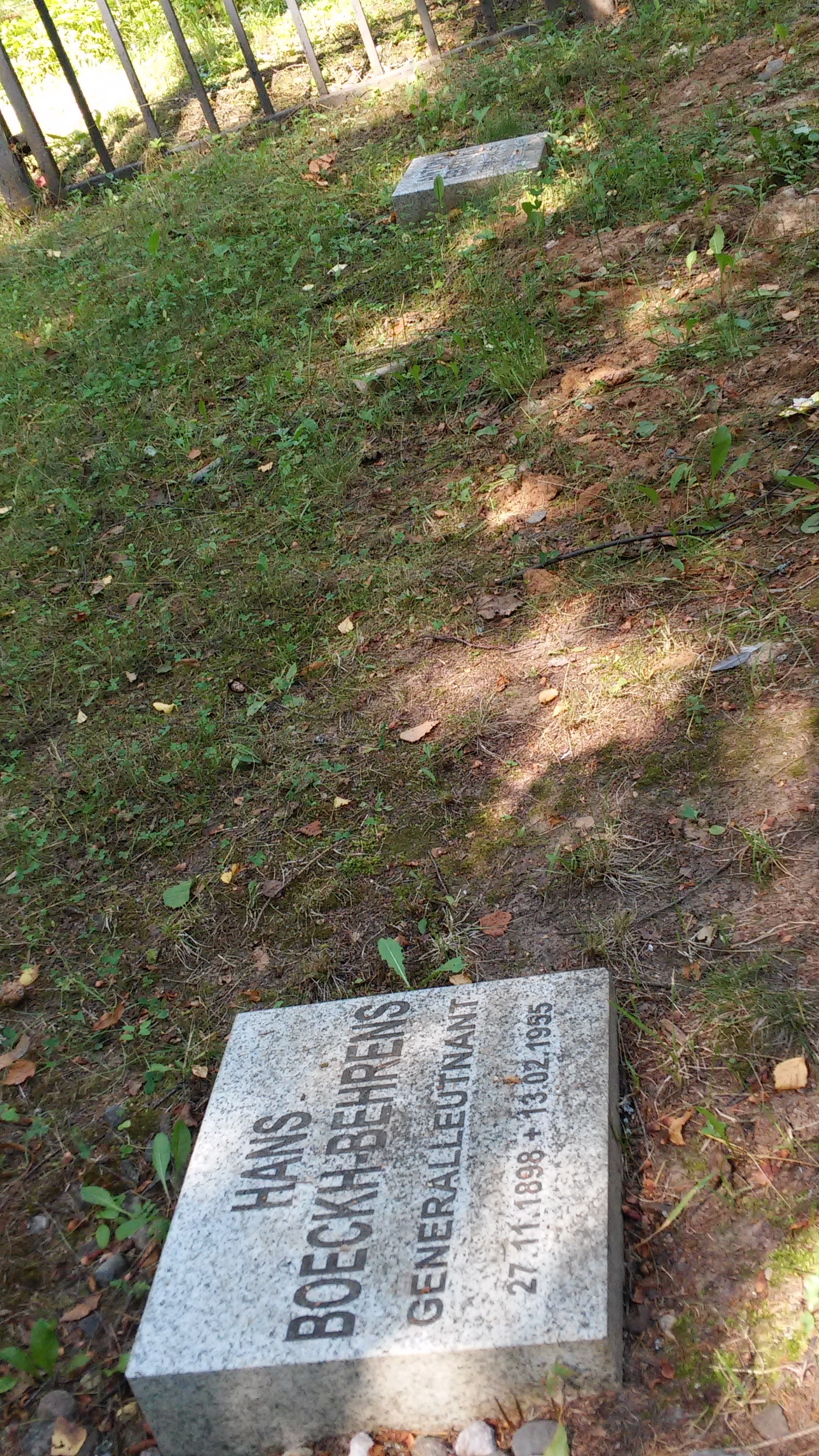

- Iron Cross (1914) 2nd Class (11 May 1915) and 1st Class (19 April 1916)
- Clasp to the Iron Cross (1939) 2nd Class (18 September 1939) and 1st Class (1 October 1939)
- German Cross in Gold on 30 January 1943 as Oberst im Generalstab in the AOK 16
- Knight's Cross of the Iron Cross on 9 December 1944 as Generalleutnant and commander of 32. Infanterie-Division

Military offices
Preceded by Generalleutnant Alfred Thielmann	Commander of 32. Infanterie-Division; 12 September 1943 – 1 February 1944	Succeeded by Generalmajor Franz Schlieper
Preceded by Generalmajor Franz Schlieper	Commander of 32. Infanterie-Division; 1 June 1944 – 13 August 1944	Succeeded by Generalmajor Georg Koßmala
Preceded by Generalmajor Georg Koßmala	Commander of 32. Infanterie-Division; 15 September 1944 – 8 May 1945	Succeeded by None
Preceded by General der Infanterie Wilhelm Wegener	Commander of L. Armeekorps; 24 September 1944 – 24 October 1944	Succeeded by General der Gebirgstruppe Friedrich-Jobst Volckamer von Kirchensittenbach
