= Philipp Kleffel =

WWII military general officer of Nazi Germany

- Born: 9 December 1887; Birkenfelde, Kreis Znin, Province of Posen, Kingdom of Prussia, German Empire
- Died: 10 October 1964 (aged 76); Coburg, Bavaria, West Germany
- Military career
- Allegiance: German Empire; Weimar Republic; Nazi Germany
- Branch: Imperial German Army; Prussian Army; Freikorps; Reichswehr; German Army
- Service years: 1905–1945
- Rank: General der Kavallerie
- Commands: 1st Infantry Division; L Army Corps; XVI Army Corps; XXX Army Corps; 25th Army
- Conflicts: World War I; World War II; Battle of Belgium; Battle of France; Operation Barbarossa; Siege of Leningrad; Siegfried Line Campaign; Liberation of Arnhem
- Awards: Knight's Cross of the Iron Cross

Philipp Kleffel (9 December 1887 – 10 October 1964) was a German general during World War II who commanded several corps. He was a recipient of the Knight's Cross of the Iron Cross of Nazi Germany.

For 10 days, Kleffel served as the last commander of the short-lived 25th Army in the Netherlands, until it was converted on 7 April 1945 to the Netherlands High Command (Oberbefehlshaber Niederlande), under Generaloberst Johannes Blaskowitz. Kleffell was part of the general staff when Blaskowitz surrendered OB Niederlande to I Canadian Corps' Lieutenant-General Charles Foulkes at Wageningen on 6 May 1945, effectively ending the war in the Netherlands.

== Awards and decorations ==
- Iron Cross (1914), 2nd and 1st Class
- Frederick August Cross (Oldenburg), 2nd and 1st Class
- Honour Cross of the World War 1914/1918 with Swords on 20 December 1934
- Wehrmacht Long Service Award, 4th to 1st Class for 25 years
  - 1st Class on 2 October 1936
- Repetition Clasp 1939 to the Iron Cross 1914, 2nd and 1st Class
  - 2nd Class on 28 May 1940
  - 1st Class on 24 June 1940
- Eastern Front Medal on 25 July 1942
- Order of the Cross of Liberty, 1st Class with Oak Leaves and Swords on 29 March 1943
- German Cross in Gold on 10 May 1943
- Spanisch Cruz de Guerra (War Cross) on 18 July 1943
- Knight's Cross of the Iron Cross on 16 February 1942 as Generalleutnant and commander of 1. Infanterie-Division

Military offices
Preceded by Generalleutnant Joachim von Kortzfleisch	Commander of 1. Infanterie-Division; 14 April 1940 - 12 July 1941	Succeeded by Generalmajor Dr. Friedrich Altrichter
Preceded by Generalmajor Dr. Friedrich Altrichter	Commander of 1. Infanterie-Division; 4 September 1941 - 16 January 1942	Succeeded by Generalleutnant Martin Grase
Preceded by General der Kavallerie Georg Lindemann	Commander of L. Armeekorps; 19 January 1942 - 3 March 1942	Succeeded by General der Infanterie Herbert von Böckmann
Preceded by General der Infanterie Herbert von Böckmann	Commander of L. Armeekorps; 20 July 1942 - 17 September 1943	Succeeded by General der Infanterie Wilhelm Wegener
Preceded by Generalleutnant Friedrich-Wilhelm Neumann	Commander of XXX. Armeekorps; 16 December 1944 - 25 April 1945	Succeeded by Generalleutnant Arnold Burmeister
Preceded by General der Infanterie Günther Blumentritt	Commander of 25. Armee; 28 March 1945 - 7 April 1945	Succeeded by None
