= Scherenberg =

Scherenberg is a German surname. Notable people with the surname include:

- Hans Scherenberg (1910–2000), German engineer and executive
- Rolf Scherenberg (1897–1961), German general
- Rudolf II von Scherenberg (c. 1401–1495), German bishop
