= 320th Infantry Division (Wehrmacht) =

- German: 320. Infanterie-Division
- Active: 2 December 1940 – May 1945
- Country: Nazi Germany
- Branch: Army
- Type: Infantry
- Size: Division
- Engagements: Battle of Izium; Operation Citadel; Battle of the Dnieper; Battle of Kirovograd; Odessa Offensive; Second Jassy–Kishinev Offensive

Commanders
- Notable commanders: Georg-Wilhelm Postel; Kurt Röpke; Ludwig Kirschner; Rolf Scherenberg

The 320th Infantry Division (German: 320. Infanterie-Division) was an infantry division of the German Wehrmacht. It existed from 1940 to 1944. In late 1944, the division was reassembled as the 320th Volksgrenadier Division.

== Operational history ==
=== Formation ===
The division was created on 2 December 1940 in Lübeck from parts of the 58th Infantry Division and 254th Infantry Division. It was part of the thirteenth Aufstellungswelle (wave of deployment), whereas its predecessor units had been part of the second wave in the case of the 58th and part of the fourth wave in case of the 254th. The 320th Infantry Division initially consisted of the Artillery Regiment 320 and the Infantry Regiments 585, 586 and 587. The division's initial commander was Karl Maderholz.

The divisional emblem was a red gateway with pointed roofs, an alternative emblem was a red heart on a red edged white circular background.

=== Duty in France ===
In May 1941, the division was sent to Dunkirk in occupied France. In June 1942, it was transferred to the Cotentin Peninsula.

=== Eastern Front ===
In January 1943, the 320th Infantry Division was called to service on the Eastern Front in response to the imminent defeat of the 6th Army in Stalingrad. Shortly before its departure, the divisional commander was replaced by Georg-Wilhelm Postel on 2 December 1942. The division was first sent to the Eastern Front's southern sector and saw first combat at Izium in early February, which was an intro to the Soviet defeat at the Third Battle of Kharkov. The 320th Infantry Division was used to stabilize the shattered Second Hungarian Army. In July 1943, the 320th Infantry Division fought in Operation Citadel, the last major German offensive on the Eastern Front. The unit had since 26 May 1943 been under the command of Kurt Röpke, but Röpke was replaced with Postel on 20 August 1943, which marked Postel's second term as divisional commander of the 320th Infantry Division. After Citadel, the division took part in the Wehrmacht's retreat westwards. In January 1944, the division was cited for its conduct at the Battle of Kirovograd, and continued to perform well in the fighting retreats across the Bug and Dnieper, including defensive actions at Krementschug during the Battle of the Dnieper. The division, now under the command of Otto Schell, was destroyed over the course of the month of August 1944 during the Soviet Second Jassy–Kishinev Offensive in Bessarabia. Its last day of operations was the 2 September 1944, when it was overrun by Soviet forces. Schell was killed in action during the division's last days of combat.

=== 320th Volksgrenadier Division ===
The 320th Infantry Division was formally disbanded on 9 October 1944 and reformed as the 320th Volksgrenadier Division on 27 October 1944. It absorbed the partially formed 588th Volksgrenadier Division and remnants of other shattered units. The new Volksgrenadier Division, commanded by Ludwig Kirschner, fought at Krakow in January 1945 and was battered. Reduced to the strength of a Kampfgruppe, it continued resistance against Red Army forces in Upper Silesia until it was trapped in the Deutsch-Brod cauldron and forced to surrender. Its final commander, after a brief tenure of a few days during February by Rolf Scherenberg, had been Emmanuel von Kiliani.

== Noteworthy individuals ==
- Karl Maderholz (divisional commander of the 320th Infantry Division (15 December 1940 – 2 December 1942)).
- Georg-Wilhelm Postel (divisional commander of the 320th Infantry Division, two terms of service (2 December 1942 – 26 May 1943, 20 August 1943 – 10 July 1944)).
- Kurt Röpke (divisional commander of the 320th Infantry Division (26 May 1943 – 20 August 1943)).
- Otto Schell (divisional commander of the 320th Infantry Division (10 July 1944 – 2 September 1944)), killed in action.
- Ludwig Kirschner (divisional commander of the 320th Volksgrenadier Division (1 November 1944 – 11 February 1945)).
- Rolf Scherenberg (divisional commander of the 320th Volksgrenadier Division (11 February 1945 – 19 February 1945)).
- Emmanuel von Kiliani (divisional commander of the 320th Volksgrenadier Division (from 19 February 1945)), last divisional commander before surrender.

== Resources ==
- "320. Infanterie-Division". German language article at www.lexikon-der-wehrmacht.de.
