= Günther Blumentritt =

WWII military officer for Nazi Germany

- Born: 10 February 1892; Munich, Kingdom of Bavaria, German Empire
- Died: 12 October 1967 (aged 75); Munich, Bavaria, West Germany
- Burial place: Munich Waldfriedhof
- Military career
- Allegiance: German Empire; Weimar Republic; Nazi Germany
- Branch: Prussian Army; Reichswehr; German Army
- Service years: 1911–1945
- Rank: General der Infanterie
- Commands: XII SS Corps; 25th Army; 1st Parachute Army; Heeresgruppe Blumentritt
- Conflicts: World War I World War II
- Awards: Knight's Cross of the Iron Cross with Oak Leaves

Signature
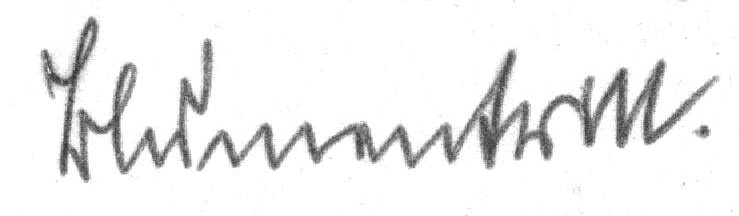

Günther Blumentritt (10 February 1892 – 12 October 1967) was an officer in World War I, who became a Staff Officer under the Weimar Republic and went on to serve as a general in the German Army during World War II. He served throughout the war, mostly on the Western Front, and mostly as a Staff Officer, though he was eventually given his own Corps and made a General der Infanterie. Blumentritt was instrumental in planning the 1939 German invasion of Poland and the 1940 invasion of France, he participated in Operation Barbarossa, and afterward commanded a major role for planning the defense of the Atlantic Wall and Normandy. After the war, Blumentritt gave an affidavit at the Nuremberg Trials, though he never testified in person, and then later helped in the rearmament of Germany during the Cold War and the development of the modern German army.

== Personal life and early career ==
=== Family and character ===
Born in Munich, Günther Alois Friedrich Blumentritt was the son of Günther Blumentritt (born 23 June 1859), town planner and a Privy Councilor in Munich and Lina Rückart (born 24 March 1868). In 1920 he married Mathilde Schollmeyer, and subsequently had two children with her; they remained married 47 years, until her death in 1967. Blumentritt was described as the opposite in many ways of his long-time commander Gerd von Rundstedt: Bavarian and Catholic, where von Rundstedt was Prussian and Protestant, swarthy and short whereas Rundstedt was tall and pale. Blumentritt was affable, friendly, and talkative, capable of great diplomacy, and in military terms, detail oriented—all of which made him an excellent staff officer, as well as a good complement to Rundstedt.

=== Early military career ===
He joined the Imperial German Army in 1911, in time to see action in the First World War, entering the 3rd Thuringian Infantry Regiment No. 71. as a Fahnenjunker. In 1912, he attended the Danzig Kriegsakademie (War Academy), and shortly afterward was promoted to leutnant (lieutenant). During the war, he served mostly on the Eastern Front in Prussia, after a brief contact with the French and Belgians at Namur in August, 1914. In August 1918, he was wounded in action and received the Wound Badge in black. By the end of the war he was an oberleutnant. He was conferred the command of his first regiment on 20 February 1919.

Blumentritt's experiences on the Eastern Front in the First World War gave him a great deal of respect for the Russian soldiers. He maintained this respect throughout his career, and regretted that many of his fellow officers, with less experience in the East, did not share it. He said of the Russians, "... in defense the Imperial Russian Army was stubborn and tenacious and they were masters at constructing defensive positions with great speed. The Russian soldier showed great skill in night operations and in forest fighting, and he preferred hand-to-hand combat. His physical needs were slight and his ability to stand up to punishment unshaken truly astounding."

Later, during the interwar period Blumentritt served as a company leader in the 3rd Thuringian Infantry Regiment No. 71 from 20 February 1919. After the military restrictions imposed by the Treaty of Versailles came into effect, he was briefly a member of the Freikorps (paramilitary organization) formed by the veterans of the 3rd Thuringian, before transferring back to the regular army with the 22nd Reichswehr Rifle Regiment on 1 October 1919. Then later he served as a staff officer in several positions, first as operations command officer from 1 April 1926 in the staff of the 6th Division. He was promoted to major in September, 1933, then worked as a lecturer and tactics instructor at the Kriegsakademie in 1935, and finally was promoted to oberst in October 1938. He eventually served as a staff officer under Wilhelm Ritter von Leeb, along with his friend Erich von Manstein.

== Second World War ==
=== German invasions ===
On 7 May 1939, Blumentritt submitted to his superiors a working plan for the German Invasion of Poland. At this time, he was assigned to the Oberkommando des Heeres (Army High Command; OKH), and formed along with Manstein and Generaloberst Gerd von Rundstedt a "Working Staff" for the development of a plan for the invasion. The plan he submitted was called Fall Weiss (Case White) and was subsequently put into action with little alteration. Then on 2 September 1939, Blumentritt was transferred to the general staff of Army Group South (one of the two German Army Groups to carry out the invasion) in Silesia under Rundstedt. This collaboration began his long and intimate friendship with Rundstedt, which was to last for many years. Blumentritt was Rundstedt's Chief of Operations, while Manstein was Chief of Staff. The invasion was put into motion, after some delays, on 1 September 1939, and by 6 October the entire country of Poland was subdued.

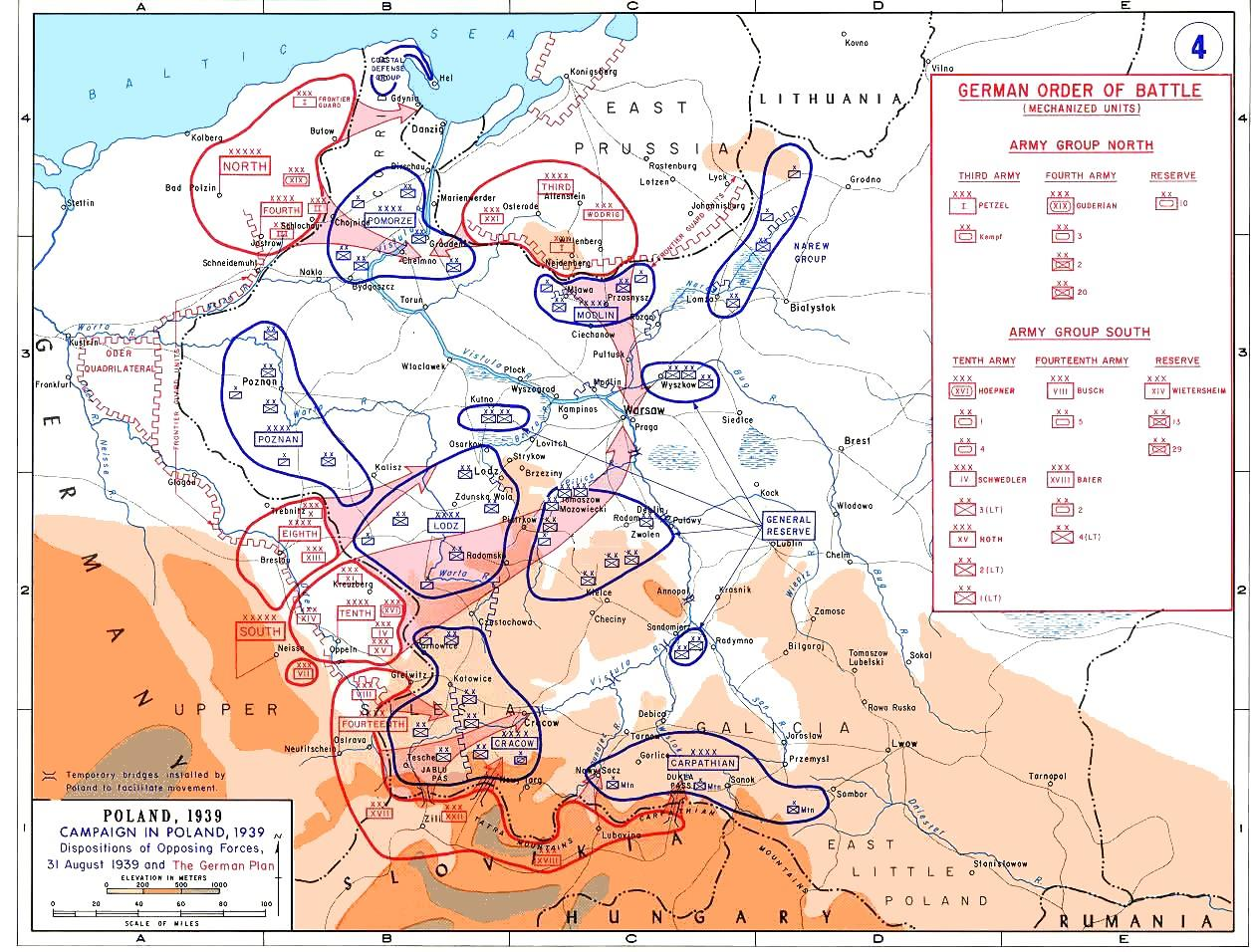
Fall Weiss.

In 1940, Blumentritt—as the Operations Officer of Army Group A (again under von Rundstedt)—took part in the planning (with von Manstein and Henning von Tresckow) and execution of the invasion of France. The plan he helped develop was called Sichelschnitt or "Sickle Cut", and was later referred to as the Manstein Plan. The subsequent unmitigated success of the German Blitzkrieg in France and the complete collapse of the French defense shocked even the Germans. However, as the German army closed in on complete victory, Blumentritt and Rundstedt ignored conflicting orders from the OKH to advance on the British and French position at Dunkirk, and instead followed Adolf Hitler′s order to halt for three days, consequently allowing the evacuation of the British Forces.

Immediately after the German occupation of France, Rundstedt, Blumentritt, and others were tasked with preparing for the invasion of Great Britain. This plan, as handed down from high command, was designated Operation Sea Lion. Blumentritt helped with the details of the plan, and several exercises were carried out in preparation for it, but he never believed that it was a serious option, or that Hitler intended to carry it out. He said that at the end of July or August "...Field-Marshal von Rundstedt was in Berlin, and Hitler stated quite clearly to him that he did not intend to carry out Sea Lion," and further, "By the end of September it was clear that the invasion of England was off."

In 1941, Blumentritt, under General Günther von Kluge, was made Chief of Staff of the 4th Army and promoted to general. Despite his initial opposition he later was involved in the planning and operation of the German invasion of the Soviet Union. On 18 April 1941, Blumentritt wrote:

Maybe the Russians really intend to stand and fight the Germans between the western border and the Dnieper, a move which would be desirable...Even the Imperial Army was no match for the German command, and the Russian commanders today are at an even greater disadvantage. The shortcomings of the middle ranks are even greater...The effects of German weapons, whose prestige has increased with the campaign against Yugoslavia, will soon be felt! There will be fourteen days of heavy fighting. Hopefully, by then we shall have made it.

In another memo, Blumentritt wrote:

On warfare and the inner value of the Russian opponent, the dull mass had two kinds of "ideas": the tsar and God. Today, there is neither. Bolshevism has taken their place. I consider that to be a weakness since I never believed that this idea means anything to the bulk of the Russian people. That is why I do not believe that the people will be carried away by Bolshevism. They will soon be indifferent and fatalistic.

Blumentritt's command was part of Army Group Center, which suffered massive casualties and the 4th Army itself only narrowly escaped envelopment and annihilation by the Russians outside Moscow. After the ultimate failure of Operation Barbarossa in January 1942, Blumentritt returned to Germany as Chief Quartermaster of the OKH. Late in the year he personally recommended to his superiors that the Germans should withdraw from Stalingrad, receiving the support of Chief of Staff OKH—General Franz Halder—in this recommendation, but the idea of any withdrawal was rejected by Hitler.

=== Normandy and the July Plot ===
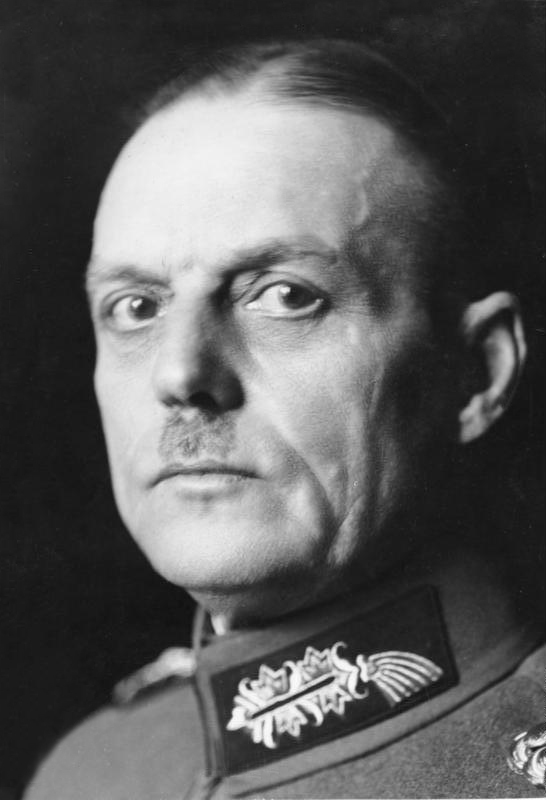
Gerd von Rundstedt, Blumentritt's commander for much of the war.

In September 1942, Blumentritt was made Chief of Staff to Rundstedt, overall commander of German forces in the west (OB West). In this capacity, he was responsible for much of the planning to defend France against Allied invasion, and in 1943 he sent a memo to the OKH expressing his concern about the depletion of German forces along the Atlantic Wall as the Eastern Front continued to bleed resources from the West. During the invasion of Normandy in 1944, he and his commander were taken by surprise at the location of the landings on the Cherbourg peninsula, later saying, "The disposition would more truly be described as ′coast protection′ rather than ′defense′! As we did not anticipate that any landing would be made on the west side of the Cherbourg peninsula, that sector was held very lightly—we even put Russian units there."

Rundstedt was relieved of his command by Hitler on 2 July 1944, after suggesting that Germany should surrender, and was replaced as OB West by Kluge. Blumentritt served as Chief of Staff under Kluge during the Anglo-Canadian offensive on Caen and the fighting in the Falaise Pocket. However, in July 1944, Blumentritt was implicated, along with Kluge, in the July 1944 conspiracy to kill Hitler; the plot failed, resulting in the arrest of many Army officers. Blumentritt himself was removed from his position (and Kluge committed suicide on 17 August), but he survived the purge because Hitler did not believe him guilty, and in fact later awarded him the Knight's Cross of the Iron Cross (Ritterkreuz des Eisernen Kreuzes) for his services.

Additionally, Blumentritt acted as a kind of ambassador between the SS and the Army in France after the coup attempt. Over 1,000 SS officers—including the head of the SS in France, Carl Oberg, and the head of the SS Security Service in Paris, Helmut Knochen—had been arrested by the German military commander in France, Carl-Heinrich von Stülpnagel, who was complicit in the plot. This presented a problem for the Army when it was revealed that Hitler was still alive and in charge. After a meeting in Paris, Blumentritt was able to work out a deal with Oberg and Knochen whereby relations were patched up between the Army and the SS, and the involvement of many of the conspirators in Paris was never discovered.

=== Combat command and German surrender ===
Shortly after the upheaval associated with the assassination attempt, Blumentritt returned to his position as Chief of Staff of OB West, first under Generalfeldmarshall Walter Model, then once again under Rundstedt when he was restored to command. However, he was soon transferred from his post as Chief of Staff to combat command. He was considered for LXXXVI Army Corps and for LVII Panzer Corps, then made commander of "Corps Group Blumentritt", consisting of the XII SS Armeekorps (176th Infantry Division and 183rd Volksgrenadier Division).

Under Model and then the restored Rundstedt, the German army fell back to the Siegfried Line. Corps Group Blumentritt held almost 22 mi (35 km) of front northwest of Loverich (now part of Baesweiler), through Geilenkirchen all the way to the Meuse. After the Allied victory just to the south in the Battle of the Bulge, they turned their attention north to Blumentritt's position. In Operation Blackcock, British forces drove Blumentritt's force from the salient of the Roer Triangle.

On 29 January 1945 (not long after the collapse of the Roer Triangle), Blumentritt was appointed commander of 25th Army in the Netherlands. All ground combat troops in the country, including naval and Luftwaffe troops, were subordinated to 25th Army, which was ordered to hold Holland as a "fortress" under all circumstances. Earlier, in the aftermath of the Allies' failed attack through Arnhem, Blumentritt had told Rundstedt he expected the Allied forces to bypass the Netherlands and cross the Rhine further south (an accurate prediction). This would cut off German forces in Holland. However, Hitler refused to evacuate these troops, which later fell into Allied hands without a major battle. It was also during this time that Blumentritt received the Oak Leaves (Eichenlaub) to the Knight's Cross of the Iron Cross. He was the 741st person to receive this award.

Later, the Germans were pushed back to the Ruhr. After the war, Blumentritt disagreed with the Allies' strategy in the west at this time, noting the precarious nature of the German position with only one armoured division against the twelve of the Allies. He stated that had Montgomery's Anglo-Canadian 21st Army Group been unleashed earlier for a concentrated armoured assault (as Montgomery had wished) rather than fighting on a broad front, "Such a breakthrough ... would have torn the weak German front to pieces and ended the war in the winter of 1944."

On 27 March 1945, Blumentritt briefly assumed command of the increasingly demoralized 1st Parachute Army. From 8 April to the end of the war, he commanded "Army Group Blumentritt", an ad-hoc collection of depleted units from Hameln on the Weser river to the Baltic Sea. He was tasked to delay the Anglo-Canadian advance into northern Germany, and he sought to keep the Baltic sea ports open as long as possible so that German refugees could escape from the Soviet advance in the east. On 2 May, after the death of Hitler on 30 April, Blumentritt ordered his men to cease resistance to the Allies and fall back gradually. A few days later, Blumentritt acted as a first emissary to Montgomery for the surrender of the German forces in the northwest.

== After the war ==
After capitulation on 5 May, Blumentritt and his command cooperated in demobilization, under orders from the British 2nd Army, and the taking of prisoners did not take place until 1 June. He was captured in Schleswig-Holstein and was placed in a British prisoner-of-war camp by 1 December, was interrogated by the International Military Tribunal for the Nuremberg Trials in 1946, and was then moved to a U.S. POW camp where he remained from 6 November 1947 until 1 January 1948. During this time as a POW, he assisted the U.S. Historical Division in Germany.

In the early 1950s, he was active in the development of the new Bundeswehr army, though this rearmament was a controversial move among the civilian population of Germany, who felt they had been victimized by World War II. He was used as a military adviser for the 1962 film The Longest Day, in which he was portrayed by actor Curd Jürgens. He died on October 12, 1967, in Munich. He published several books:

- Von Rundstedt, the soldier and the man, 1952
- Deutsches Soldatentum im europäischen Rahmen ("German Soldiering in a European Context"), 1952
- Strategie und Taktik : ein Beitrag zur Geschichte des Wehrwesens vom Altertum bis zur Gegenwart ("Strategy and Tactics: A Contribution to the History of Defense from Antiquity until Present"), 1960
- Schlacht um Moskau. Erinnerungen über die Heeresgruppe Mitte ("Battle of Moscow. Remembrances of Army Group Center"). (In: Seymour Freiden & William Richardson (editors): The Fatal Decisions. New York, 1958.)

== Awards and promotions ==
Promotions

- 20 September 1911 Fahnenjunker-Unteroffizier (Cadet)
- 27 January 1912 Fähnrich (Officer Candidate)
- 19 November 1912 Leutnant (Lieutenant)
- 22 March 1918 Oberleutnant (First Lieutenant)
- 1 April 1926 Hauptmann (Captain)
- 1 September 1933 Major
- 1 April 1936 Oberstleutnant (Lieutenant-Colonel)
- 1 October 1938 Oberst (Colonel)
- 16 January 1942 Generalmajor (Brigadier-General)
- 1 December 1942 Generalleutnant (Major-General)
- 1 April 1944 General der Infanterie (General of the Infantry)

Awards

- Iron Cross (1914)
  - 2nd Class (29 September 1914)
  - 1st Class (18 March 1916)
- Cross of Honor of Schwarzburg 3rd Class with swords on 3 January 1915
- Knight's Cross of the Royal House Order of Hohenzollern with swords on 7 July 1918
- Wound Badge in Black in August, 1918
- Clasp to the Iron Cross (1939)
  - 2nd Class (19 September 1939)
  - 1st Class (29 September 1939)
- German Cross in Gold on 26 January 1942 as Oberst im Generalstab (in the General Staff) of AOK 4
- Eastern Front Medal 1941/42 on 7 August 1942
- Knight's Cross of the Iron Cross with Oak Leaves
  - Knight's Cross on 13 September 1944 as General der Infanterie and chief of the general staff of the Heeresgruppe D
  - 741st Oak Leaves on 18 February 1945 as General der Infanterie and acting commander of the 25th Army

Military offices
Preceded by Generalleutnant Kurt Brennecke	Chief of Staff 4. Armee; 25 October 1940 – 10 January 1942	Succeeded by Oberst Julius von Bernuth
Preceded by General Friedrich Paulus	Oberquartiermeister I (Chief Quartermaster) OKH; 10 January 1942 – 24 September 1942	Succeeded by position abolished
Preceded by Generalmajor Kurt Zeitzler	Chief of Staff OB West; 24 September 1942 – 9 September 1944	Succeeded by Generalleutnant Siegfried Westphal
Preceded by SS-Obergruppenführer Karl-Maria Demelhuber	Commander XII. SS-Armeekorps; 20 October 1944 – 20 January 1945	Succeeded by Generalleutnant Fritz Bayerlein
Preceded by General Friedrich Christiansen	Commander of 25. Armee; 29 January 1945 – 28 March 1945	Succeeded by General Philipp Kleffel
Preceded by General Alfred Schlemm	Commander of 1. Fallschirm-Armee; 28 March 1945 – 10 April 1945	Succeeded by Generaloberst Kurt Student
Preceded by Heeresgruppe Student	Commander of Heeresgruppe Blumentritt; 10 April 1945 – 8 May 1945	Succeeded by surrender
