= Franz Schlieper =

- Born: 22 August 1905
- Died: 4 April 1974 (aged 68)
- Relatives: Fritz Schlieper (Brother)
- Military career
- Allegiance: Nazi Germany
- Branch: Army (Wehrmacht)
- Rank: Generalmajor
- Commands: 32nd Infantry Division; 73rd Infantry Division; 12th Luftwaffe Field Division
- Conflicts: World War II
- Awards: Knight's Cross of the Iron Cross

Franz Schlieper (22 August 1905 – 4 April 1974) was a general in the Wehrmacht of Nazi Germany during World War II. He was a recipient of the Knight's Cross of the Iron Cross. Schlieper surrendered to the Soviet forces in May 1945 and was held in the Soviet Union as a war criminal until 1955.

== Awards and decorations ==
- German Cross in Gold on 10 January 1944 as Oberst in Grenadier-Regiment 94
- Knight's Cross of the Iron Cross on 21 September 1944 as Oberst and commander of Grenadier-Brigade 1132

Military offices
Preceded by Generalleutnant Hans Boeckh-Behrens	Commander of 32. Infanterie-Division; 1 February 1944 – 1 June 1944	Succeeded by Generalleutnant Hans Boeckh-Behrens
Preceded by Generalmajor Kurt Haehling	Commander of 73. Infanterie-Division; 7 September 1944 – 10 April 1945	Succeeded by None
Preceded by Generalmajor Gottfried Weber	Commander of 12. Luftwaffen-Feld-Division; 10 April 1945 –8 May 1945	Succeeded by None
