= 12th Luftwaffe Field Division =

- 12. Luftwaffen-Feld-Division
- Active: 1942 – 1945
- Country: Nazi Germany
- Branch: Luftwaffe
- Type: Infantry
- Size: Division
- Engagements: World War II; Eastern Front; Siege of Leningrad; Riga Offensive (1944); Courland Pocket; East Pomeranian Offensive

The 12th Luftwaffe Field Division (German: 12. Luftwaffen-Feld-Division) was a major military organization of the Wehrmacht during the Second World War. The Luftwaffe Field Division was formed from Flieger-Regiment 12 at the end of 1942 and was assigned to Army Group North's 18th Army, XXVIII Army Corps in early 1943. It was sent to a Volkhov river sector, just south of the 61st Infantry Division and saw action near the Kirischi bridgehead and was partly responsible for stopping Soviet drives in the area Siege of Leningrad. In January 1944, it was listed as one of the stronger divisions in Army Group North, according to documents. It was scheduled as a 'Category III' formation that is capable of Full Defense. It made a fighting withdrawal to defend Luga and took heavy losses, listed as having 7424 men out of whom only 1481 were the actual bayonet strength. It had begun to withdraw with around 11,000 men. The division remained north of and defending Pskov until August 1944. During this time, it was almost constantly in action. In March 1944, it absorbed the remnants of the Felddivision 13 (L). During this time, its Jager regiments were reduced to two battalions. In May 1944, Army Group North stated in their daily war diary that only seven out of its thirty-two divisions were at 'full combat readiness'. Felddivision 12 (L) was considered 'one of the best divisions in the army group'. By September 1944, the German Divisions of Army Group North had been pushed back to Courland in Latvia Courland Pocket but still held the capital Riga. By 10 October, the German divisions in the Riga bridgehead had repulsed thirteen major assaults Riga Offensive. Withdrawn to replenish the division was placed on the islands of Hiumaa and Saaremaa in the Gulf of Riga. Where it defended against Red Army attempts to take the islands. Withdrawn from the islands, the division took its place defending Courland after the withdrawal from Riga. During this time, the strength of its regiments was reduced by 1 battalion each once more; although, it did absorb a Latvian security battalion to replace one in the 24th Regiment. After taking part in four of the battles for the Courland pocket, the division was withdrawn by ship to Danzig on 8 March 1945 and made part of the 2nd Army's XXIII Army Corps. It was employed there between Danzig and Zoppot and took part in the defence against the Soviets East Pomeranian Offensive until the end of March 1945, when it had been almost completely wiped out. A small group of men from the Division managed to make a fighting withdrawal through Loblau-Prangenau then via Zoppot to Gotenhafen. Where they boarded an evacuation ship on March 31, 1945, bound for Schlewswig-Holstein, they arrived in April 1945. Felddivision 12 (L) is considered as one of the two best Luftwaffe Field Divisions.

== Commanders ==
- Generalleutnant Herbert Kettner 14 December 1942 - 15 November 1943
- Generalmajor Gottfied Webber 15 November 1943 - 10 April 1945
- Generalleutnant Franz Schlieper 10 April 1945 - 8 May 1945

== Known division members ==
- Hanns Günther von Obernitz (1899–1944), was from 1933 to 1934 chief police officer of Nuremberg - Fürth and from 1939 to 1944 NSDAP member of the Reichstag.
- Oberstleutnant Wolfgang Kretschmar CO Jager Regiment 24 (L) March 1943 - 27 December 1944 -Awarded 600th Oak Leaves 30 September 1944, 121st Swords 12 January 1945 (Note: 'The 24th Luftwaffe Light Infantry Regiment under its excellent commander Kretzschmar, stood like a rock in the surf' The Luftwaffe soldiers gave no ground without exacting a price. Kretzschmar died a soldier's death with his weapon in his hand. For his courageous leadership and his bravery in combat, 'Oberst' Kretzschmar was posthumously awarded the Oakleaves and crossed swords to the knights cross on 12 January 1945.)
- Oberleutnant Gunter Ohme CO 4 Kompanie Luftwaffen-Panzer-Jager-Abteilung 12 - German Cross in Gold November 1943
- Oberleutnant Werner Stuhlick Luftwaffen-Panzer-Jager-Abteilung 12 - German Cross in Gold November 1943

== Notes ==
Footnotes

Citations
