= Georg Koßmala =

German general in World War II

- Born: 22 October 1896
- Died: 18 March 1945 (aged 48) Oberglogau
- Allegiance: Nazi Germany
- Branch: Army (Wehrmacht)
- Rank: Generalmajor
- Commands: 32d Infantry Division; 272nd Volksgrenadier-Division
- Conflicts: World War II
- Awards: Knight's Cross of the Iron Cross with Oak Leaves

Georg Koßmala (22 October 1896 – 18 March 1945) was a general in the Wehrmacht of Nazi Germany during World War II. He was a recipient of the Knight's Cross of the Iron Cross with Oak Leaves. Koßmala was killed on 18 March 1945 in Oberglogau in Upper Silesia.

== Awards and decorations ==
- Clasp to the Iron Cross (1939) 2nd Class (6 October 1939) & 1st Class (22 August 1941)
- Knight's Cross of the Iron Cross with Oak Leaves
  - Knight's Cross on 13 March 1942 as Oberst and commander of Sicherungs-Regiment 3
  - Oak Leaves on 26 March 1944 as Oberst and commander of Grenadier-Regiment 6

Military offices
Preceded by Generalleutnant Hans Boeckh-Behrens	Commander of 32. Infanterie-Division; 13 August 1944 - September 1944	Succeeded by Generalleutnant Hans Boeckh-Behrens
Preceded by ?	Commander of 272. Volksgrenadier-Division; 30 September 1944 - 13 December 1944	Succeeded by Generalleutnant Eugen König
Preceded by Generalmajor Rudolf Goltzsch	Commander of 344. Infanterie-Division; 16 December 1944 - 28 February 1945	Succeeded by Generalmajor Rolf Scherenberg
