= Wilhelm Wegener =

WW2 German Army general (1895-1944)

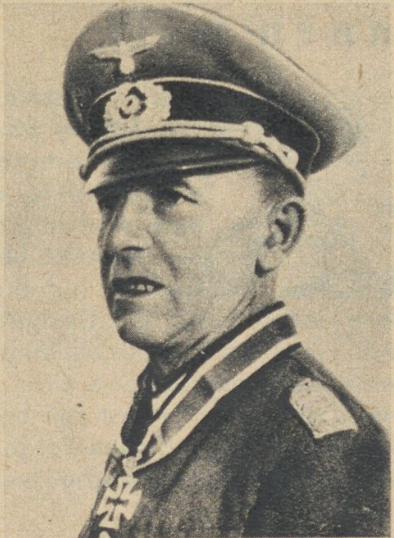
- Born: 29 April 1895
- Died: 24 September 1944 (aged 49)
- Military career
- Allegiance: Nazi Germany
- Branch: Army
- Rank: General of the Infantry
- Commands: 32. Infanterie-Division; L. Armeekorps
- Conflicts: World War II
- Awards: Knight's Cross of the Iron Cross with Oak Leaves and Swords

Wilhelm Wegener (29 April 1895 – 24 September 1944) was a German general of infantry, serving during World War II. He was also a recipient of the Knight's Cross of the Iron Cross with Oak Leaves and Swords. He was killed in action by the Soviet air attack aircraft on 24 September 1944. His demise was announced by Berlin radio on 26 September 1944, stating that he “met a hero’s death” on the Eastern Front.

== Awards ==
- Clasp to the Iron Cross (1939) 2nd Class (26 September 1939) & 1st Class (29 May 1940)
- Knight's Cross of the Iron Cross with Oak Leaves and Swords
  - Knight's Cross on 27 October 1941 as Oberst and commander of Infanterie-Regiment 94
  - 66th Oak Leaves on 19 January 1942 as Oberst and commander of Infanterie-Regiment 94
  - 97th Swords on 17 September 1944 as General der Infanterie and commanding general of the L. Armeekorps

Military offices
Preceded by Generalleutnant Karl Hernekamp	Commander of 32. Infanterie-Division; 1 June 1942 – 27 June 1943	Succeeded by Generalleutnant Alfred Thielmann
Preceded by General der Kavallerie Philipp Kleffel	Commander of L. Armeekorps; 12 September 1943 – 24 September 1944	Succeeded by Generalleutnant Hans Boeckh-Behrens
