= Felix Schwalbe =

German general and Knight's Cross recipient (1892–1974)

Eugen-Felix Schwalbe
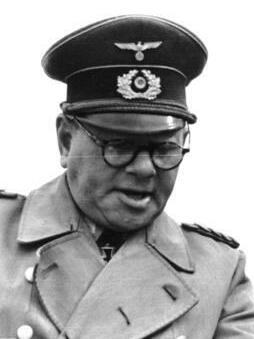
- Schwalbe in 1944
- Born: 25 March 1892
- Died: 12 June 1974 (aged 82)
- Military career
- Allegiance: German Empire; Weimar Republic; Nazi Germany
- Branch: German Army
- Service years: 1912–1945
- Rank: General der Infanterie
- Commands: 344th Infantry Division; 719th Infantry Division; LXVII Army Corps; LXXXVIII Army Corps
- Conflicts: World War I; World War II; Invasion of Poland; Battle of France; Operation Barbarossa; Battle of Smolensk (1941); Battle of Moscow; Operation Overlord; Falaise pocket; Operation Market Garden; Battle of the Scheldt; Operation Blackcock
- Awards: Knight's Cross of the Iron Cross

Eugen-Felix Schwalbe (25 March 1892 – 12 June 1974) was a general in the Wehrmacht of Nazi Germany during World War II. He was a recipient of the Knight's Cross of the Iron Cross.

== Awards and decorations ==
- German Cross in Silver on 30 October 1943 and in Gold on 7 December 1944
- Knight's Cross of the Iron Cross on 13 July 1940 as Oberst and commander of Infanterie-Regiment 461

Military offices
Preceded by None	Commander of 344. Infanterie-Division; 27 September 1942 – 30 September 1944	Succeeded by Generalmajor Erich Walther
Preceded by Generalleutnant Karl Sievers	Commander of 719. Infanterie-Division; 30 September 1944 – 22 December 1944	Succeeded by Generalmajor Heinrich Gäde
Preceded by General der Infanterie Carl Püchler	Commander of LXVII. Armeekorps; 1 December 1944 – 17 December 1944	Succeeded by General der Infanterie Otto Hitzfeld
Preceded by General der Infanterie Hans-Wolfgang Reinhard	Commander of LXXXVIII. Armeekorps; 22 December 1944 – 8 May 1945	Succeeded by None
