= Rolf Scherenberg =

German general during World War II

- Born: 27 May 1897; Berlin, German Empire
- Died: 10 June 1961 (aged 64); Villach, Austria
- Military career
- Allegiance: German Empire; Weimar Republic; Nazi Germany
- Branch: Army
- Service years: 1915–1920; 1934–1945
- Rank: Generalmajor
- Commands: 320th Infantry Division; 344. Infanterie-Division; 371. Infanterie-Division
- Conflicts: World War II: Upper Silesian Offensive (surrendered)
- Awards: Knight's Cross of the Iron Cross

Rolf Scherenberg (27 May 1897 – 10 June 1961) was a German general (Generalmajor) in the Wehrmacht during World War II. He was a recipient of the Knight's Cross of the Iron Cross of Nazi Germany.

Scherenberg surrendered to the Red Army in the course of the Soviet Upper Silesian Offensive in May 1945. Convicted as a war criminal in the Soviet Union, he was held until October 1955.

== Awards and decorations ==
- German Cross in Gold (19 December 1941)
- Knight's Cross of the Iron Cross on 26 March 1943 as Oberst and commander of Grenadier-Regiment 532

Military offices
Preceded by Generalmajor Ludwig Kirschner	Commander of 320. Volksgrenadier-Division; 14 February 1945 – 19 February 1945	Succeeded by Generalmajor Emmanuel von Kiliani
Preceded by Generalmajor Georg Koßmala	Commander of 344. Infanterie-Division; 28 February 1945 – 2 March 1945	Succeeded by Generalleutnant Erwin Jollasse
Preceded by General der Infanterie Hermann Niehoff	Commander of 371. Infanterie-Division; 2 March 1945 – 8 May 1945	Succeeded by None
