= 344th Infantry Division (Wehrmacht) =

- German: 344. Infanterie-Division
- Active: 25 September 1942 - 8 May 1945
- Country: Nazi Germany
- Branch: Army
- Type: Infantry
- Size: Division
- Engagements: World War II: Battle of Normandy; Battle of Hürtgen Forest; Upper Silesian offensive; Battle of Berlin

Commanders
- Notable commanders: Felix Schwalbe; Erwin Jollasse

The 344th Infantry Division, (German: 344. Infanterie-Division) was an infantry division of the German Army during World War II, active from 1942 to 1945 in two separate instances.

== History ==
The 344th Infantry Division was formed on 25 September 1942 in France from personnel from Wehrkreis V.

After her training, she was sent in November 1942 to the Bordeaux sector within LXXX. Armeekorps of the 1st Army in Heeresgruppe D. One of its regiments was the Indian Infanterie-Regiment 950. In August 1944, the Division was sent to Normandy, without the Infanterie-Regiment 950, where it suffered heavy losses and was disbanded.

In September 1944 a new 344th Infantry Division was formed which initially fought in the Hürtgen Forest. In the spring of 1945 it was sent to the Eastern Front.
Parts of the division defended the Oder between Krappitz and Cosel during the Upper Silesian offensive. After the 1st Ukrainian Front had broken through south of Cottbus in mid-April, Hitler demanded from the Jolasse Group that the 344th Infantry Division near Drebkau, the remnants of the Führerbegleitbrigade (Major General Otto Ernst Remer) and the remnants of the 10th SS Panzer Division Frundsberg near Spremberg, attacked northwards into the flank of the advancing 1st Ukrainian Front.
This ended in failure, and all German units were surrounded by Soviet troops in the Kausche Pocket and taken prisoner.

== Commanding officers ==
- General of the Infantry Felix Schwalbe : 27 September 1942 - 30 September 1944
- Generalmajor Erich Walther (30 September 1944)
- Generalmajor Rudolf Goltzsch : 30 September 1944 - 16 October 1944
- Generalmajor Eugen König : 5 November 1944 - 16 December 1944
- Generalmajor Georg Koßmala : 16 December 1944 - 28 February 1945
- Generalmajor Rolf Scherenberg : 28 February 1945 – 15 March 1945
- Generalleutnant Erwin Jollasse : 15 March 1945 - 8 May 1945

== Sources ==
- Lexikon der Wehrmacht
- Axis History
