= Georg Lindemann =

German general (1884–1963)

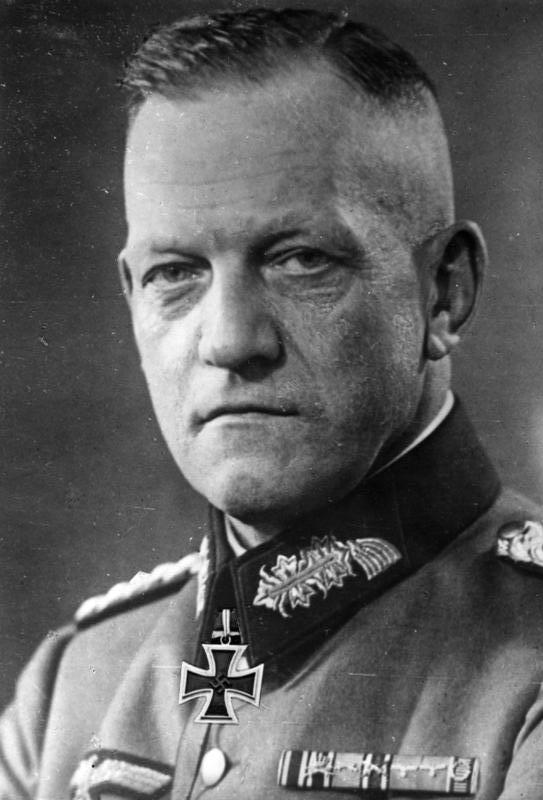
- Lindemann in 1940
- Born: 8 March 1884; Osterburg, German Empire
- Died: 25 September 1963 (aged 79); Freudenstadt, West Germany
- Relatives: Ernst Lindemann (cousin)
- Military career
- Allegiance: German Empire; Weimar Republic; Nazi Germany
- Branch: German Army
- Service years: 1903–1945
- Rank: Generaloberst
- Commands: 36th Infantry Division; L Army Corps; 18th Army; Army Group North
- Conflicts: World War I World War II
- Awards: Knight's Cross of the Iron Cross with Oak Leaves

Georg Lindemann (8 March 1884 – 25 September 1963) was a German general during World War II. He commanded a division in Poland and France, a corps in the Balkans and Russia, 18th Army outside Leningrad, and later Army Group North. His cousin Ernst Lindemann was captain of the battleship Bismarck.

== World War II ==
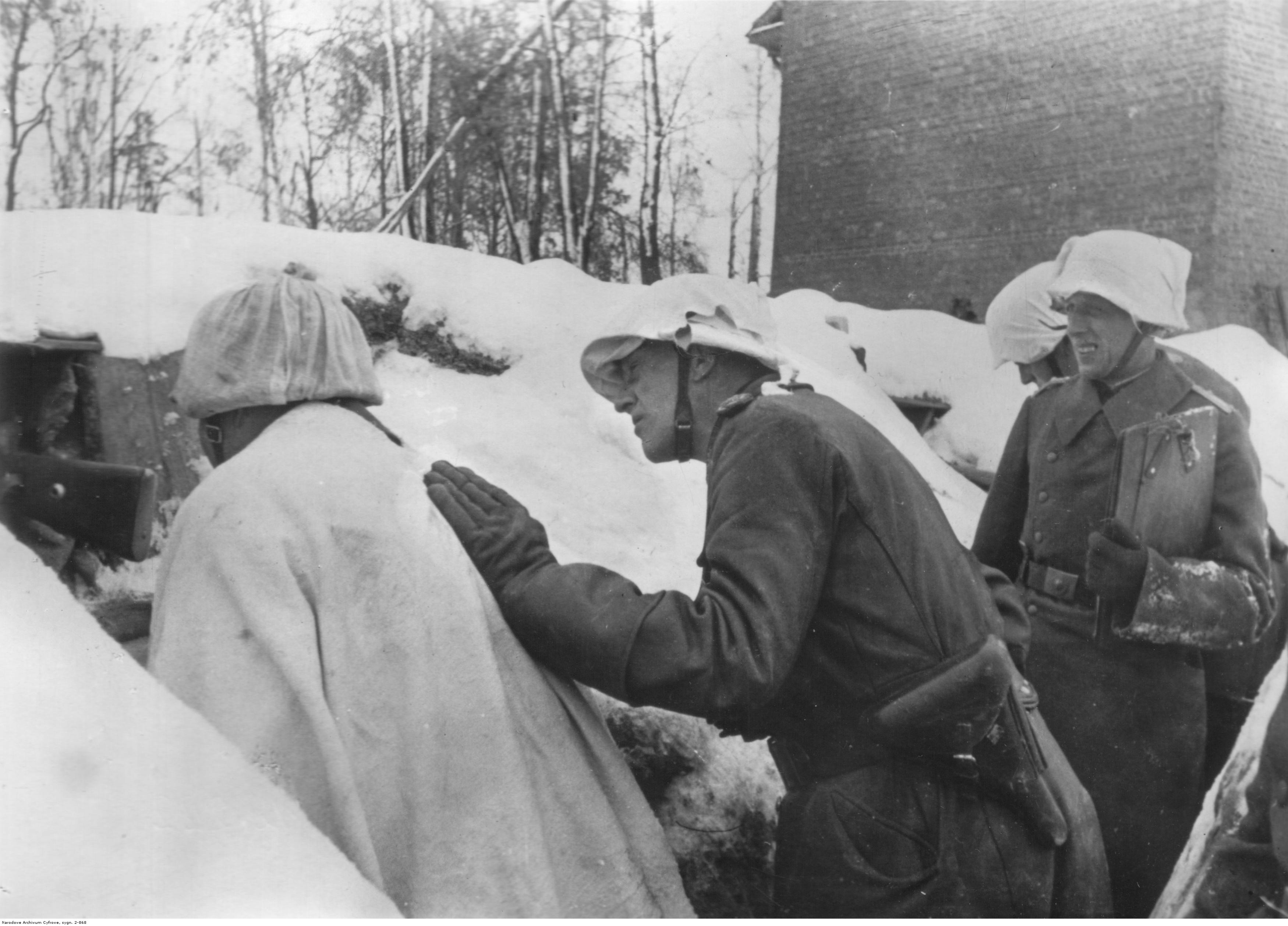
Georg Lindemann (2nd from left) during an inspection in the trenches near Leningrad.

In 1936, Lindemann was promoted to Major General and given command of 36th Infantry Division, which took part in the 1940 Battle of France. Lindemann was promoted to Lieutenant General and given command of the L Army Corps, which he led in Operation Marita in April 1941.

In June 1941, at the start of Operation Barbarossa, L Corps was part of Army Group North. Lindemann led L corps towards Leningrad. L Corps was briefly shifted to Army Group Centre during the Battle of Smolensk, then returned to Army Group North. L Corps reached the edge of Leningrad in August.

On 16 January 1942, Lindemann took command of the 18th Army, a part of Army Group North. In the summer of 1942, he was promoted to Generaloberst. Lindemann commanded 18th Army in the fighting around Leningrad and the January 1944 retreat to Narva. He was promoted to command of Army Group North on 31 March 1944. On 4 July 1944, he was relieved and transferred to the Reserve Army. On 1 February 1945, he was appointed commander of German occupation troops in Denmark. After German forces surrendered in Denmark on 5 May 1945, Lindemann dismantled the German occupation until 6 June 1945, when he was arrested at his headquarters in Silkeborg. He was held in American custody until 1948. Lindemann died in 1963 in Freudenstadt, West Germany.

== Awards and decorations ==
- Iron Cross (1914) 2nd Class (9 September 1914) & 1st Class (28 July 1915)
- Clasp to the Iron Cross (1939) 2nd Class (26 September 1939) & 1st Class (30 October 1939)
- Knight's Cross of the Iron Cross with Oak Leaves
  - Knight's Cross on 5 August 1940 as Generalleutnant and commander of the 36. Infantry-Division
  - Oak Leaves on 21 August 1943 as Generaloberst and commander of the 18.Armee
- The Soviet city of Gatschina near Leningrad was renamed after him in Lindemannstadt between 1942 and 1944.

Military offices
Preceded by none	Commander of 36. Infanterie-Division; 1 September 1939 – 25 October 1940	Succeeded by Generalleutnant Otto-Ernst Ottenbacher
Preceded by None	Commander of L. Armeekorps; 10 October 1940 - 19 January 1942	Succeeded by General der Kavallerie Philipp Kleffel
Preceded by Generalfeldmarschall Georg von Küchler	Commander of 18. Armee; 16 January 1942 – 29 March 1944	Succeeded by General der Artillerie Herbert Loch
Preceded by Generalfeldmarschall Walter Model	Commander of Heeresgruppe Nord; 31 March 1944 – 4 July 1944	Succeeded by Generaloberst Johannes Frießner
Preceded by Hermann von Hanneken	Wehrmachtbefehlshaber of Denmark; 1 February 1945 – 6 June 1945	Succeeded by Post abolished
