= L Army Corps (Wehrmacht) =

L. Armeekorps
- Active: 8 October 1940 – 8 May 1945
- Country: Nazi Germany
- Branch: Army
- Size: Corps
- Engagements: World War II: Invasion of Yugoslavia; Battle of Greece; Operation Barbarossa; Siege of Leningrad; Courland Pocket

Commanders
- Notable commanders: Georg Lindemann; Philipp Kleffel

L Army Corps (L. Armeekorps) was a corps in the German Army during World War II.

== Commanders ==
- General der Kavallerie (Lieutenant General) Georg Lindemann, 1 October 1940 – 19 January 1942
- General der Kavallerie (Lieutenant General) Philipp Kleffel, 19 January 1942 – 3 March 1942
- General der Infanterie (Lieutenant General) Herbert von Böckmann, 3 March 1942 – 20 July 1942
- General der Kavallerie (Lieutenant General) Philipp Kleffel, 20 July 1942 – 17 September 1943
- General der Infanterie (Lieutenant General) Wilhelm Wegener, 17 September 1943 – 24 September 1944
- Generalleutnant (Major General) Hans Boeckh-Behrens, 24 September 1944 – 24 October 1944
- General der Gebirgstruppe (Lieutenant General) Friedrich-Jobst Volckamer von Kirchensittenbach, 25 October 1944 – 11 April 1945
- Generalleutnant (Major General) Erpo Freiherr von Bodenhausen, 12 April 1945 – 8 May 1945

== Area of operations ==
- Germany – October 1940 – April 1941
- Balkans – April 1941 – June 1941
- Eastern Front, northern sector – June 1941 – October 1944
- Kurland pocket – October 1944 – May 1945

== See also ==
- List of German corps in World War II
