= Ernst Merk =

- Born: 27 September 1903
- Died: 12 June 1975 (aged 71)
- Military career
- Allegiance: Weimar Republic; Nazi Germany
- Branch: Army
- Service years: 1923–45
- Rank: Generalmajor
- Units: III Army Corps; 18th Army
- Conflicts: World War II
- Awards: Knight's Cross of the Iron Cross

Ernst Merk (27 September 1903 – 12 June 1975) was a general in the Army of Nazi Germany during World War II. He was a recipient of the Knight's Cross of the Iron Cross.

== Awards ==
- Knight's Cross of the Iron Cross on 15 July 1944 as Oberst im Generalstab and chief of the general staff of the III. Panzerkorps

Military offices
Preceded by Oberst i.G. Wilhelm Hetzel	Chief of the General Staff of the 18. Armee; 5 March 1945 – 10 (!) May 1945	Succeeded by None
