= Ludwig Kirschner =

German General and Knight's Cross recipient (1904–1945)

- Born: 12 June 1904; Bayreuth, German Empire
- Died: 11 February 1945 (aged 40); Saybusch, Poland
- Military career
- Allegiance: Nazi Germany
- Branch: Army
- Service years: 1936–45
- Rank: Generalmajor
- Commands: 320. Volksgrenadier-Division
- Conflicts: World War II: Vistula–Oder Offensive †
- Awards: Knight's Cross of the Iron Cross with Oak Leaves

Ludwig Kirschner (12 June 1904 – 11 February 1945) was a general in the Wehrmacht of Nazi Germany during World War II who commanded the 320. Volksgrenadier-Division. He was a recipient of the Knight's Cross of the Iron Cross with Oak Leaves. Kirschner was killed on 11 February 1945 in Saybusch, Poland.

== Awards and decorations ==
- Iron Cross (1939) 2nd Class (31 December 1940) & 1st Class (14 September 1941)
- Honour Roll Clasp of the Army (8 February 1942)
- Knight's Cross of the Iron Cross with Oak Leaves
  - Knight's Cross on 18 January 1942 as Major and commander of the I./Infanterie-Regiment 436
  - Oak Leaves on 28 October 1942 as Oberstleutnant and commander of Infanterie-Regiment 72

Military offices
| Preceded by None | Commander of 320. Volksgrenadier-Division; 1 November 1944 – 11 February 1945 | Succeeded by Oberst Rolf Scherenberg |
