= 32nd Infantry Division (Wehrmacht) =

32. Infanterie-Division; German 32nd Infantry Division
- Active: 1 October 1936 – 10 May 1945
- Country: Nazi Germany
- Branch: Heer (Wehrmacht)
- Type: Infantry
- Size: Division
- Engagements: World War II: Invasion of Poland; Battle of France; Operation Sea Lion; Operation Barbarossa; Demyansk Pocket; Courland Pocket

Commanders
- Notable commanders: Wilhelm Wegener

The 32nd Infantry Division (German: 32. Infanterie-Division) of the German Army was mobilized on 1 August 1939 for the upcoming invasion of Poland. At that time, it consisted of the usual German Infantry Division elements: three infantry regiments of three battalions each, one three-battalion regiment of light artillery, one battalion of heavy artillery (from a separate artillery regiment, but attached to the particular division), a Panzerjäger (anti-tank) Battalion, a reconnaissance (Aufklärungs) Battalion, a Signals Battalion, a Pioneer (Engineer) Battalion, and divisional supply, medical, and administrative units. (Note: See nomenclature used by the Wehrmacht and Waffen-SS)

== History ==
The 32nd Infantry Division was formed on 1 October 1936 in Köslin, in the II Military District under the command of Generalleutnant Nikolaus von Falkenhorst. The division was already mobilized on 1 August 1939 and transferred to the Polish border in the area of Preußisch Friedland. At the outbreak of World War II, the division crossed the Polish border on 1 September 1939 and reached the Vistula at Kulm on the third day of operations. On 6 September the division crossed the Drewenz at Gollup and continued its advance to the Modlin Fortress via Sierpc. The division encircled the fortress from the southeast and then marched to Warsaw-Praga.

In December 1939 the division was moved to the Eifel. Here the Feldersatz-Bataillon 32 (32nd Field Replacement Battalion) was transferred to the 162nd Infantry Division in January 1940. In February 1940, the II./Infanterie-Regiment 94 (2nd Battalion of the 94th Infantry Regiment) was handed over to the 292nd Infantry Division. At the beginning of the Battle of France (Fall Gelb—Case Yellow), the German invasion of France and the Low Countries, the division stationed southwest of Prüm in the Eifel and penetrated the Belgian border defenses and crossed the river Meuse at Givet. The division then marched through Ohain to Cambrai, and from here south of Douai (initially facing the 5th North African Division) to La Bassée and Lille; it overcame resistance from the French 1st Mechanized Division as well as from the 2nd North African Division, as well as some British forces. During the second phase campaign, Fall Rot (Case Red), the division crossed the river Somme at Bray-sur-Somme and the river Seine near Rouen. Afterwards the division pursued the defeated French opponents to the river Loire near Nantes. Here the division remained until August 1940. It then relocated to the Cotentin Peninsula, in preparation for Operation Sea Lion (Unternehmen Seelöwe), the planned invasion of the United Kingdom which was never carried out.

In October 1940 the division was transferred to East Prussia. At the same time, the staff of Infanterie-Regiment 4 (4th Infantry Regiment) and every 3rd battalion of every infantry regiment were handed off to the 122nd Infantry Division. The hand-offs were replaced.

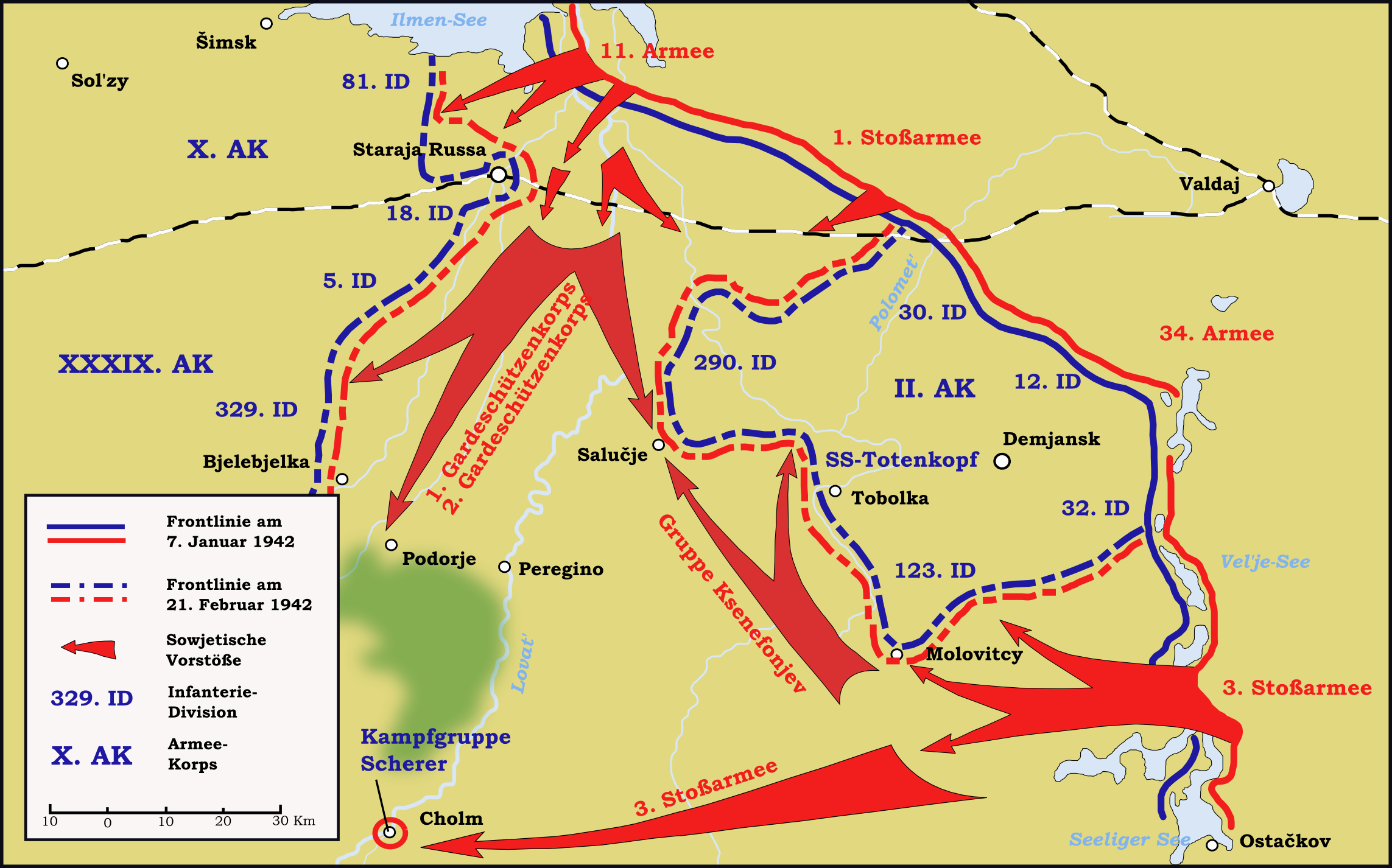
Offensive of the Red Army south of Lake Ilmen 7 January–21 February 1942.

In the winter of 1941 the Division was trapped in the Demyansk Pocket along with the 12th, 30th, 123rd and 290th infantry divisions, and the SS-Division Totenkopf, as well as RAD, Police, Todt organization and other auxiliary units, for a total of about 90,000 German troops and around 10,000 auxiliaries. Their commander was General der Infanterie Walter Graf von Brockdorff-Ahlefeldt, commander of the II. Armeekorps (2nd Army Corps). Following the successful relief of the Demyansk Pocket three of its infantry battalions were disbanded due to heavy casualties.

The 32nd remained fighting mostly in the northern sector, eventually withdrawn to the Courland Pocket, taking part in the desperate battles there during the winter of 1944-45 before being withdrawn by the German Navy. And was finally encircled in the Hel Peninsula where it surrendered to the Soviet Army on May 8, 1945.

== Commanders ==
- Generaloberst Nikolaus von Falkenhorst, 1 October 1936 – 19 July 1939
- Generalleutnant Franz Böhme, 19 July 1939 – 1 October 1939
- Generalleutnant Eccard Freiherr von Gablenz, 1 October 1939 – 1 December 1939
- Generalleutnant Franz Böhme, 1 December 1939 – 15 June 1940
- Generalleutnant Wilhelm Bohnstedt, 15 June 1940 – 1 March 1942
- Generalleutnant Karl Hernekamp, 1 March 1942 – 1 June 1942
- General der Infanterie Wilhelm Wegener, 1 June 1942 – 27 June 1943
- Generalleutnant Alfred Thielmann, 27 June 1943 – 12 September 1943
- Generalleutnant Hans Boeckh-Behrens, 12 September 1943 – 1 February 1944
- Generalmajor Franz Schlieper, 1 February 1944 – 1 June 1944
- Generalleutnant Hans Boeckh-Behrens, 1 June 1944 – 13 August 1944
- Generalmajor Georg Koßmala, 13 August 1944 – September 1944
- Generalleutnant Hans Boeckh-Behrens, September 1944

== Bibliography ==
- Schröder, Jürgen; Schultz-Naumann, Joachim (1962) [1956]. Die Geschichte der pommerschen 32. Infanterie-Division 1935-1945 [The History of the Pomeranian 32nd Infantry Division 1935–1945]. Bad Nauheim, Germany: Podzun-Verlag. OCLC 12039946.
