= 25th Army (Wehrmacht) =

- German: 25. Armee
- Active: November 1944 – May 1945
- Country: Nazi Germany
- Branch: German Army
- Size: Field army
- Engagements: World War II

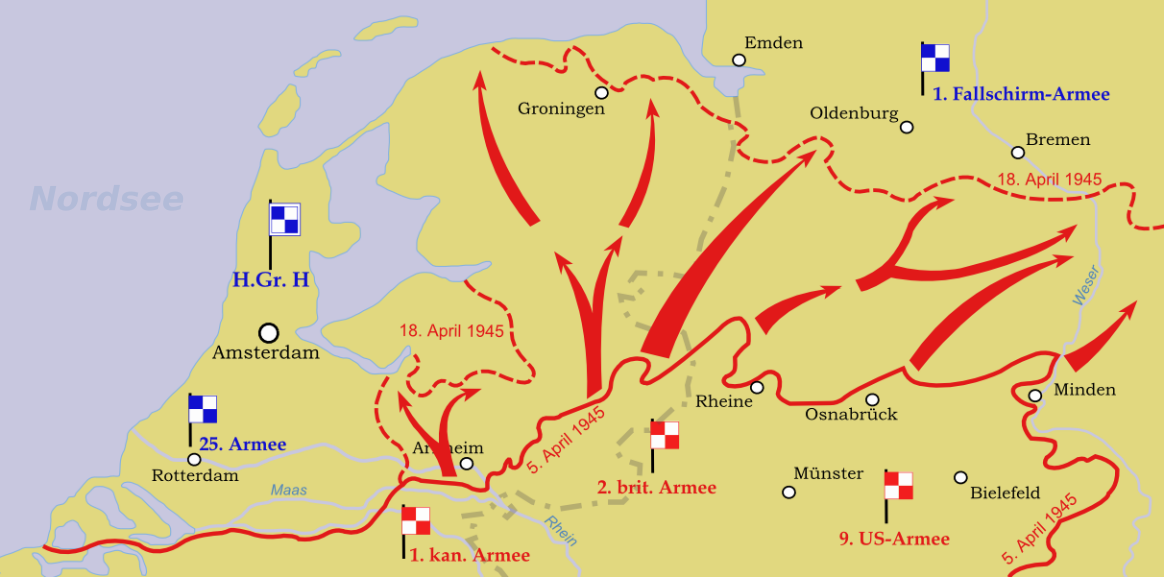
21st Army Group operations, 1945. 25th Army is to the left.

The 25th Army (German: 25. Armee) was a World War II field army of the German Army. It had the highest ordinal number of any of the numbered German armies.

== History ==
The 25th Army was formed on 10 November 1944 in the Netherlands, from the staffs of the Armed Forces Commander of the Netherlands and Armeeabteilung Kleffel (previously known as "Narva Task Force"). The designation as "army" was a deception measure for most of the command's existence, as it did not command more than three divisions until April 1945, during the final days of its existence.

The 25th Army held the northernmost position of the Nazi German front line of the Western Front for less than six months in late 1944 and early 1945, with its western flank anchored on the North Sea and its eastern flank adjoining the 1st Parachute Army. Defending the western Netherlands along the Meuse (Maas), from the North Sea to Arnhem, its primary opponent was the First Canadian Army.

Its first, and longest commander was Wehrmachtbefehlshaber Friedrich Christiansen, Supreme Commander of Reichskommissariat Niederlande. He was followed by General der Infanterie Günther Blumentritt, then General der Kavallerie Philipp Kleffel. From November 1944 until April 1945, the 25th Army was subordinated to Army Group H and subsequently was transferred to the Northwest High Command (Oberbefehlshaber Nordwest).

On 7 April 1945, the 25th Army was converted into the Netherlands High Command (Oberbefehlshaber Niederlande), under command of Generaloberst Johannes Blaskowitz, to defend Fortress Holland (Festung Holland), the area west of the New Dutch Waterline.

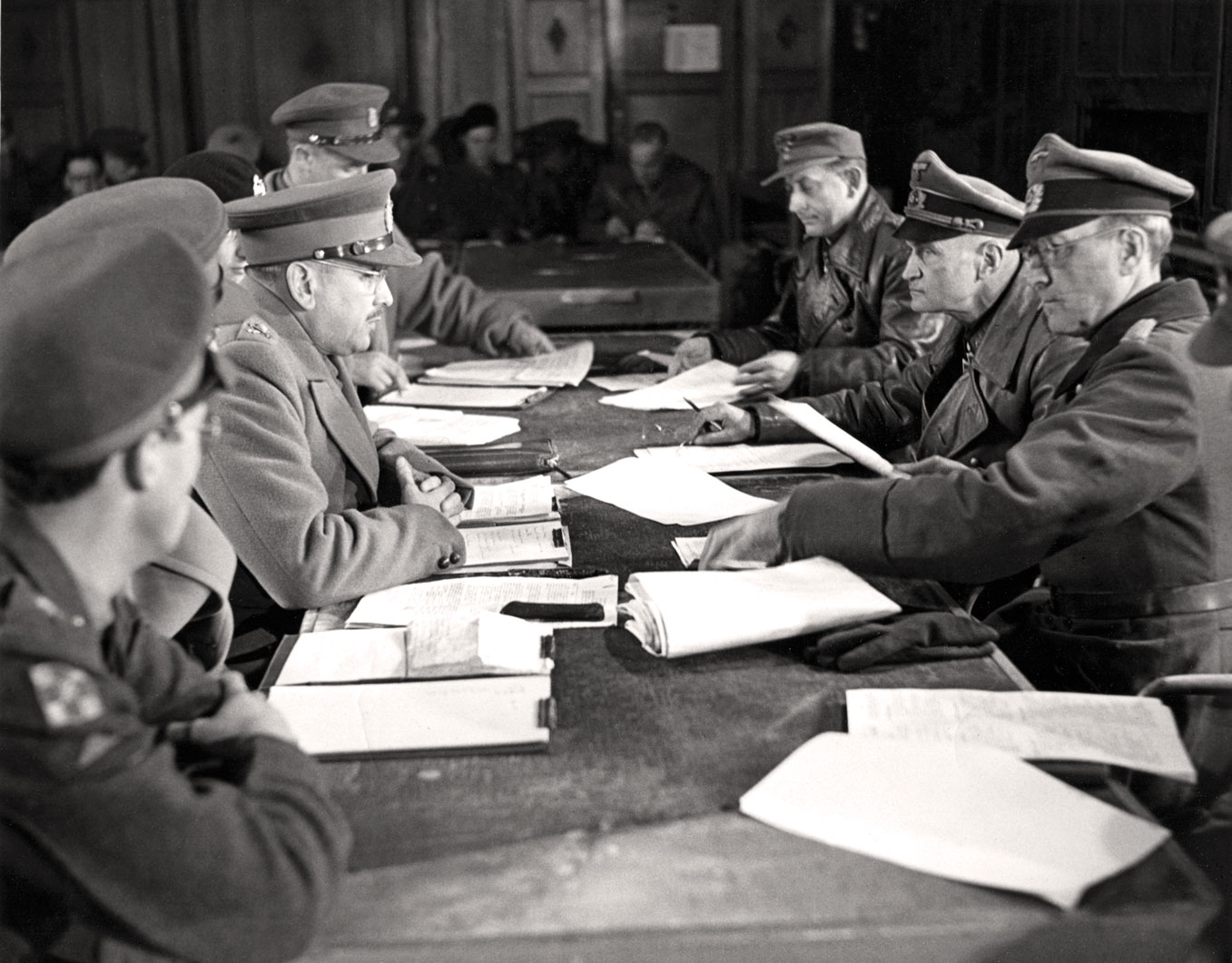
25th Army, as Netherlands High Command (right), surrenders to I Canadian Corps on 5 May 1945

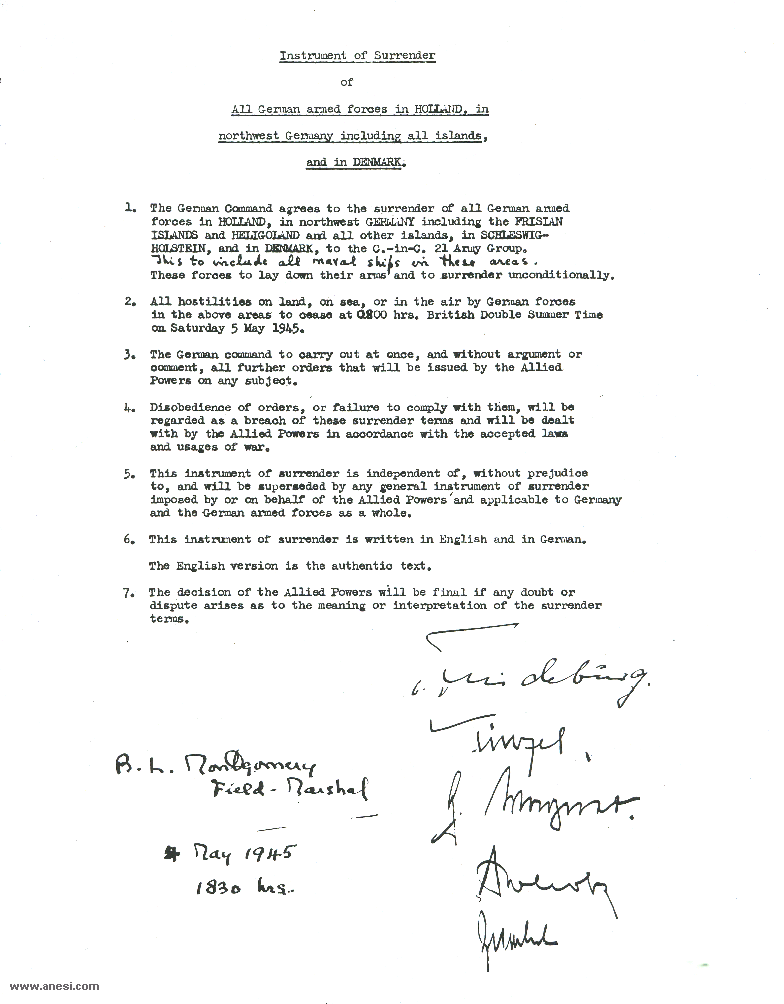
Surrender of German forces in Holland to Allied 21st Army Group, 4 May 1945

Two days after the surrender of the Northwest High Command to the British 21st Army Group, Generaloberst Blaskowitz surrendered his command to I Canadian Corps' Lieutenant-General Charles Foulkes at Wageningen on 5 May 1945 (documents typed and signed the next day, as no typewriter had been available), effectively ending the war in the Netherlands.

== Commanders ==
No.	Portrait	Commander 25th Army	Took office	Left office	Time in office
1	Friedrich Christiansen	General der Flieger; Friedrich Christiansen (1879–1972)	10 November 1944	28 January 1945	79 days
2	Günther Blumentritt	General der Infanterie; Günther Blumentritt (1892–1967)	29 January 1945	28 March 1945	58 days
3	Philipp Kleffel	General der Kavallerie; Philipp Kleffel (1887–1964)	28 March 1945	7 April 1945	10 days

No.	Portrait	Oberbefehlshaber Niederlande	Took office	Left office	Time in office
1	Johannes Blaskowitz	Generaloberst; Johannes Blaskowitz (1883–1948)	7 April 1945	6 May 1945	29 days

== Sources ==
- Stacey, C. P. (1960). The Victory Campaign, The Queen's Printer and Controller of Stationery, Ottawa.
- Tessin, Georg (1976). Verbände und Truppen der deutschen Wehrmacht und Waffen-SS im Zweiten Weltkrieg 1939-1945 (Volume IV), Biblio Verlag, Osnabrück. ISBN 3-7648-1083-1.
