= German Cross =

Military award of Nazi Germany

German Cross Deutsches Kreuz
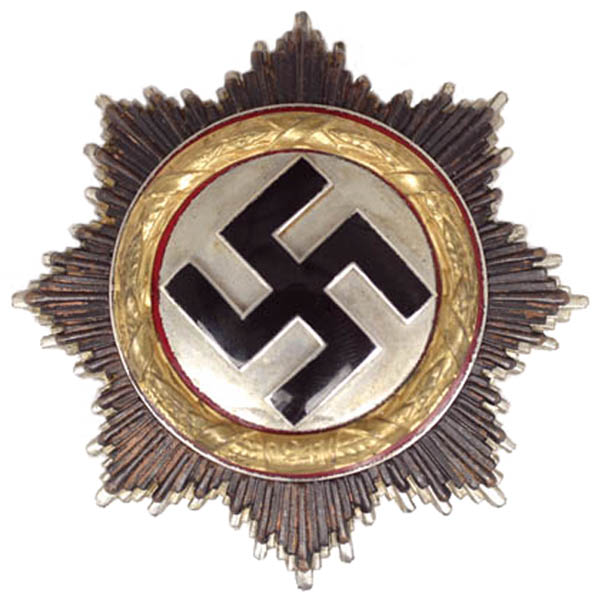
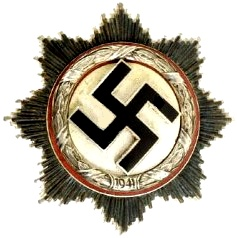
- German Cross in Gold (left) and Silver (right)
- Type: Military Order
- Awarded for: Gold: for repeated exceptional acts of bravery or troop leadership Silver: for continued distinguished acts of service in the war effort
- Presented by: Nazi Germany
- Eligibility: Military personnel
- Campaign: World War II
- Status: Obsolete
- Established: 28 September 1941

Highlights
- Total: ~25,964 in Gold; ~ 2,471 in Silver
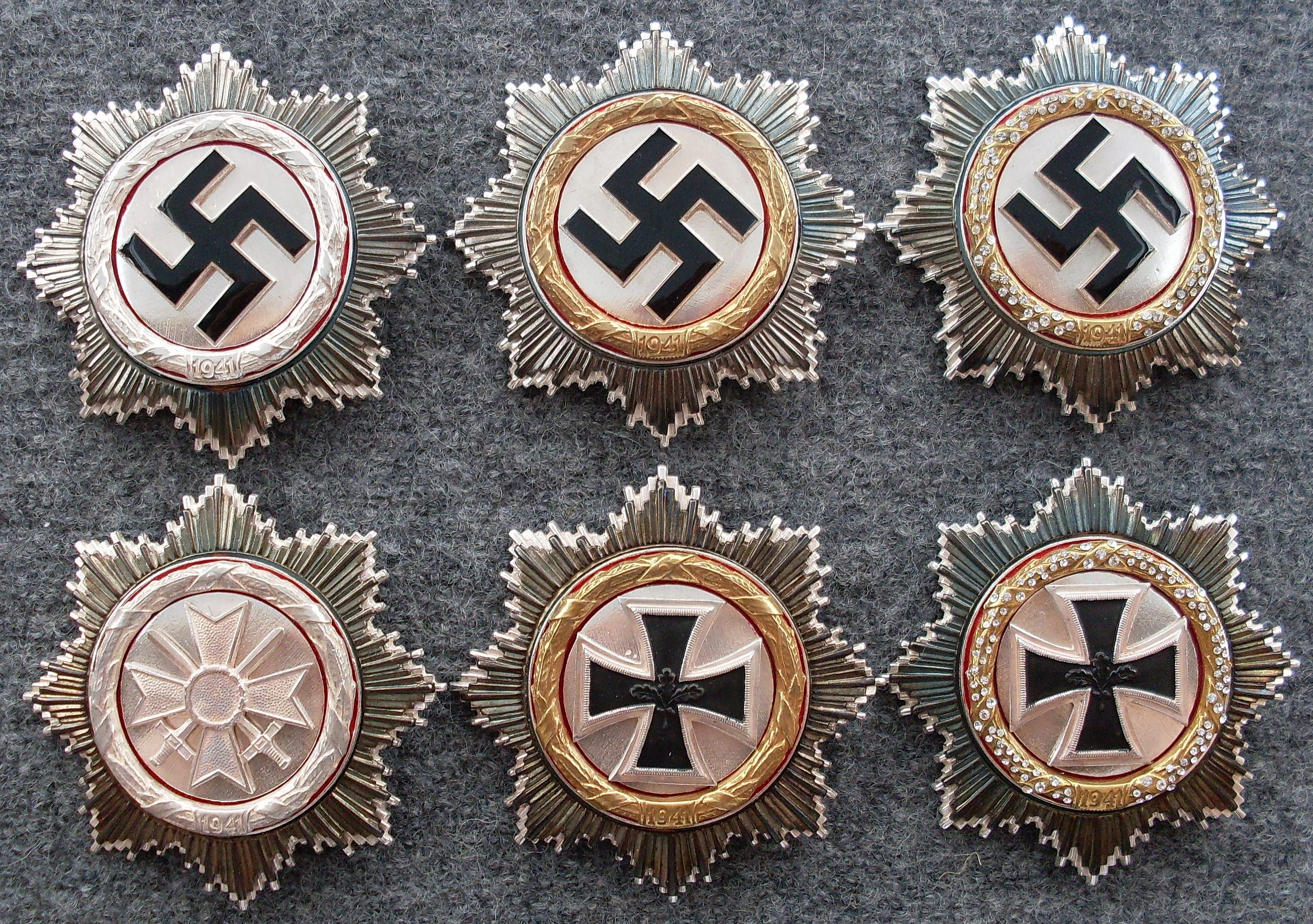
- German Cross in Silver, Gold, and with Diamonds. Post-war de-Nazified versions below.

Precedence
- Next (lower): Iron Cross (1939) 1st Class; Clasp to the Iron Cross, 1st Class; War Merit Cross 1st Class with Swords

The War Order of the German Cross (German: Der Kriegsorden Deutsches Kreuz), normally abbreviated to the German Cross or Deutsches Kreuz, was instituted by Adolf Hitler on 28 September 1941. It was awarded in two divisions: in gold for repeated acts of bravery or military leadership; and in silver for distinguished non-combat war service. The German Cross in Gold ranked higher than the Iron Cross First Class but below the Knight's Cross of the Iron Cross, while the German Cross in Silver ranked higher than the War Merit Cross First Class with Swords but below the Knight's Cross of the War Merit Cross with Swords.

== Eligibility ==
The German Cross was issued in two versions: gold and silver (the color of the laurel wreath around the swastika). The gold version was awarded to military personnel for repeated acts of bravery in combat, or of military leadership, with 6–8 acts as a rule of thumb. The silver version was awarded for multiple distinguished services in the war effort and was considered a continuation of the War Merit Cross with swords. Where a recipient had been awarded both the silver and gold versions, only the gold version was authorized for wear.

Article three of the law governing the German Cross states that to qualify for the German Cross in gold or silver, the recipient must be a holder of the Iron Cross (1939) 1st Class or Clasp to the 1914 Iron Cross 1st Class, or the War Merit Cross 1st Class with Swords. The award of the German Cross was not a prerequisite for the award of the Knight's Cross of either the Iron Cross or War Merit Cross, and the German Cross could be awarded to Knight's Cross holders.

While civilians were not eligible, awards could be made to members of uniformed formations including the police and railway workers.

From 30 August 1944, recipients of the gold class of the Close Combat Clasp were normally also awarded the German Cross in gold, without the need for further justification, although the additional award was not made in all cases.

While estimates vary, approximately 25,964 gold and 2,471 silver crosses were awarded.

== Appearance ==
The order consists of a star badge, containing a swastika. It had a diameter of 6.5 centimetres (2.6 in) and was worn on the right-hand side of the tunic.

From June 1942 the gold version was officially available in cloth form, for easier wear on the combat uniform. This had the same dimensions as the original decoration, with the wreath circling the swastika, the only metal part of the badge. The backing cloth reflected the arm of service: field grey for the army, or navy dark blue or air force pale blue.

Twenty specimen copies of a special grade, the German Cross in Gold with Diamonds, were manufactured in 1942, but this grade was never formally instituted or bestowed.

=== 1957 version ===
The wearing of Nazi-era decorations was banned in Germany after the war, as was any display of the swastika. In 1957, the Federal Republic of Germany authorized the wearing of alternative de-Nazified replacement versions of a number of war decorations. These included the German Cross, with the swastika replaced by a representation of the Iron Cross for the gold division, and the War Merit Cross with Swords for the silver division. Qualifying members of the Bundeswehr wore the award on their ribbon bar, represented by a small replica of the decoration on a field grey ribbon.

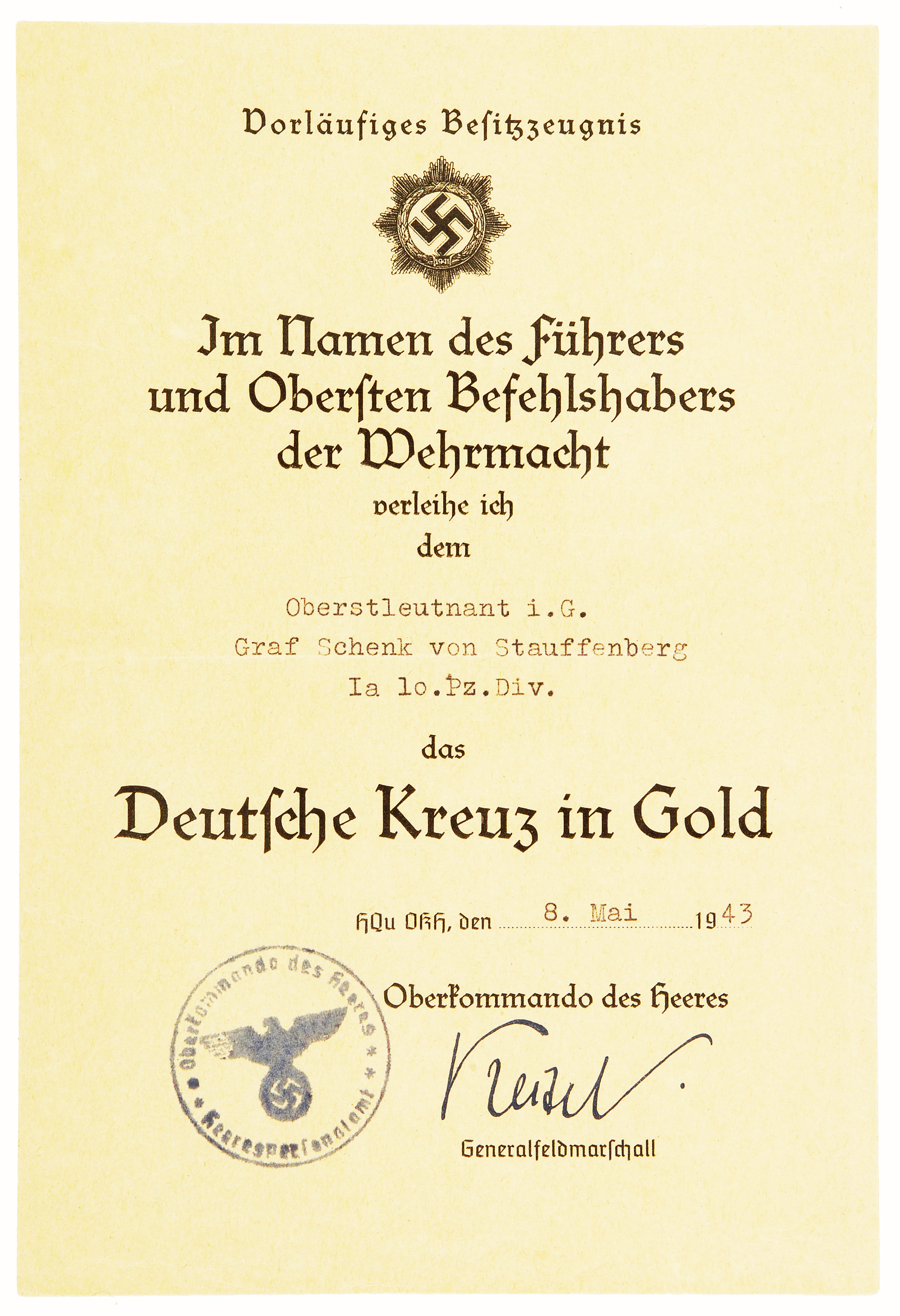
Award certificate: German Cross in Gold to Count Claus von Stauffenberg 8 May 1943

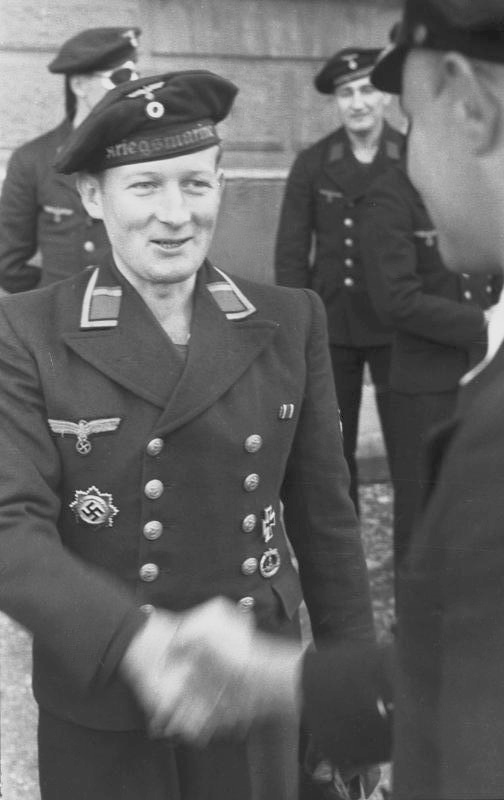
Award of a Marine (submarine crew) with the German Cross in Gold (1942)

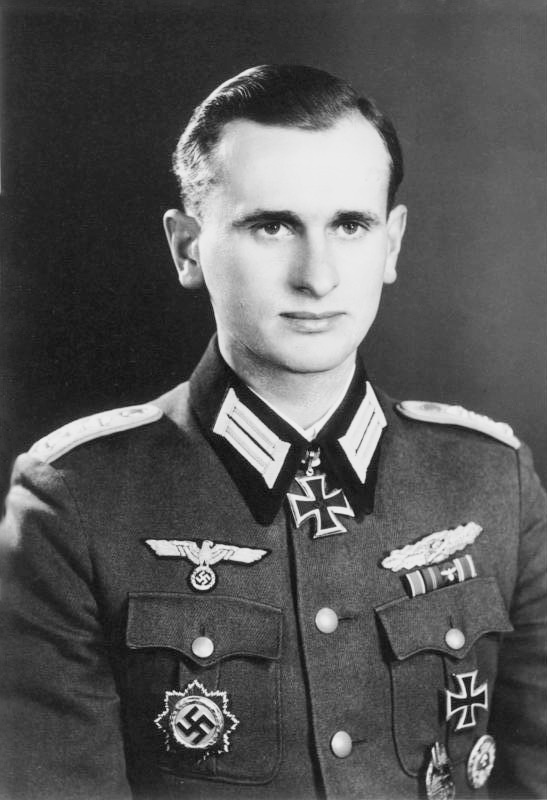
Worn on chest pocket of the field blouse (Captain Alfred Jaedtke, 1944)

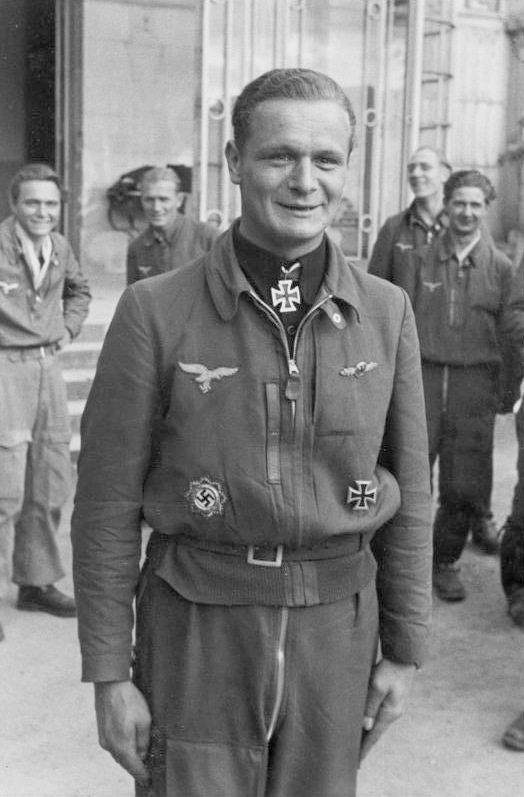
Cloth version worn on Luftwaffe flight suit (Lieutenant Siegfried Lemke, 1944)

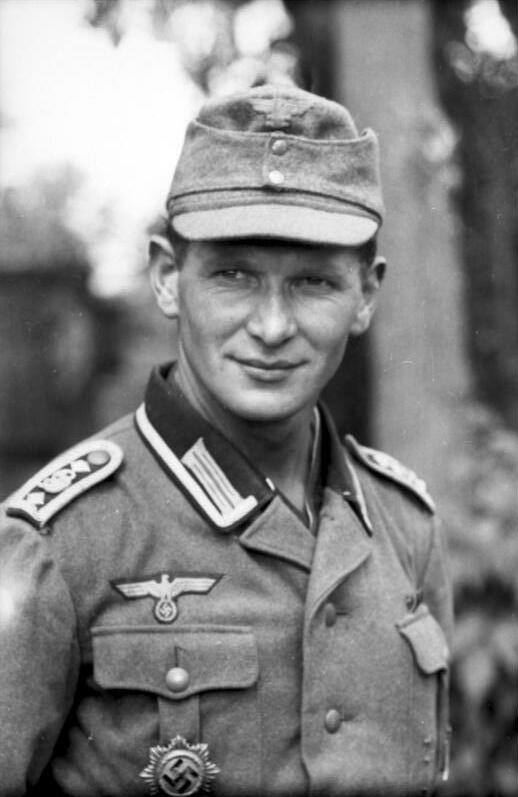
Worn on the field uniform by an Oberfeldwebel of the Großdeutschland Division in Central Russia, 1943

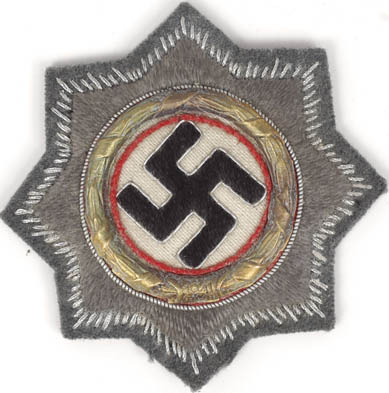
German Cross in Gold (cloth form)

== Recipients ==
Select recipients of both gold and silver grades included:

- SS-Sturmbannführer Wilhelm Mohnke, 26 December 1941 (gold)
- Oberst Hans Krebs, 26 January 1942 (gold)
- SA-Obergruppenführer Günther Gräntz, 23 February 1942 (gold)
- Generalmajor Helmuth Weidling, 23 June 1942 (gold)
- Hauptmann Franz Maierhofer, 1 July 1942 (gold)
- Generalmajor Ernst Merk, 11 February 1944 (gold) & 6 July 1942 (silver)
- Luftwaffe Leutnant Walter Krupinski, 27 August 1942 (gold)
- SS-Obersturmbannführer Fritz Knoechlein, 15 November 1942 (gold)
- Oberst Bodo Zimmermann, 25 September 1944 (gold) & 15 February 1943 (silver)
- SS-Standartenführer und Oberst der Polizei Walther Rauff, 7 February 1945 (gold) & 20 May 1943 (silver)
- SS-Hauptsturmführer Alfred-Ingemar Berndt, 17 July 1943 (gold)
- Luftwaffe Hauptmann Günther Specht, 25 November 1943 (gold)
- Generalleutnant Felix Schwalbe, 7 December 1944 (gold) & 30 November 1943 (silver)
- SS-Obersturmbannführer Oskar Dirlewanger, 5 December 1943 (gold)
- SS-Standartenführer Bruno Streckenbach, 15 December 1943 (gold)
- SS-Obersturmbannführer Kurt Weisse, 25 August 1944 (gold)
- Luftwaffe Oberleutnant Franz Stigler, 1 October 1944 (gold)
- SS-Gruppenführer und Generalleutnant der Polizei Odilo Globocnik, 7 February 1945 (gold) & 20 January 1945 (silver)
- SS-Standartenführer Rudolf Lange, 6 February 1945 (gold) awarded posthumously by Adolf Hitler.
- Major Josef Gangl, 8 March 1945 (gold)

=== Foreign recipients ===
In October 1942, eligibility for the German Cross in Gold was extended to the armed forces of allied countries on the same basis as awards to German forces.

Select foreign recipients of the German Cross in Gold include:

Belgium

- SS-Standartenführer Léon Degrelle, 9 October 1944

Croatia

- Lieutenant Cvitan Galić, 23 June 1943
- 1st Lieutenant Mato Dukovac

Estonia

- Senior Lieutenant Hando Ruus, 30 December 1944

Finland

- General Erik Heinrichs, 17 August 1943
- Lieutenant General Jarl Lundqvist, 9 November 1943
- Lieutenant General Karl Lennart Oesch, 5 August 1944,
- SS-Obersturmführer Ulf-Ola Olin, 28 February 1945

Italy

- Vice Admiral Luigi Sansonetti, 18 January 1942
- Marshal Ettore Bastico, 5 December 1942
- General Enea Navarini, 21 December 1942
- Colonel General Rino Corso Fougier ,18 January 1943

Latvia

- Untersturmführer Kārlis Mūsiņš
- Standartenführer Vilis Janums, 1 March 1945

Romania

- General Gheorghe Avramescu, 25 October 1942
- Major General Leonard Mociulschi, 25 October 1942
- Major General Ermil Gheorghiu, 11 February 1943
- Captain Nicolae Dabija, 10 February 1944

Spain

- Major General Emilio Estéban Infantes y Martín, 9 April 1943

In all, some 26 non-German volunteers of the Waffen-SS from Belgium, Denmark, Estonia, Finland, Hungary, Latvia, Netherlands and Norway received the German Cross in Gold.

== Nicknames ==
Colonel Hans von Luck called it "Hitler's fried egg", in response to its gaudiness. Another name for the decoration was "The Party Reflector for the Near-Sighted"
