= Eberhardt Bohnstedt =

German and Salvadoran military officer

- Bohnstedt in Heer uniform
- Born: 22 July 1886; Kassel, German Empire
- Died: 3 October 1957 (aged 71); Wiesbaden, West Germany
- Military career
- Allegiance: German Empire (1905–1918); Weimar Republic (1918–1933); Nazi Germany (1933–1935); El Salvador (1938–1939); Nazi Germany (1939)
- Service/branch: Deutsches Heer (1905–1918); Reichswehr (1918–1935); Heer (1935); (El Salvador) Army (1938–1939); Heer (1939)
- Service years: 1905–1935, 1938–1939
- Rank: Generalmajor (Heer); General (Salvadoran Army)
- Commands: 7th Infantry Division
- Conflicts: World War I; German spring offensive; Hundred Days Offensive; World War II; Invasion of Poland

Eberhardt Julius Georg Waldemar Bohnstedt (22 July 1886 – 3 October 1957), also sometimes spelt Eberhard, was a German general and commander of the 7th Infantry Division in 1939. He is most well known for being the director of the Military School in El Salvador from 1938 to 1939. He retired from military life in 1939. He was the older brother of Wilhelm Bohnstedt.

== Early life ==
Eberhardt Bohnstedt was born in Kassel, German Empire, on 22 July 1886. In 1905, he joined the German Army as a Lieutenant as a part of the 12th Grenadier Regiment.

== World War I ==
Bohnstedt attended the War Academy from 1912 to 1914, and after which, he served in World War I as a Hauptmann in the General Staff of the 242nd Infantry Division. He participated in the German spring offensive and the Hundred Days Offensive.

== Interwar period ==
Bohnstedt in Salvadoran Army uniform, 1938.

Bohnstedt was allowed to continue service in the Reichswehr following the war and served in the General Staff of the 3rd Division until 1923, when he was transferred to the 2nd Cavalry Division until 1924, the 12th Infantry Regiment until 1925, and then returned to the 3rd Division until 1929. In 1930, he transferred to the 6th Infantry Regiment and then to the 7th Infantry Regiment in 1932. He was promoted to Generalmajor in 1935, but retired shortly after his promotion.

On 24 April 1938, Bohnstedt came out of retirement and was appointed to be the director of the Military School in El Salvador by President Maximiliano Hernández Martínez. In El Salvador, he was promoted to the rank of General. He helped contribute to the fascist sympathies being held by the Salvadoran Army at the time, despite him being selected for his military expertise and not his political positions. Bohnstedt resigned his position in early September 1939 due to pressure from the United States on El Salvador to remove Germans and Italians from high ranking positions in their military.

== World War II ==
He returned to Germany and took command of the 7th Infantry Division from 30 September to 1 December 1939, after which he again retired from military life.

== Personal life ==
Bohnstedt married a woman named Kate. He had a brother, Wilhelm, who commanded the 32nd Infantry Division during World War II and who was a fellow recipient of the Knight's Cross of the Iron Cross.

== Death ==
Bohnstedt died in Wiesbaden, West Germany, on 3 October 1957, at the age of 71. He is buried in the South Cemetery of Wiesbaden.

== Military ranks ==
Insignia	Rank	Service branch	Date of promotion
	Fahnenjunker	Imperial German Army	?
Sub-lieutenant	Leutnant	Imperial German Army	18 August 1905
Oberleutnant	Oberleutnant	Imperial German Army	18 February 1913
Hauptmann	Hauptmann	Imperial German Army	12 December 1914
Major	Major	Reichswehr	1 February 1925
Oberstleutnant	Oberstleutnant	Reichswehr	1 February 1930
Oberst	Oberst	Reichswehr	1 October 1932
Generalmajor	Generalmajor	Heer	1 July 1935
General	General	Salvadoran Army	24 April 1938

== Commands held ==
- 12th Grenadier Regiment
- 242nd Infantry Division
- 3rd Division
- 2nd Cavalry Division
- 12th Infantry Regiment
- 3rd Division
- 6th Infantry Regiment
- 7th Infantry Regiment
- Military School of El Salvador
- 7th Infantry Division

== Awards and decorations ==
Nazi Germany House of Hohenzollern

- Knight's Cross of the House Order of Hohenzollern

Kingdom of Saxony

- Knight's Cross of the Albert Order

Kingdom of Württemberg

- Knight's Cross of the Military Merit Order

Military offices
Preceded by Colonel Alfonso Marroquín	Director of the Military School; 1938–1939	Succeeded by Colonel Zorobabel Galeno
Preceded by General der Infanterie Eugen Ott	Commander of 7. Infanterie-Division; 1939	Succeeded by Generalleutnant Eccard Freiherr von Gablenz
