= Hans Jordan =

German World War II general (1892–1975)

- Born: 27 December 1892; Scheuern by Rastatt, Grand Duchy of Baden, German Empire
- Died: 20 April 1975 (aged 82); Munich, West Germany
- Military career
- Allegiance: German Empire; Weimar Republic; Nazi Germany
- Branch: German Army
- Service years: 1912–1945
- Rank: General der Infanterie
- Commands: 7th Infantry Division; VI Army Corps; 9th Army
- Conflicts: World War I World War II
- Awards: Knight's Cross of the Iron Cross with Oak Leaves and Swords

Hans Jordan (27 December 1892 – 20 April 1975) was a German general during World War II. He was a recipient of the Knight's Cross of the Iron Cross with Oak Leaves and Swords of Nazi Germany.

== Early life and career ==
Jordan was born in Scheuern in 1892 and entered the Royal Prussian Army in 1912. He served in World War I, and at the end of the war was an Oberleutnant posted as an orderly officer on the staff of the 80th Reserve Infantry Division. He remained in the peacetime Reichswehr as a career officer. He was a battalion commander from 1934 to 1937 and commander of instruction groups at the Kriegschule in Munich and Wiener-Neustadt between 1937 and 1939.

== World War II ==
Jordan commanded Infantry Regiment 49 (1939–1941), the 7th Infantry Division (1941–1942) and VI Army Corps (1942–1944). He was given command of the 9th Army on 20 May 1944. The Red Army offensive Operation Bagration began on 22 June 1944. In the northern sector, the 1st Belorussian Front under the command of Colonel General Konstantin Rokossovsky breached the 9th Army defensive positions south and north of Babruysk. The city was encircled on 27 June 1944; Jordan was relieved of command on 26 June. He was transferred to the Operational Zone of the Alpine Foothills in August 1944, where he remained until Germany's surrender in May 1945.

== Awards ==
- Iron Cross (1914) 2nd Class (23 September 1914) & 1st Class (15 April 1916)
- Iron Cross, 1st and 2nd class
- Hanseatic Cross of Hamburg
- Frederickscross
- Knight, 2nd class with swords, of the Order of Albert the Bear
- Wound Badge in silver
- Honour Cross of the World War 1914/1918
- Iron Cross (1939) 1st and 2nd Class
- German Cross in Gold on 23 December 1943 as General der Infanterie and commanding general of the VI. Armeekorps
- Knight's Cross of the Iron Cross with Oak Leaves and Swords
  - Knight's Cross on 5 June 1940 as Oberst and commander of Infanterie-Regiment 49
  - 59th Oak Leaves on 16 January 1942 as Oberst and commander of Infanterie-Regiment 49
  - 64th Swords on 20 April 1944 as General der Infanterie and commanding general of the VI. Armeekorps

Military offices
Preceded by Generalleutnant Eccard Freiherr von Gablenz	Commander of 7. Infanterie-Division; 13 December 1941 – 1 November 1942	Succeeded by Generalleutnant Fritz-Georg von Rappard
Preceded by General der Infanterie Bruno Bieler	Commander of VI. Armeekorps; 1 November 1942 – 20 May 1944	Succeeded by General der Infanterie Georg Pfeiffer
Preceded by General Josef Harpe	Commander of 9. Armee; 20 May 1944 – 26 June 1944	Succeeded by General Nikolaus von Vormann
