= Eugen Ott =

Eugen Ott may refer to:

- Eugen Ott (ambassador) (1889-1977), German ambassador to Japan 1938-1942
- Eugen Ott (general) (1890–1966), German General during World War II
