= Feldjägerkorps =

German WWII military police unit

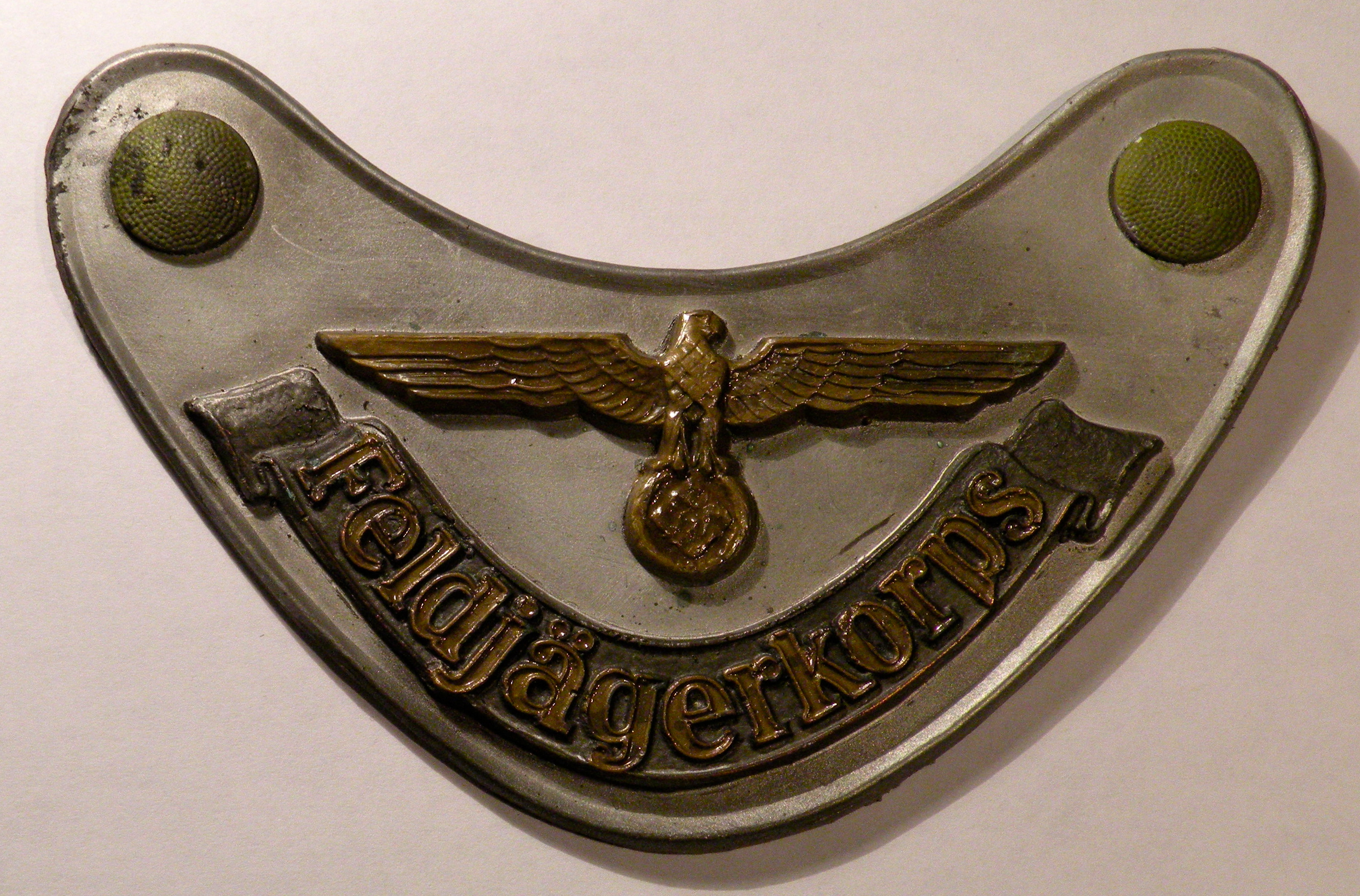
- Gorget of the Feldjägerkorps
- Founded: 27 November 1943
- Disbanded: 23 June 1946
- Country: Nazi Germany
- Allegiance: Germany
- Branch: Wehrmacht
- Type: Military provost
- Role: Discipline, control and punishment
- Part of: Oberkommando der Wehrmacht

Commanders
- Notable commanders: General der Panzertruppe Werner Kempf; General der Infanterie Hans-Karl von Scheele; General der Flieger Wilhelm Speidel

The Feldjägerkorps (German: [ˈfɛlt.jɛːɡɐˌkoːɐ̯]) (lit. field hunter corps) was a military provost organization in the German Wehrmacht during World War II. It was established on 27 November 1943 and consisted of three Feldjäger commands that reported directly to the Oberkommando der Wehrmacht, headed by chief of staff Generalfeldmarschall Wilhelm Keitel. It was recruited from veteran, battle-hardened troops and was senior to all other military police organizations. It operated approximately 12 miles behind the front lines, and its main function was to maintain order and discipline among the troops, hunting down deserters and stragglers and meting out punishment, which could include drumhead courts-martial and execution.

== Background and precursors ==
=== The SA-Feldjägerkorps ===
There were no military units with police-like duties in the Reichswehr, the armed forces of the Weimar Republic. Following the Nazi seizure of power in 1933, a type of police force was established for the Nazi Party's largest paramilitary organization, the Sturmabteilung (SA). The SA played a key role in the Nazi consolidation of power by intimidating and coercing their political opponents with physical violence. The level of violence was so extreme that the political leaders felt the need to exert more control over marauding, undisciplined and often drunken SA stormtroopers. They also sought to protect the SA personnel from legal prosecution by those elements of the regular police force and the judiciary that were not yet fully under Nazi control.

Accordingly, the SA-Feldpolizei was established in Prussia – the largest German state – by a decree of SA-Stabschef Ernst Röhm on 11 August 1933. It reported directly to the Supreme SA Leadership (OSAF) and was placed under the command of SA-Standartenführer Walter Fritsch. On 7 October, it was renamed the SA-Feldjägerkorps. Only ideologically reliable and physically imposing men were recruited for service, and it reached a total of about 200 men. In Bavaria – the second largest German state – a separate but related organization called Feldjägerkorps in Bayern was organized under the command of SA-Obergruppenführer Johann Baptist Fuchs on 27 February 1934. As the Nazis gained more and more control over society through the process of Gleichschaltung and the level of street violence lessened, the necessity for the SA-Feldjägerkorps diminished. On 1 April 1935, the SA-Feldjägerkorps was officially dissolved and suitable personnel were incorporated into the regular uniformed police, the Schutzpolizei.

=== The Feldgendarmerie ===
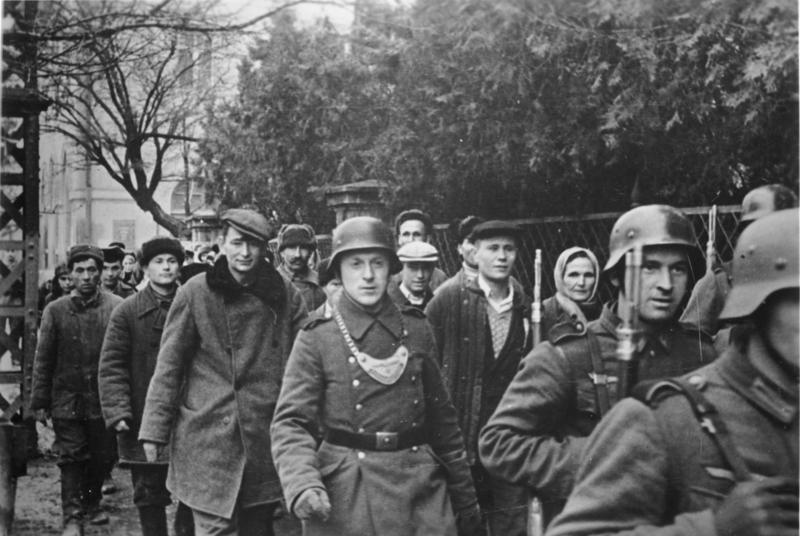
A member of the Feldgendarmerie accompanies Russian prisoners in Simferopol, January 1942.

In the course of the rearmament of Nazi Germany and the establishment of the Wehrmacht in 1935, no permanent military police force was initially established. The formation of permanent specialized law enforcement troops for the military only occurred on mobilization preceding the outbreak of the Second World War. Members of this regular military police force, the Feldgendarmerie, were recruited from the over 8,000 Ordnungspolizei (order police) conscripted into the army. Organizationally, they reported to the Oberkommando des Heeres (Army High Command, OKH), and each field army and division had a Feldgendarmerie component. Among its main tasks were control of the army rear area, control of traffic and supply lines, and conducting searches for deserters, stragglers and those absent without leave (AWOL). The Feldgendarmerie had the authority to issue orders to every soldier in every branch of the military. Following the example of the army, the Luftwaffe Field Divisions and the Waffen-SS also established their own Feldgendarmerie units.

== Establishment of the Feldjägerkorps ==
By late summer 1943, after the battles of Stalingrad and Kursk, the momentum along the eastern front began to turn in favor of the advancing Red Army. German resistance began to weaken, morale was affected and desertions began to increase. Drastic measures were deemed necessary by the Oberkommando der Wehrmacht (Armed Forces High Command, OKW). Feldjägerkommando were authorized by a Führer order of November 1943 in response to the increasing indiscipline, neglect, and signs of subversion behind the front lines. On 9 January 1944 the new Feldjäger units were formed.

== Organization ==
The Feldjägerkorps consisted of three Feldjägerkommando:

- Feldjägerkommando I was formed in Königsberg (today, Kaliningrad). It was commanded by General der Flieger Ernst Müller.
- Feldjägerkommando II was formed in Breslau (today, Wrocław). Its commanders were General der Panzertruppe Werner Kempf, General der Infanterie Karl von Oven and General der Artillerie Willi Moser.
- Feldjägerkommando III was formed in Vienna. It commanders were General der Infanterie Hans-Karl von Scheele, General der Infantrie Martin Grase and General der Flieger Wilhelm Speidel.

Feldjägerkommando I and II were engaged exclusively on the eastern front, while Feldjägerkommando III finished the war on the western front.

Each Feldjägerkommando initially comprised a Feldjägerabteilung (battalion) and, from 24 April 1944, a Feldjägerregiment. The basic unit was the Streife (patrol), which was made up of one officer and three NCOs. Fifty such patrols, divided into three companies, comprised a Feldjägerabteilung. There were five Feldjägerabteilungen in a Feldjägerregiment. The commander of a Feldjägerkommando carried the status and authority of an army-level commander.

== Chain of command and authority ==
The Feldjägerkorps reported directly to OKW and was charged with hunting down deserters, arresting insubordinate soldiers, looters and malingerers, and searching rear areas for any soldiers who were capable of front line service. The units were manned with battle-hardened officers and non-commissioned officers. They were recruited from the ranks of decorated soldiers who had a minimum of three years of combat experience and who had been awarded at least the Iron Cross, second class. They had seniority over every other soldier up to their own rank, regardless of their service branch, including the Waffen-SS. They were granted disciplinary punishment authority, including the power to arrest anyone who could not provide a satisfactory explanation for their absence from active duty. By employing fear backed up by the authority of OKW, the high command intended for the Feldjager units to act as enforcers to stem the tide of desertions and provide the incentive for the German soldiers to continue to stand and fight to the death.

The Feldjägerkommando conducted their own courts-martial, before which suspects could be immediately brought for trial. The commander of each Feldjägerabteilung was assisted by a high-ranking judge (Chefrichter). By May 1944, they were authorized to conduct summary court-martial proceedings, which authorized sentences to be immediately carried out without awaiting confirmation from a higher commander as was the regular procedure. In this respect, the Feldjäger commanders became judges of a Fliegendes Standgericht (flying drumhead court martial). By the end of the war in Europe, it is estimated that up to 30,000 German soldiers were tried and sentenced to death for desertion, with about 20,000 being executed. The remainder had their sentences commuted to long prison terms and were sent to concentration camps or to so-called military "penal battalions" where they were sent on highly dangerous operations, often considered suicide missions, mainly on the eastern front.

== Responsibilities ==
The Feldjägerkorps operated parallel to the front line and approximately 12–15 miles behind it. Their basic responsibilities were to:

- maintain order and discipline
- prevent panic retreats
- gather stragglers and assemble them at collection points, where they could be assembled into ad hoc units
- check soldiers travel and/or leave permits at embarkation points
- round up deserters and either return them to their units, hand them over to the Feldgendarmerie or Geheime Feld Polizei or issue punishment themselves
- capture prisoners-of-war (POWs) and hand them over to the appropriate authorities

They could also be employed in the same capacity as the Feldgendarmerie, providing traffic control, reconnoitering and clearing roads of bomb debris.

== Dissolution ==
After Germany's unconditional surrender on 8 May 1945, some elements of Feldjägerkorps III were kept under arms by the Western Allies in order to maintain order among the thousands of captured German Disarmed Enemy Forces held in the Rheinwiesenlager. These units, which were renamed Wehrmachtordnungstruppe (Armed Forces Order Troop), also collected stragglers and assisted with traffic control. On 23 June 1946, more than after a year after the end of the war in Europe, these former Feldjägerkorps, became the last Wehrmacht troops to formally surrender their arms to the Allies.

== Uniform ==
The Feldjäger wore a regular German Army infantryman's uniform with the white Waffenfarbe piping of the infantry. Their uniform tunic displayed two distinguishing features: the shoulder strap cipher displayed the letters "Fj", and they wore a red armband in place of a cuffband on the lower left sleeve with bold black lettering arranged in two lines: Oberkommando der Wehrmacht – Feldjäger. Their most notable distinction was a crescent-shaped metal gorget with the inscription Feldjagerkorps suspended by a chain around their necks. These features differentiated them from the Feldgendarmerie who wore a brown cuffband and a gorget, both solely inscribed with Feldgendarmerie. The Feldjägerkorps (along with the Feldgendarmerie) were popularly derided as Kettenhunde (chained dogs), in reference to their gorget and chain.

== See also ==
- Feldgendarmerie
- Geheime Feldpolizei
- Wehrmachtstreifendienst

== Sources ==
- Curilla, Wolfgang (2006). The German Order Police and the Holocaust in the Baltic States and Belarus, 1941–1944. Paderborn: F. Schöningh. ISBN 3-506-71787-1.
- German Military Police: The Third Reich – 1939 TO 1945
- Petersson, Lars G. (2014). Hitler's Deserters: When Law Merged With Terror. Fonthill Me. ISBN 978-1-781-55269-8.
- Siemens, Daniel (2017). Stormtroopers: A New History of Hitler's Brownshirts. New Haven: Yale University Press. ISBN 978-0-300-19681-8.
- Williamson, Gordon; Volstad, Ron (1989). German Military Police Units 1939–45. London: Osprey Publishing. ISBN 0-85045-902-8.
- Williamson, Gordon; Vuksic, Velimir (2002). German Security and Police Soldier 1939-45. Osprey Publishing. ISBN 1-84176-416-7.
