= Feldjäger =

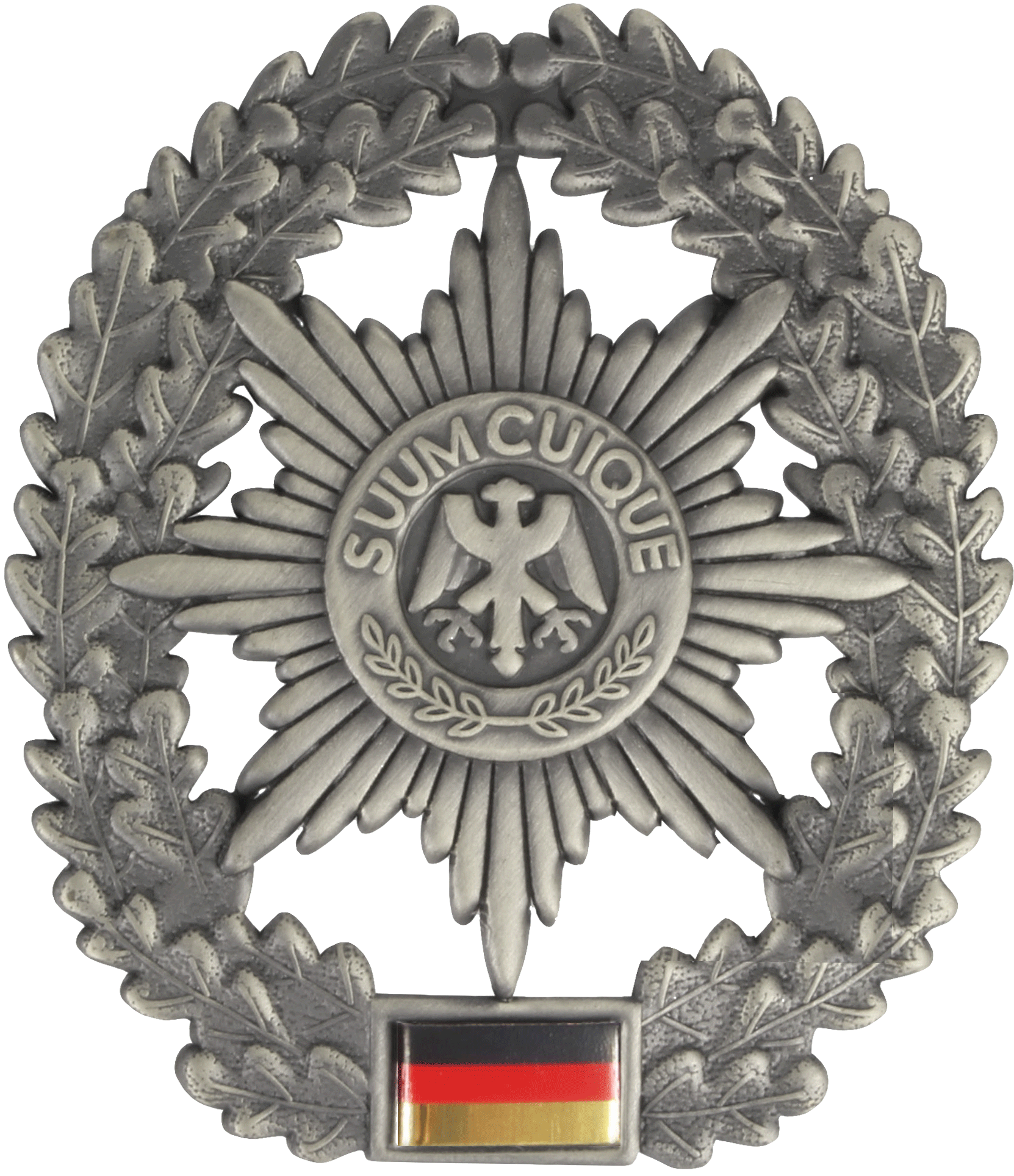
- Beret insignia of the Feldjäger
- Active: 6 October 1955 – Present
- Country: Germany
- Branch: Streitkräftebasis Bundeswehr
- Role: Military police
- Size: 3 regiments
- Garrison/HQ: Scharnhorst Kaserne in Hanover
- Motto: Suum cuique "to each his own"

Insignia
- Black MP brassard of the Feldjäger

"Feldjäger: Militärpolizei der Bundeswehr". Bundeswehr (in German).

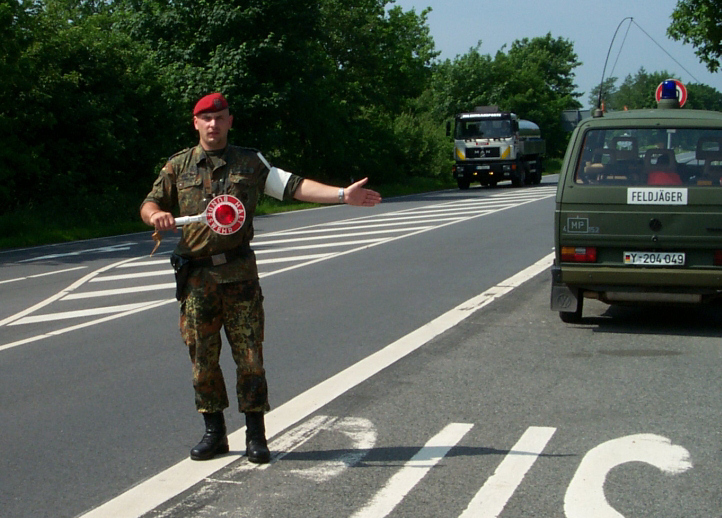
Feldjäger controlling military traffic.

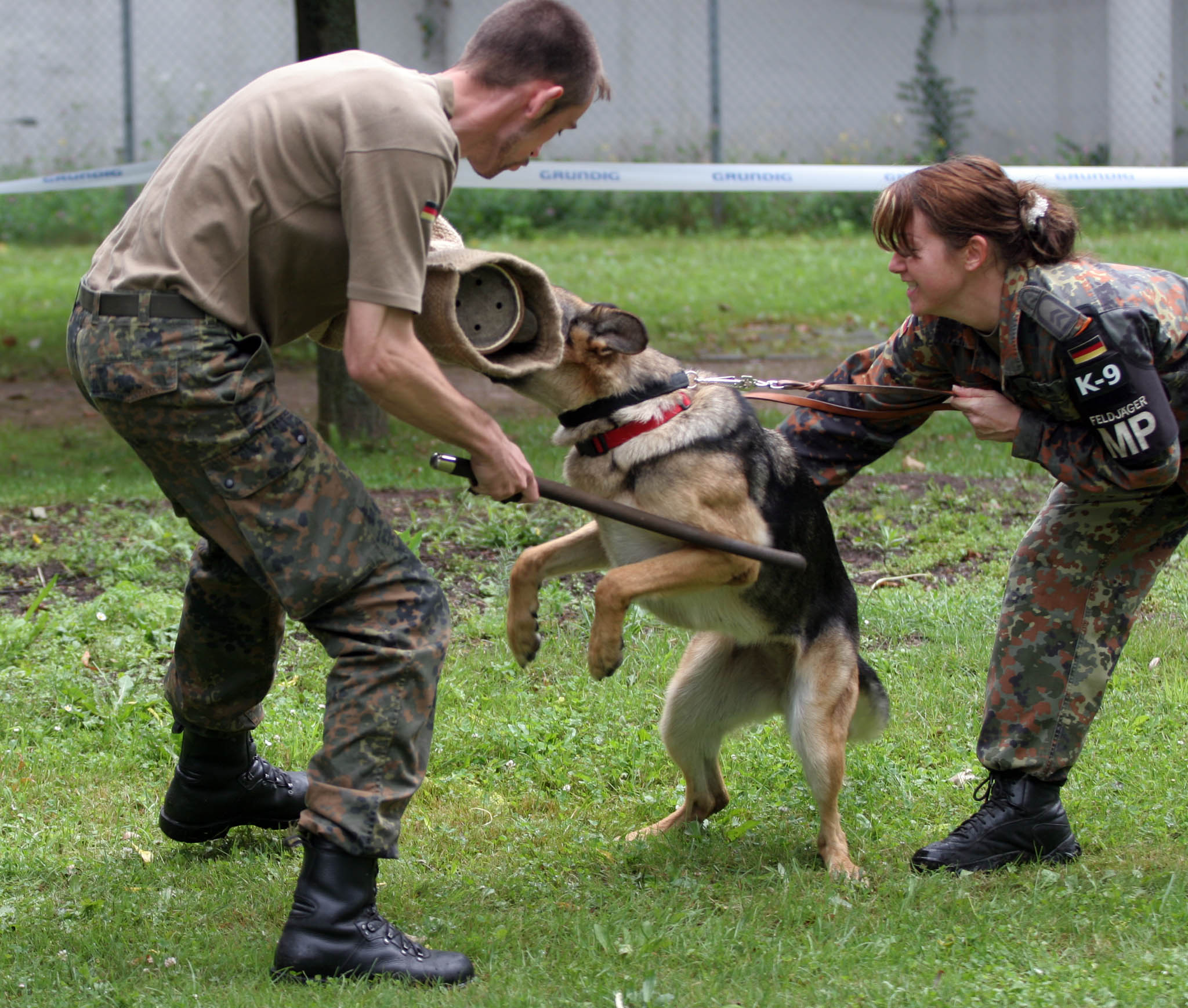
Feldjäger K-9 exercise.

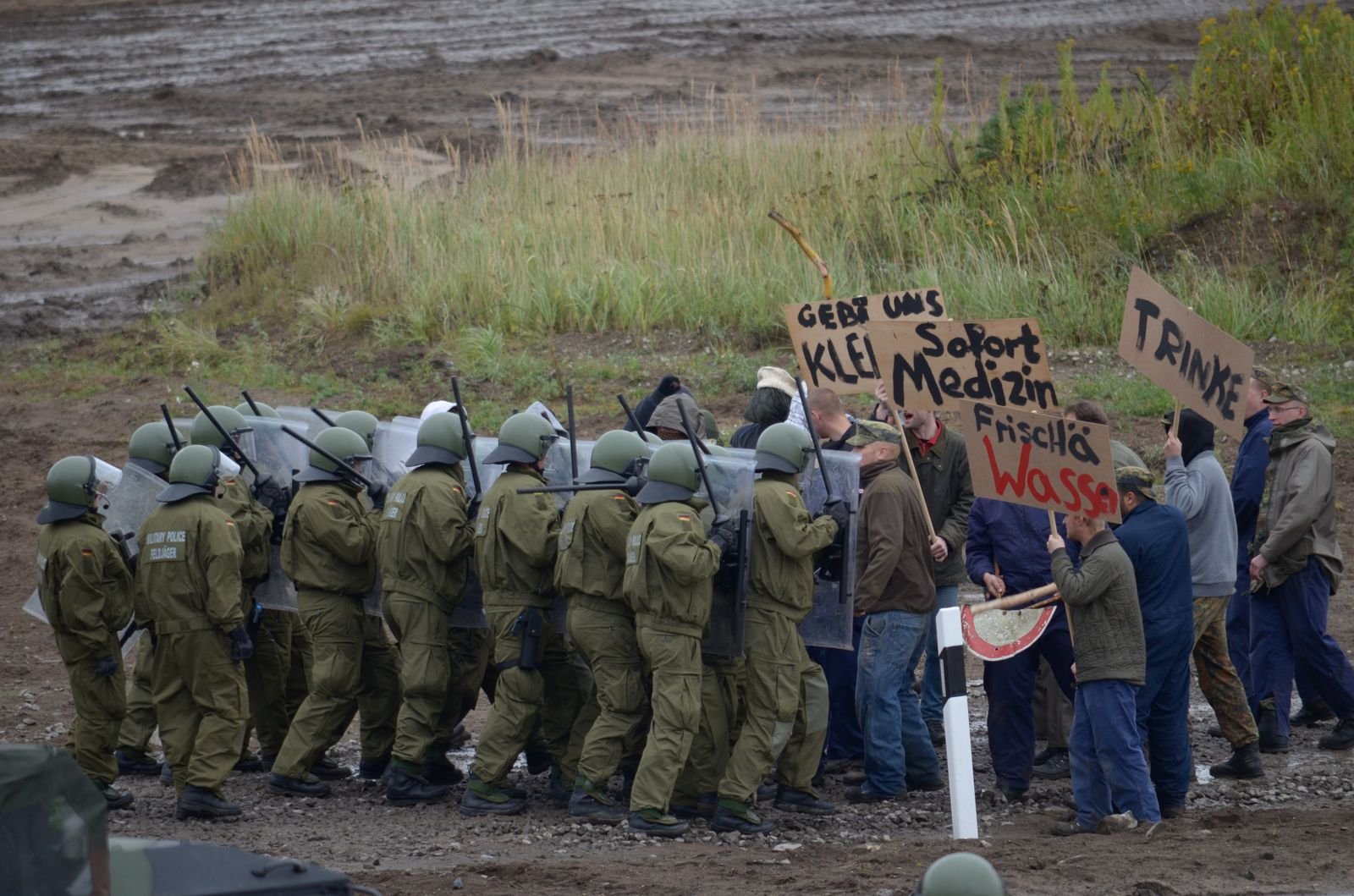
Feldjäger riot control exercise.

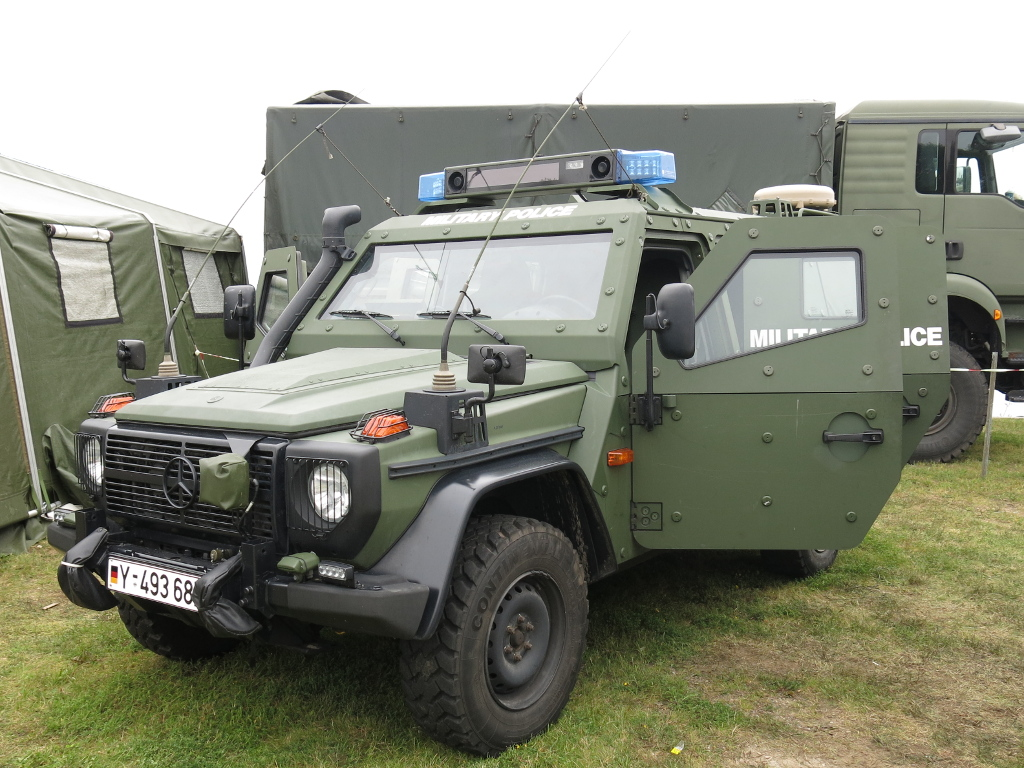
A LAPV Enok of the Feldjäger.

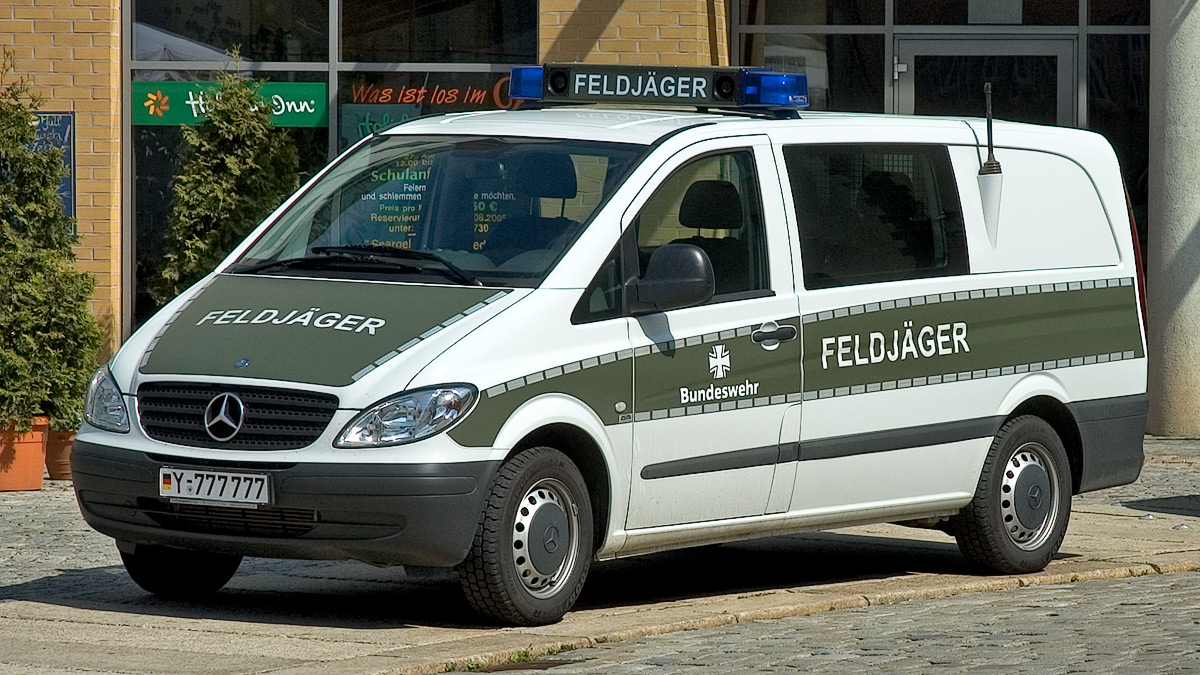
Feldjäger Mercedes-Benz Vito patrol vehicle.

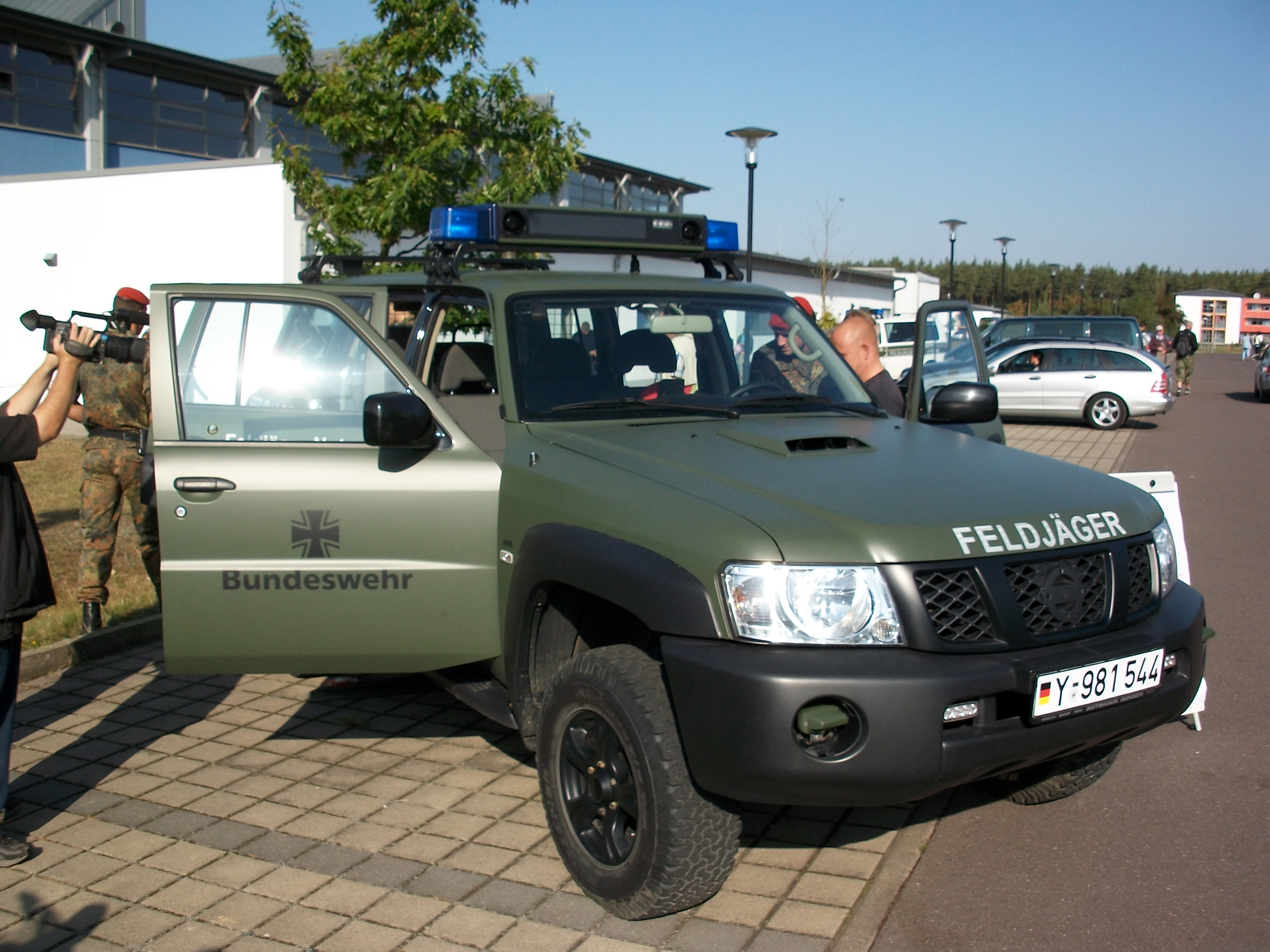
Feldjäger Nissan Patrol.

The Feldjäger (German: [ˈfɛltˌjɛːɡɐ]) are Germany's military police. The term Feldjäger, literally meaning field huntsmen or field Jäger, has a long tradition and dates back to the mid-17th century.

== History ==
The first modern Feldjäger unit was activated on 6 October 1955 when the bill creating the Bundeswehr was signed. The new law called for a military police training company to be established at the former Luftwaffe hospital in Andernach. The original intention was to call the military police units of the Bundeswehr "Militärpolizei", literally military police. However, objections arose on the part of the federal states which had been given the mission of law enforcement. They wanted the use of the word "Polizei" to be unique to them and so the name was changed to Feldjäger in 1956.

== Organization ==
The Feldjäger corps serves all component forces of the Bundeswehr i.e., German Army, German Navy, German Air Force and Cyber and Information Domain Service. The Feldjäger has its headquarters in Scharnhorst Kaserne in Hanover and is under the operational command of the Bundeswehr's Territorial Tasks Command of the Streitkräftebasis. The Feldjäger have three regiments of military police stationed around Germany which are subordinate to the Military Police Command as is the Feldjäger School which is also in Hanover, but in the Hauptfeldwebel-Lagenstein-Kaserne (previously Emmich-Cambrai-Kaserne).

== Missions ==
The 24 Feldjäger police detachments located throughout Germany work around the clock to perform the Feldjägers' main mission which is to be a central point of contact for all soldiers who need assistance. There is a nationwide emergency phone number (0800 190 9999) so Bundeswehr soldiers can contact their nearest Feldjäger detachment at any time.

The Feldjäger also have four more missions: Maintaining military discipline and order, military traffic control, security operations and investigations.

=== Military discipline ===
To maintain military discipline, the Feldjäger perform regular patrols on-post and at places where Bundeswehr personnel congregate. They also patrol at large military events, conduct checks in military installations, assist in collecting and returning stragglers and apprehended soldiers, support the military courts of justice, and assist in collecting and transporting prisoners of war.

=== Controlling military traffic ===
When directing and controlling military traffic, Feldjäger work closely with the civilian police to improve traffic safety and protect soldiers. Feldjäger traffic missions therefore include route reconnaissance and marking of convoy routes, preparing reports on road accidents with Bundeswehr involvement, directing and controlling military traffic, escorting military oversize or hazardous material vehicles, assisting with the planning and supervision of military traffic, safety checks on military hazardous material vehicles, and setting up military traffic networks.

=== Security operations ===
Feldjäger security operations prevent crimes against the German Federal Armed Forces and prevent illegal disturbances of official Bundeswehr ceremonies. In addition, Feldjäger can be tasked to protect allied armed forces and provide personal security protection for high-risk Bundeswehr officials. They also secure the command posts of large units, escort VIPs, safeguard conferences and exhibitions, secure military property, assist commanders in physical security matters, and perform riot control missions.

=== Investigations and inquiries ===
Investigations and inquiries range from reporting serious accidents, analyzing matters of official interest, assisting in the investigation of military offenses, and searching for AWOLs. The Feldjäger corps also has military working dog (MWD) teams. The dogs are first trained to be patrol dogs and then as sniffer dogs at the Bundeswehr MWD school in Ulmen, around 60 km west of Koblenz. Their teams assist in the search for explosives and drugs.

== Overseas deployments ==
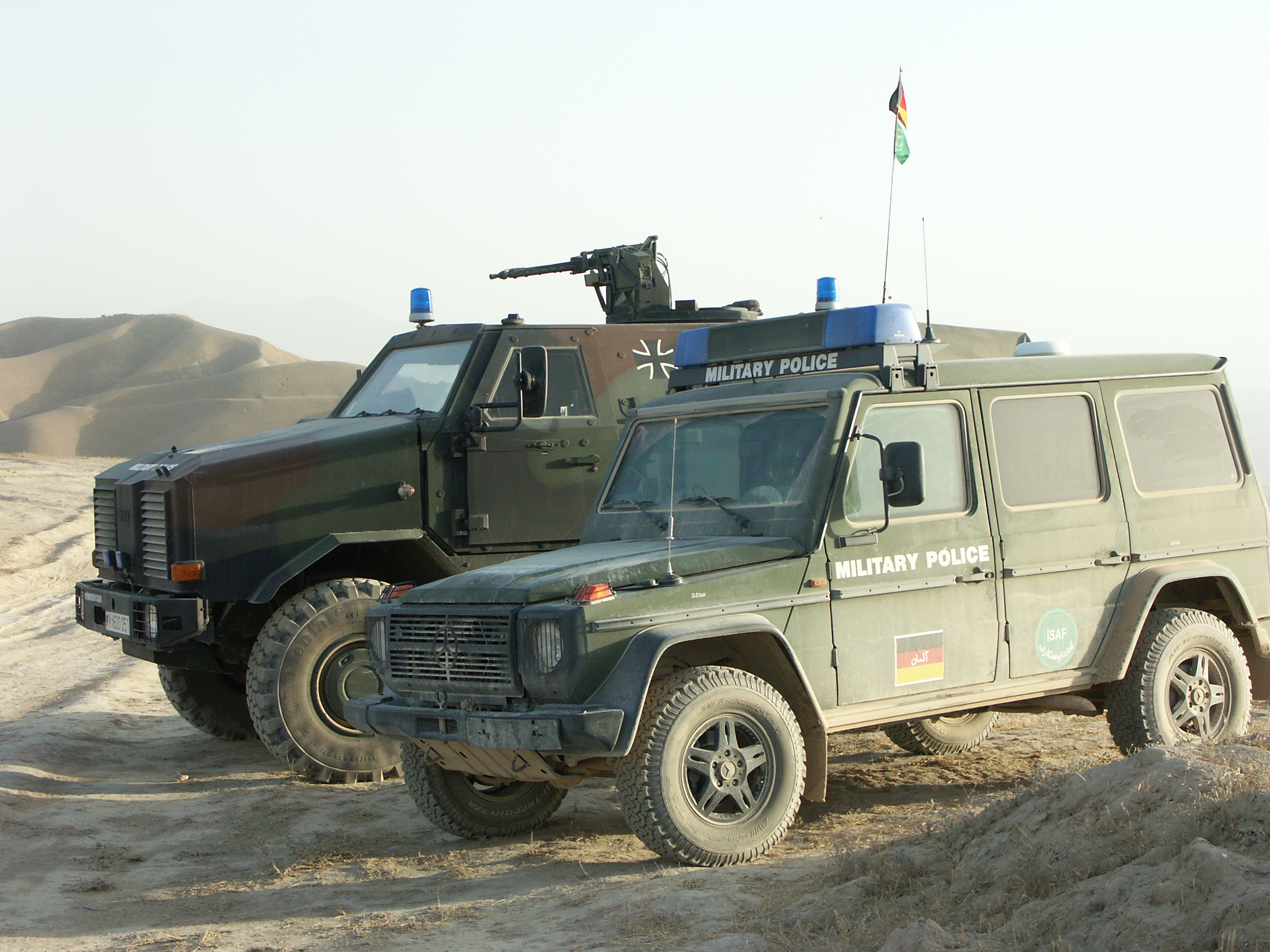
Feldjäger deployed units in Afghanistan.

On overseas deployments, Feldjäger support the respective contingent by performing military police tasks. They are frequently employed in multinational military police units and not only monitor the behaviour of German soldiers in the area of operations, they also cooperate closely with local authorities, police, organizations, or the military police of other states under the Charter of the United Nations. House searches for illegal weapons and explosives are the day-to-day business in foreign deployments. One mission only performed overseas, for example, is the airport security and border clearance mission.

== Training ==
To be able to conduct these missions, Feldjäger soldiers are sent to numerous training courses at the Feldjäger School in Hannover or to specialist courses with the civilian police. One course that all Feldjäger must complete is the proficiency test in English, which makes them excellent liaison officers when dealing with other MP forces.

== Uniform ==
The Feldjäger, although a joint force, wear Army uniforms because they originated as an Army branch of service. They wear red berets with a badge derived from the Prussian Order of the Black Eagle, with the motto Suum Cuique (Latin meaning "To each his own," a phrase derived from Cicero), as their branch of service emblem. The collar patches and shoulder straps are piped in orange which is the Feldjäger branch colour.

For routine patrol missions, the Feldjäger wear the normal flecktarn camouflage uniform with "Schwarzzeug" (black gear) meaning a black MP brassard, with the legend Feldjäger in smaller letters, as well as a black belt with black holster, black handcuff holder etc. However, for representative purposes, e.g. parades, ceremonies and the motorcycle escort for senior officers, Weißzeug is worn. This is the older leather "white gear" worn before the Schwarzzeug, i.e., white belt, white gloves and a white holster worn on the left side of the belt in the tradition of sword carrying soldiers.

== Jurisdiction ==
In Germany, the Feldjäger only have jurisdiction over soldiers, civil employees of the Federal Armed Forces, and any civilian who enters a military compound. The Feldjäger also hold authority over any civilian who enters military jurisdiction if there is some issue of federal security or federal jurisdiction. The Feldjäger will also apprehend those violating local laws on local military posts.

== Feldgendarmerie ==
The Feldgendarmerie (roughly translating to "Field Police") were the military police units of the armies of the German Empire (including the Wehrmacht) from post-Napoleonic times to the conclusion of World War II.

== See also ==
- Feldgendarmerie
- Feldjägerkorps
- Geheime Feldpolizei
