= Hugo von Kayser =

German general (1873–1949)

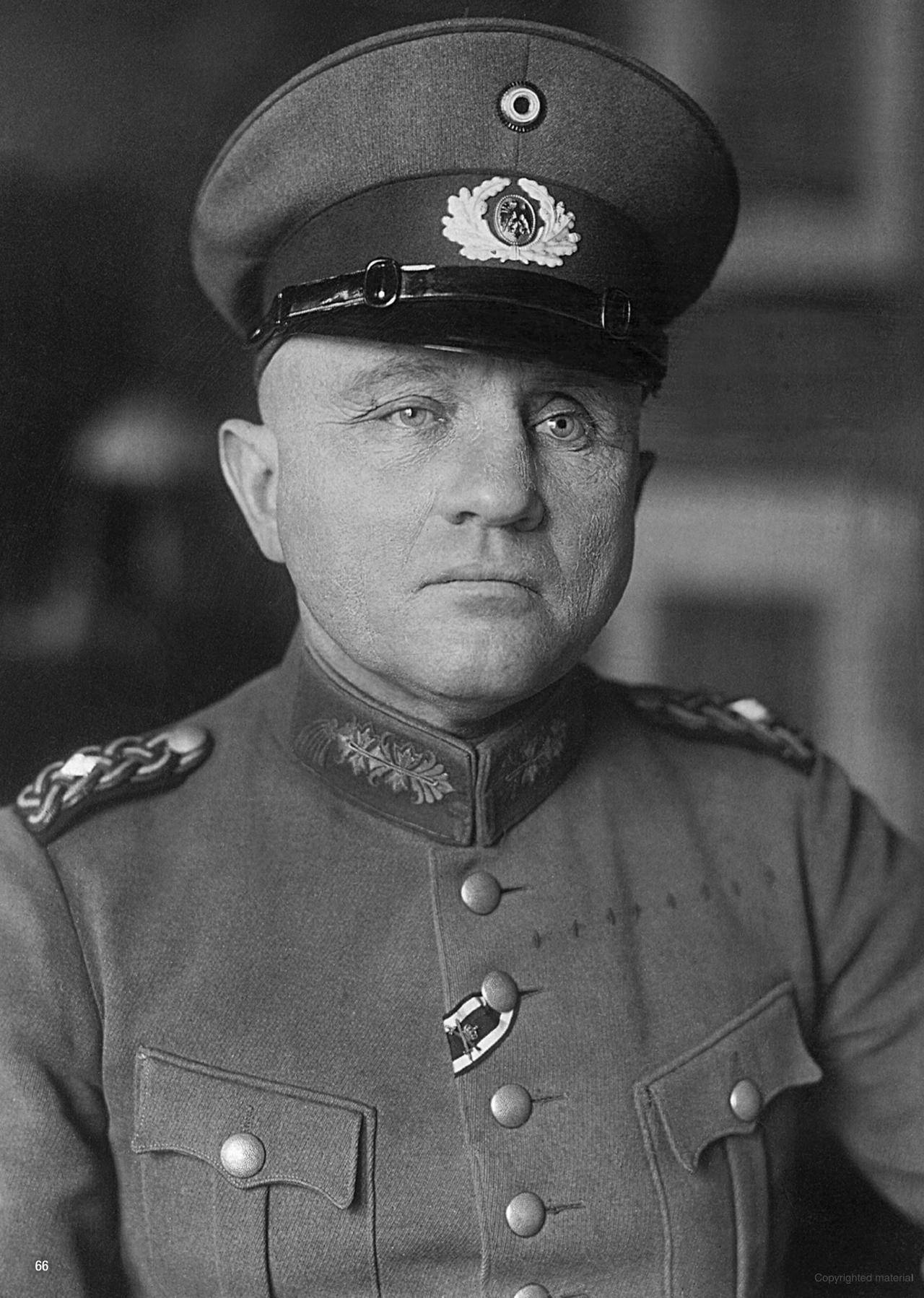
- Born: 15 June 1873; Koblenz, Rhine, Prussia, Germany
- Died: 23 September 1949 (aged 76); Braunschweig, Lower Saxony, West Germany
- Military career
- Allegiance: German Empire; Weimar Republic
- Branch: Imperial German Army; Reichsheer
- Service years: 1890 – 1931
- Rank: General of the Cavalry
- Commands: 2nd Cavalry Division
- Conflicts: World War I

Hugo Max von Kayser (15 June 1873 – 23 September 1949) was a German General of the Cavalry of World War I. He was known for being a major military figure of the Reichswehr after the war's conclusion, commanding the 2nd Cavalry Division.

== Origin ==
Hugo was born on 15 June 1873 as the son of the Prussian Colonel Edwin von Kayser (1836–1887) and his wife Klara (née von Ulrici) (1848–1921). His father had been elevated to the hereditary Prussian nobility on 14 August 1864.

== Early Military Career ==
On 24 February 1890 Kayser enlisted in the hussar regiment "von Zieten" (Brandenburg) No. 3 in Rathenow as a cadet and was promoted to Second Lieutenant on 19 September 1891. At the end of January 1897, he was transferred to the 1st Hessian Hussar Regiment No. 13 in Frankfurt am Main and served as regimental adjutant from November 1897 to early April 1902. For his service, the Italian king Vittorio Emmanuele III awarded him the Knight's Cross of the Order of St. Mauritius and Lazarus and the Order of the Crown of Italy. With the uniform of his regiment, Kayser was promoted to First Lieutenant and from mid-September 1904, served as a Rittmeister Adjutant of the 4th Cavalry Brigade in Bromberg. This was followed on 18 August 1905 by his transfer as squadron chief to the Thuringian Hussar Regiment No. 12 in Torgau. Promoted to Major, he became Adjutant of the 1st Cavalry Inspection in Posen on 22 April 1912. From 18 April 1913 to 30 September 1913 Kayser was with the staff of the Hussar Regiment "von Zieten" (Brandenburg) No. 3 and then acted as commander of the Officer Riding School in Paderborn.

== World War I ==
With the German entry into World War I, Kayser was initially appointed commander of the Reserve Hussar Regiment No. 5 and took part in the fighting on the Western Front in conjunction with the 13th Reserve Division. The following year he commanded the Uhlan Regiment "Emperor Alexander II of Russia" (1st Brandenburg) No. 3 . From 15 April to 4 May 1916, he commanded the Reserve Hussar Regiment No. 5 and then commander of the Reserve Infantry Regiment No. 16. After Kayser had already received both classes of the Iron Cross, he was awarded the Knight's Cross of the House Order of Hohenzollern with Swords at the end of May 1918. He was also a recipient of the Military Merit Order. As a lieutenant colonel, he was appointed commander of the hussar regiment "von Zieten" (Brandenburg) No. 3 in mid-January 1918. This was followed by 1 August 1918, when he was used as commander of the 14th Cavalry Rifle Command on the western front, and in this position Kayser was seriously wounded on 3 September 1918.

== Reichswehr ==
Kayser experienced the end of the war in the hospital and after his recovery in mid-February 1919, he was again given command of the hussar regiment "von Zieten" (Brandenburg) No. 3, and after the dissolution of the association on 1 August 1919 he was commanded to serve at the Ministry of War. On 1 October 1919 he was transferred to the Ministry with his appointment as Chief of Staff of the Cavalry Inspection. With seniority on 1 October 1920, Kayser was promoted to Colonel on 18 December 1920. From October 1921 to the end of December 1925, he was commander of the cavalry school of the Reichswehr in Hanover rose to the rank of Generalmajor and subsequently became commander of the 2nd Cavalry Division in Breslau. On 1 October 1926 Kayser moved again to the Reichswehr Ministry with the appointment of Inspector of Cavalry and was promoted to Generalleutnant on 1 February 1927. Promoted to General of the Cavalry, he was finally appointed Commander-in-Chief of the 2nd Group Command in Kassel on 1 December 1929. On 30 November 1931, Kayser retired with permission to wear the uniform of the 3rd (Prussian) Cavalry Regiment. He was also a Knight of Honor of the Order of St. John.
