= Smardzewo, West Pomeranian Voivodeship =

Smardzewo
- Village
- Location within Poland
- Coordinates: 54°18′14″N 16°37′31″E
- Country: Poland
- Voivodeship: West Pomeranian
- County: Sławno
- Gmina: Gmina Sławno
- Population: 378

Smardzewo [smarˈd͡zɛvɔ] (German Schmarsow) is a village in the administrative district of Gmina Sławno, within Sławno County, West Pomeranian Voivodeship, in north-western Poland. It lies approximately 8 km (5 mi) south-west of Sławno and 167 km (104 mi) north-east of the regional capital Szczecin.

For the history of the region, see History of Pomerania.

The village has a population of 378.

== Notable residents ==
- Wilhelm Bohnstedt (1888–1947), general
