= Otto Hartmann (general) =

German general (1884–1952)

- Born: 11 September 1884; Munich, Kingdom of Bavaria, German Empire
- Died: 10 July 1952 (aged 67); Miesbach, Bavaria, West Germany
- Military career
- Allegiance: German Empire; Weimar Republic; Nazi Germany
- Branch: Army
- Service years: 1903–1945
- Rank: General der Artillerie
- Commands: 7. Infanterie-Division; XXX. Armeekorps
- Conflicts: World War I World War II: Battle of France; Battle of Greece; Battle of Metaxas Line
- Awards: Knight's Cross of the Iron Cross

Otto Hartmann (11 September 1884 – 10 July 1952) was a German general in the Wehrmacht during World War II. He was a recipient of the Knight's Cross of the Iron Cross of Nazi Germany.

== Family ==
Otto Hartmann was born on 11 September 1884 in Munich in the Kingdom of Bavaria as the son of Generalmajor Richard Hartmann and Rose Maria, née Schönlin. He was married in 1911 to Franziska, née Steger. The couple had one daughter and one son.

== Military career ==
=== Royal Bavarian Army ===
Hartmann passed out of the Bavarian Cadet Corps and entered the 10. Feldartillerie-Regiment of the Royal Bavarian Army in Erlangen as a Fähnrich (officer candidate) on 6 July 1903. He was commissioned a Leutnant on 8 March 1905. He was promoted to Oberleutnant on 28 October 1912 and sent to the Bavarian War Academy on 1 October 1913 for general staff training.

Hartmann's course of instruction was interrupted by the outbreak of World War I and he returned to his regiment in the field on 8 August 1914. On 24 August 1914, he was assigned as an aide-de-camp on the staff of the Bavarian 5th Field Artillery Brigade and then from 16 September 1914 as 2nd adjutant of the 5th Bavarian Infantry Division. He was promoted to Hauptmann on 14 January 1916 and on 19 June 1916 he was sent to the 1st Bavarian Landwehr Division to serve as the division's 2nd General Staff Officer.

On 11 September 1917, he was sent to the Ottoman Empire and tasked as an Ottoman general staff major, first on the general staff of the Yildirim Army Group, also called Army Group F, and then from 25 November 1917 on the general staff of the Ottoman 6th Army. From 21 February to 13 May 1918, he was on the general staff of the Ottoman XIII Army Corps. On 4 June 1918, Hartmann was assigned to the general staff of the Ottoman Eastern Army Group as Oberquartiermeister. On 25 October 1918, he was sent back to the Western Front in France and on 1 November he became 3rd General Staff Officer on the general staff of the XV Royal Bavarian Reserve Corps.

=== Interwar Years ===
After the end of World War I, Hartmann remained in service in the Reichswehr, serving primarily as a staff officer. On 26 September 1919, he received a backdated Patent as Hauptmann of 24 December 1914. In May 1920 he was assigned as a staff officer on the staff of Wehrkreiskommando VII (Military District Command VII) in Munich. On 1 October 1921, he was sent to the staff of the City Commandant of Munich and in the following year to the staff of the Reichswehr's 7th Division. On 1 February 1922, his seniority date as Hauptmann in the Reichshwehr was fixed at 8 November 1914.

On 1 October 1922, Hartmann was transferred to the 7. (Bayerisches) Artillerie-Regiment as a battery commander. From 16 October 1924, he was commanded to the staff of the 7th Division. While remaining in his assignment to the 7th Division, he was transferred on 1 April 1925 to the staff of Group Command 2. On 1 February 1926, he was promoted to Major, and on 1 October 1926, he was transferred to the Ministry of the Reichswehr, where he served as an intelligence and counterintelligence officer. On 1 November 1930, he was promoted to Oberstleutnant.

Hartmann was transferred to the staff of the 7. (Bayerisches) Artillerie-Regiment on 1 October 1931 but one year later returned to the intelligence section of the Ministry of the Reichswehr. In this capacity, he underwent preparation for military attaché duties and on 1 April 1933 he was promoted to Oberst and assigned as military attaché at the German Embassy in Moscow. His duties included gathering information on the Soviet Army, but also facilitating the secret cooperation between the Reichswehr and the Soviet Army prior to German rearmament. On 30 September 1935, Hartmann's activity in Moscow came to an end and he passed on his responsibilities to his successor Ernst-August Köstring, who took over the position on 1 October.

Hartmann returned from the USSR in October 1935. Initially placed at the disposal of the Supreme Command of the Army, he was named Artillerie-Kommandeur 1 on 15 October 1935. On 1 April 1936, he was promoted to Generalmajor, and later in the year on 12 November 1936 given command of the 7th Infantry Division. On 1 March 1938, he was promoted to Generalleutnant.

=== World War II ===
With the 26 August 1939 mobilization of the Wehrmacht for World War II, Hartmann was given command of the newly-formed XXX. Armeekorps. The corps was assigned to Army Detachment A on the Lower Rhine along the border with the Netherlands, and later to the 1st Army along the Saar front opposed to the Maginot Line. On 1 April 1940, Hartmann was promoted to General der Artillerie and formally named commanding general of the corps. At the start of the Battle of France, the corps initially remained on the defensive, with the goal of tying down French forces, and then from 12 June 1940 commenced offensive operations against the Maginot Line, fighting in France until the Armistice of 22 June 1940.

On 5 August 1940, Hartmann was decorated with the Knight's Cross of the Iron Cross in recognition of his command's performance. In the meantime, the corps had been transferred first to occupied Poland and then, in January 1941, to Bulgaria. Due to serious illness after a reaction to a typhus immunization, Hartmann was hospitalized in early 1941 and thus left the corps before the start of the campaign against Greece. He was transferred to the Führerreserve (Leaders Reserve) of the OKH on 9 May 1941.

At the end of 1942 he was cleared for duty and he was named Commanding General of Security Troops and Commander in Army Area A on 1 January 1943. On 17 September 1943 he was again transferred to the Führerreserve. From February 1944, he served as commander of the Special Staff Hartmann under the Supreme Command Southwest (Oberbefehlshaber Südwest) and Army Group C. On 2 May 1945, Hartmann went into Allied captivity.

=== Later years ===
Hartmann remained in Allied captivity until 4 Januar 1947. He died on 10 July 1952 in Miesbach, Bavaria.

== Decorations and awards ==
- Kingdom of Prussia:
  - Iron Cross 2nd Class (14 November 1914)
  - Iron Cross 1st Class (23 November 1916)
- Kingdom of Bavaria:
  - Jubilee Medal of the Bavarian Army (12 March 1905)
  - Military Merit Order, 4th class with Crown and Swords (24 June 1918)
- Nazi Germany:
  - Honour Cross of the World War 1914/1918 (18 December 1934)
  - Wehrmacht Long Service Award, 4th to 1st Class (2 October 1936)
  - Anschluss Medal (21 November 1938)
  - 1939 Clasp to the Iron Cross 2nd Class
  - 1939 Clasp to the Iron Cross 1st Class
  - Knight's Cross of the Iron Cross on 5 August 1940 as General der Artillerie and Commanding General of XXX. Armeekorps
- Ottoman Empire:
  - Liakat Medal in Silver with Sabers (May 1918)
  - War Medal (so-called "Iron Crescent" or "Gallipoli Star") (27 January 1918)
- Kingdom of Romania: Order of the Crown of Romania, Grand Cross with Swords

Military offices
Preceded by Generalleutnant Franz Halder	Commander of 7. Infanterie-Division; 12 November 1936 – 31 July 1939	Succeeded by Generalmajor Eugen Ott
Preceded by None	Commander of XXX. Armeekorps; 26 August 1939 – 25 March 1941	Succeeded by Generalleutnant Eugen Ott
