= Jedem das Seine =

German language idiom

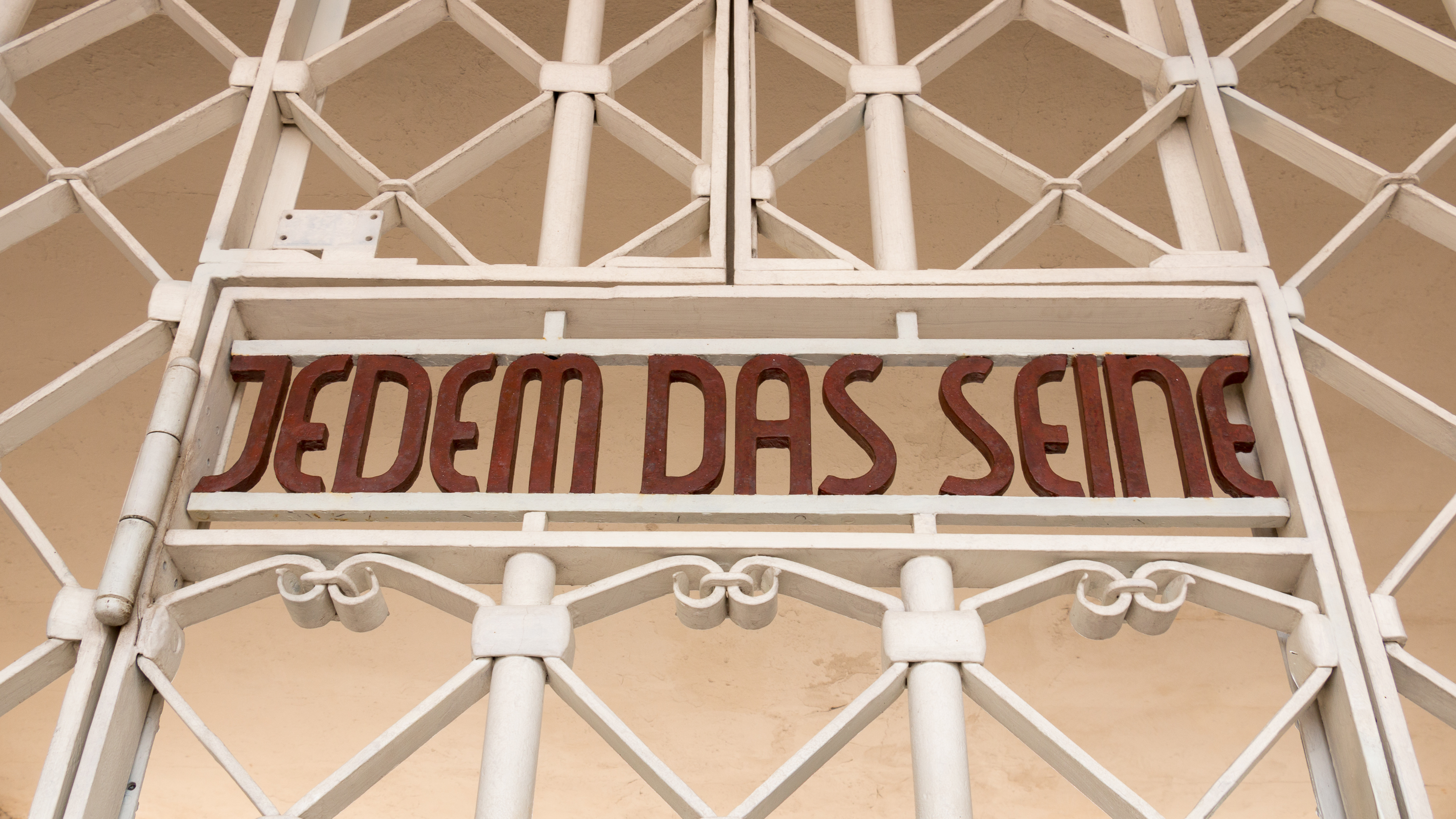
The main gate of Buchenwald concentration camp, showing the motto Jedem das Seine.

"Jedem das Seine" (German pronunciation: [ˈjeːdm̩ das ˈzaɪnə]) is the literal German translation of the Latin phrase suum cuique, meaning "to each his own" or "to each what he deserves".

During World War II the phrase was contemptuously used by the Nazis as a motto displayed over the entrance of Buchenwald concentration camp. This has resulted in use of the phrase being considered controversial in modern Germany.

== History ==
Jedem das Seine has been an idiomatic German expression for several centuries. For example, it is found in the works of priest, theologian, author, hymnwriter, professor, and former Augustinian friar Martin Luther and contemporaries.

It appears in the title of a cantata by Johann Sebastian Bach, Nur jedem das Seine (BWV 163), first performed at Weimar in 1715.

Some nineteenth-century comedies bear the title Jedem das Seine, including works by Johann Friedrich Rochlitz and Caroline Bernstein.

An ironic twist on the proverb, "jedem das Seine, mir das Meiste" ("to each his own, to me the most"), has been known in the reservoir of German idioms for a long time, including its inclusion in Carl Zuckmayer's 1931 play The Captain of Köpenick.

In 1937, the Nazis constructed the Buchenwald concentration camp, 7 km from Weimar, Germany. The motto Jedem das Seine was placed in the camp's main entrance gate. The gates were designed by Franz Ehrlich, a former student of the Bauhaus art school, who had been imprisoned in the camp because he was a communist.

== Controversies ==
Several modern advertising campaigns in the German language, including ads for Nokia, REWE grocery stores, Burger King, and Merkur Bank, have been marred by controversy after using the phrase Jedem das Seine or Jedem den Seinen.

An ExxonMobil ad campaign in January 2009 touted Tchibo coffee drinks at the company's Esso stores with the slogan Jedem den Seinen! The ads were withdrawn after protest from the Central Council of Jews in Germany, and a company spokesman said its advertising contractor had been unaware of the proverb's association with Nazism.

In March 2009, a student group associated with the Christian Democratic Union used the slogan for an education campaign in North Rhine-Westphalia (Germany), but later withdrew it due to public outcry.

In May 2018, the German fashion and clothing chain Peek & Cloppenburg used the slogan in an advertising flyer. After public criticism, a company spokeswoman said Peek & Cloppenburg regretted the advertisement but also defended the decision to use the phrase, pointing to its origin in ancient Greek philosophy and its continued use in German courthouses as part of inscribed formulas of justice. At the same time, she described the company's oversight of the phrase's Nazi-era misuse as a "verbal clumsiness," while adding that the company understood the criticism and apologized for having hurt people's feelings, stating this had not been their intention.

== See also ==
- Extermination through labour
- Arbeit macht frei (idiomatically, "work sets you free"), a motto used at Auschwitz and other concentration camps.
