= Erich Buschenhagen =

German general (1895–1994)

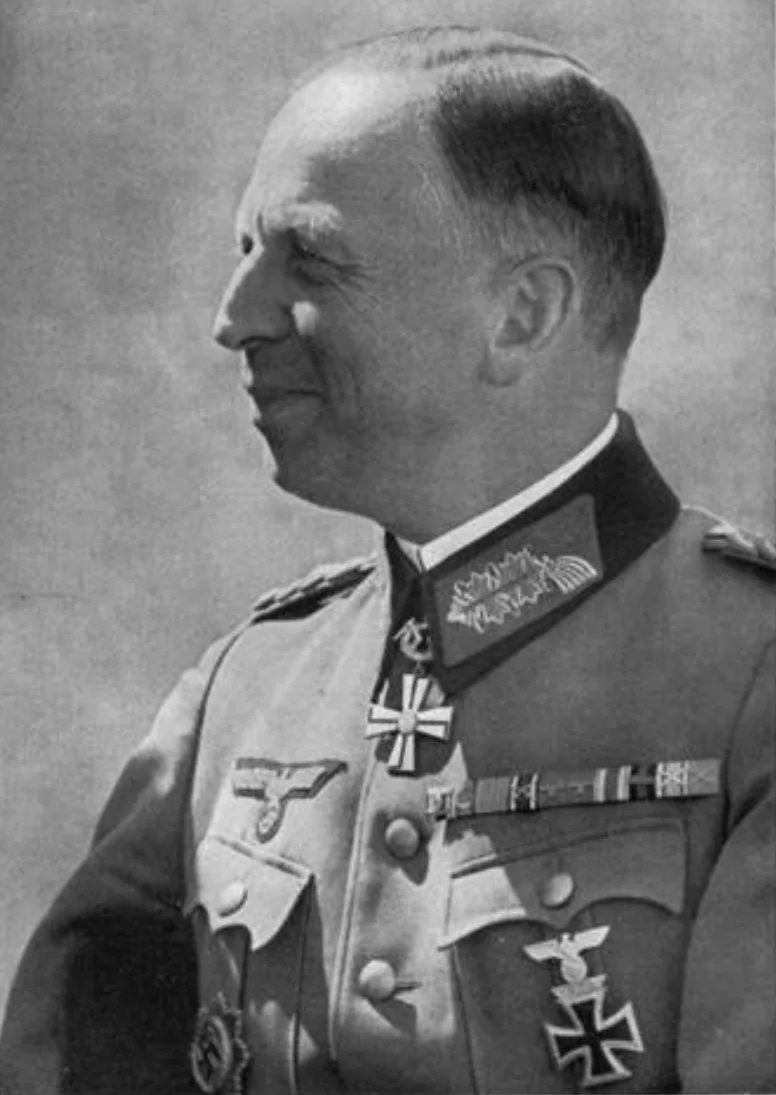
- Born: 8 December 1895; Straßburg
- Died: 13 September 1994 (aged 98); Kronberg
- Military career
- Allegiance: German Empire; Weimar Republic; Nazi Germany
- Branch: German Army
- Service years: 1914–1945
- Rank: General der Infanterie
- Commands: 15th Infantry Division; LII Army Corps
- Conflicts: World War I; World War II; Annexation of Austria; Annexation of the Sudetenland; Invasion of Poland; Operation Weserübung; Lower Dnieper Offensive; Dnieper–Carpathian Offensive; Jassy–Kishinev Offensive (August 1944)
- Awards: Knight's Cross of the Iron Cross with Oak Leaves

Erich Buschenhagen (December 8, 1895 – September 13, 1994) was a German general in the Wehrmacht of Nazi Germany who commanded the LII Corps during World War II. He was a recipient of the Knight's Cross of the Iron Cross with Oak Leaves. Buschenhagen surrendered to the Soviet forces in August 1944, after the Jassy–Kishinev Offensive, and was held in the Soviet Union until October 1955.

== Awards and decorations ==
- Iron Cross – 2nd Class (November 22, 1914) & 1st Class (October 7, 1917)
- Clasp to the Iron Cross – 2nd Class (September 17, 1939) & 1st Class (September 26, 1939)
- German Cross in Gold on July 19, 1942 as Generalmajor in AOK Norwegen
- Knight's Cross of the Iron Cross with Oak Leaves
  - Knight's Cross on December 5, 1943 as Generalleutnant and commander of 15. Infanterie Division
  - Oak Leaves on July 4, 1944 as General der Infanterie and commander of LII. Armeekorps

Military offices
Preceded by Generalmajor Bronislaw Pawel	Commander of 15. Infanterie-Division; 18 June 1942 – 20 November 1943	Succeeded by Generalmajor Rudolf Sperl
Preceded by General der Infanterie Hans-Karl von Scheele	Commander of LII. Armeekorps; 20 November 1943 – 1 February 1944	Succeeded by General der Infanterie Rudolf von Bünau
Preceded by General der Infanterie Rudolf von Bünau	Commander of LII. Armeekorps; April–August 1944	Succeeded by None
