= LII Army Corps =

LII. Armeekorps
- Active: October 1940 – August 1944
- Country: Nazi Germany
- Branch: Army
- Size: Corps
- Engagements: World War II: Operation Barbarossa; Battle of Uman; Battle of Kiev (1941); Battle of the Caucasus; Battle of Kursk; Lower Dnieper Offensive; Dnieper–Carpathian Offensive; Jassy–Kishinev Offensive (August 1944)

Commanders
- Notable commanders: Kurt von Briesen; Erich Buschenhagen

LII Army Corps (LII. Armeekorps) was a corps in the German Army during World War II. The LII. Armeekorps was destroyed during the Jassy–Kishinev Offensive (August 1944).

== Commanders ==
- Infantry General (General der Infanterie) Kurt von Briesen, 25 November 1940 – 20 November 1941
- Lieutenant-General (Generalleutnant) Albert Zehler, 20 November 1941 – 10 December 1941
- Infantry General (General der Infanterie) Eugen Ott, 10 December 1941 – 1 October 1943
- Infantry General (General der Infanterie) Hans-Karl von Scheele, 1 October 1943 – 20 November 1943
- Infantry General (General der Infanterie) Erich Buschenhagen, 20 November 1943 – 1 February 1944
- Infantry General (General der Infanterie) Rudolf von Bünau, 1 February 1944 – 1 April 1944
- Infantry General (General der Infanterie) Erich Buschenhagen, 1 April 1944 – August 1944

== Area of operations ==
- Germany - November 1940 – June 1941
- Eastern Front, southern sector - June 1941 – August 1944

== See also ==
- List of German corps in World War II
