= Suum cuique =

Latin phrase meaning "to each his own"

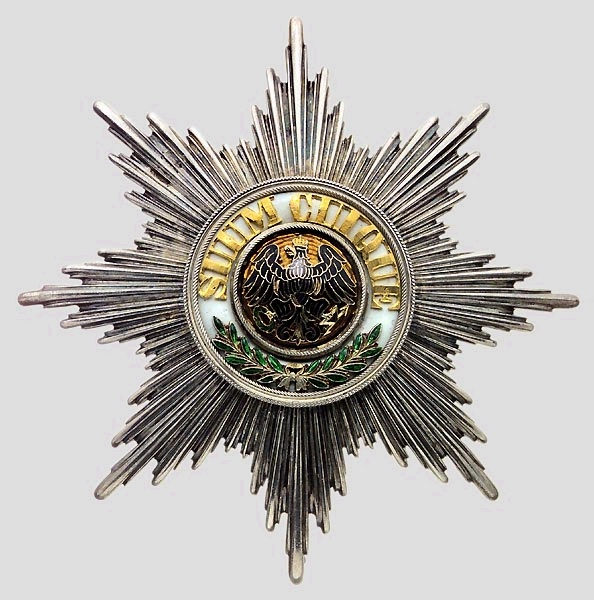
Medal of the Order of the Black Eagle, with the motto "SUUM CUIQUE" in the center.

"Suum cuique" (Classical Latin: [ˈsʊ.ũː ˈkui̯kᶣɛ]), or "Unicuique suum", is a Latin phrase often translated as "to each his own" or "may all get their due." Suum cuique has been significant in the history of philosophy and as a motto.

The English phrase "to each his own [deserts]" (suum cuique) is not to be confused with the similar phrase "each to his own [tastes]", which corresponds more closely to the Latin de gustibus non est disputandum (or the similar French expression "à chacun son goût").

== History ==
=== Antiquity ===
The Latin phrase relates to an old Greek principle of justice which translates into English as "to each his own". Plato, in Republic, offers the provisional definition that "justice is when everyone minds his own business, and refrains from meddling in others' affairs" (Greek: "...τὸ τὰ αὑτοῦ πράττειν καὶ μὴ πολυπραγμονεῖν δικαιοσύνη ἐστί...", 4.433a). Everyone should do according to his abilities and capabilities, to serve the country and the society as a whole. Also, everyone should receive "his own" (e.g., rights) and not be deprived of "his own" (e.g., property) (433e).

The Roman author, orator and politician Marcus Tullius Cicero (106 BC – 43 BC) popularised the Latin phrase:

- "Iustitia suum cuique distribuit." ("Justice renders to everyone his due.") – De Natura Deorum, III, 15.
- [...] ut fortitudo in laboribus periculisque cernatur, [...], iustitia in suo cuique tribuendo." (" [...] so that fortitude (courage) may be seen in hardship and danger, [...], justice in attributing to each his own".) – De Finibus Bonorum et Malorum, liber V, 67.

The phrase appears near the beginning of Justinian's Institutiones: iuris praecepta sunt haec: honeste vivere, alterum non laedere, suum cuique tribuere. (Inst. 1,1,3-4). (Translated into English: "the precepts of law are these: to live honestly, to injure no one, [and] to give to each his own".)

=== Motto ===
Suum cuique serves as the motto of the Order of the Black Eagle (German: Hoher Orden vom Schwarzen Adler; founded in 1701), the highest order of chivalry of the Kingdom of Prussia. The motto continues in use in Germany – in the insignia of the military police (the Feldjäger) and in association with the Berlin-based Masonic Lodge, Black Eagle Lodge (German: Johannisloge Zum schwarzen Adler). The common German translation of the phrase – Jedem das Seine – was written on the main gate of Nazi concentration camp Buchenwald, leading to the phrase being controversial in modern Germany.

The Faculty of Advocates in Scotland uses the motto Suum cuique. It was also the motto of the North Carolina Supreme Court until 1975, when it was changed to Suum cuique tribuere.

The phrase also serves as the motto of the Faculties of Law at Lund University and Uppsala University in Sweden, Faculty of Law at University of Warsaw in Poland, as well as the Faculty of Law of Federal University of Bahia in Brazil.

== In popular culture ==
Valentin Pikul's 1985 novel on the career of the French General Jean Victor Moreau (1763–1813), Kazhdomu svoyo, uses as its title a Russian translation of "suum cuique".

Snaut, one of the characters in Stanisław Lem's science fiction novel Solaris, uses the phrase in conversation with the character Kelvin.

"Suum Cuique" is the final song on the 2013 album Abandon All Life by the powerviolence band Nails.

On the TNT drama Animal Kingdom, the character Deran Cody has "Suum Cuique" tattooed on his left shoulder.

== See also ==
- Desert (philosophy)
- From each according to his ability, to each according to his need
- Jedem das Seine, a German translation of the phrase
- Just world fallacy
- To each according to his contribution
