= 7th Infantry Division (Wehrmacht) =

1934-1945 combat formation of the German Army

- German: 7. Infanterie-Division
- Unit insignia
- Active: 1 October 1934 – 8 May 1945
- Country: Nazi Germany
- Branch: German Army
- Type: Infantry
- Size: Division
- Garrison/HQ: Munich
- Nickname: Bavarian Division
- Engagements: World War II

Commanders
- Notable commanders: Franz Halder

The 7th Infantry Division (7. Infanterie-Division) was a formation of the German Wehrmacht during World War II.

== History ==
The division was formed 1 October 1934 in Munich from the Artillerieführer VII staff and renamed 7. Infanterie-Division with the disclosure of German rearmament on 15 October 1935. In preparation of the Invasion of Poland, the division was deployed to the Slovak Republik on 1 August 1939.

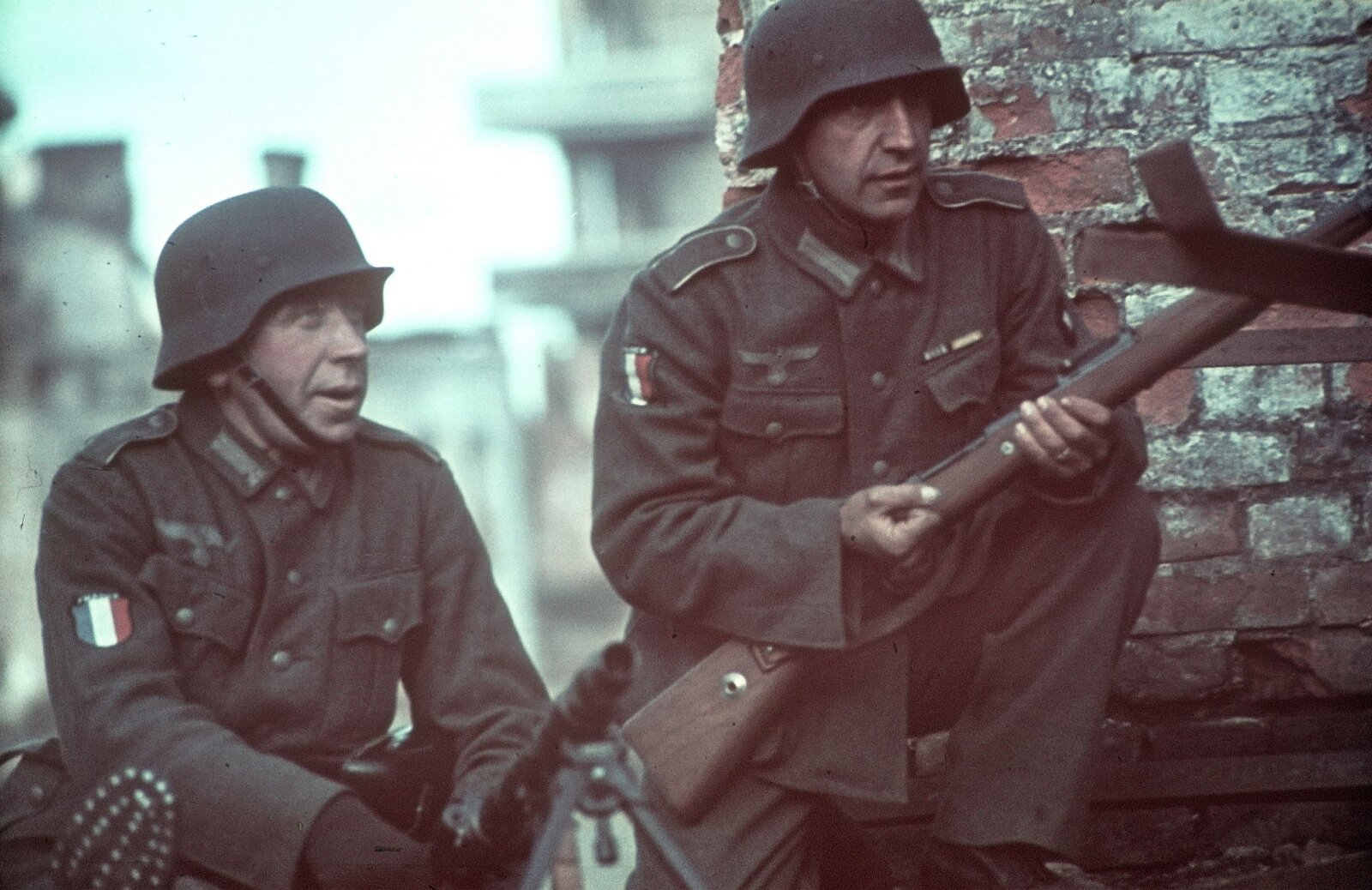
Soldiers of the 638th Infantry Regiment (LVF), then under 7th Infantry Division, on the Eastern Front in 1941

During its fight on the Eastern Front, the 7th Infantry Division at times oversaw the 638th Infantry Regiment, better known as the Legion of French Volunteers Against Bolshevism.

The division surrendered to Soviet forces near Stutthof after the unconditional surrender of 8 May 1945.

== Combat ==
On 26 August 1939, the division was mobilized.

From 1 September 1939, the Division took part in the Polish campaign. It came across the Jablunka Pass and the Zwardon saddle. It participated in battles over Dumajec and the conquest followed of Przemysl. After the Polish campaign, the division was moved westwards.

On 10 May 1940 the division took part in the French campaign over Leuven and Tournai. The division advanced into the Scheldt sector and then took part in the first battle of the Scheldt. The division then crossed the Lys and fought for Lille. After France, the division remained as an occupying force in Northern France.

On 22 June 1941, the division took part in Operation Barbarossa. From Bialystok the division went to Minsk, then to Mogilev and to Roslavl. This was followed by the defensive battle at Yelnya, then offensive battles on the Nara and the Advance against Moscow. After the start of the Russian winter offensive, the division was in the area of Schellkowka - Dorokhovo.

At the beginning of 1942, the division moved to the Nara and then to the Gshatsk position.

In 1943, the division was performing defensive operations against the Soviet counteroffensive known as Operation Kutuzov and then retreated across the Desna and the Dnieper Gomel.

In 1944, the retreat followed through the Pripjet swamps, via Pinsk and Bielsk to the Bug. Then the division took part in the battles between Bug and Narew part.

At the beginning of 1945, the division fought in the Vlosava - Vegrow area. After defensive battles at Castenburg, retreat battles followed between Narew and the lower Vistula via Zichenau - Thorn - Graudenz on Danzig.

After the start After the Red Army's Vistula-Oder operation on 12 January 1945, the 7th Infantry Regiment was formed. The division pushed into the Great Werder on the Bay of Danzig. The division suffered heavy losses.

In mid-January 1945, the Division to erect a barrier on the Nogat. On 24.

In January 1945, the division had taken over the sector. In the meantime, the Divisional Staff the "Group of Rappard", also known as the "Corps Group of Rappard" denoted. In addition to the units of the 7th Infantry Division, he was also responsible for Air Force and Navy units engaged in ground combat and worn-out army units.

On January 26, 1945, the Red Army essential parts of the 2nd armse, including the "Rappard Group" in the estuary of the Vistula. Abandonment of the encircled troops was responsible for defending the important Baltic Sea ports of Danzig and Gotenhafen.

Between 20 and 25 February 1945, the staff of the "Group von Rappard", the bunker camp built by pioneers in the dunes near Steegen. In In the following days, the units of the group suffered up to 50% losses.

From mid-March 1945, the group was renamed the 7th Infantry Division denoted.

On March 15, 1945, engineers of the division blew up the eastern Vistula dams near Rothebude. Large parts of the water below the water level of the Vistula lowlands were flooded. Through these floods in the northern Marienburg Werder, the fighting limited you for the time being mainly on reconnaissance and shock troop operations. As a result, the Grenadier regiments of the Division for the Battle of Danzig and the Division remained with the regimental units in their previous positions. It was also subordinate to alarm and replacement units as well as Marine Rifle Battalions.

In the first half of April, the battalion strength, the grenadier regiments shrunk back to the Division. They were buried with dispersed people, members of the Volkssturm, Hitler Youth members and convalescents.

At the end of the war, the division finally capitulated in the Stutthof-Steegen area.

== Organization ==
pre-1939

- Infanterie-Regiment 19
- Infanterie-Regiment 61
- Infanterie-Regiment 62
- Artillerie-Regiment 7
- I./Artillerie-Regiment 43
- Beobachtung-Abteilung 7
- Panzer-Abwehr-Abteilung 7
- Pionier-Bataillon 7
- Nachrichten-Abteilung 7

1939

- Infanterie-Regiment 19
- Infanterie-Regiment 61
- Infanterie-Regiment 62
- Artillerie-Regiment 7
- I./Artillery-Regiment 43
- Aufklärungs-Abteilung 7
- Panzerjäger-Abteilung 7
- Pionier-Bataillon 7
- Nachrichten-Abteilung 7

1942

- Grenadier-Regiment 19
- Grenadier-Regiment 61
- Grenadier-Regiment 62
- Füsilier-Bataillon 7
- Artillerie-Regiment 7
- I./Artillerie-Regiment 43
- Panzerjäger-Abteilung 7
- Pionier-Bataillon 7
- Nachrichten-Abteilung 7

== Insignia ==
The divisional insignia of the 7th Infantry Division showed a solid blue rectangle.

== Commanders ==
- Franz Halder 1 October 1934 – 12 November 1936
- Otto Hartmann 12 November 1936 – 31 July 1939
- Eugen Ott 1 August 1939 – 30 September 1939
- Eberhardt Bohnstedt 30 September 1939 – 1 December 1939
- Eccard Freiherr von Gablenz 1 December 1939 – 13 December 1941
- Hans Jordan 13 December 1941 – 1 November 1942
- Fritz-Georg von Rappard 1 November 1942 – 2 October 1943
- Carl Andre 2 October 1943 – 30 November 1943
- Gustav Gihr 30 November 1943 – 8 December 1943
- Fritz-Georg von Rappard 8 December 1943
- Alois Weber August 1944 – May 1945

== Sources ==
=== Literature ===
- Burkhard Müller-Hillebrand: Das Heer 1933–1945. Entwicklung des organisatorischen Aufbaues. Vol.III: Der Zweifrontenkrieg. Das Heer vom Beginn des Feldzuges gegen die Sowjetunion bis zum Kriegsende. Mittler: Frankfurt am Main 1969, p. 285.
- Georg Tessin: Verbände und Truppen der deutschen Wehrmacht und Waffen-SS im Zweiten Weltkrieg, 1939 – 1945. Vol. III: Die Landstreitkräfte 6 -14. Mittler: Frankfurt am Main 1967.
