= Franz Ehrlich =

German architect, calligrapher and graphic designer

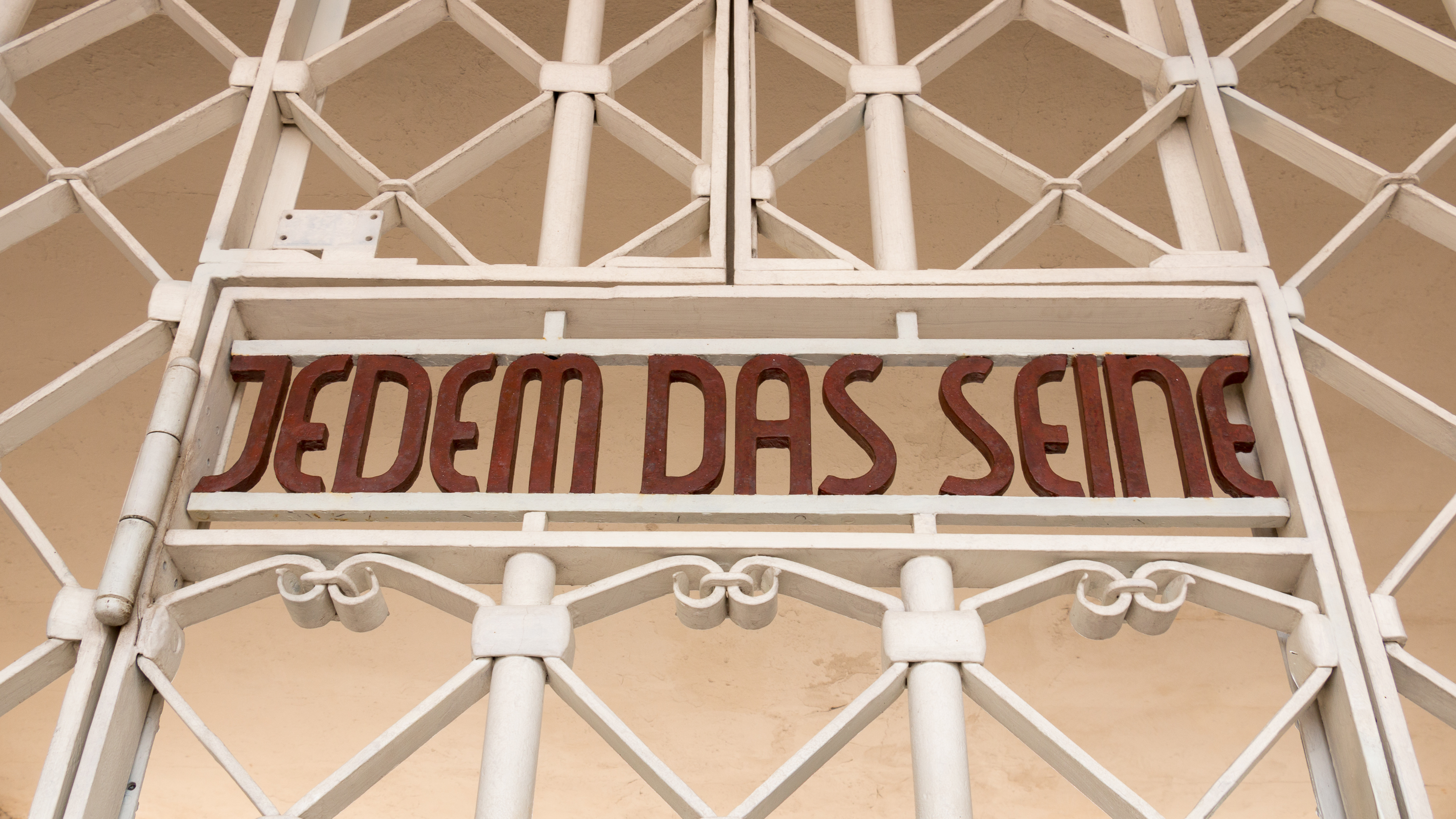
The entrance gate of Buchenwald concentration camp designed by Ehrlich, including the motto Jedem das Seine ("To each his own")

Franz Ehrlich (28 December 1907, Reudnitz near Leipzig – 28 November 1984, Bernburg) was a German architect, calligrapher and graphic designer. He was a student at the Bauhaus in Dessau from 1927 to 1930. Ehrlich was a Communist and was arrested and imprisoned by the Nazi regime in 1935.

== Life ==
After completing elementary schooling at Täubchenweg in Leipzig, Ehrlich began a metal working apprenticeship where he became a part of the German Metal Workers' Union Metallarbeitergewerkschaft (DMV) and the Sozialistischen Arbeiter-Jugend (SAJ). In 1923, he visited the Bauhaus exhibition of New Objectivity architecture which sparked his interest in the movement. After completing his apprenticeship and other schooling he studied at the Bauhaus Dessau from 1927 to 1930.

In 1930, Ehrlich left the Bauhaus and followed Walter Gropius to work as a freelance designer in Berlin and later in Leipzig. After the takeover of power by National Socialism in 1933, Franz Ehrlich joined the anti-fascist resistance and took part in the production of illegal magazines and leaflets for the Young Communist League known as the Kommunistische Jugendverband Deutschlands (KJVD).

Initially imprisoned in the Waldheim penitentiary, he spent most of his sentence in the Zwickau penitentiary. In August 1937 he was released from prison and taken into protective custody. He was taken to Buchenwald concentration camp where, because he was an architect, he was tasked to design the entrance gates for the camp, including the motto Jedem das Seine (German: "to each his own" or "to each what he deserves"). Ehrlich subsequently became the paid main designer for the camp's construction office, designing furnishings for the commandant's house among other jobs. Later a fellow prisoner claimed Ehrlich had helped the resistance by passing construction details to them.

After World War II had concluded, Ehrlich worked on reconstruction in Dresden. During the 1960s he was employed as chief architect for the Leipzig Trade Fair. He designed a "Messeturm" (English: Trade Fair Tower) for it, but this was never built. From 1954 to 1975, he served the Stasi as an informer.

== Legacy ==
Ehrlich became an important architect in the GDR. He bequeathed the Bauhaus Dessau Foundation a collection of approximately 7000 items, including life drawings, art works, furniture, plans, studies, photographs and publications. The collection is of considerable significance as it sheds light on the work of former Bauhaus students between 1933 and 1945 and on those who subsequently worked in the GDR.
