= Wilhelm Bohnstedt =

German general (1888–1947)

- Born: 5 October 1888; Schmarsow, German Empire
- Died: 11 August 1947 (aged 58); Hamelin, Allied-occupied Germany
- Military career
- Allegiance: German Empire; Weimar Republic; Nazi Germany
- Branch: Army
- Service years: 1909–1945
- Rank: Generalleutnant
- Commands: 32nd Infantry Division
- Conflicts: World War I World War II
- Awards: Knight's Cross of the Iron Cross

Wilhelm Bohnstedt (5 October 1888 – 11 August 1947) was a German general in the Wehrmacht during World War II who commanded the 32nd Infantry Division. He was a recipient of the Knight's Cross of the Iron Cross of Nazi Germany. Bohnstedt surrendered in 1945 and was interned until his death in 1947. He was the younger brother of Eberhardt Bohnstedt.

== Awards and decorations ==
- Knight's Cross of the Iron Cross on 13 October 1941 as Generalmajor and commander of 32. Infanterie-Division

Military offices
Preceded by Generalleutnant Franz Böhme	Commander of 32. Infanterie-Division; 15 June 1940 – 1 March 1942	Succeeded by Generalleutnant Karl Hernekamp
