= Feldgendarmerie =

German military police

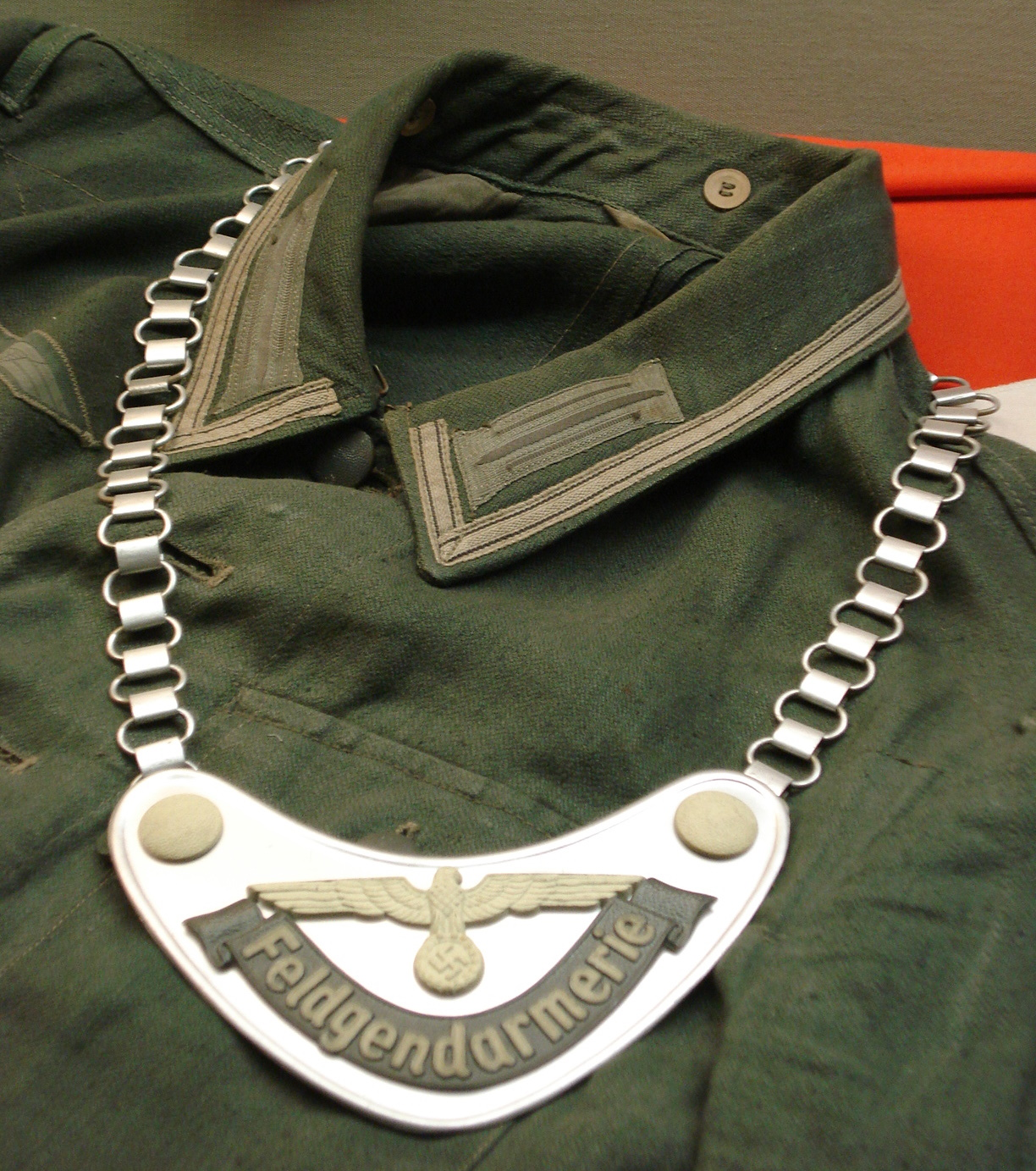
- Uniform of a Feldgendarm during World War II, including the distinctive gorget
- Active: 1810–1812; 1866–1918; 1933–1945
- Disbanded: Nominally 8 May 1945; Completely 1946
- Country: Kingdom of Saxony; German Empire; Nazi Germany
- Branch: Heer; Luftwaffe
- Type: Military Police
- Nickname: Kettenhunde (English: Chain-dogs)

Insignia
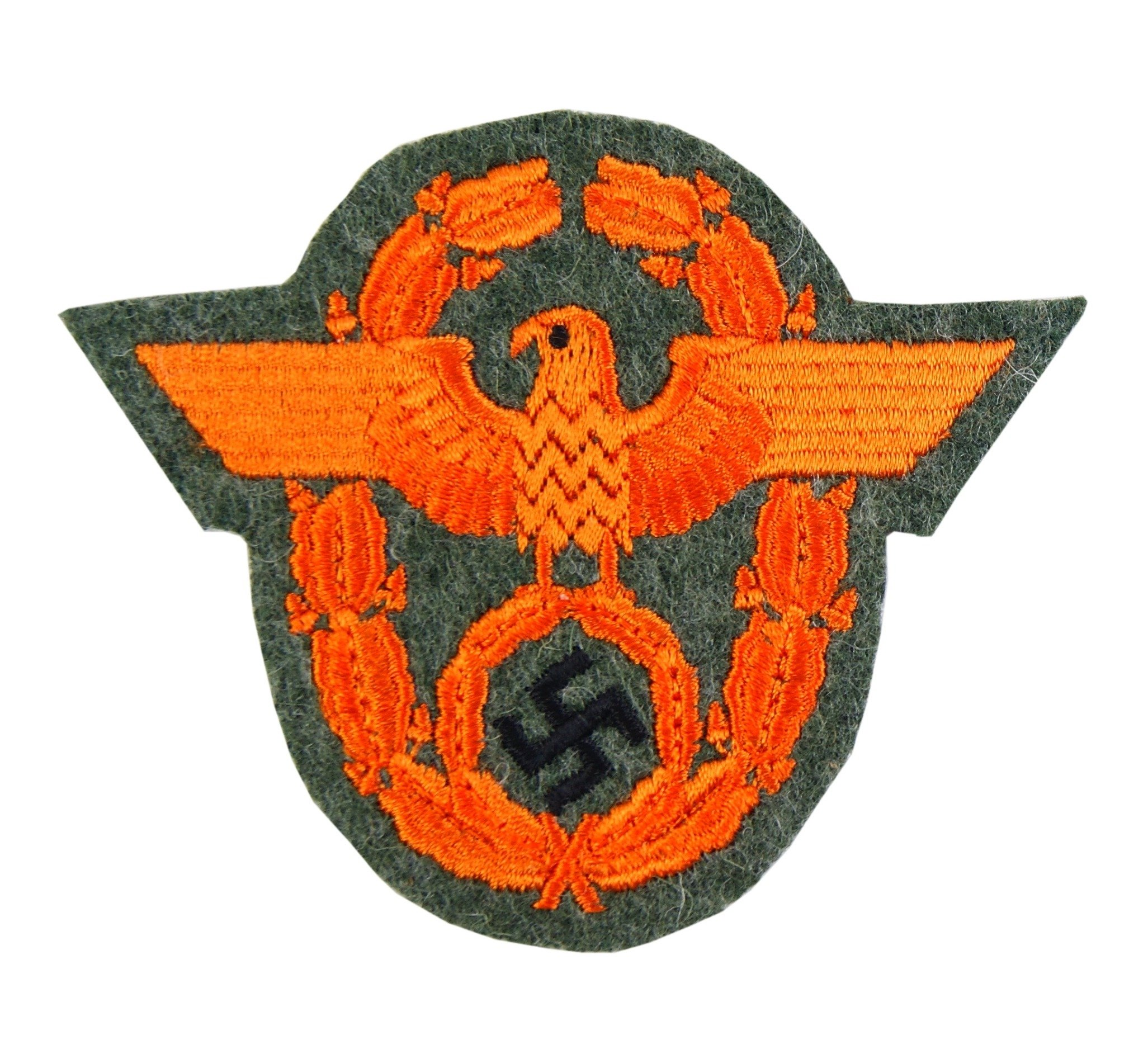
- Regimental Patch

- Command pennant for a Feldgendarmerie company during World War II.

The term Feldgendarmerie (German: [ˈfɛlt.ʒãdaʁməˌʁiː]; transl. "field gendarmerie") refers to military police units of the armies of the Kingdom of Saxony (from 1810), the German Empire and Nazi Germany up to the end of World War II in Europe.

== Early history (1810–1918) ==
From 1810 to 1812 Saxony, Württemberg, Prussia and Bavaria founded a rural police force based on the model of the Napoleonic French Gendarmerie.

The Prussian Gendarmerie staff (Königlich Preußische Landgendarmerie; Royal Prussian State Gendarmerie) were well-proven infantry and cavalry NCOs who joined it after serving their standard time in the army and also included some COs. Officially they were still military personnel, equipped and paid by the Ministry of War, but in peacetime they were attached to the Ministry of the Interior, serving as normal or as mounted police.

In case of a maneuver, mobilization or war, 50% of the Gendarmerie formed the core of military police in the army, called Feldgendarmerie. Should more manpower be needed, regular infantry and cavalry corporals and some COs were seconded to the Feldgendarmerie under the supervision of the former Gendarmerie NCOs/COs. The uniform of the Feldgendarmerie was identical to the uniform of the Landgendarmerie.

At the outbreak of the First World War, the Feldgendarmerie comprised 33 companies, which each had 60 men and two NCOs. By 1918, the number of companies was expanded to 115 units.

After World War I, all military police units were disbanded; no police units existed in the inter-war Weimar Republic era. Garrisons were patrolled by regular soldiers performing the duties of the military police.

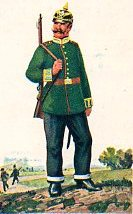
Preußischer Landgendarm der XI. Gendarmerie-Brigade Kassel

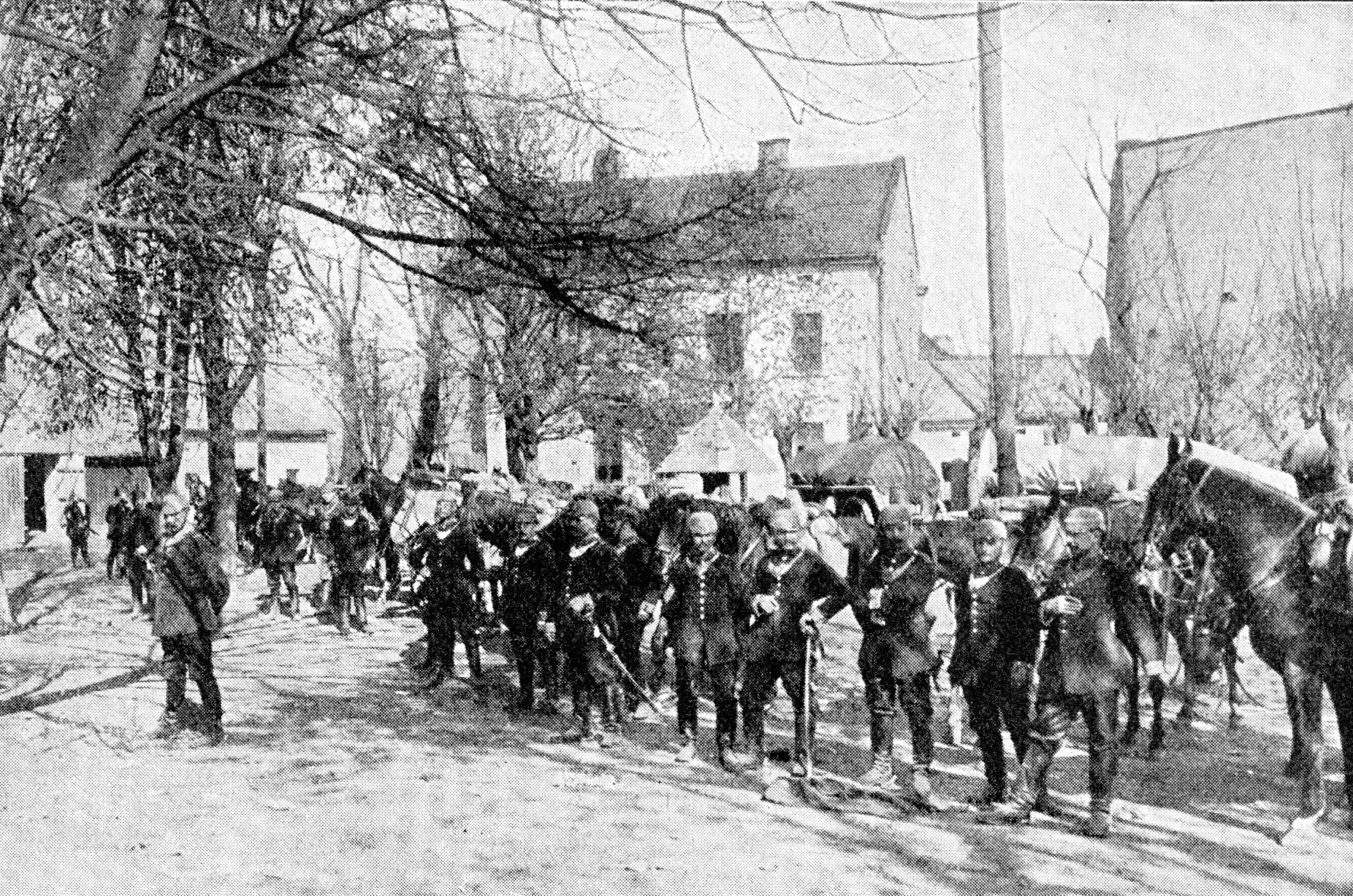
Deutsche Feldgendarmerie in Neu-Sandec Frühjahr 1915

== Nazi Germany (1933–1945) ==
When Adolf Hitler came to power in 1933, Feldgendarmerie were reintroduced into the Wehrmacht. The new units received full infantry training and were given extensive police powers. A military police school was set up in Potsdam near Berlin to train Feldgendarmerie personnel. The subjects covered included apprehending desertions, close-quarters combat in confined space searches, counterinsurgency, counterintelligence, criminal police methodology and general administration, crowd control and riot control, general and special police powers, law enforcement for criminal code, military crime investigation, passport and identification law, providing security in areas at risk of partisans attacks, supporting military operations, self-defence techniques, and tactical weapons drill.

All prospective candidates served at a Feldgendarmerie command after the first term of examinations. Courses lasted one year and failure rates were high: in 1935 only 89 soldiers graduated from an initial intake of 219 candidates. Feldgendarmerie were employed within army divisions and as self-contained units under the command of an army corps. They often worked in close cooperation with the Geheime Feldpolizei (English: Secret Field Police), district commanders and SS and Police Leaders.

== World War II (1939–1945) ==
=== Operations ===
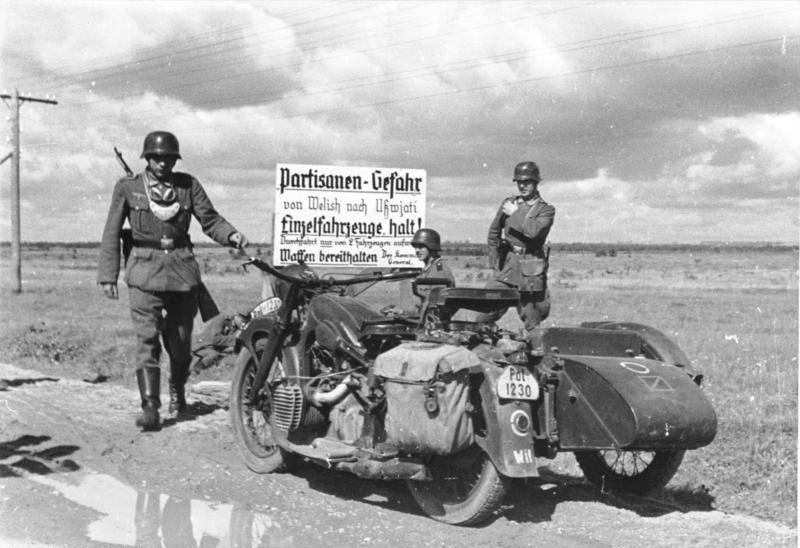
Feldgendarmerie operating in occupied Russia, July 1941. The sign says "Partisanen-Gefahr von Welish nach Ußwjati. Einzelfahrzeuge halt! Waffen bereithalten." / "Partisan danger from Velizh to Usvyaty. Single vehicles Stop! Weapons at the ready."

Feldgendarmerie units were generally given occupation duties in territories directly under the control of the Wehrmacht. Their duties policing the areas behind the front lines ranged from straightforward traffic control and population control to suppression and execution of partisans and the apprehension of enemy stragglers.

When combat units moved forward out of a region, the Feldgendarmerie role would formally end as control was then transferred to occupation authorities under the control of the Nazi Party and SS. Feldgendarmerie units are known to have assisted the SS in committing war crimes in occupied areas. Author Antony Beevor explores some well-documented cases of their participation in his book Stalingrad. Also, Felgendarmerie units took active part in Jew hunting operations, including in Western Europe.

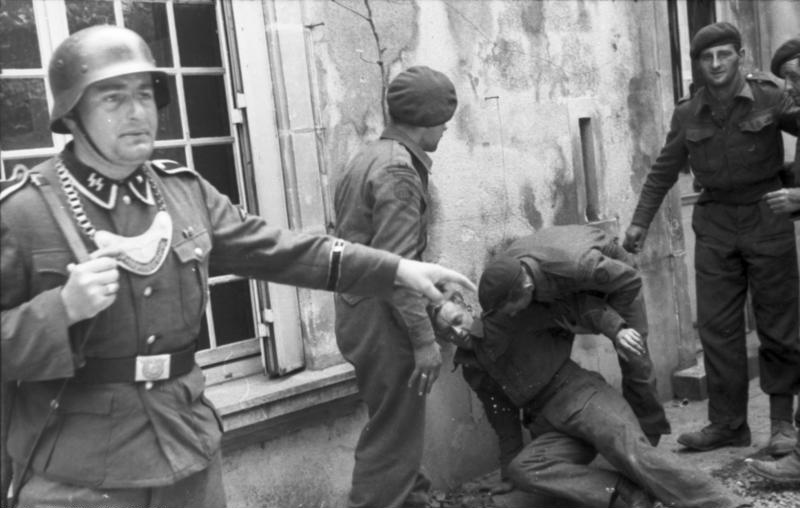
SS-Feldgendarmerie officer with captured British POWs by the 12th SS Panzer Division Hitlerjugend in occupied France, 1944

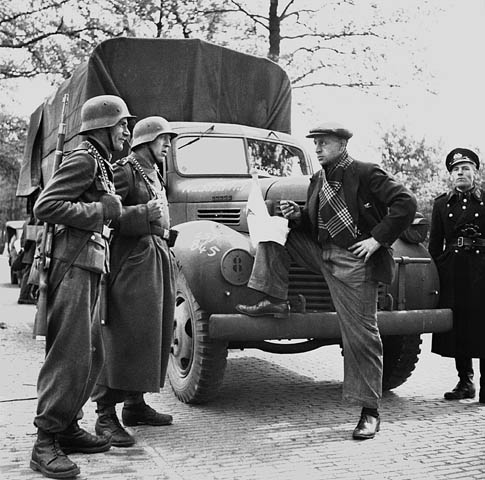
Feldgendarmerie guard a food truck in the Netherlands in 1945.

But by 1943 as the tide of war changed for Nazi Germany, the Feldgendarmerie were given the task of maintaining discipline in the Wehrmacht. Many ordinary soldiers deemed to be deserters were summarily executed by Feldgendarmerie units. This earned them the pejorative Kettenhunde (English: chained dogs) after the gorget they wore with their uniforms. The arbitrary and brutal policing of soldiers gave them the other nickname Heldenklauer (English: hero-snatcher) because they screened refugees and hospital transports for potential deserters with orders to kill suspected malingerers. Rear-echelon personnel would also be checked for passes that permitted them to be away from the front.

The Feldgendarmerie also administered the Strafbataillone (English: Penal Battalions) which were Wehrmacht punishment units created for soldiers convicted by court martial and sentenced to a deferred execution. During the final days of the war, as the Third Reich crumbled, recruits or soldiers who committed even the slightest infraction were sent to a Strafbataillon.

Like many other elements of the German Army, the Feldgendarmerie was involved in the Holocaust. For instance, in August 1942 Feldgendarmerie units rounded up Jews in the Occupied Zone of France as part of a mass deportation operation. The Oxford Handbook of Holocaust Studies stated in 2010 that there is a need for further research into the role of the Feldgendarmerie during the Holocaust.

The SS-Feldgendarmerie wore the same uniform and gorget as their Army counterparts but had an addition cuff title indicating they were military police. Generally they conducted the same policing role, such as controlling rear areas but they also conducted counter-insurgency and extermination operations with Einsatzgruppen against Jews, partisans and those deemed to be "enemies of the Reich". These SS units had a severe reputation for being strict enforcers of military law. They also tracked down and punished those deemed to be deserters. From 1944 onwards, former members of the Ordnungspolizei serving with the Waffen-SS, were also given military police powers and duties. These special SS-Feldgendarmerie were denoted by a diamond polizei-eagle insignia worn on the lower sleeve.

In January 1944 as the Red Army began to advance on the Eastern Front, the power of the Feldgendarmerie was superseded by the creation of the Feldjägerkorps. Answering only to the German High Command (OKW), its three regiments were founded to maintain discipline and military cohesion in all branches of the Wehrmacht (including the Feldgendarmerie). Feldjägers were recruited from decorated, battle-hardened officers and NCOs. They had the military authority of the OKW to arrest and execute officers and soldiers from either the Wehrmacht or the SS for desertion, defeatism and other duty violations. Every unit of the Feldjäger had command of a "Fliegendes Standgericht" (flying drumhead trial/flying court martial), which comprised three judges.

Despite the surrender of all German forces in May 1945, some Feldgendarmerie and Feldjägerkorps units in the western zones of occupied Germany were allowed to keep their weapons by the Allies because of the number of Disarmed Enemy Forces that required guarding and processing. For example, the British VIII Corps based in Schleswig-Holstein used an entire regiment of volunteers from the Feldgendarmerie to maintain discipline at its demobilisation center at Meldorf. Re-activated military police, who received extra rations as pay, were identified by an armband stating Wehrmachtordnungstruppe (Armed Forces Order Troop). In June 1946, more than 12 months after the official end of World War II, the Feldgendarmerie became the last German units to surrender their arms.

=== Organization ===
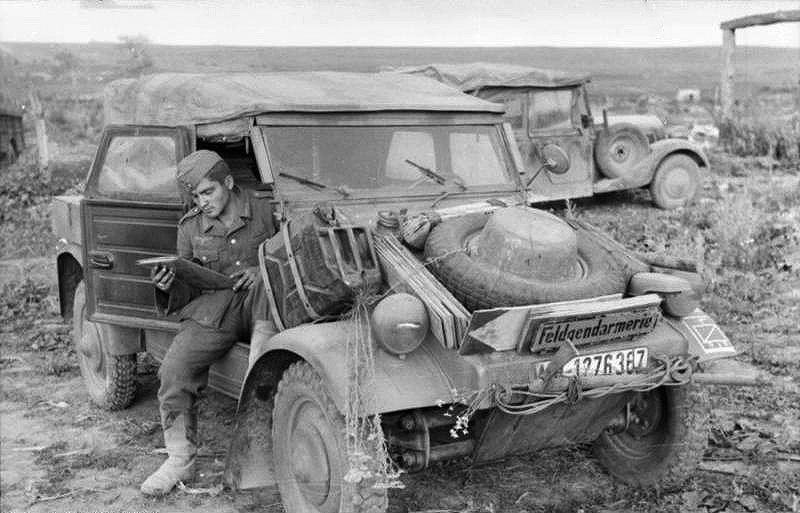
A Feldgendarmerie Kübelwagen on the Eastern Front in June 1943.

The Feldgendarmerie was under the direct control of the German High Command O.K.H. (Oberkommando des Heeres). A Feldgendarmerie major general who was in charge of all Feldgendarmerie personnel attached to the Wehrmacht, was directly subordinated to the Generalquartiermeister. He was responsible for postings and personnel administration, monitoring the performance of the police units, allocation of tasks, traffic regulations and training. His immediate subordinate was a staff officer attached to each Oberkommando Army who commanded the one or more Feldgendarmerie battalions attached to each Wehrmacht formation. The staff officer was responsible for maintaining order and discipline, traffic control during large scale troop movements and maintaining transport routes. Each Feldgendarmerie battalion also had support personnel such as cooks, clerks, and armourers.

A battalion was subdivided into smaller-sized Truppen which were attached to each division or corps. A Gruppe, a section sized unit, were then assigned to specific field or local commands. Feldgendarmerie sections would also be temporarily assigned to special operations, such as anti-partisan duties. A typical Truppe attached to an Infantry or Panzer Division would have up to three officers, 41 NCOs and 20 enlisted men. They would operate in Kübelwagen, trucks and motorcycles (with sidecars).

=== Equipment ===
These battalions were equipped with motorcycles and sidecars, Kübelwagen, field cars such as the Horch 4x4 and 3 ton Opel Blitz lorries and a small number of armoured vehicles as a means of transport.

=== Weapons ===
Personal weapons consisted of small arms such as the Walther PP which was designed as a civilian police pistol (PP Polizei-Pistole) or the Walther PPK, both of which were favoured by officers, whereas the Luger P08 and Walther P38 were used by other ranks. Machine pistols were carried by NCOs and the Mauser Karabiner 98k, the MP40 was issued but was not widely used. The MG34 and MG42 were used as vehicle mounted armament for defending road blocks or vehicle security checkpoints.

== Other military police troops ==
Because the Feldgendarmerie did not have enough manpower to fulfill all of their tasks, the Wehrmacht established several military police–like troops, some of them with limited authority.

- Heeres-/Wehrmachtstreifendienst (Army's Patrol Service)

== Postwar reorganization ==
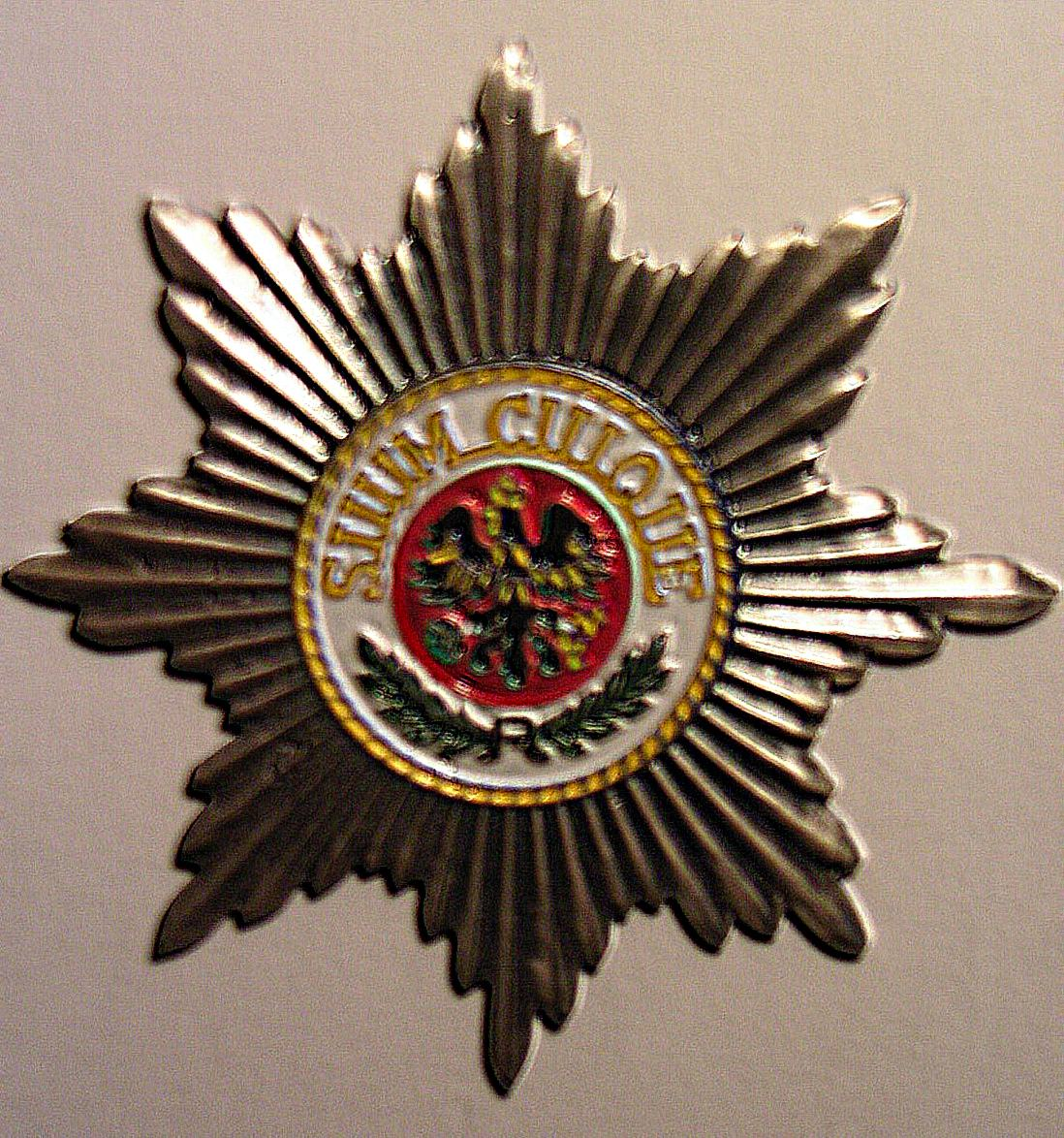
The traditional symbol of the Feldjägers is the Prussian Gardestern Schwarzen Adlerordens (The order of the black eagle) created by Frederick I of Prussia.

With the creation of the Bundeswehr in 1955, many of its branches of service were given names that would at least nominally distinguish them from their logical Wehrmacht equivalents. Thus, military police in the modern Bundeswehr were not called Feldgendarmerie. In fact, the original intent was to call the MPs Militärpolizei, literally military police. However, state officials protested as the law enforcement function in the brand new German constitution had been given primarily to the states, not the federation. The word Polizei (Police) was jealously guarded by the states, so the Federal Defence Ministry searched for a new designation and adopted Feldjäger which was a traditional Prussian regiment with some military police type functions.

== See also ==
- Feldjägerkorps
- Geheime Feldpolizei
- Wehrmachtstreifendienst
