= XXX Army Corps (Wehrmacht) =

XXX. Armeekorps
- Active: 26 August 1939 – 8 May 1945
- Country: Nazi Germany
- Branch: Army
- Size: Corps
- Engagements: World War II: Battle of France; Battle of Greece; Battle of the Metaxas Line; Operation Barbarossa; Battle of the Sea of Azov; Battle of the Kerch Peninsula; Battle of Rostov (1941); Siege of Sevastopol (1941–1942); Sinyavino Offensive (1942); Third Battle of Kharkov; Izyum-Barvenkovo Offensive; Battle of the Dnieper; Nikopol–Krivoi Rog Offensive; Dnieper–Carpathian Offensive; Odessa Offensive; Jassy–Kishinev Offensive

Commanders
- Notable commanders: Hans von Salmuth; Maximilian Fretter-Pico

German XXX. Corps (XXX. Armeekorps) was a corps in the German Army during World War II.

In 1939/40, the corps carried out border surveillance at the German West Border and then took part in the Battle of France and the Balkan campaign. From June 1941, it fought on the Eastern Front for three years, first in the south, then north and center to move south again after the Battle of Stalingrad. In 1944, the Corps retreated to Romania, where it was destroyed during the Jassy–Kishinev Offensive in August 1944. A second deployment followed as the 30th Army Corps z.bV. in the Netherlands in 1944/45.

== Commanders ==
- General der Artillerie Otto Hartmann, 26 August 1939 - 25 March 1941
- Generalleutnant Eugen Ott, 25 March 1941 - 10 May 1941
- General der Infanterie Hans von Salmuth, 10 May 1941 – 27 December 1941
- General der Artillerie Maximilian Fretter-Pico, 27 December 1941 – 4 July 1944
- General der Kavallerie Philipp Kleffel, 4 July 1944 - 16 July 1944
- Generalleutnant Georg-Wilhelm Postel, 16 July 1944 - 31 August 1944. (POW - Corps destroyed)

Second formation:

- Generalleutnant Erich Heinemann 26 October 1944 - 15 November 1944
- Generalleutnant Joachim von Tresckow 15 November 1944 - 23 November 1944
- Generalleutnant Friedrich-Wilhelm Neumann 23 November 1944 - 16 December 1944
- General der Kavallerie Philipp Kleffel, 16 December 1944 - 25 April 1945
- Generalleutnant Arnold Burmeister 25 April 1945 - 8 May 1945

== Area of operations ==
- Germany : September 1939 – May 1940
- France : May 1940 – July 1940
- Poland : July 1940 - January 1941
- Balkans : January 1941 - June 1941
- Eastern Front, southern sector – June 1941 – August 1944 (Corps destroyed)
- Netherlands and North-western Germany : November 1944 - May 1945

== See also ==
- List of German corps in World War II

== Bibliography ==
- Tessin, Georg. Verbände und Truppen der deutschen Wehrmacht und Waffen–SS im Zweiten Weltkrieg 1939–1945 [Units and Troops of the German Military and Waffen-SS in the Second World War 1939–1945] (in German). Vol. 4: Die Landstreitkräfte 15–30 (Ground Units 15–30). Osnabrück: Biblio.
