= 242nd Infantry Division (German Empire) =

242nd Infantry Division (242. Infanterie-Division)
- Active: 1917–19
- Country: Württemberg, German Empire
- Branch: Army
- Type: Infantry
- Size: Approx. 15,000
- Engagements: World War I: Second Battle of the Aisne; German spring offensive; Hundred Days Offensive

The 242nd Infantry Division (242. Infanterie-Division) was a division of the Imperial German Army during World War I. The division was formed on January 16, 1917, and was part of the last large wave of new divisions created during World War I. The division was assembled over the next two months from elements from other units. Its core was the 9. Württembergisches Infanterie-Regiment Nr. 127, a regular infantry regiment from the Kingdom of Württemberg, as well as a brigade headquarters from a regular Württemberg infantry division. To this were added two newly raised Württemberg infantry regiments, along with cavalry, artillery, engineers and support units. The division was considered a Württemberg infantry division and received its initial troops and replacements from that kingdom.

The division entered the trenchline in a quiet sector of Lorraine in March 1917, and after a period of orientation, was sent to fight in the Second Battle of the Aisne, also called the Third Battle of Champagne. It spent the rest of 1917 and the first part of 1918 in positional warfare near Reims and in a defensive fight near Verdun. In 1918, the division participated in the German spring offensive, in the region of Montdidier-Noyon. The division was on the defensive thereafter, including during the Allied Hundred Days Offensive. The division was demobilized in 1919. In 1917, Allied intelligence rated the division a good division with high morale, but by 1918 it was rated a third class division.

The organization of the division on May 2, 1918, was as follows:

- 242. Infanterie-Brigade:
  - 9. Württembergisches Infanterie-Regiment Nr. 127
  - Württembergisches Infanterie-Regiment Nr. 475
  - Württembergisches Infanterie-Regiment Nr. 476
  - Maschinengewehr-Scharfschützen-Abteilung Nr. 78
- 2.Eskadron/Württembergisches Reserve-Dragoner-Regiment
  - Württembergisches Feldartillerie-Regiment Nr. 281
  - III.Bataillon/Hohenzollernsches Fußartillerie-Regiment Nr. 13
- Württembergisches Bataillon Nr. 242
- Divisions-Nachrichten-Kommandeur 242
