= Scheuern (Gernsbach) =

- Stadtteil of Gernsbach
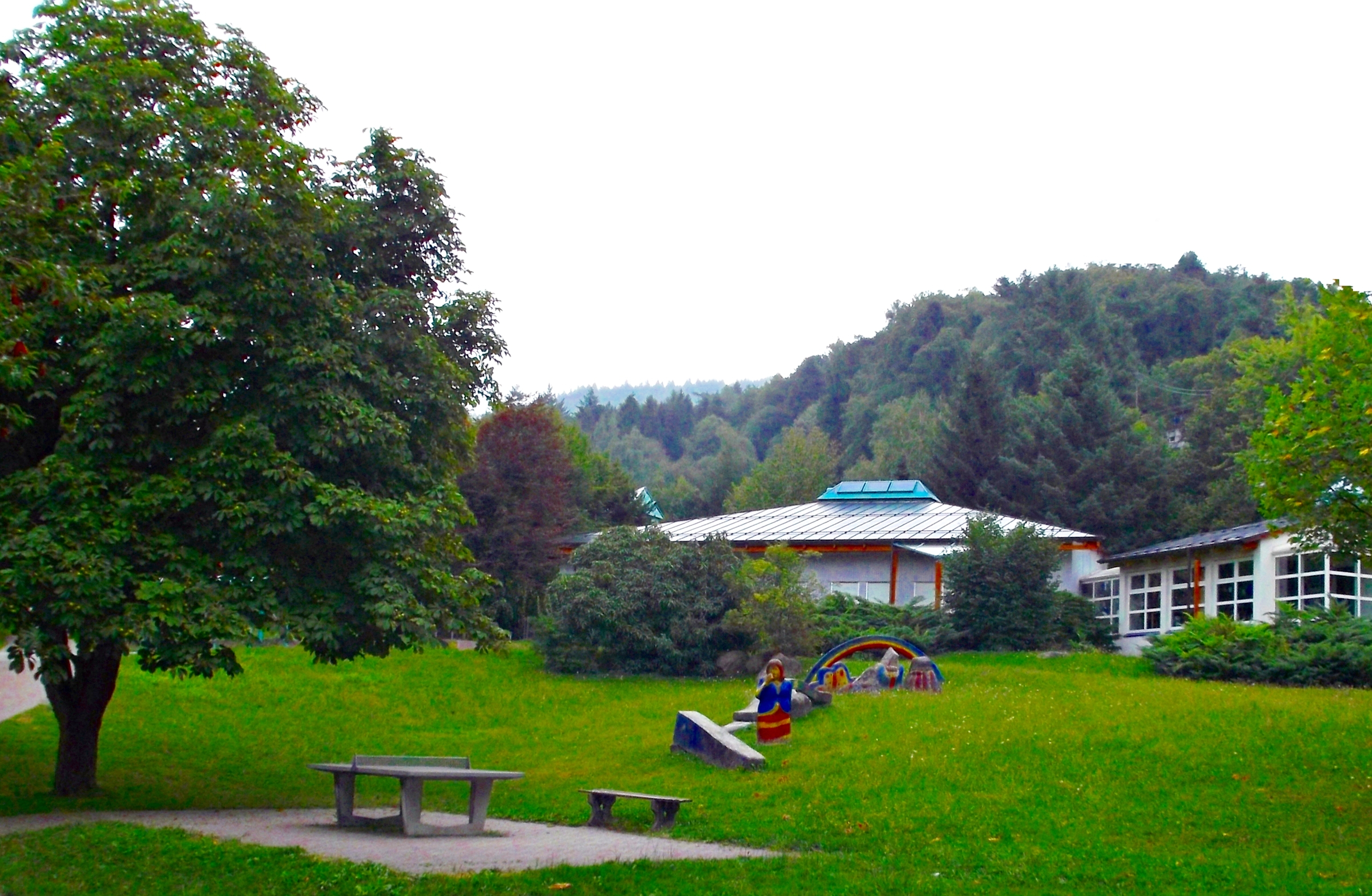
- Kindergarten in Scheuern

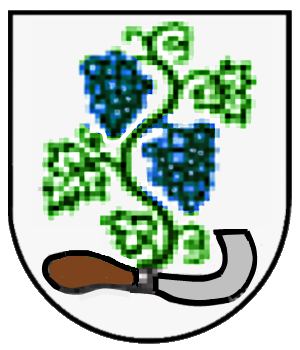
- Coat of arms
- Interactive map of Scheuern
- Location within Germany Location within Baden-Württemberg
- Coordinates: 48°45′20″N 8°20′51″E
- Country: Germany
- State: Baden-Württemberg
- Admin. region: Karlsruhe
- District: Rastatt
- Town: Gernsbach
- Elevation: 215 m (705 ft)

Population
  - Total: 2,000
- Time zone: UTC+01:00 (CET)
  - Summer (DST): UTC+02:00 (CEST)
- Postal codes: 76593
- Dialling codes: 07224

Scheuern (German pronunciation: [ˈʃɔʏɐn]) is a suburb of the town of Gernsbach in the Rastatt district, Baden-Württemberg, Germany.

== Geography ==
The suburb extends south of Gernsbach on the right bank of the Murg River.

== History ==
The first documented mention of Scheuern is as 'zu der Schuren' in the year 1327. Formerly an independent village, Scheuern was incorporated into Gernsbach in 1936.
