= Wehrmachtstreifendienst =

Wehrmachtstreifendienst (Army's Patrol Service) consisted of two elements which were part of the Feldgendarmerie assigned to security duty in railway stations throughout Germany and German-occupied territories during World War II. Their purpose was to maintain order and discipline in stations, ensuring swift movement of troops and hardware, advise and direct soldiers moving through these stations, and to check travel papers, looking for deserters as well as escaped prisoners of war. They were a crucial part of the German military in a period where trains were the fastest way of transporting men and military hardware, and when train stations were a major target of Allied attacks.

The Bahnhofswache were responsible for patrolling all large rail stations, depots and interchanges. Their duties included checking Kennkarte, identification and leave passes of soldiers, checking for deserters, screening civilian passengers, and helping the stations to run efficiently. The Zugwache were similar in most ways to the Bahnhofswache however they acted as police on-board the trains and were usually present only in the major train stations. They had the more dangerous duties of guarding trains traveling through enemy territory and dealing with acts of sabotage by Partisans or Resistance. They were also assigned to guard High Command Staff using the train system. The Bahnhofswache wore no distinguishing corps badge or colour other than their normal military police however an armband or more commonly a gorget were worn with 'Bahnhofswache' imprinted on them and two numbers, one indicating the military district and the other indicating the unit number. Zugwache troops wore a similar gorget but with the monogram WB (Wach Bataillon) and 'Zugwache' imprinted on it.
