= Hans-Karl von Scheele =

German Army general (1892-1955)

- Born: 23 May 1892; Magdeburg, German Empire
- Died: 8 October 1955 (aged 63); Bad Homburg vor der Höhe, West Germany
- Military career
- Allegiance: German Empire; Weimar Republic; Nazi Germany
- Branch: Army
- Service years: 1911–1945
- Rank: General der Infanterie
- Commands: 208th Infantry Division; LII Army Corps
- Conflicts: World War I World War II
- Awards: Knight's Cross of the Iron Cross with Oak Leaves

Hans-Karl von Scheele (23 May 1892 – 8 October 1955) was a German general in the Wehrmacht during World War II. He was a recipient of the Knight's Cross of the Iron Cross with Oak Leaves of Nazi Germany.

== Awards ==
- Iron Cross (1914) 2nd Class (15 September 1914) & 1st Class (15 December 1914)
- Clasp to the Iron Cross (1939) 2nd Class (23 September 1939) & 1st Class (16 May 1940)
- Knight's Cross of the Iron Cross with Oak Leaves
  - Knight's Cross on 4 July 1940 as Oberst and commander of Infanterie-Regiment 191
  - 217th Oak Leaves on 2 April 1943 as Generalleutnant and commander of Korps "Scheele"

Military offices
Preceded by Generalleutnant Moritz Andreas	Commander of 208. Infanterie-Division; 13 December 1941 - 1 February 1943	Succeeded by Generalleutnant Karl-Wilhelm von Schlieben
Preceded by General der Infanterie Eugen Ott	Commander of LII. Armeekorps; 1 October 1943 - 20 November 1943	Succeeded by General der Infanterie Erich Buschenhagen
