= 2nd Cavalry Division (Reichswehr) =

- 2. Kavallerie-Division
- Active: 1921–1934
- Disbanded: October 1934
- Country: Weimar Republic
- Branch: Reichsheer
- Type: Cavalry
- Size: Division
- Part of: Gruppenkommando 1
- Garrison/HQ: Breslau

Commanders
- Notable commanders: Gerd von Rundstedt; Ewald von Kleist

The 2nd Cavalry Division (2. Kavallerie-Division) was a unit of the Reichswehr, the armed forces of Germany during the Weimar Republic.

It consisted of 6 cavalry regiments, the 7th, 8th, 9th, 10th, 11th (Prussian), and 12th (Saxon) Cavalry Regiments. It was subordinated to Gruppenkommando 1.

== Divisional commanders ==
- Generalleutnant Otto von Preinitzer (1 June 1920 - 1 April 1922)
- General der Infanterie Ernst Hasse (1 April 1922 - 1 January 1925)
- General der Kavallerie Hugo von Kayser (1 January 1925 - 1 October 1926)
- Generalleutnant Richard von Graberg (1 October 1926 - 1 October 1928)
- General der Infanterie Gerd von Rundstedt (1 October 1928 - 1 February 1932)
- Generalmajor Paul Ludwig Ewald von Kleist (1 February 1932 - 21 May 1935)

== Garrison ==
The divisional headquarters was in Breslau.
