= Eugen Ott (general) =

German Wehrmacht general

- Born: 20 May 1890; Sinzig, German Empire
- Died: 11 August 1966 (aged 74); Hohenschäftlarn, West Germany
- Military career
- Allegiance: German Empire; Weimar Republic; Nazi Germany
- Branch: German Army
- Service years: 1911–1945
- Rank: General der Infanterie
- Commands: 7th Infantry Division; XXX Army Corps; XI Army Corps; LII Army Corps
- Conflicts: World War I; World War II; Invasion of Poland; Battle of Węgierska Górka; Operation Barbarossa; Battle of the Caucasus; Battle of Kursk; Lower Dnieper Offensive
- Awards: Knight's Cross of the Iron Cross

Eugen Ott (20 May 1890 – 11 August 1966) was a German general in the Wehrmacht during World War II who commanded several corps. He was a recipient of the Knight's Cross of the Iron Cross of Nazi Germany.

== Awards and decorations ==
- Knight's Cross of the Iron Cross on 25 December 1942 as General der Infanterie and commander of LII. Armeekorps

== See also ==
- Jabłonków Incident

Military offices
Preceded by Generalleutnant Otto Hartmann	Commander of 7. Infanterie-Division; 1 August 1939 - 30 September 1939	Succeeded by Generalmajor Eberhardt Bohnstedt
Preceded by General der Artillerie Otto Hartmann	Commander of XXX. Armeekorps; 25 March 1941 - 10 May 1941	Succeeded by Generaloberst Hans von Salmuth
Preceded by General der Infanterie Joachim von Kortzfleisch	Commander of XI. Armeekorps; 6 October 1941 -10 December 1941	Succeeded by General der Infanterie Joachim von Kortzfleisch
Preceded by Generalleutnant Albert Zehler	Commander of LII. Armeekorps; 10 December 1941 - 20 November 1943	Succeeded by General der Infanterie Hans-Karl von Scheele
