= Fritz-Georg von Rappard =

Nazi German general and war criminal

- Born: 15 August 1892; Bramsche, Lower Saxony, German Empire
- Died: 29 January 1946 (aged 53); Velikiye Luki, Russian SFSR, Soviet Union
- Cause of death: Execution by hanging
- Military career
- Allegiance: Nazi Germany
- Branch: Army (Wehrmacht)
- Rank: Generalleutnant
- Commands: 7th Infantry Division
- Conflicts: World War II
- Awards: Knight's Cross of the Iron Cross with Oak Leaves

Fritz-Georg von Rappard (15 August 1892 – 29 January 1946) was a Nazi German general and war criminal during World War II. He commanded the 7th Infantry Division. In 1946, he was part of a group of Wehrmacht personnel tried for war crimes in open court by the Soviet military tribunal in the city of Velikiye Luki. Along with seven other officers of various ranks, Rappard was convicted and executed.

== Awards and decorations ==
- Iron Cross (1914) 2nd Class (11 November 1914) & 1st Class (31 July 1916)
- Iron Cross (1939) 2nd Class (18 June 1940) & 1st Class (24 July 1940)
- German Cross in Gold on 1 June 1944 as Generalleutnant and commander of 7. Infanterie-Division
- Knight's Cross of the Iron Cross with Oak Leaves
  - Knight's Cross on 20 October 1944 as Generalleutnant and commander of 7. Infanterie-Division
  - Oak Leaves on 24 February 1945 as Generalleutnant and commander of 7. Infanterie Division
