= German order of battle for the invasion of Poland =

WW2 German strategy of Poland invasion the beginning of WW2

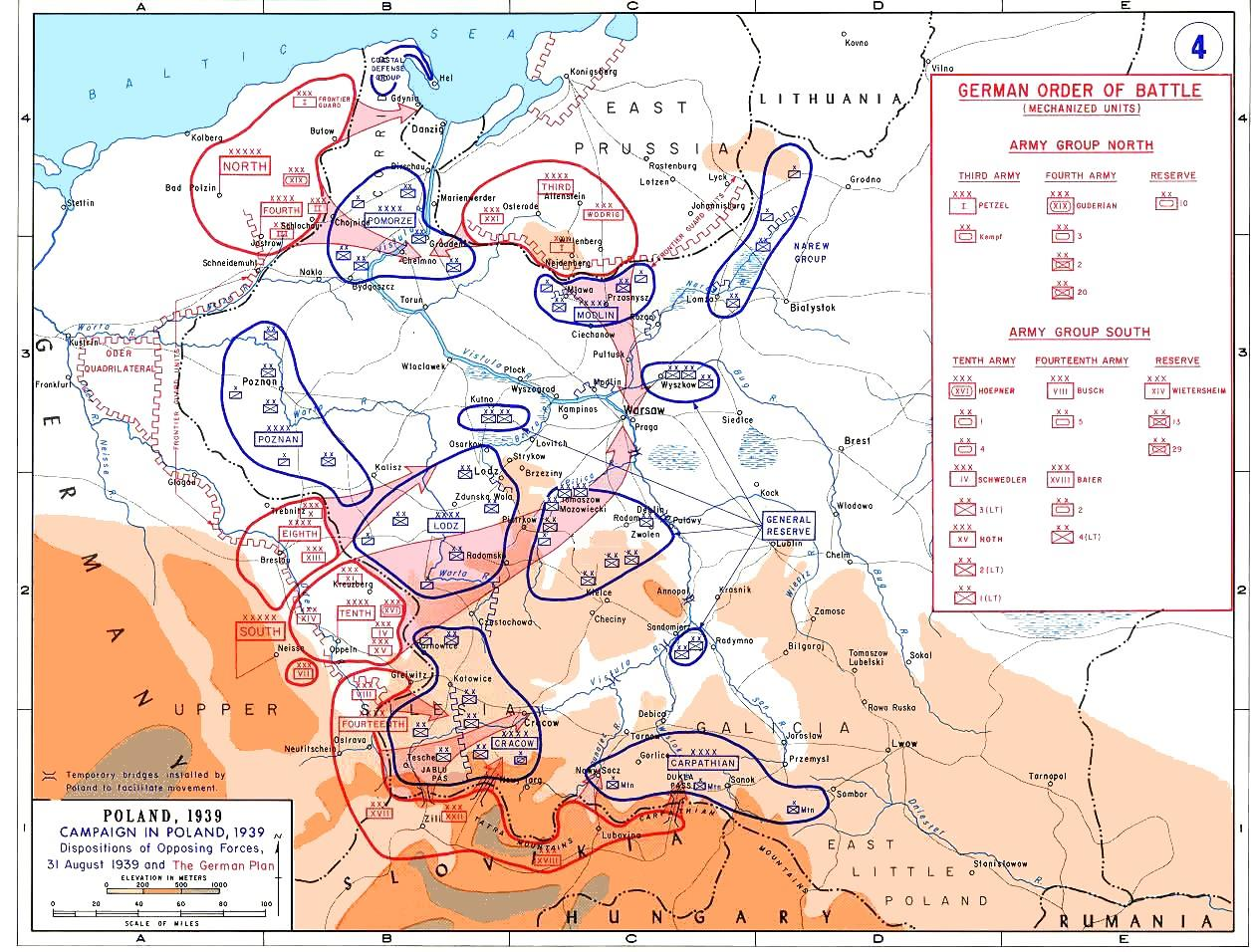
Forces as of 31 August and German plan of attack.

This article details the order of battle of German military units during the invasion of Poland in 1939.

The German army's forces for the invasion of Poland (codename Fall Weiss, English - "Case White") were divided into Army Group North (consisting of the German 3rd and 4th armies) and Army Group South (consisting of the German 8th, 10th, and 14th armies, and the Slovak Army Group Bernolak).

Army Group C was on the western border of Germany defending against a potential French attack. This order of battle is for 04:47 on September 1, after which things started to get shuffled. (Note: e.g. Kampfgeschwader 27 of Luftflotte 2, on the west side of Germany, was transferred to Luftflotte 1, on the east side of Germany, by noon of the first day.)

== Oberkommando des Heeres ==
Oberkommando des Heeres was the High Command of the Heer. It controlled everything related to the Heer: Personnel, Training, Recruitment, Armaments, Transportation, Supplies, Medical Services, etc. An ongoing problem was that each service branch was its own "kingdom" resulting in massive inefficiency.

Oberbefehlshaber des Heeres Generaloberst Walter von Brauchitsch

- Chef des Generalstab des Heeres General der Artillerie Franz Halder

Chief of the General Staff of the Army was the head of all of the departments of the Heer except for the armaments section and the replacement army.

- Chef der Heeresrüstung und Befehlshaber des Ersatzheeres General der Artillerie Friedrich "Fritz" Fromm

Chief of Armaments and Commander of the Replacement Army controlled all army procurement and production, and all of the troops within Germany who were replacements for front line units.

== Heeresgruppe Nord ==
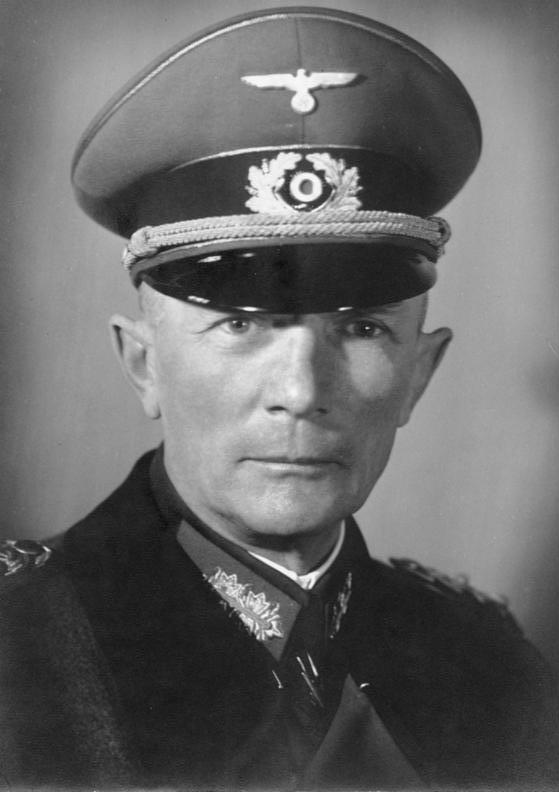
Fedor von Bock

Generaloberst Fedor von Bock (Note: Commanded Heeresgruppe Mitte during Operation Barbarossa)

Heeresgruppe Nord's initial objectives were to capture the "Polish corridor" (4. Armee) and drive southwards towards Warsaw from East Prussia (3. Armee) (Note: On September 1 Heeresgruppe Nord & Heeresgruppe Süd were named 2. Armee & 12. Armee respectively. They were renamed on September 2. They were later renamed Heeresgruppe B & Heeresgruppe A respectively.)

=== Army Group Reserve Troops ===
Directly subordinated to Heeresgruppe Nord

10. Panzer-Division (Note: German High Command Reserve: Their permission was required to utilize these units.) (Generalleutnant Ferdinand Schaal)

Panzer-Regiment 8
Infanterie-Regiment (mot.) (Note: (mot.): motorisiert ("motorized")) 86, II./ (Note: I./, II./, III./, etc is a Battalion/Abteilung of a Regiment. An Abteilung was battalion-sized unit of armor, artillery or cavalry.)
Artillerie-Regiment (mot.) 29
I./ Aufklärungs (Note: Aufklärungs: "reconnaissance")-Regiment 8

73. Infanterie-Division (Generalleutnant Dr.phil.h.c. Friedrich von Rabenau)

Infanterie-Regiment 170, 186, 213
Artillerie-Regiment 173

206. Infanterie-Division (Generalmajor Hugo Höfl)

Infanterie-Regiment 301, 312, 413
Artillerie-Regiment 206

208. Infanterie-Division (Generalmajor Moritz Andreas)

Infanterie-Regiment 309, 337, 338
Artillerie-Regiment 208

=== 3. Armee ===
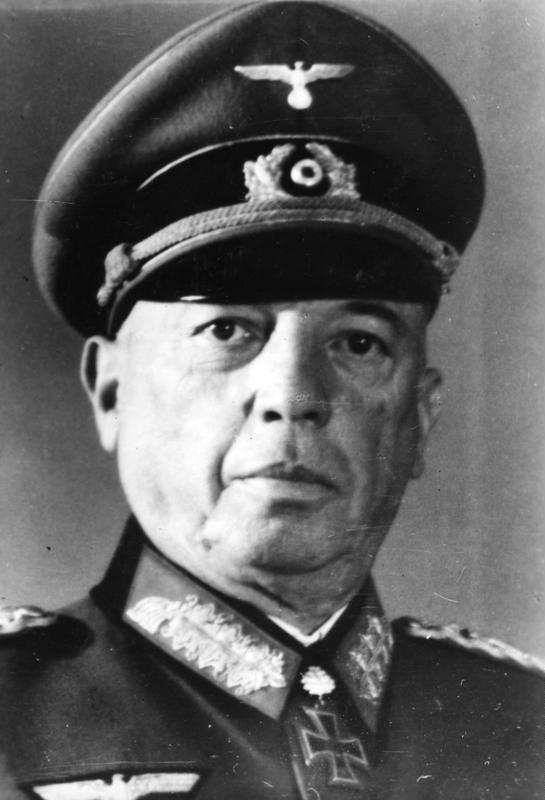
Georg von Küchler

3. Armee was based in East Prussia
General der Artillerie Georg von Küchler

3. Armee Reserves

217. Infanterie-Division (Generalmajor Richard Baltzer)

Infanterie-Regiment 311, 346, 389
Artillerie-Regiment 217

1. Kavallerie-Division (Oberst Kurt Feldt)

Reiter-Regiment (Note: Reiter-Regiment: ("riding" regiment) Calavry Regiment) 1, 2
Radfahr (Note: Radfahr: Bicycle)-Abteilung 1
reitende Artillerie (Note: reitende Artillerie: horse artillery)-Abteilung 1

I. Armeekorps
Generalleutnant Walter Petzel m.F.b. (Note: m.F.b.: mit Führung beauftragt (entrusted with the command) acting (an oversimplification))

11. Infanterie-Division (Generalleutnant Max Bock)

Infanterie-Regiment 2, 23, 44
Artillerie-Regiment 11

61. Infanterie-Division (Char. (Note: Char.: mit Charakter als (with Character of) Acting rank (an over simplification)) Generalleutnant z.V. (Note: z.V.: zur Verfügung (placed at the disposal) reactivated retired officer (an over simplification)) Siegfried Haenicke)

Infanterie-Regiment 151, 162, 176
Artillerie-Regiment 161

Panzerverband Ostpreußen (Note: Panzerverband Ostpreußen: Panzer "Collection" East Prussia (later XXVI. Armeekorps)) (AKA Panzer-Division Kempf) (Generalmajor Werner Kempf)

Panzer-Regiment 7
SS-Standard (mot.) "Deutschland" (Note: Standard: a regiment in SS terminology)
SS-Artillerie-Standart/SS-TV (Note: SS-Totenkopfverbände (Death's Head Units) units of concentration camp guards)

Grenzschutzabschnittskommando (Note: Grenzschutzabschnittskommando: (Border Rifle Section Command) a command area of a group guarding the border) 15 (Generalmajor Wolf Schede)

4 Grenzwacht (Note: Grenzwacht: (Border Watch) Border Patrol)-Regiments

XXI. Armeekorps
Generalleutnant Nikolaus von Falkenhorst

I./ Panzer-Regiment 10 (Oberstleutnant Friedrich-Wilhelm Sieberg)
21. Infanterie-Division (Generalleutnant Kuno-Hans von Both)

Infanterie-Regiment 3, 24, 45
Artillerie-Regiment 21

228. Infanterie-Division (Generalmajor Hans Suttner)

Infanterie-Regiment 325, 356, 400
Artillerie-Regiment 228

Führungsstab z.b.V. (Note: Führungsstab z.b.V.: (Leadership staff); zur besonderen Verwendung (for special purpose) a Headquarters unit created for a specific purpose) 1 (also known as Kommandostab (Note: Kommandostab: (Command Staff) a Headquarters unit) Wodrig, Korps Wodrig)
Generalleutnant Albert Wodrig

1. Infanterie-Division (Generalmajor Joachim von Kortzfleisch)

Infanterie-Regiment 1, 22, 43
Artillerie-Regiment 1

12. Infanterie-Division (Generalleutnant Ludwig von der Leyen)

Infanterie-Regiment 27, 48, 89
Artillerie-Regiment 12

Gruppe Brand
Generalmajor Albrecht Brand

Kommandantur der Befestigungen bei Königsberg Albrecht Brand (Note: Command of the Fortifications near Königsberg) an area command of "fortifications"; mostly a concentration of better armed border guards (an over simplification))

Infanterie-Regiment "Gumbinnen"
Landwehr (Note: Landwehr: (Defence of the Land) a national guard/militia type unit (older than 35 and younger than 45))-Infanterie-Regiment 152
2 Grenzwacht-Regiments

Brigade Goldap (Oberst Hans-Erich Nolte)

IV./ Landwehr-Infanterie-Regiment 161
II./ Landwehr-Infanterie-Regiment 162
II./ Landwehr-Artillerie-Regiment 161

Brigade Lötzen (Generalmajor Otto-Ernst Ottenbacher)

Landwehr-Infanterie-Regiment 161, 162
Landwehr-Artillerie-Regiment 161
1 Grenzwacht-Regiment

=== 4. Armee ===
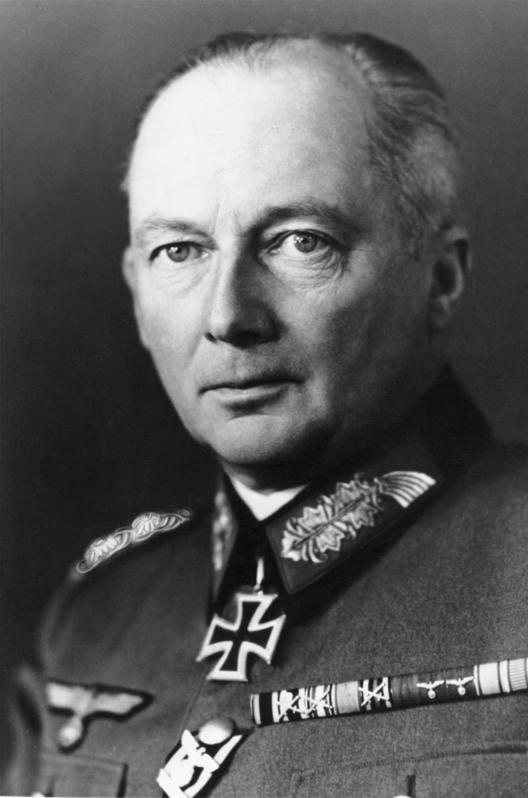
Günther von Kluge

4. Armee was based in Western Pomerania
General der Artillerie Günther von Kluge

4. Armee Reserves

23. Infanterie-Division (Generalleutnant Walter Graf von Brockdorff-Ahlefeldt)

Infanterie-Regiment 9, 67, 68
Artillerie-Regiment 23

218. Infanterie-Division (Generalmajor Woldemar Freiherr Grote)

Infanterie-Regiment 323, 386, 397
Artillerie-Regiment 218

Grenzschutzabschnittskommando 1 (General der Flieger z.V. Leonhard Kaupisch)

2 Grenzwacht-Regiments

207. Infanterie-Division (Generalmajor Karl von Tiedemann)

Infanterie-Regiment 322, 368, 374
Artillerie-Regiment 207

Grenzschutzabschnittskommando 2 (Char. Generalleutnant Friedrich (Fritz) Büchs)

4 Grenzwacht-Regiments

Grenzschutzabschnittskommando 12 (Generalmajor z.V. Hermann Metz)

Grenz-Infanterie (Note: Grenz-Infanterie: (Border Infantry): better armed and trained "border guards")-Regiment "Crossen", "Meseritz", "Schwerin"
3 Grenzwacht-Regiments

II. Armeekorps
General der Infanterie Adolf Strauß

3. Infanterie-Division (Generalmajor Walter Lichel)

Infanterie-Regiment 8, 29, 50
Artillerie-Regiment 3

32. Infanterie-Division (Generalleutnant Franz Böhme)

Infanterie-Regiment 4, 94, 96
Artillerie-Regiment 32

III. Armeekorps
General der Artillerie Curt Haase

50. Infanterie-Division (Generalleutnant Konrad Sorsche)

Grenz-Infanterie-Regiment 121, 122, 123 (Note: Grenz-Infanterie-Regiment 121, 122, 123: redesignated Infanterie-Regiment 121, 122, 123 on 10 November 1939)
schw. (Note: schw.: schwere (heavy)) Artillerie-Abteilung (mot.) 101

Brigade Netze (Generalmajor Eccard Freiherr von Gablenz)

2 Grenzwacht-Regiments

XIX. Armeekorps
General der Panzertruppe Heinz Guderian

3. Panzer-Division (Generalleutnant Leo Freiherr Geyr von Schweppenburg)

3. Panzer-Brigade (Panzer-Regiment 5, 6), Panzer-Lehr (Note: Panzer-Lehr: (Panzer Teaching) a school unit of highly trained instructors)-Abteilung
3. Schützen-Brigade (Schützen-Regiment 3)
Artillerie-Regiment 75 (mot.)

2. Infanterie-Division (mot.) (Generalleutnant Paul Bader)

Infanterie-Regiment 5 (mot.), 25 (mot.), 92 (mot.)
Artillerie-Regiment 2 (mot.)

20. Infanterie-Division (mot.) (Generalleutnant Mauritz von Wiktorin)

Infanterie-Regiment 69 (mot.), 76 (mot.), 80 (mot.)
Artillerie-Regiment 56 (mot.)

== Heeresgruppe Süd ==
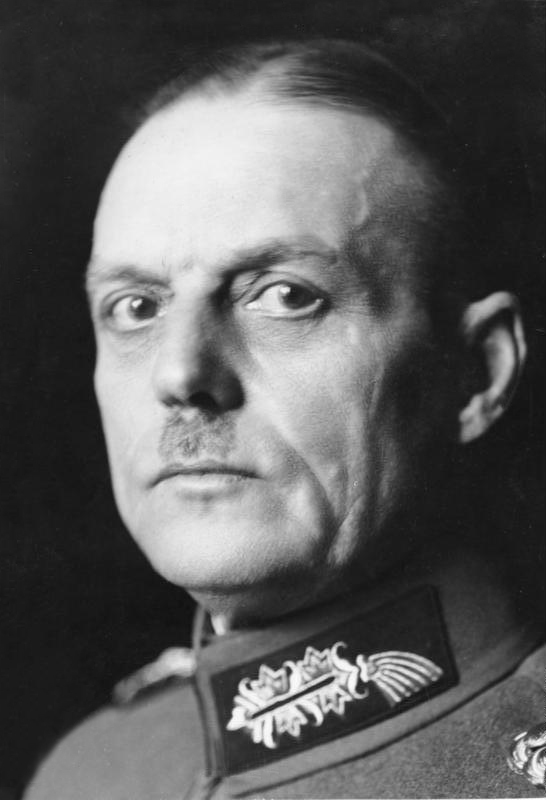
Gerd von Rundstedt

Generaloberst Gerd von Rundstedt (Note: Also commanded Heeresgruppe Süd during Operation Barbarossa)

Heeresgruppe Süd's initial objective was to drive from Silesia towards Warsaw (by 8. Armee and 10. Armee), and to destroy the Polish forces around Kraków (by 14. Armee)

=== Army Group Reserve Troops ===
Directly subordinated to Heeresgruppe Süd

56. Infanterie-Division (Generalmajor Karl Kriebel)

Infanterie-Regiment 92, 171, 234
Artillerie-Regiment 156

57. Infanterie-Division (Generalmajor Oskar Blümm)

Infanterie-Regiment 179, 199, 217
Artillerie-Regiment 157

252. Infanterie-Division (Char. Generallutnant z.V. Diether von Boehm-Bezing)

Infanterie-Regiment 452, 461, 472
Artillerie-Regiment 252

257. Infanterie-Division (Generalleutnant Max von Viebahn)

Infanterie-Regiment 457, 466, 477
Artillerie-Regiment 257

258. Infanterie-Division (Generalmajor Walter Wollmann)

Infanterie-Regiment 458, 478, 479
Artillerie-Regiment 258

VII. Armeekorps (General der Infanterie Eugen Ritter von Schobert)

27. Infanterie-Division (Generalleutnant Friedrich Bergmann)

Infanterie-Regiment 40, 63, 91
Artillerie-Regiment 27

68. Infanterie-Division (Oberst Georg Braun m.F.b.)

Infanterie-Regiment 169, 188, 196
Artillerie-Regiment 168

XXII. Armeekorps (General der Kavallerie z.V. Ewald von Kleist)

62nd Infantry Division (General Walter Keiner)

Infanterie-Regiment 164, 183, 190

213th Infantry Division (General Rene de l'Homme de Courbiere)

Infanterie-Regiment 318, 354, 406

221st Infantry Division (General Johann Pflugbeil)

Infanterie-Regiment 350, 360, 375

Enroute

1. Gebirgs-Division (Note: Gebirgs: "Mountain") (Generalmajor Ludwig Kübler)

Gebirgs-Jäger (Note: Gebirgs-Jäger: "mountain hunter" mountain trained infantry)-Regiment 98, 99, 100
Gebirgs-Artillerie-Regiment 79

2. Gebirgs-Division (Generalleutnant Valentin Feurstein)

Gebirgs-Jäger-Regiment 136, 137
Gebirgs-Artillerie-Regiment 111

=== 8. Armee ===
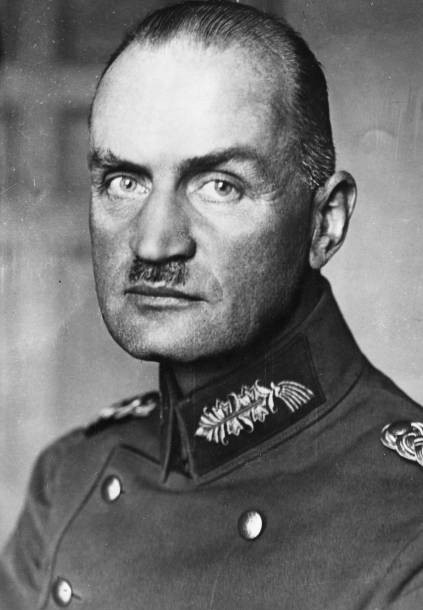
Johannes Blaskowitz

8. Armee was based in northern Silesia
General der Infanterie Johannes Blaskowitz

8. Armee Reserves

30. Infanterie-Division (Generalleutnant Kurt von Briesen)

Infanterie-Regiment 6, 26, 46
Artillerie-Regiment 30

Grenzschutzabschnittskommando 13 (Generalleutnant z.V. Max von Schenckendorff)

2 Grenzwacht-Regiments

Grenzschutzabschnittskommando 14 (Char. General der Kavallerie z.V. Kurt Ludwig Freiherr von Gienanth)

Landwehr-Infanterie-Regiment 183
2 Grenzwacht-Regiments

X. Armeekorps
General der Artillerie z.V. Wilhelm Ulex

24. Infanterie-Division (Generalleutnant Friedrich Olbricht)

Infanterie-Regiment 31, 32, 102
Artillerie-Regiment 24

XIII. Armeekorps
General der Kavallerie Maximilian Reichsfreiherr von und zu Weichs an der Glon

10. Infanterie-Division (Generalleutnant Conrad von Cochenhausen)

Infanterie-Regiment 20, 41, 85
Artillerie-Regiment 10

17. Infanterie-Division (Generalmajor Herbert Loch)

Infanterie-Regiment 21, 55, 95
Artillerie-Regiment 17

SS-Infanterie-Regiment (mot.) „Leibstandarte SS Adolf Hitler" (SS-Oberstgruppenführer Josef "Sepp" Dietrich).

=== 10. Armee ===
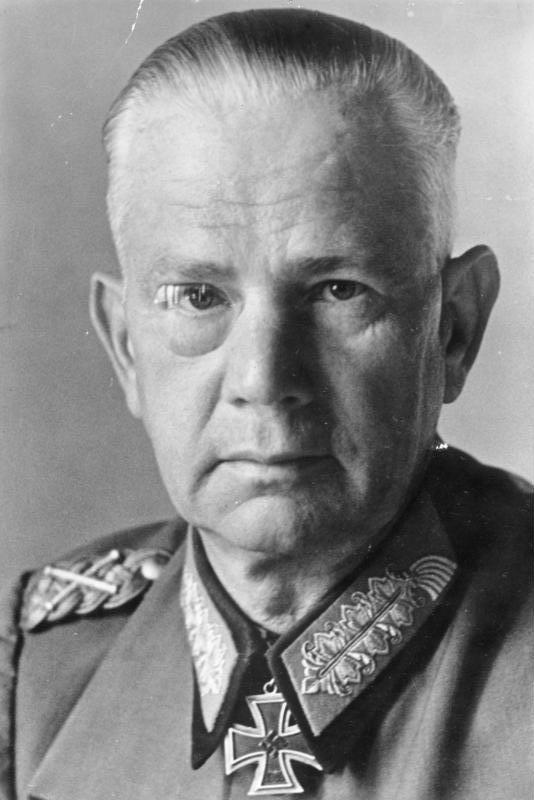
Walter von Reichenau

10. Armee was based in southern Silesia
General der Artillerie Walter von Reichenau

10. Armee Reserves

1. leichte Division (Generalmajor Friedrich-Wilhelm von Loeper)

Panzer-Regiment 11, Panzer-Abteilung 65, 6
Schützen-Brigade (Schützen-Regiment 4)
Artillerie-Regiment 76 (mot.)

IV. Armeekorps
General der Infanterie Viktor von Schwedler

4. Infanterie-Division (Generalleutnant Erik-Oskar Hansen)

Infanterie-Regiment 10, 52, 103
Artillerie-Regiment 4

46. Infanterie-Division (Generalmajor Paul von Hase)

Infanterie-Regiment 42, 72, 97
Artillerie-Regiment 115

XI. Armeekorps
General der Artillerie Emil Leeb

18. Infanterie-Division (Generalmajor Friedrich-Carl Cranz)

Infanterie-Regiment 30, 51, 54
Artillerie-Regiment 18

19. Infanterie-Division (Generalleutnant Günther Schwantes)

Infanterie-Regiment 59, 73, 74
Artillerie-Regiment 19

XIV. Armeekorps (mot.)
General der Infanterie Gustav von Wietersheim

13. Infanterie-Division (mot.) (Generalleutnant Moritz von Faber du Faur m.F.b.)

Infanterie-Regiment 33 (mot.), 66 (mot.), 93 (mot.)
Artillerie-Regiment 13 (mot.)

29th Motorized Division (Generalleutnant Joachim Lemelsen)

Infanterie-Regiment 15 (mot.), 71 (mot.)
Artillerie-Regiment 29 (mot.)

XV. Armeekorps (mot.)
General der Infanterie Hermann Hoth

2. leichte Division (Generalleutnant Georg Stumme)

Panzer-Abteilung 66
Kavallerie-Schützen-Regiment 6, 7
Artillerie-Regiment 78 (mot.)

3. leichte Division (Generalmajor Adolf-Friedrich Kuntzen)

Panzer-Abteilung 67
Kavallerie-Schützen-Regiment 8, 9
Artillerie-Regiment 80 (mot.)

XVI. Armeekorps (mot.)
General der Kavallerie Erich Höpner

1. Panzer-Division (Generalleutnant Rudolf Schmidt)

1. Panzer-Brigade (Panzer-Regiment 1, 2)
1. Schützen-Brigade (Schützen-Regiment 1)
Artillerie-Regiment 73 (mot.)

4. Panzer-Division (Generalmajor Georg-Hans Reinhardt)

5. Panzer-Brigade (Panzer-Regiment 35, 36)
Schützen-Regiment 12
Artillerie-Regiment 103 (mot.)

14. Infanterie-Division (Generalleutnant Peter Weyer)

Infanterie-Regiment 11, 53, 116
Artillerie-Regiment 14

31. Infanterie-Division (Generalleutnant Rudolf Kämpfe)

Infanterie-Regiment 12, 17, 82
Artillerie-Regiment 31

=== 14. Armee ===
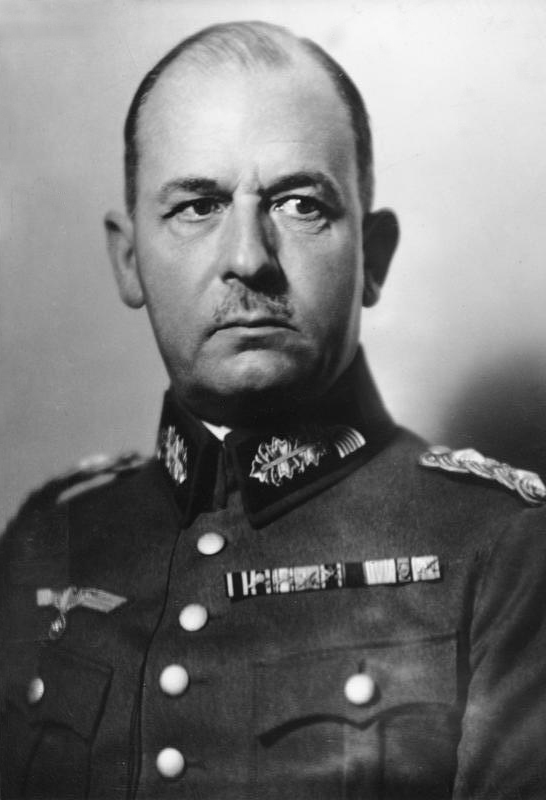
Wilhelm List

14. Armee was based in Moravia and Slovakia
Generaloberst Wilhelm List

14. Armee Reserves

239. Infanterie-Division (Generalmajor Ferdinand Neuling)

Infanterie-Regiment 327, 372, 444
Artillerie-Regiment 239

Grenzschutzabschnittskommando 3 (Generalleutnant z.V. Georg Brandt)

3 Grenzwacht-Regiments

Grenzschutzabschnittskommando 30 (Generalmajor Erwin Engelbrecht)

III./ Infanterie-Regiment 135
III./ Gebirgsjäger-Regiment 100
I./ Gebirgsjäger-Regiment 137

VIII. Armeekorps
General der Infanterie Ernst Busch

5. Panzer-Division (Generalleutnant Heinrich von Vietinghoff genannt Scheel)

8. Panzer-Brigade (Panzer-Regiment 15, 31)
Schützen-Regiment 13 (mot.), 14 (mot.)
Artillerie-Regiment 116 (mot.)

8. Infanterie-Division (Generalleutnant Rudolf Koch-Erpach)

Infanterie-Regiment 28, 38, 84
Artillerie-Regiment 8

28. Infanterie-Division (Generalleutnant Hans von Obstfelder

Consisted of the 7th, 49th, and 83rd Infantry Regiments
Artillerie-Regiment 28

SS-Standart (mot.) "Germania" (SS-Standartenführer Karl-Maria Demelhuber)

XVII. Armeekorps
General der Infanterie Werner Kienitz

7. Infanterie-Division (Generalmajor Eugen Ott)

Infanterie-Regiment 19, 61, 62
Artillerie-Regiment 7

44. Infanterie-Division (Generalleutnant Albrecht Schubert)

Infanterie-Regiment 131, 132, 134
Artillerie-Regiment 96

45. Infanterie-Division (Generalleutnant Friedrich Materna)

Infanterie-Regiment 130, 133, 135
Artillerie-Regiment 98

XVIII. Armeekorps
General der Infanterie Eugen Beyer

2. Panzer-Division (Generalleutnant Rudolf Veiel)

2. Panzer-Brigade (Panzer-Regiment 3, 4)
2. Schützen-Brigade (Schützen-Regiment 2)
Artillerie-Regiment 74 (mot.)

4. leichte Division (Generalmajor Dr.iur. Alfred Ritter von Hubicki)

Panzer-Abteilung 33
Kavallerie-Schützen-Regiment 10, 11
Artillerie-Regiment 102 (mot.)

3. Gebirgs-Division (Generalmajor Eduard Dietl)

Gebirgs-Jäger-Regiment 138, 139
Gebirgs-Artillery-Regiment 112

=== Slovak Army Bernolak ===
Polní armáda "Bernolák" (Field Army Bernolak)
Generál 1. třídy Ferdinand Čatloš

1. Divise "Jánošík" (Generál 2. třídy Antonin Pulanich)

Pěší pluk 1, 4, 6
Dělostřelecký pluk 1.

2. Divise "Škultéty" (Note: In reserve)) (Podplukovník Ján Imro, (09.05.1939 Generál 2. třídy Alexandr Čunderlik))

Pěší pluk 3
Dělostřelecký pluk 2

3. Divise "Rázus" (Plukovník Augustín Malár)

Pěší pluk 2, 21
Dělostřelecký pluk 3, 4

Pěší pluk 5

Undergoing Organization and Training

Infanterie-Regiment Großdeutschland (Note: Infantry Regiment Großdeutschland: included here due to the confusion with SS-Standard "Deutschland". Großdeutschland was in Berlin/Moabit Barracks being upgraded/expanded from Wach-Bataillon Berlin a ceremonial guard unit.) (Oberstleutnant Hunold von Stockhausen).

== Heeresgruppe C ==
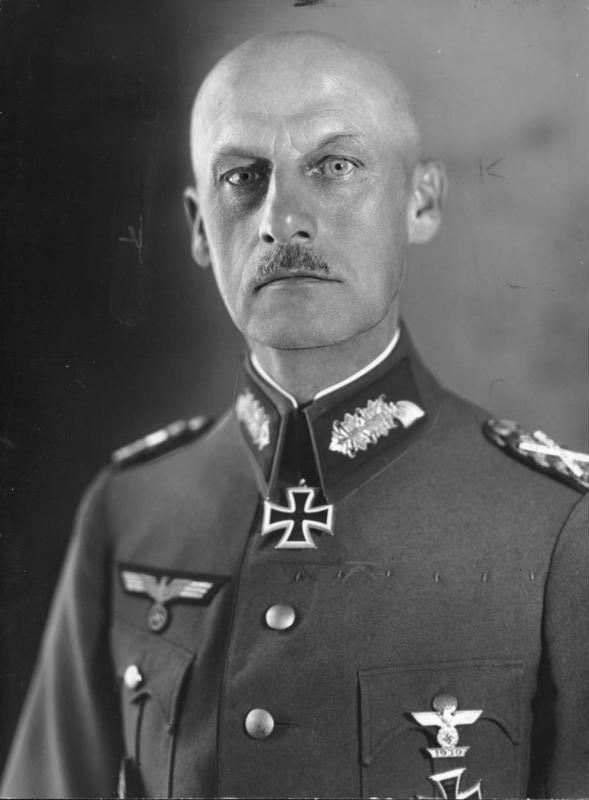
Wilhelm Ritter von Leeb

Char. Generaloberst z.V. Wilhelm Ritter von Leeb (Note: Commanded Heeresgruppe Nord during Operation Barbarossa)

Heeresgruppe C's only duty was to protect the western border of Germany from any French attacks until stronger units could be sent back from the east. It was accomplished by deception. The units were generally under strength, most of the infantry unit were missing their heavy weapons platoons, and some entire battalions. There was almost no mobility, except for horses and bicycles. Some of the units were headquarters only to give the impression of a larger presence.

=== Army Group Reserve Troops ===
Directly subordinated to Heeresgruppe C

76. Infanterie-Division (Generalmajor Maximilian de Angelis)

German High Command Reserve

251. Infanterie-Division (Generalleutnant Hans Kratzert)
253. Infanterie-Division (Generalleutnant z.V. Friedrich "Fritz" Kühne)
254. Infanterie-Division (Char. Generalleutnant z.V. Friedrich "Fritz" Koch)
255. Infanterie-Division (Generalmajor Wilhelm Wetzel)
256. Infanterie-Division (Generalmajor Josef Folttmann)
260. Infanterie-Division (Char. Generalleutnant z.V. Hans Schmidt)
262. Infanterie-Division (Generalmajor Edgar Theisen)
263. Infanterie-Division (Generalmajor Franz Karl)
267. Infanterie-Division (Char. General der Panzertruppe z.V. Ernst Feßmann)
268. Infanterie-Division (Generalmajor Erich Straube)
269. Infanterie-Division (Generalmajor Ernst Eberhard Hell)

=== 5. Armee ===
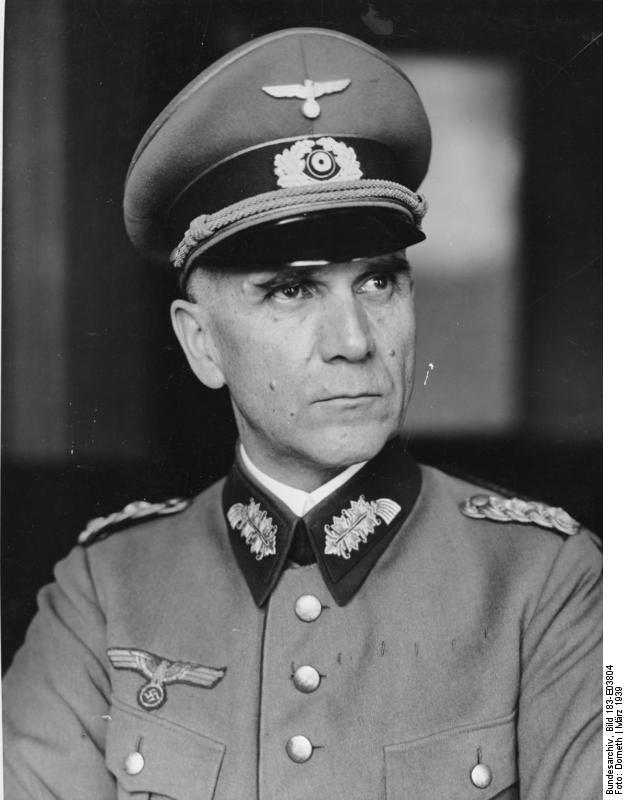
Curt Liebmann

5. Armee was based along the Luxembourg and Belgium border
General der Infanterie z.V. Curt Liebmann

5. Armee Reserves

58. Infanterie-Division (Generalmajor Iwan Heunert)
87. Infanterie-Division (Generalmajor Bogislav von Studnitz)

V. Armeekorps
General der Infanterie Richard Ruoff

22. Infanterie-Division (Generalmajor Hans Graf von Sponeck)
225. Infanterie-Division (Generalleutnant Ernst Schaumburg)

VI. Armeekorps
General der Pioniere Otto-Wilhelm Förster

1 Grenz-Infanterie-Regiment

XXVII. Armeekorps
Char. General der Infanterie z.V. Karl Ritter von Prager

16. Infanterie-Division (Generalleutnant Gotthard Heinrici)
69. Infanterie-Division (Oberst Hermann Tittel)
211. Infanterie-Division (Generalmajor Kurt Renner)
216. Infanterie-Division (Char. Generalleutnant Hermann Boettcher)

XXX. Armeekorps
Generalleutnant Otto Hartmann

Generalkommando der Grenztruppen Eifel (General der Infanterie Erich Raschick) (later XXIII. Armeekorps)

26. Infanterie-Division (Generalleutnant Sigismund von Förster)
86. Infanterie-Division (Generalmajor Joachim Witthöft)
227. Infanterie-Division (Oberst Friedrich Zickwolff m.F.b.)
Grenz-Division Trier (Generalmajor Franz Mattenklott) (later 72. Infanterie-Division {19. September})
Grenzschutzabschnittskommando 9 (Oberst Hans von Sommerfeld)

=== 1. Armee ===
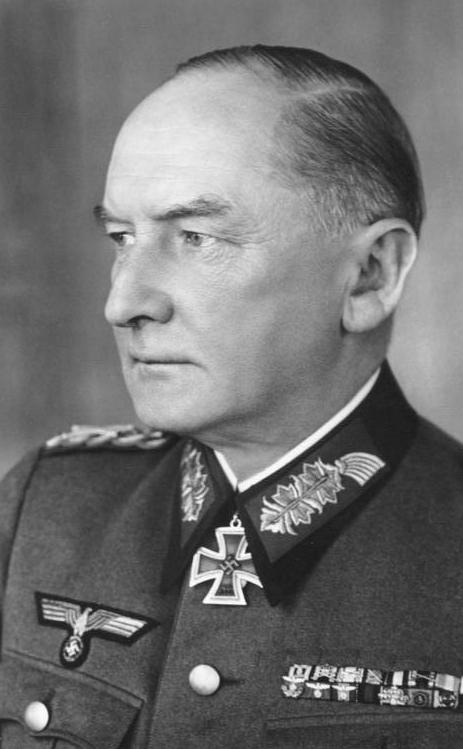
Erwin von Witzleben

1. Armee was based along the French border
General der Infanterie Erwin von Witzleben

1. Armee Reserves

75. Infanterie-Division (Generalmajor Ing. Ernst Hammer)
214. Infanterie-Division (Generalmajor Theodor Groppe)
209. Infanterie-Division (Generalmajor Hans Stengel)
223. Infanterie-Division (Generalmajor Paul-Willi Körner)
231. Infanterie-Division (Generalmajor Hans Schönhärl)
246. Infanterie-Division (Generalmajor Erich Denecke)

IX. Armeekorps
General der Infanterie z.V. Hermann Geyer

25. Infanterie-Division (Generalleutnant Christian Hansen)
33. Infanterie-Division (Generalleutnant Hermann Ritter von Speck)
71. Infanterie-Division (Generalmajor Wolfgang Ziegler)

XII. Armeekorps
General der Infanterie Walter Schroth

15. Infanterie-Division (Generalmajor Walter Behschnitt)
34. Infanterie-Division (Generalmajor Hans Behlendorff)
52. Infanterie-Division (Generalmajor Karl-Adolf Hollidt)
79. Infanterie-Division (Generalmajor Karl Strecker)
Grenzkommandantur Sankt Wendel (Generalmajor Karl Weisenberger)
Generalkommando der Grenztruppen Saarpfalz (General der Pioniere Walter Kuntze) (later XXIV. Armeekorps)

6. Infanterie-Division (Generalleutnant Arnold Freiherr von Biegeleben)
9. Infanterie-Division (Generalleutnant Georg von Apell)
36. Infanterie-Division (Generalleutnant Georg Lindemann)

=== 7. Armee ===
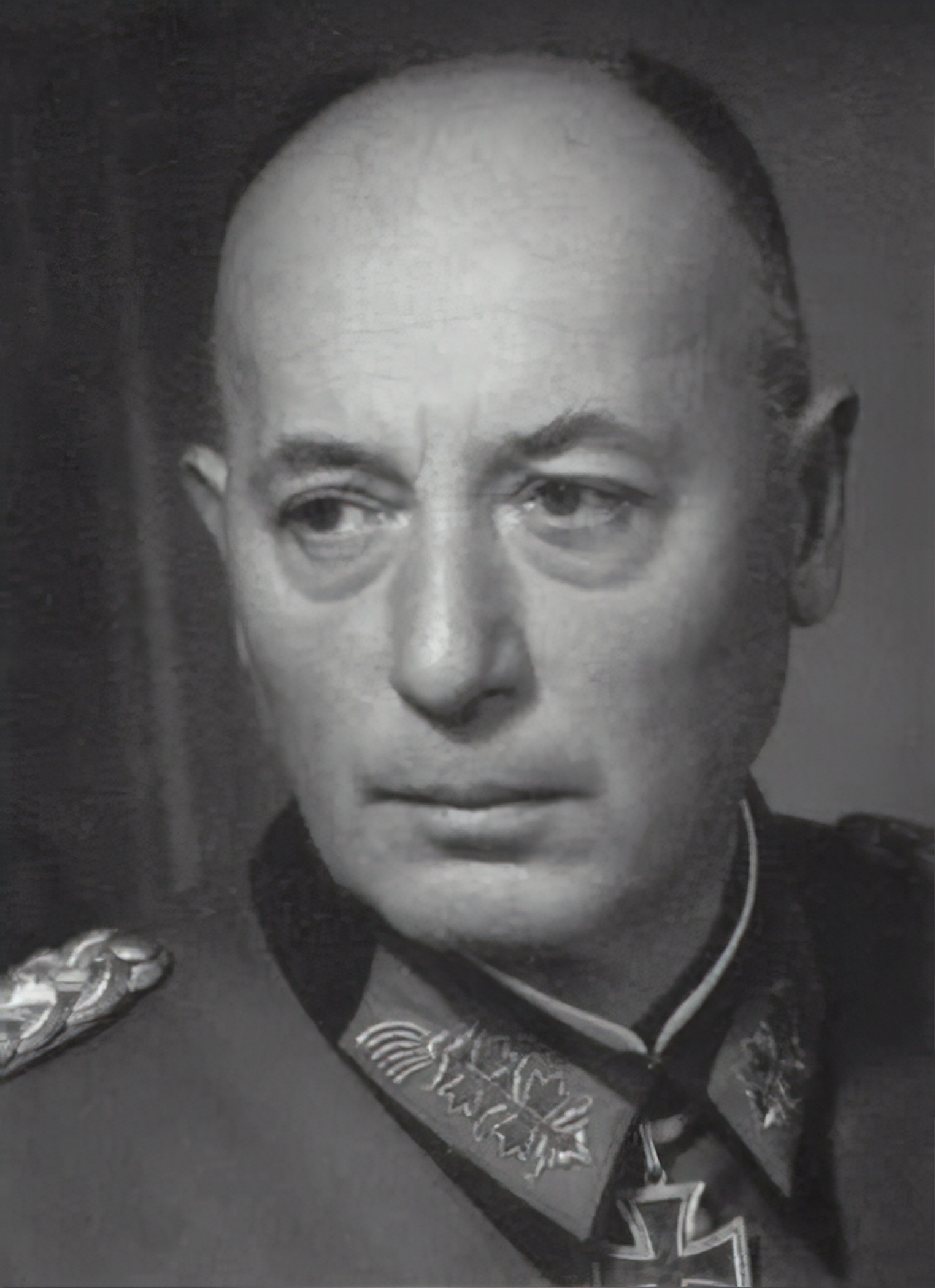
Friedrich Dollmann

7. Armee was based along the French border
General der Artillerie Friedrich Dollmann

7. Armee Reserves

78. Infanterie-Division (Generalleutnant Friedrich Brand)
212. Infanterie-Division (Generalmajor Walter Friedrichs geboren Ochsenmayer)
215. Infanterie-Division (Generalmajor Baptist Knieß)

Generalkommando der Grenztruppen Oberrhein (later XXV. Armeekorps)
General der Infanterie Alfred Wäger

5. Infanterie-Division (Generalleutnant Wilhelm Fahrmbacher)
35. Infanterie-Division (Generalmajor Hans Wolfgang Reinhard)
14. Landwehr-Division (Generalmajor Ernst Richter) (later 205. Infanterie-Division)
SS-Standart (mot.) "Der Führer" (SS-Oberführer Georg Keppler)

== Supporting forces ==
=== Luftwaffe ===
Luftwaffe - Oberbefehlshaber der Luftwaffe Generalfeldmarschall Hermann Göring

- Chef der Generalstabes der Luftwaffe - Oberst Hans Jeschonnek
- Luftflotte 1 - Commanded by General der Flieger Albert Kesselring. Supporting Heeresgruppe Nord.
  - 1. Flieger-Division - Generalmajor Ulrich Grauert, Commanding:
    - I./ (Note: I./, II./, III./, etc is a Gruppe (Group) of an Air Wing.) Kampfgeschwader 1, (Note: Kampfgeschwader: (Combat Squadron) a Bomber Air Wing and is abbreviated KG.) II./ Kampfgeschwader 26, Kampfgeschwader 27, I./ Kampfgeschwader 53, I./ Kampfgeschwader 152, Sturzkampfgeschwader 2, (Note: Sturzkampfgeschwader: (Dive Bomber Squadron) a Dive Bomber Air Wing. Stuka is the short form of Sturzkampfflugzeugand and is abbreviated StG.) IV.(Stuka)/ Lehrgeschwader 1, (Note: Lehrgeschwader: (Teaching Squadron) a School Air Wing and is abbreviated LG.) I.(Jagd) (Note: (Jagd): hunt)/ Lehrgeschwader 2, Zerstörergeschwader 1 (Note: Zerstörergeschwader: (Destroyer Squadron) a Heavy Fighter Air Wing and is abbreviated ZG. The twin engine Messerschmitt Bf 110 fighters were considered attack planes, at this time.)
    - Luftgau-Kommando (Note: Luftgau: (Air District) administrative district within the various military districts (Wehrkreis).) I (Königsberg) - Generalmajor Walter Mußhoff, Commanding: I./ Jagdgeschwader 1, (Note: Jagdgeschwader: (Hunt Squadron) a Fighter Air Wing and is abbreviated JG. The single engine fighters (Ar 68 & Bf 109), were considered defensive weapons, at this time.) I./ Jagdgeschwader 21
    - Luftgau-Kommando III (Berlin) - Generalmajor Hubert Weise, Commanding: I./ Jagdgeschwader 2
    - Luftgau-Kommando IV (Dresden) - Generalmajor Wilhelm Mayer, Commanding: I./ Jagdgeschwader 3, I./ Jagdgeschwader 20
  - Luftwaffenkommando Ostpreußen - Generalleutnant Wilhelm Wimmer, Commanding
    - Kampfgeschwader 3, I./ Sturzkampfgeschwader 1
    - Lehr-Division - Generalmajor Helmut Förster, Commanding: Lehrgeschwader 1 (3 Kampf Gruppe), Kampfgeschwader 2
- Luftflotte 2 - Commanded by General der Flieger Hellmuth Felmy. Supporting Heeresgruppe C.
  - 3. Flieger-Division - Generalmajor Richard Putzier, Commanding:
    - I./ Kampfgeschwader 25, II./ Kampfgeschwader 28, I./ Kampfgeschwader 54
  - 4. Flieger-Division - General der Flieger Alfred Keller, Commanding:
    - I./ Kampfgeschwader 26, Kampfgeschwader 27, Kampfgeschwader 55
    - Luftgau-Kommando VI (Münster) - Generalmajor August Schmidt, Commanding: Jagdgeschwader 26, I./ Jagdgeschwader 52, II./ Zerstörergeschwader 26
    - Luftgau-Kommando XI (Hannover) - General der Flieger Ludwig Wolff, Commanding: II./ Jagdgeschwader 77, Zerstörergeschwader 26
- Luftflotte 3 - Commanded by General der Flieger Hugo Sperrle. Supporting Heeresgruppe C.
  - 5. Flieger-Division - Generalmajor Robert Ritter von Greim, Commanding:
    - Kampfgeschwader 51, I./ Zerstörergeschwader 52
  - 6. Flieger-Division - Generalmajor Otto Deßloch, Commanding:
    - Kampfgeschwader 53, III./ Sturzkampfgeschwader 51, II./ Zerstörergeschwader 76
    - Luftgau-Kommando VII (München) - Generalleutnant Emil Zenetti, Commanding: I./ Jagdgeschwader 51, I./ Jagdgeschwader 71
    - Luftgau-Kommando XII (Wiesbaden) - Generalmajor Friedrich Heiligenbrunner, Commanding: Jagdgeschwader 53
    - Luftgau-Kommando XIII (Nürnberg) - Generalmajor Dr. Eugen Weißmann, Commanding: I./ Jagdgeschwader 70
- Luftflotte 4 - Commanded by General der Flieger Alexander Löhr. Supporting Heeresgruppe Süd.
  - 2. Flieger-Division - Generalmajor Bruno Loerzer, Commanding:
    - Kampfgeschwader 4, Kampfgeschwader 76, Kampfgeschwader 77, I./ Sturzkampfgeschwader 2, I./ Zerstörergeschwader 76
  - Fliegerführer z.b.V. - Generalmajor Wolfram Freiherr von Richthofen, Commanding:
    - II.(Schlacht)/ Lehrgeschwader 2, I./ Sturzkampfgeschwader 76, Sturzkampfgeschwader 77, I./ Zerstörergeschwader 2
  - Luftgau-Kommando VIII (Breslau) - Generalmajor Bernhard Waber, Commanding: I./ Jagdgeschwader 76, I./ Jagdgeschwader 77
  - Luftgau-Kommando XVII (Wien) - Generalmajor Friedrich Hirschauer, Commanding
- 7. Fliegerdivision (Note: 7. Fliegerdivision: later 1. Fallschirmjäger-Division) - Generalmajor Kurt Student, Commanding:
- Fallschirmjäger (Note: Fallschirmjäger: literally "Parachute hunter" paratroops)-Regiment 1, 2, Kampfgeschwader z.b.V. 1, (Note: Kampfgeschwader z.b.V.: (Combat Squadron for Special Purpose) a Transport Air Wing (Ju 52) and is abbreviated KG z.b.V.) Kampfgruppe z.b.V. 9
    - 16. Luftlande-Infanterie (Note: Luftlande-Infanterie: (Air Landing Infantry) glider troops. The 16. Infanterie-Regiment of the 22. Infaterie-Division was undergoing training as glider troops. Eventually the 22. Infanterie-Division became 22. Luftlande-Infanterie-Division.)-Regiment of the 22. Infanterie-Division

=== Kriegsmarine ===
On August 30 the Polish Navy, realizing what was about to happen, sent three destroyers (Błyskawica, Grom, and Burza) to the UK. The group was spotted the 30th in the southern Baltic Sea by U 31 (Note: The format of U.##, U-## and U## will be seen in common use but the correct format is U ##.) and again, in the Skagerrak, by U 19 on 31 August. Since the war had not started they were unmolested. With the destroyers gone some of the ships deployed to the Baltic were recalled and some sent to the North Sea. The fleet was in the process of shifting its deployment when the war broke out. Later, the submarines Orzeł and Wilk also made it to the UK, while the Sęp, Ryś and Żbik, sought internment in Sweden.

Kriegsmarine - Oberbefehlshaber der Kriegsmarine Generaladmiral Erich Raeder

- Chef des Stabes der Seekriegsleitung (Skl) (Note: Seekriegsleitung: (Sea War Leadership) the Operations Section) - Konteradmiral Otto Schniewind
  - Chef der Flotte / Flottenchef (Note: Chef der Flotte / Flottenchef: (Chief of the Fleet) Fleet Commander) - Admiral Hermann Boehm
  - Befehlshaber der Panzerschiffe (Note: Befehlshaber der Panzerschiffe: (Commander of Armoured Ships) type commander for battleships & panzerships.) - Vizeadmiral Wilhelm Marschall
  - Befehlshaber der Aufklärungsstreitkräfte (Note: Befehlshaber der Aufklärungsstreitkräfte: (Commander of Reconnaissance Forces) type commander of cruisers) - Vizeadmiral Hermann Densch
  - Führer der Torpedoboote (Note: Führer der Torpedoboote: (Leader of Torpedo Boats) this includes both torpedoboats and destroyers) - Konteradmiral Günter Lütjens
  - Führer der Unterseeboote (Note: Führer der Unterseeboote: (Leader of Submarines)) - Kapitän zur See Karl Dönitz
    - Führer der Unterseeboote West - Kapitän zur See Karl Dönitz
    - Führer der Unterseeboote Ost - Fregattenkapitän Oskar Schomburg

Under Direct Control of Seekriegsleitung (Skl)

- Admiral Graf Spee (Panzerschiff (Note: Panzerschiff: ("armoured ship!) later reclassified as a heavy cruiser)) - Kapitän zur See Hans Langsdorff: en route to South Atlantic
- Deutschland {Panzerschiff} - Kapitän zur See Paul Wenneker: North Atlantic
- Altmark (Troßschiff (Note: Troßschiff: (Supply Ship) a replenishment ship with fuel, food, ammunition, etc.)) - Kapitänleutnant der Reserve Heinrich Dau: operating with ADMIRAL GRAF SPEE
- Westerwald {Troßschiff} - Korvettenkapitän R. Peter Grau: operating with DEUTSCHLAND
- U 27 - Kapitänleutnant Johannes Franz: North Atlantic (Note: The entire Flotilla (for the Map Grids see: https://uboat.net/maps/grid.html): Unterseebootsflottille "Salzwedel" - Korvettenkapitän Hans Ibbeken: U 26 [Type IA] - Nordsee, Grid AN43; U 27 [Type VIIA] - North Atlantic, Grid AM19; U 28 [Type VIIA] - North Atlantic, Grid AM75; U 29 [Type VIIA] - North Atlantic, Grid AL66; U 30 [Type VIIA] - North Atlantic, Grid AL28; U 31 [Type VIIA] - Ostsee, Grid AO77; U 32 [Type VIIA] - Ostsee, returning to Kiel; U 33 [Type VIIA] - North Atlantic, Grid BE26; U 34 [Type VIIA] - North Atlantic, Grid BE35; U 35 [Type VIIA] - Ostsee, returning to Kiel)
- U 28 - Kapitänleutnant Günter Kuhnke: North Atlantic
- U 29 - Kapitänleutnant Otto Schuhart: North Atlantic
- U 30 - Kapitänleutnant Fritz-Juluis Lemp: North Atlantic
- U 33 - Kapitänleutnant Hans-Wilhelm von Dresky: North Atlantic
- U 34 - Kapitänleutnant Wilhelm Rollman: North Atlantic
- U 37 - Kapitänleutnant Heinrich Schuch: North Atlantic (Note: The entire Flotilla (for the Map Grids see: https://uboat.net/maps/grid.html): Unterseebootsflottille "Hundius" - Korvettenkapitän Werner Hartmann: U 37 [Type IXA] - North Atlantic, Grid CF31; U 38 [Type IXA] - North Atlantic, Grid CF62; U 39 [Type IXA] - North Atlantic, Grid AM16; U 40 [Type IXA] - North Atlantic, Grid CF67; U 41 [Type IXA] - North Atlantic, Grid CF67; U 42 [Type IXA] - training at Bremen; U 43 [Type IXA] - training at Bremen)
- U 38 - Kapitänleutnant Heinrich Liebe: North Atlantic
- U 39 - Kapitänleutnant Gerhard Glattes: North Atlantic
- U 40 - Kapitänleutnant Werner von Schmidt: North Atlantic
- U 41 - Kapitänleutnant Gustav-Adolf Mugler: North Atlantic
- U 45 - Kapitänleutnant Alexander Gelhaar: North Atlantic (Note: The entire Flotilla (for the Map Grids see: https://uboat.net/maps/grid.html): Unterseebootsflottille "Wegener" - Korvettenkapitän Ernst Andreas Sobe: U 45 [Type VIIB] - North Atlantic, Grid AL77; U 46 [Type VIIB] - North Atlantic, Grid BE24; U 47 [Type VIIB] - North Atlantic, Grid BF48; U 48 [Type VIIB] - North Atlantic, Grid BE59; U 49 [Type VIIB] - training at Kiel; U 51 [Type VIIB] - refitting at Kiel; U 52 [Type VIIB] - North Atlantic, Grid BE74; U 53 [Type VIIB] - training at Kiel)
- U 46 - Kapitänleutnant Herbert Sohler: North Atlantic
- U 47 - Korvettenkapitän Gunther Prien: North Atlantic
- U 48 - Kapitänleutnant Herbert Schultze: North Atlantic
- U 52 - Kapitänleutnant Wolfgang Barten: North Atlantic

=== Marinegruppenkommando West ===
Oberbefehlshaber Marinegruppenkommando (Note: Marinegruppenkommando (Marine/Navy Group Command) in charge of all naval assets in a defined area) West - Admiral Alfred Saalwächter

- Kommandierender Admiral der Marinestation der Nordsee - Admiral Rolf Carls
- Führer der Unterseeboote West - Kapitän zur See Karl Dönitz
- At sea (North Sea)
  - Nürnberg (light cruiser) - Kapitän zur See Otto Klüber (Flag Befehlshaber der Aufklärungsstreitkräfte - Vizeadmiral Hermann Densch) (Note: These four cruisers were being redeployed and were transiting the Kaiser Wilhelm Canal from the Baltic to the North Sea)
  - Köln (light cruiser) - Kapitän zur See Theodor Burchardi
  - Königsberg (light cruiser) - Kapitän zur See Kurt Caesar Hoffmann
  - Leipzig (light cruiser) - Kapitän zur See Heinz Nordmann
  - U 9 - Kapitänleutnant Ludwig Mathes (Note: The entire Flotilla (for the Map Grids see: https://uboat.net/maps/grid.html): Unterseebootsflottille "Weddingen" - Kapitänleutnant Hans Eckermann, m.F.b.: U 9 [Type IIB] - North Sea,, Grid AN47; U 13 [Type IIB] - rearming at Keil / departs September 2 (Nordsee); U 15 [Type IIB] - North Sea, Grid AN83; U 17 [Type IIB] - North Sea,, Grid AN82; U 19 [Type IIB] - North Sea,, Grid AN59; U 21 [Type IIB] - North Sea,, Grid AN85; U 23 [Type IIB] - Nordsee, Grid AN82)
  - U 12 - Kapitänleutnant Dietrich von der Ropp (Note: The entire Flotilla (for the Map Grids see: https://uboat.net/maps/grid.html): Unterseebootsflottille "Lohs" - Kapitänleutnant Hans Eckermann: U 12 [Type IIB] - North Sea,, Grid AN61; U 14 [Type IIB] - Ostsee, Grid AO94; U 16 [Type IIB] - rearming at Wilhelmshaven / North Sea, 2 September; U 18 [Type IIB] - North Sea,, Grid AO94; U 20 [Type IIB] - rearming at Wilhelmshaven / North Sea, 1 September; U 22 [Type IIB] - Baltic, Grid AO91; U 24 [Type IIB] - rearming at Wilhelmshaven / departs September 2 (North Sea))
  - U 15 - Kapitänleutnant Heinz Buchholz
  - U 17 - Kapitänleutnant Heinz von Reiche
  - U 19 - Kapitänleutnant Hans Meckel
  - U 21 - Kapitänleutnant Fritz Frauenheim
  - U 23 - Kapitänleutnant Otto Kretschmer
  - U 26 - Korvettenkapitän Klaus Ewerth
  - U 36 - Kapitänleutnant Wilhelm Fröhlich (Note: The entire Flotilla (for the Map Grids see: https://uboat.net/maps/grid.html): Unterseebootsschulflottille - Kapitänleutnant Heinz Beduhn: U 1 [Type IIA] - Neustad; U 2 [Type IIA] - refitting at Keil; U 3 [Type IIA] - Neustad; U 4 [Type IIA] - Neustad; U 5 [Type IIA] - Ostsee, Grid AO48; U 6 [Type IIA] - Ostsee, Grid AO48; U 7 [Type IIB] - Ostsee, Grid AO48; U 8 [Type IIB] - refitting at Keil; U 10 [Type IIB] - refitting at Keil; U 11 [Type IIB] - refitting at Neustad ? (with the Communications Experimental Department); U 25 [Type IA] - refitting at Wilhelmshaven; U 36 [Type VIIA] - Nordsee, Grid AN31)
  - U 56 - Kapitänleutnant Wilhelm Zahn (Note: The entire Flotilla (for the Map Grids see: https://uboat.net/maps/grid.html): Unterseebootsflottille "Emsmann" - Korvettenkapitän Hans Rösing: U 56 [Type IIC] - Nordsee, Grid AN37; U 57 [Type IIC] - Ostsee, Grid AO96; U 58 [Type IIC] - Nordsee, Grid AN37; U 59 [Type IIC] - Nordsee, Grid AN61; U 60 [Type IIC] - training at Kiel; U 61 [Type IIC] - training at Kiel)
  - U 58 - Kapitänleutnant Herbert Kuppisch
  - U 59 - Kapitänleutnant Harald Jurst
- At Wilhelmshaven
  - Scharnhorst {Schlachtschiff} - Kapitän zur See Otto Ciliax: Kriegsmarinewerft for modifications
  - Admiral Scheer {Panzerschiff} - Kapitän zur See Hans-Heinrich Wurmbach
  - Emden (light cruiser) - Kapitän zur See Werner Lange
  - Karlsruhe (light cruiser) - Kapitän zur See Friedrirch Rieve: refitting
  - 2. Zerstörerflottille (Note: The entire Destroyer Flotilla: 2. Zerstörerflottille - Kapitän zur See Friedrich Bonte at Wilhelmshaven: Leberecht Maas (Z 1) [Type 1934] (Führerboot) at Pillau; Paul Jakobi (Z 5) [Type 1934A] refitting at Wilhelmshaven (Flag 2. Zerstörerflottille); Theodor Riedel (Z 6) [Type 1934A] at Wilhelmshaven; Hermann Schoemann (Z 7) [Type 1934A] at Wilhelmshaven; Karl Galster (Z 20) [Type 1936] at Wilhelmshaven; Wilhelm Heidkamp (Z 21) [Type 1936] outfitting at Kiel) - Kapitän zur See Friedrich Bonte:
    - Paul Jakobi (Z 5) - Korvettenkapitän Hans G. Zimmer: refitting (Flag 2. Zerstörerflottille)
    - Theodor Riedel (Z 6) - Korvettenkapitän Gerhardt Bohmig
    - Hermann Schoemann (Z 7) - Korvettenkapitän Theodor Detmers
    - Karl Galster (Z 20) - Korvettenkapitän Theodor Bechtolsheim
  - 4. Zerstörerflottille (Note: he entire Destroyer Flotilla: 4. Zerstörer-Flottille - Fregattenkapitän Erich Bey at Wilhelmshaven: Bruno Heinemann (Z 8) [Type 1934A] at Swinemünde; Wolfgang Zenker (Z 9) [Type 1934A] at Danzig; Hans Lody (Z 10) [Type 1934A] at Wilhelmshaven (Flag 4. Zerstörerflottille); Bernd von Arnim (Z 11) [Type 1934A] at Danzig; Erich Giese (Z 12) [Type 1934A] at Hamburg; Erich Koellner (Z 13) [Type 1934A] outfitting at Kiel) - Fregattenkapitän Erich Bey:
    - Hans Lody (Z 10) - Korvettenkapitän Hubert Freiherr von Wagenheim (Flag 4. Zerstörerflottille)
  - 5. Zerstörerdivision (Note: The entire Destroyer Division: 5. Zerstörer-Division - Fregattenkapitän Hans Hartmann at Wilhelmshaven: Dieter von Roeder (Z 17) [Type 1936] at Wilhelmshaven; Hans Lüdemann (Z 18) [Type 1936] at Wilhelmshaven (Flag 5. Zerstörerdivision); Hermann Künne (Z 19) [Type 1936] at Kiel) - Korvettenkapitän Herbert Friedrichs:
    - Dieter von Roeder (Z 17) - Korvettenkapitän Erich Holtorf
    - Hans Lüdemann (Z 18) - Korvettenkapitän Herbert Friedrichs (Flag 5. Zerstörerdivision)
  - 6. Torpedobootsflottille (Note: The entire Flotilla: 6. Torpedobootsflottille - Korvettenkapitän Georg Waue at Wilhelmshaven: Iltis [[[Type 24 torpedo boat|Type 1924]]] at Wilhelmshaven; Jaguar [Type 1924] at Wilhelmshaven; Leopard [Type 1924] at Wilhelmshaven (Flag 6. Torpedobootsflottille); Luchs [Type 1924] at Wilhelmshaven; Seeadler [Type 1923] at Wilhelmshaven; Wolf [Type 1924] at Wilhelmshaven) - Korvettenkapitän Georg Waue:
    - Iltis - Kapitänleutnant Heinz Schuur
    - Jaguar - Kapitänleutnant Franz Kolhauf
    - Leopard - Kapitänleutnant Karl Kassbaum (Flag 6. Torpedobootsflottille)
    - Luchs - Kapitänleutnant Eckart Prolss
    - Seeadler - Kapitänleutnant Werner Hartenstein
    - Wolf - Kapitänleutnant Lutz Gerstung
  - U 25 - Oberleutnant zur See Georg Heinz Michel: refitting
- At Brunsbüttel
  - Gneisenau (battleship) - Kapitän zur See Erich Förste: Flottenflaggschiff
- At Kiel
  - Schlesien {Linienschiff} - Kapitän zur See Kurt Utke
  - Admiral Hipper (heavy cruiser) - Kapitän zur See Hellmuth Heye: refitting
  - Blücher (heavy cruiser) - {Kapitän zur See Heinrich Woldag}: finishing at Deutsche Werke, commissioned September 20
  - Erich Koellner (Z 13) - Fregattenkapitän Alfred Schulze-Hinrichs: outfitting
  - Hermann Künne (Z 19) - Fregattenkapitän Friedrich Kothe
  - Wilhelm Heidkamp (Z 21) - Korvettenkapitän Hans Erdmenger: outfitting
  - 5. Torpedobootsflottille (Note: The entire Flotilla: 5. Torpedobootsflottille - Fregattenkapitän Rudolf Heyke at Kiel: Albatros [Type 1923] at Kiel; Falke [Type 1923] at Kiel; Greif [Type 1923] at Kiel; Kondor [Type 1923] at Kiel; Möwe [Type 1923] at Kiel; (Tiger [Type 1924] - Kapitänleutnant Helmut Neuss, lost in collision with Max Schulz (Z 3) August 27)) - Fregattenkapitän Rudolf Heyke:
    - Albatros - Kapitänleutnant Herbert Max Schultze
    - Falke - Kapitänleutnant Günter Hessler
    - Greif - Kapitänleutnant Wilhelm Verlohr
    - Kondor - Kapitänleutnant Hans Wilcke
    - Möwe - Kapitänleutnant Konrad Edler von Rennenkampf
  - U 2 - Kapitänleutnant Helmut Rosenbaum: refitting
  - U 8 - Kapitänleutnant Georg Peters: refitting
  - U 10 - Kapitänleutnant Georg-Wilhelm Schulz: refitting
  - U 13 - Kapitänleutnant Karl Daublebsky von Eichhain: rearming / departs September 2 (Nordsee)
  - U 16 - Kapitänleutnant Hannes Weingaertner: rearming / departs September 2 (Nordsee)
  - U 20 - Kapitänleutnant Karl-Heinz Moehle: rearming / departs September 1 (Nordsee)
  - U 24 - Kapitänleutnant Udo Behrens: rearming / departs September 2 (Nordsee)
  - U 49 - Kapitänleutnant Curt von Gossler: training
  - U 51 - Kapitänleutnant Dietrich Knorr: training
  - U 53 - Kapitänleutnant Ernst-Gunther Heinicke: training
  - U 60 - Kapitänleutnant Georg Schewe: training
  - U 61 - Kapitänleutnant Jurgen Oesten: training
- At Hamburg
  - Erich Giese (Z 12) - Korvettenkapitän Karl Smidt
- At Bremen
  - Anton Schmitt (Z 22) - {Korvettenkapitän Friedrich Böhme}: finishing at DeSchiMAG, commissioned September 24
  - U 42 - Kapitänleutnant Rolf Dau: training
  - U 43 - Kapitänleutnant Wilhelm Ambrosius: training
- At Neustad
  - Unterseebootsschulflottille (Note: Unterseebootsschulflottille: "U-boat School Flotilla" the hands on training equipment of the Unterseebootsschule (U-boat School)) - Kapitänleutnant Heinz Beduhn:
    - U 1 - Kapitänleutnant Jurgen Deecke
    - U 3 - Kapitänleutnant Joachim Schepke
    - U 4 - Kapitänleutnant Harro von Klot-Heydenfeldt
    - U 11 - Kapitänleutnant Viktor Schultze: refitting?

=== Marinegruppenkommando Ost ===
Oberbefehlshaber Marinegruppenkommando Ost - Generaladmiral Conrad Albrecht

- Kommandierender Admiral der Marinestation der Ostsee - Admiral Rolf Carls
- At sea (Baltic)
  - 1. Zerstörerflottille (Note: The entire destroyer flotilla: 1. Zerstörerflottille - Kapitän zur See Wilhelm Meisel in Ostsee: Georg Thiele (Z 2) Type 1934 in Ostsee; Max Schulz (Z 3) [Type 1934] at Stettin (repairing after collision with Torpedoboote Tiger August 27); Richard Beitzen (Z 4) [Type 1934] in Ostsee (Flag 1. Zerstörerflottille); Friedrich Ihn (Z 14) Type 1934A at Swinemünde; Erich Steinbrinck (Z 15) [Type 1934A] in Ostsee; Friedrich Eckoldt (Z 16) [Type 1934A] at Pillau) - Kapitän zur See Wilhelm Meisel:
    - Georg Thiele (Z 2) - Korvettenkapitän Max-Eckart Wolff
    - Richard Beitzen (Z 4) - Korvettenkapitän Moritz Schmidt (Flag 1. Zerstörerflottille)
    - Erich Steinbrinck (Z 15) - Korvettenkapitän Rolf Johannesson
  - U 5 - Kapitänleutnant Gunter Kutschmann
  - U 6 - Kapitänleutnant Joachim Matz
  - U 7 - Oberleutnant zur See Otto Salmann
  - U 14 - Kapitänleutnant Horst Willner
  - U 18 - Kapitänleutnant Max-Hermann Bauer
  - U 22 - Kapitänleutnant Werner Winter
  - U 31 - Kapitänleutnant Wilfred Prellberg: Ostsee
  - U 32 - Korvettenkapitän Paul Buchel: Ostsee / returning to Kiel
  - U 35 - Kapitänleutnant Werner Lott: Ostsee / returning to Kiel
  - U 57 - Kapitänleutnant Claus Korth
- At Danzig
  - Schleswig-Holstein (Linienschiff) - Kapitän zur See Gustav Kleikamp
  - Wolfgang Zenker (Z 9) - Korvettenkapitän Gottfried Ponitz
  - Bernd von Arnim (Z 11) - Korvettenkapitän Kurt Rechel
- At Pillau
  - Friedrich Eckoldt (Z 16) - Korvettenkapitän Alfred Schemmel
  - Leberecht Maas (Z 1) - Korvettenkapitän Fritz Bassenge (Flag Führer der Torpedoboote Konteradmiral Gunther Lütjens)
- At Stettin
  - Max Schulz (Z 3) - Korvettenkapitän Claus Trampedac: damaged in collision and not operational
- At Swinemünde
  - Bruno Heinemann (Z 8) - Korvettenkapitän Fritz Berger
  - Friedrich Ihn (Z 14) - Korvettenkapitän Rudolf von Pufendorf

== See also ==
- Polish army order of battle in 1939
- Invasion of Poland
- Waffen-SS Order of Battle
- Wehrmacht
