= Army Group North =

- German: Heeresgruppe Nord
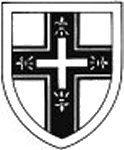
- Active: 2 September 1939 – 10 October 1939; 20 June 1941 – 25 January 1945; 25 January – May 1945
- Country: Nazi Germany
- Branch: Heer ( Wehrmacht)
- Size: 10 September 1943: 919,520 in total

Commanders
- Notable commanders: Fedor von Bock; Wilhelm Ritter von Leeb; Georg von Küchler; Walter Model; Georg Lindemann; Johannes Frießner; Ferdinand Schörner; Lothar Rendulic; Walter Weiß

Army Group North (German: Heeresgruppe Nord) was the name of three separate army groups of the Wehrmacht during World War II. Its rear area operations were organized by the Army Group North Rear Area.

The first Army Group North was deployed during the invasion of Poland and subsequently renamed Army Group B. The second Army Group North was created on 22 June 1941 from the former Army Group C and used in the northern sector of the Eastern Front from 1941 to January 1945. By then, this second Army Group North had gotten trapped in the Courland Pocket and was accordingly redesignated Army Group Courland. On the same day, the former Army Group Center, which was now defending the northernmost sector of the contiguous Eastern Front, was renamed Army Group North, assuming the status of the third and final iteration of the army group.

== First deployment of Army Group North: September – October 1939 ==
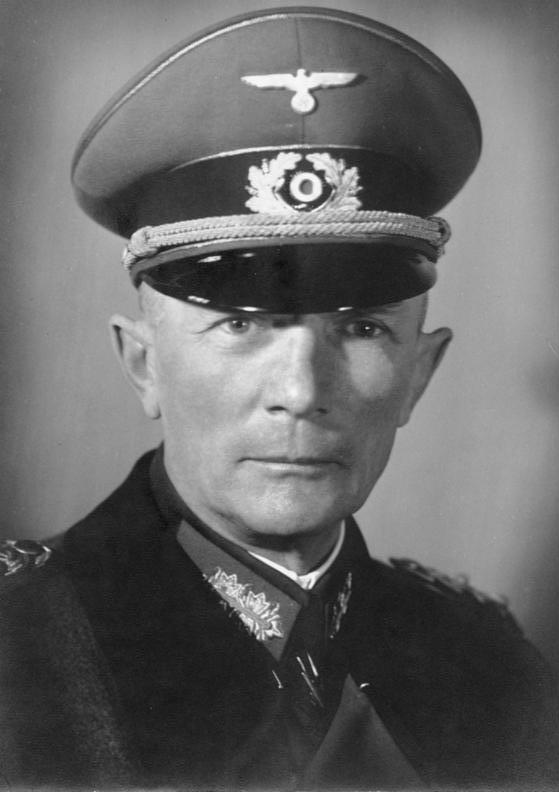
Fedor von Bock, commander of Army Group North in September 1939

The staff of Army Group North was formally assembled on 2 September 1939 from the headquarters of 2nd Army, which in turn had been activated just a few days prior, on 26 August. Fedor von Bock, commanding general of 2nd Army, became the first commanding general of Army Group North.

During the Invasion of Poland, Army Group North had two armies placed under its supervision: 3rd Army (Georg von Küchler) and 4th Army (Günther von Kluge). Additionally, it held four divisions as part of its army group reserves: 10th Panzer Division, 73rd Infantry Division, 206th Infantry Division and 208th Infantry Division.

On the morning of 1 September 1939, 3rd Army began its advance from East Prussia southwards towards central Poland, whereas 4th Army attacked from Pomerania into the Danzig Corridor.

Important battles by the 3rd Army during the Polish campaign included the Battle of Grudziądz, the Battle of Mława, the Battle of Różan, the Battle of Łomża, the Battle of Wizna and the Battle of Brześć Litewski. Important battles of the 4th Army included the Battle of Tuchola Forest, the Battle of Westerplatte, the Battle of Hel and the Battle of Gdynia.

Order of battle, 1 September 1939
Army Group	Army	Corps	Division
Army Group North (Fedor von Bock)	3rd Army (Georg von Küchler)	XXI Army Corps (Nikolaus von Falkenhorst)	228th Infantry Division (Hans Suttner)
Army Group North (Fedor von Bock)	3rd Army (Georg von Küchler)	XXI Army Corps (Nikolaus von Falkenhorst)	21st Infantry Division (Kuno-Hans von Both)
Army Group North (Fedor von Bock)	3rd Army (Georg von Küchler)	I Army Corps (Walter Petzel)	11th Infantry Division (Max Bock)
Army Group North (Fedor von Bock)	3rd Army (Georg von Küchler)	I Army Corps (Walter Petzel)	61st Infantry Division (Siegfried Haenicke)
Army Group North (Fedor von Bock)	3rd Army (Georg von Küchler)	I Army Corps (Walter Petzel)	Panzer Division Kempf (Werner Kempf)
Army Group North (Fedor von Bock)	3rd Army (Georg von Küchler)	Corps Wodrig (Albert Wodrig)	1st Infantry Division (Joachim von Kortzfleisch)
Army Group North (Fedor von Bock)	3rd Army (Georg von Küchler)	Corps Wodrig (Albert Wodrig)	12th Infantry Division (Ludwig von der Leyen)
Army Group North (Fedor von Bock)	3rd Army (Georg von Küchler)	Group Brand (Fritz Brand)	Lötzen Infantry Brigade (Otto-Ernst Ottenbacher)
Army Group North (Fedor von Bock)	3rd Army (Georg von Küchler)	Group Brand (Fritz Brand)	Goldap Infantry Brigade (Notle)
Army Group North (Fedor von Bock)	3rd Army (Georg von Küchler)	Army reserves	217th Infantry Division (Richard Baltzer)
Army Group North (Fedor von Bock)	3rd Army (Georg von Küchler)	Army reserves	Grenzschutz-Abschnittskommando 15
Army Group North (Fedor von Bock)	4th Army (Günther von Kluge)	XIX Army Corps (Heinz Guderian)	2nd Infantry Division (Paul Bader)
Army Group North (Fedor von Bock)	4th Army (Günther von Kluge)	XIX Army Corps (Heinz Guderian)	20th Infantry Division (Mauritz von Wiktorin)
Army Group North (Fedor von Bock)	4th Army (Günther von Kluge)	XIX Army Corps (Heinz Guderian)	3rd Panzer Division (Leo Geyr von Schweppenburg)
Army Group North (Fedor von Bock)	4th Army (Günther von Kluge)	II Army Corps (Adolf Strauß)	3rd Infantry Division (Walter Lichel)
Army Group North (Fedor von Bock)	4th Army (Günther von Kluge)	II Army Corps (Adolf Strauß)	32nd Infantry Division (Franz Böhme)
Army Group North (Fedor von Bock)	4th Army (Günther von Kluge)	III Army Corps (Curt Haase)	50th Infantry Division (Konrad Sorsche)
Army Group North (Fedor von Bock)	4th Army (Günther von Kluge)	III Army Corps (Curt Haase)	Brigade Netze
Army Group North (Fedor von Bock)	4th Army (Günther von Kluge)	Associated border guards	Grenzschutz-Abschnittskommando 1
Army Group North (Fedor von Bock)	4th Army (Günther von Kluge)	Associated border guards	Grenzschutz-Abschnittskommando 2
Army Group North (Fedor von Bock)	4th Army (Günther von Kluge)	Associated border guards	Grenzschutz-Abschnittskommando 12
Army Group North (Fedor von Bock)	4th Army (Günther von Kluge)	Army reserves	23rd Infantry Division (Walter Graf von Brockdorff-Ahlefeldt)
Army Group North (Fedor von Bock)	4th Army (Günther von Kluge)	Army reserves	218th Infantry Division (Woldemar Freiherr von Grote)
Army Group North (Fedor von Bock)	Army Group reserves		10th Panzer Division (Ferdinand Schaal)
Army Group North (Fedor von Bock)	Army Group reserves		73rd Infantry Division (Friedrich von Rabenau)
Army Group North (Fedor von Bock)	Army Group reserves		206th Infantry Division (Hugo Höfl)
Army Group North (Fedor von Bock)	Army Group reserves		208th Infantry Division (Moritz Andreas)

== Second deployment of Army Group North: June 1941 – January 1945 ==
=== Invasion of the Soviet Union ===
In preparation for Operation Barbarossa, Army Group North was reformed from Army Group C on 22 June 1941. Army Group North was commanded by Field Marshal Wilhelm Ritter von Leeb and staged in East Prussia. Its strategic goal was Leningrad, with operational objectives being the territories of the Baltic republics and securing the northern flank of Army Group Centre in Northern Russia between Western Dvina River and Daugavpils-Kholm Army Group boundary. On commencement of the Wehrmacht's Baltic offensive operation the army group deployed into Lithuania and northern Belorussia. It served mainly in Baltic territories and north Russia until 1944. Commander in Chief 22 June 1941: Wilhelm Ritter von Leeb.

Its subordinate armies were deployed with the following immediate objectives:

- 18th Army - from Koenigsberg to Ventspils - Jelgava
- 4th Panzer Group - Pskov
- 16th Army - Kaunas, Daugavpils
- Army Group troops
  - Army-Group signals regiment 537
  - Army-Group signals regiment 639 (2nd echelon)

==== The Baltic offensive operation ====
All operational objectives such as Tallinn were achieved despite stubborn Red Army resistance and several unsuccessful counter-offensives such as the Battle of Raseiniai, and the army group approached Leningrad, commencing the Siege of Leningrad. However, while the Baltic states were overrun, the Siege of Leningrad continued until 1944, when it was lifted as a result of the Red Army Leningrad-Novgorod strategic offensive operation.

In September 1941, the Spanish Blue Division was assigned to Army Group North.

==== Northern Russia offensive operation ====
Composition:
October 1941

- 16th Army
- 18th Army

Nevsky Pyatachok
Operation Nordlicht

=== Northern Russia defensive campaign ===
Commander in Chief 17 January 1942: GFM Georg von Küchler

Composition:
September 1942

- 11th Army
- 16th Army
- 18th Army

December 1942

- 16th Army
- 18th Army

Demyansk Pocket
Kholm Pocket
Soviet Toropets-Kholm Operation
Battle of Velikiye Luki
Battle of Krasny Bor

=== Baltic defensive campaign ===
Commander in Chief 9 January 1944: Field marshal Walter Model
Commander in Chief 31 March 1944: Generaloberst Georg Lindemann
Commander in Chief 4 July 1944: Generaloberst Johannes Frießner
Commander in Chief 23 July 1944: GFM Ferdinand Schörner

March 1944

- Army detachment "Narwa"
- 16th Army
- 18th Army

Battle of Narva, consisting of:

1. Battle for Narva Bridgehead and
2. Battle of Tannenberg Line

Combat in South Estonia, 1944
Soviet Baltic Offensive
Battle of Porkuni
Battle of Vilnius (1944)
Battle of Memel

After becoming trapped in the Courland Cauldron after 25 January 1945, the Army Group was renamed Army Group Courland. On the same day, in East Prussia, a new Army Group North was created by renaming Army Group Center. On the 2 April 1945, the army group was dissolved, and the staff formed the 12th Army headquarters.

=== Campaign in East Prussia ===
Army Group North (old Army Group Centre), was driven into an ever smaller pocket around Königsberg in East Prussia. On April 9, 1945 Königsberg finally fell to the Red Army, although remnants of Army Group units continued to resist on the Heiligenbeil & Danzig beachheads until the end of the war in Europe.

October 1944

- 16th Army
- Armee-Abteilung Grasser
- 18th Army

November 1944

- 16th Army
- Armee-Abteilung Kleffel
- 18 Armee

December 1944

- 16th Army
- 18th Army

Soviet East Prussian Offensive
Battle of Königsberg
Heiligenbeil pocket

=== Campaign in West Prussia ===
Commander in Chief 27 January 1945: Generaloberst Dr. Lothar Rendulic
Commander in Chief 12 March 1945: Walter Weiß
Composition:
February 1945

- Armee-Abteilung Samland
- 4th Army

Soviet East Pomeranian Offensive
Battle of Kolberg
Courland Pocket
On the 25 January 1945 Hitler renamed three army groups. Army Group North became Army Group Courland, more appropriate as it had been isolated from Army Group Centre and was trapped in Courland, Latvia; Army Group Centre became Army Group North and Army Group A became Army Group Centre.

Between January and February 1945, Army Group North sustained 213,000 casualties, including 30,000 dead, 126,000 wounded, and 57,000 missing.

== Commanders ==
No.	Portrait	Commander	Took office	Left office	Time in office
1	Fedor von Bock	Generalfeldmarschall; Fedor von Bock (1880–1945)	27 August 1939	20 June 1941	1 year, 297 days
2	Wilhelm Ritter von Leeb	Generalfeldmarschall; Wilhelm Ritter von Leeb (1876–1956)	20 June 1941	17 January 1942	211 days
3	Georg von Küchler	Generalfeldmarschall; Georg von Küchler (1881–1968)	17 January 1942	9 January 1944	1 year, 357 days
4	Walter Model	Generalfeldmarschall; Walter Model (1891–1945)	9 January 1944	31 March 1944	82 days
5	Georg Lindemann	Generaloberst; Georg Lindemann (1884–1963)	31 March 1944	4 July 1944	95 days
6	Johannes Frießner	Generaloberst; Johannes Frießner (1892–1971)	4 July 1944	23 July 1944	19 days
7	Ferdinand Schörner	Generalfeldmarschall; Ferdinand Schörner (1892–1973)	23 July 1944	27 January 1945	188 days
8	Lothar Rendulic	Generaloberst; Lothar Rendulic (1887–1971)	27 January 1945	12 March 1945	44 days
9	Walter Weiß	Generaloberst; Walter Weiß (1890–1967)	12 March 1945	2 April 1945	21 days

== See also ==
- Army Group South
- Army Group Centre
- German order of battle for Operation Fall Weiss
- Police Regiment North

== Bibliography ==
- Frieser, Karl-Heinz; Schmider, Klaus; Schönherr, Klaus; Schreiber, Gerhard; Ungváry, Kristián; Wegner, Bernd (2007). Die Ostfront 1943/44 – Der Krieg im Osten und an den Nebenfronten [The Eastern Front 1943–1944: The War in the East and on the Neighbouring Fronts] (in German). Vol. VIII. München: Deutsche Verlags-Anstalt. ISBN 978-3-421-06235-2.
- Kirchubel, Robert (2005). Operation Barbarossa 1941 (2). Osprey Publishing.
