= Battle of Łomża (1939) =

Invasion of Poland battle during WWII

- Part of Invasion of Poland, World War II
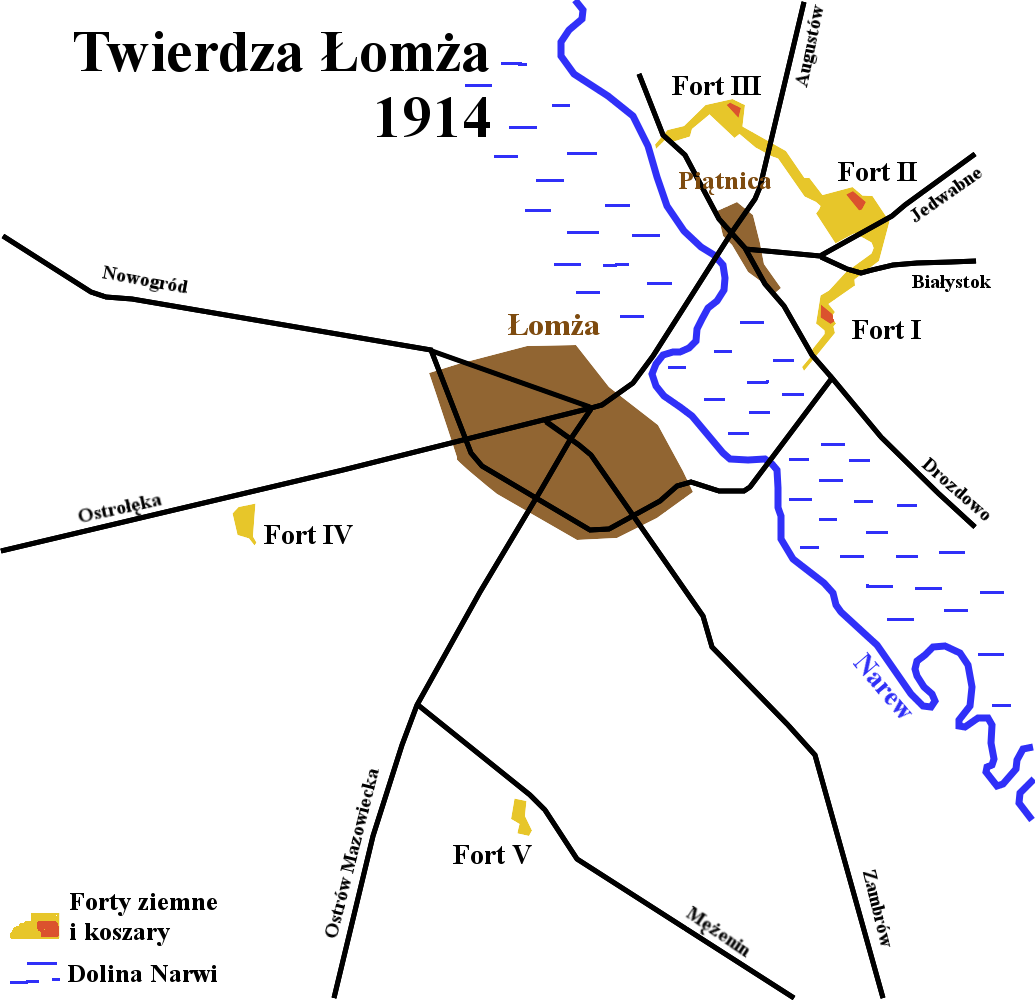
- World War I forts of Łomża Fortress formed the backbone of Polish defence in 1939
Date	7–10 September 1939
Location	Łomża, Warsaw Voivodeship, Poland 53°11′N 22°05′E
Result	German victory

Belligerents
Germany	Poland

Commanders and leaders
Gen. Kuno-Hans von Both; Gen. Nikolaus von Falkenhorst	Maj. Stanisław Wyderko; Lt. Col. Lucjan Stanek

Units involved
21st Infantry Division, elements of 10th Panzer Division	1st Battalion, 33rd Infantry Regiment

Battle of Łomża (7–10 September 1939) was a series of armed engagements during the Nazi German and Soviet Invasion of Poland. The battle took place in and around the town of Łomża, on both sides of the Narew River. Polish forces successfully held a series of pre-First World War forts from repeated German attack before being forced to withdraw due to the position becoming untenable following their losses at the Battle of Wizna and Battle of Nowogród.

== Background ==
The Narew River formed a natural barrier close to the southern borders of East Prussia. The town of Łomża is located on the southern bank of the river, on a high escarpment. The lower, northern bank is mostly flat and swampy. During the 1939 invasion of Poland, the line of the river was manned by forces of Independent Operational Group Narew (SGO Narew), a corps-sized unit of two infantry divisions and two cavalry brigades. The Polish unit was tasked with defending the Narew river line with important bridgeheads at Różan, Ostrołęka, Osowiec Fortress, Nowogród, Łomża and Wizna, and to cover the right flank of the Modlin Army. The cavalry was tasked with organising delaying actions along the Polish-German border and the Biebrza River further to the north-east from Łomża.

Among the most important positions in the region was a fortified bridgehead of Łomża, the so-called Łomża Fortress. The position, consisting of three large forts in Piątnica (Forts I, II and III), on the northern side of the Narew, and two additional isolated forts (Fort IV and V) on the southern bank, was constructed by Imperial Russian Army between 1896 and 1914. Although outdated and unsuitable for modern warfare, the forts in Piątnica were upgraded with trenches, barbed wire obstacles, chevaux de frise and 12 reinforced concrete bunkers in 1939. Similarly the southern bank around Łomża was reinforced with 9 more bunkers, though shortly before the war their machine guns were moved to Piątnica. The forts were manned by 1st Battalion of the 33rd Infantry Regiment (under Maj. Stanisław Wyderko), part of 18th Infantry Division. The machine gun bunkers were manned by 1st MG Company, 1st Battalion, 42nd Infantry Regiment under Lt. Franciszek Zaręba while the trenches around them were manned by two rifle companies of the 33rd regiment. The frontal positions were supported by 1st platoon of 33rd regiment's anti-tank company (under Lt. Zygmunt Olkowski) and a platoon of outdated 76 mm wz. 1902 guns. The southern side of the river was manned by 3rd Rifle Company, 1st Battalion, 33rd Regiment (under Lt. Aleksander Siejak), supported by 3rd battalion, 18th Light Artillery Regiment (under Capt Stanisław Krug) and a howitzer detachment of 18th Heavy Artillery Regiment (Lt. Col. Władysław Brzozowski).

Initially the Germans did not attack from East Prussia during the first week of World War II the front of SGO Narew was mostly stable. After 3 September the town of Łomża was bombarded by the Luftwaffe several times and was set on fire, but the Polish forces suffered only negligible losses. However, after the Battle of the Border and the defeat of Polish forces in the Polish Corridor, elements of Nazi Army Group North broke through to East Prussia and were prepared to push southwards.

== Battle ==
On 7 September, shortly after noon, the 21st Infantry Division of XXI Army Corps (Germany) (under Gen. Nikolaus von Falkenhorst) reached the forward outposts of the Polish positions in front of Łomża. The German commander tried to take the Polish positions by a frontal unprepared attack, aimed towards forts I and II. The attack, carried out by 24th Infantry Regiment of the 21st Division reinforced with tanks of the 8th Panzer Regiment, 10th Panzer Division and artillery, was repelled by Polish machine gun crews and well-placed 37 mm Bofors anti-tank guns. The attacking infantry was repelled with significant losses, the Germans also lost 6 tanks.

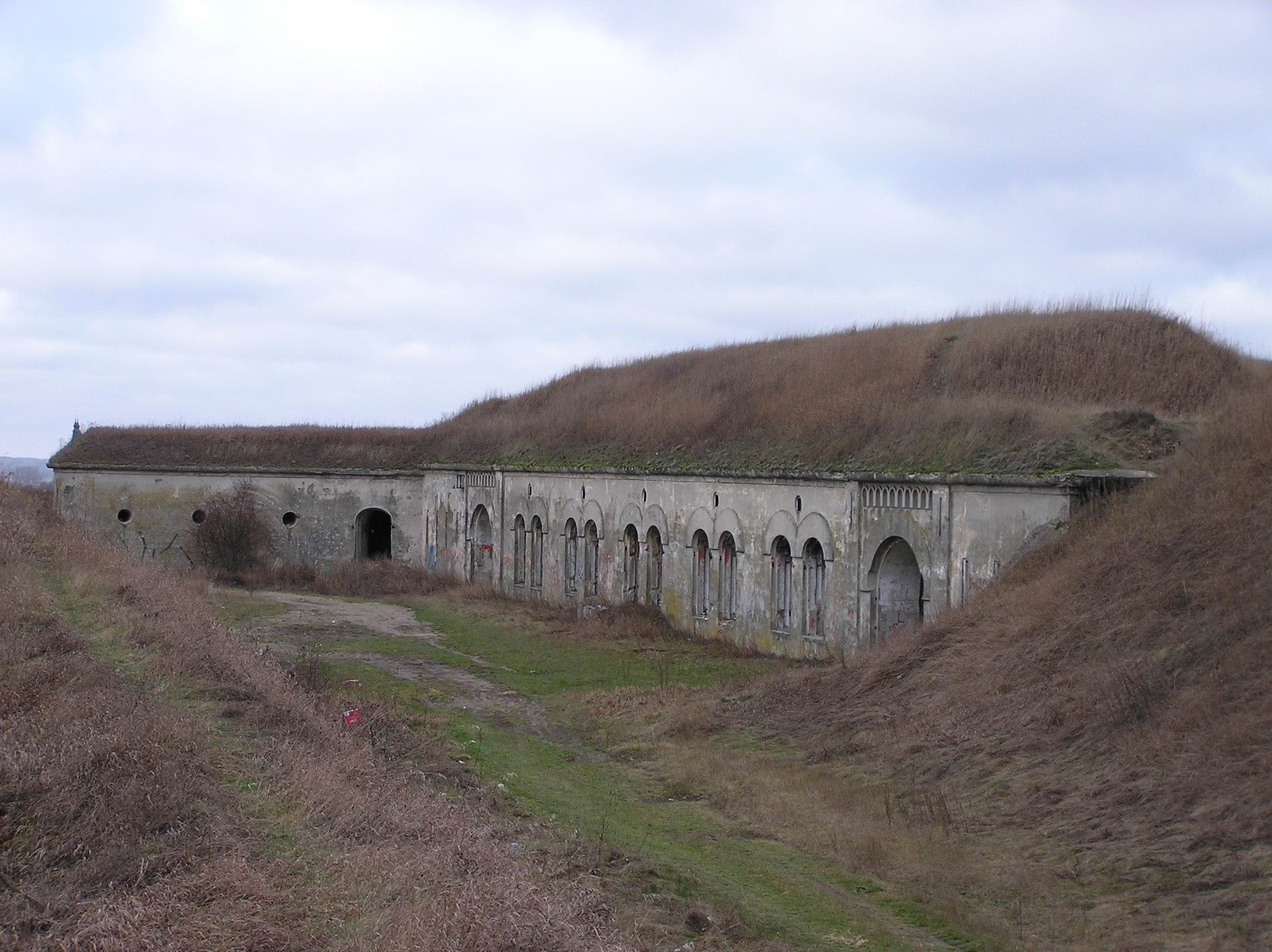
Fort I in Piątnica, modern view

Several repeated attacks were repelled by the 1st Battalion, 33rd Infantry Regiment. In the evening the 21st Division tried to outflank the Łomża bridgehead by fording the Narew, but the Germans were pushed back across the river by vigorous Polish counterattack. By the end of the day the Germans suffered significant losses, the Poles took 57 German soldiers prisoner. The 21st Division withdrew to the north, leaving only a small detachment in front of Polish positions. The following morning after a short artillery barrage the screening detachment surrendered. Overnight Lt. Col. Lucjan Stanek, the commanding officer of the 33rd Regiment, departed the Łomża position to confer with SGO Narew's commanding officer, Gen. Czesław Młot-Fijałkowski.

Before noon the following day the Germans returned, this time attacking forts II and III. Four consecutive assaults were repelled by the defenders. Unable to take the forts, around 14:00 the German commander summoned Luftwaffe close air support. The air bombardment caused significant losses within fort II, it also damaged the bridge across Narew.

However, the Polish positions remained impregnable and repeated German attacks in the afternoon were repelled by the defenders long before the German tanks could reach the vicinity of the bridge. Around that time a large part of the attacking force was withdrawn towards Wizna and Nowogród to force the river crossing there, while the remainder tried to attack Fort I under cover of artillery barrage and air strikes. Although this time Polish losses were higher, this renewed attack was also repelled.

On 10 September the Germans repeated their attacks, again against forts no. II and III. Around noon German bombers arrived, yet the attack stalled. Despite repeated attempts, until the end of the day the Germans did not manage to destroy a single Polish bunker and had to retreat from within the range of Polish artillery.

== Polish withdrawal ==
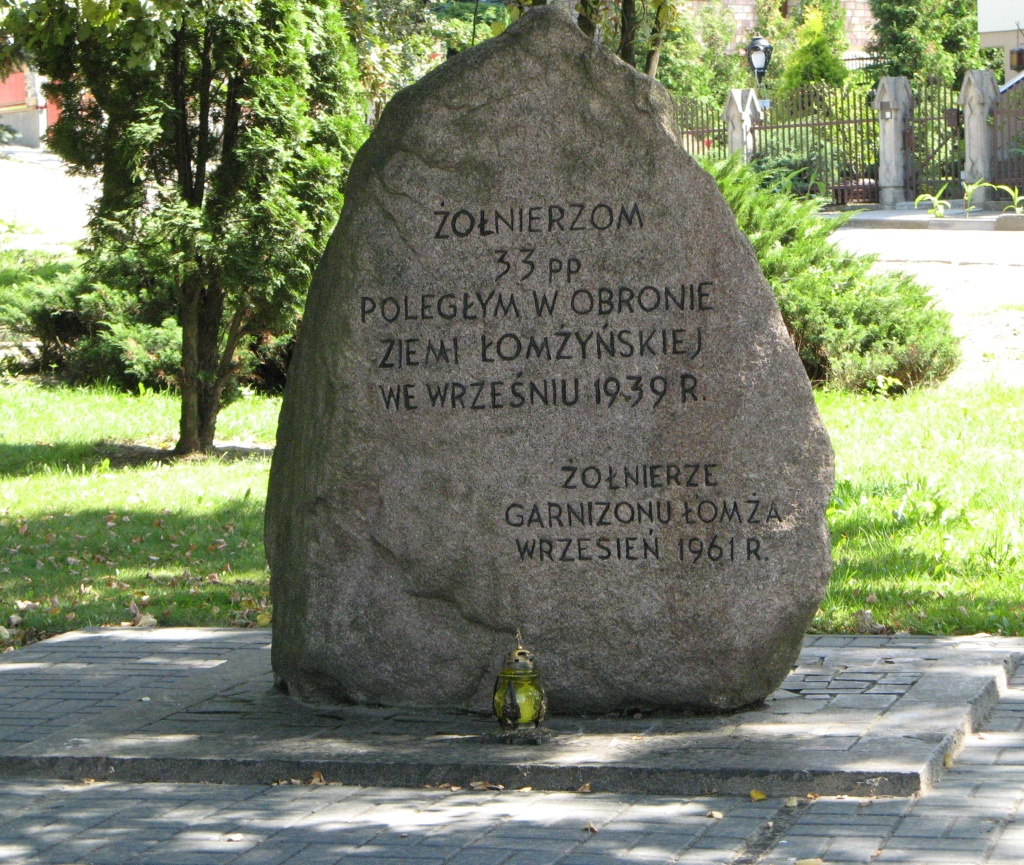
Memorial stone to the soldiers of 33rd Regiment in Łomża

Despite three days of repeated German attacks and significant losses (roughly 30% in dead and wounded), Polish morale was still high. However, soon after 21:00 Col. Stefan Kossecki, commanding officer of the 18th Infantry Division, ordered the Łomża position to be abandoned. The reason was that the Germans were victorious in the Battle of Nowogród and the Poles failed to retake the town. Around the time the Germans also broke through at Wizna and the Narew river line was untenable. The 33rd Regiment withdrew towards Bacze Mokre, the last unit crossed the Narew around 22:00. The following day the German forces captured Łomża unopposed and on 29 September the town was handed over to their Soviet allies.

== See also ==
- List of World War II military equipment of Poland
- List of German military equipment of World War II
