= Erich Dethleffsen =

German Army general (1904-1980)

- Born: 2 August 1904; Kiel
- Died: 4 July 1980 (aged 75); Munich
- Burial place: Munich Waldfriedhof
- Relatives: Nikolaus von Falkenhorst (father in law)
- Military career
- Allegiance: Weimar Republic (to 1933); Nazi Germany
- Branch: Army
- Service years: 1923–1945
- Rank: Generalmajor
- Unit: XXXIX Panzer Corps
- Conflicts: World War II
- Awards: Knight's Cross of the Iron Cross

Erich Dethleffsen (2 August 1904 – 4 July 1980) was a German general from Kiel. He was married to the daughter of Nikolaus von Falkenhorst, who planned the German invasion of Norway and Denmark during World War II.

== Career ==
Dethleffsen joined the Reichsheer in 1923, and was promoted to the German General Staff in 1937. He fought as a Captain in the Heer on the Eastern Front in World War II. Dethleffsen was awarded the Knight's Cross of the Iron Cross for his service. After his recovery, he rose to the rank of Generalmajor, and served on the army General Staff in Adolf Hitler's headquarters. Dethleffsen was arrested on 23 May 1945, and was held until March 1948 in an American Prisoner of War Camp. He was originally held in Luxembourg with Hermann Göring, Joachim von Ribbentrop, and others.

On his release, Dethleffsen became executive secretary of the Wirtschaftspolitische Gesellschaft von 1947 (Society of 1947 for Economic Policy.) The society was used to spread pro-western sentiment in West Germany.

He was the author of Das Wagnis der Freiheit (Tactical Mobility of Carriages) (1952); Soldatische Existenz morgen (1953); Der Artillerie gewidmet (1975); and Robert Martinek: General der Artillerie, Lebensbild eines Soldaten (1975).

Dethleffsen died in Munich on 4 July 1980.

== Decorations and awards ==
- Iron Cross of 1939, 1st and 2nd class
- German Cross in Gold (1 May 1942)
- Knight's Cross of the Iron Cross on 23 December 1943 as Oberst im Generalstab and chief of the Generalstab of the XXXIX Panzer Corps
