= German submarine U-3505 =

German World War II submarine

History

Nazi Germany
- Name: U-3505
- Ordered: 6 November 1943
- Builder: Schichau-Werke, Danzig
- Yard number: 1650
- Laid down: 9 July 1944
- Launched: 25 August 1944
- Commissioned: 7 October 1944
- Fate: Sunk on 3 April 1945

General characteristics
- Class & type: Type XXI submarine
- Displacement: 1,621 t (1,595 long tons) surfaced; 2,100 t (2,067 long tons) submerged
- Length: 76.70 m (251 ft 8 in) (o/a)
- Beam: 8 m (26 ft 3 in)
- Height: 11.30 m (37 ft 1 in)
- Draught: 6.32 m (20 ft 9 in)
- Propulsion: Diesel/Electric; 2 × MAN M6V40/46KBB supercharged 6-cylinder diesel engines, 4,000 PS (2,900 kW; 3,900 shp); 2 × SSW GU365/30 double-acting electric motors, 5,000 PS (3,700 kW; 4,900 shp); 2 × SSW GV232/28 silent running electric motors, 226 PS (166 kW; 223 shp)
- Speed: Surfaced: 15.6 knots (28.9 km/h; 18.0 mph) (diesel); 17.9 knots (33.2 km/h; 20.6 mph) (electric); Submerged: 17.2 knots (31.9 km/h; 19.8 mph) (electric); 6.1 knots (11.3 km/h; 7.0 mph) (silent running motors)
- Range: 15,500 nmi (28,700 km; 17,800 mi) at 10 knots (19 km/h; 12 mph) surfaced; 340 nmi (630 km; 390 mi) at 5 knots (9.3 km/h; 5.8 mph) submerged
- Test depth: 240 m (790 ft)
- Complement: 5 officers, 52 enlisted
- Sensors & processing systems: Type F432 D2 Radar Transmitter; FuMB Ant 3 Bali Radar Detector
- Armament: 6 × bow torpedo tubes; 23 × 53.3 cm (21 in) torpedoes; or 17 × torpedoes and 12 × mines; 4 × 2 cm (0.79 in) C/30 AA guns

Service record
- Part of: 8th U-boat Flotilla; 7 October 1944 – 15 February 1945; 5th U-boat Flotilla; 16 February – 3 April 1945
- Identification codes: M 46 656
- Commanders: Oblt.z.S. Horst Willner; 7 October 1944 – 3 April 1945
- Operations: None
- Victories: None

German submarine U-3505 was a Type XXI submarine of Nazi Germany's Kriegsmarine during World War II. The U-boat was laid down on 9 July 1944 at the Schichau-Werke yard at Danzig, launched on 25 August 1944, and commissioned on 7 October 1944 under the command of Oberleutnant zur See Horst Willner.

== Design ==
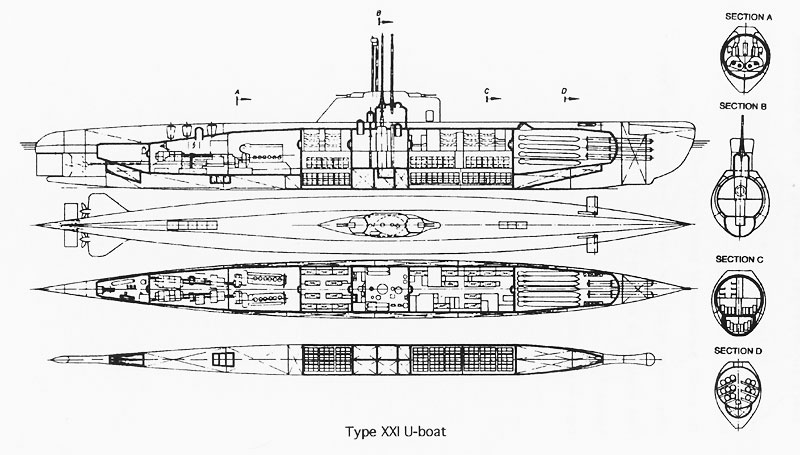
SRH025-p40

Like all Type XXI U-boats, U-3505 had a displacement of 1,621 tonnes (1,595 long tons) when at the surface and 1,819 tonnes (1,790 long tons) while submerged. She had a total length of 76.70 m (251 ft 8 in) (o/a), a beam of 8 m (26 ft 3 in), and a draught of 6.32 m (20 ft 9 in). The submarine was powered by two MAN SE supercharged six-cylinder M6V40/46KBB diesel engines each providing 4,000 metric horsepower (2,900 kilowatts; 3,900 shaft horsepower), two Siemens-Schuckert GU365/30 double-acting electric motors each providing 5,000 PS (3,700 kW; 4,900 shp), and two Siemens-Schuckert silent running GV232/28 electric motors each providing 226 PS (166 kW; 223 shp).

The submarine had a maximum surface speed of 15.6 knots (28.9 km/h; 18.0 mph) and a submerged speed of 17.2 knots (31.9 km/h; 19.8 mph). When running on silent motors the boat could operate at a speed of 6.1 knots (11.3 km/h; 7.0 mph). When submerged, the boat could operate at 5 knots (9.3 km/h; 5.8 mph) for 340 nautical miles (630 km; 390 mi); when surfaced, she could travel 15,500 nautical miles (28,700 km; 17,800 mi) at 10 knots (19 km/h; 12 mph). U-3505 was fitted with six 53.3 cm (21.0 in) torpedo tubes in the bow and four 2 cm (0.79 in) C/30 anti-aircraft guns. She could carry twenty-three torpedoes or seventeen torpedoes and twelve mines. The complement was five officers and fifty-two men.

== Service history ==
Although never used in combat, the submarine achieved some degree of fame due to a rescue mission. Her commander, Captain Horst Willner, disguised his wife as a sailor and smuggled her aboard together with their three-month-old baby (a crime punishable by death). The captain's family was originally to be evacuated on MV Wilhelm Gustloff, joining a flood of refugees fleeing East Prussia ahead of the advancing Red Army, in "Operation Hannibal". Willner cancelled their places and took them onto his submarine, and so probably saved their lives since Gustloff was sunk by the Soviet submarine S-13 with the greatest loss of life in maritime history.

After leaving Danzig they went to Gotenhafen, where they took on board 110 children and adolescents. The refugees, including the captain's family, were safely delivered at Travemünde, Lübeck on 2 April 1945.

Returning to Kiel, U-3505 was to participate in torpedo exercises, but on 3 April was sunk in a bombing raid while in harbour. At least one sailor was killed.

== Bibliography ==
- Busch, Rainer; Röll, Hans-Joachim (1999). German U-boat commanders of World War II : a biographical dictionary. Translated by Brooks, Geoffrey. London, Annapolis, Md: Greenhill Books, Naval Institute Press. ISBN 1-55750-186-6.
- Busch, Rainer; Röll, Hans-Joachim (1999). Der U-Boot-Krieg, 1939-1945: Deutsche U-Boot-Verluste von September 1939 bis Mai 1945 [German U-boat losses from September 1939 to May 1945] (in German). Vol. IV. Hamburg, Berlin, Bonn: Mittler. ISBN 3-8132-0514-2.
- Gröner, Erich; Jung, Dieter; Maass, Martin (1991). U-boats and Mine Warfare Vessels. German Warships 1815–1945. Vol. 2. Translated by Thomas, Keith; Magowan, Rachel. London: Conway Maritime Press. ISBN 0-85177-593-4.
