= Hans Piekenbrock =

Hans Friedrich Max (Heinz) Piekenbrock
- Born: 3 October 1893; Essen, German Empire
- Died: 16 December 1959 (aged 66); Porz-Wahn, Cologne, West Germany
- Military career
- Allegiance: German Empire (to 1918); Weimar Republic (to 1933)Nazi Germany
- Branch: Imperial German Army; Reichswehr; Army (Wehrmacht)
- Service years: 1914–1945
- Rank: Generalleutnant
- Commands: 208th Infantry Division
- Conflicts: World War I World War II
- Awards: Knight's Cross of the Iron Cross; German Cross in gold

Hans Piekenbrock (3 October 1893 – 16 December 1959) was a German general in the Wehrmacht during World War II. He was a recipient of the Knight's Cross of the Iron Cross.

Piekenbrock was born in Essen in 1893 and entered the Royal Prussian Army on the outbreak of World War I. At the end of the war, he was an Oberleutnant in Hussar Regiment 11. He remained in the post-war Reichswehr as a career officer. Between 1934 and 1936, he served as the chief of staff to the Military District III in Berlin, and to the 18th Infantry Division. Between 1936 and 1943, Piekenbrock was posted to the staff of OKW as a staff officer. He took over as commander of the 208th Infantry Division in June 1943 and led this unit until Germany's surrender in May 1945.

== Awards and decorations ==
- Iron Cross (1914)
  - 2nd class
  - 1st class
- Hanseatic Cross of Hamburg
- Military Merit Cross of Austria-Hungary, 3rd class with war decoration
- Wound Badge in black
- Honour Cross of the World War 1914/1918
- Iron Cross (1939)
  - 2nd class
  - 1st class
- German Cross in gold
- War Merit Cross, 1st and 2nd class
- Knight's Cross of the Iron Cross on 4 May 1944 as Generalmajor and commander of 208. Infanterie-Division
