= 208th Infantry Division (Wehrmacht) =

- 208. Infanterie-Division
- Division insignia
- Active: August 1939–May 1945
- Country: Nazi Germany
- Branch: Army
- Type: Infantry
- Size: Division
- Engagements: World War II: Kamenets-Podolsky pocket

The 208th Infantry Division, or 208.Infanterie-Division in German, was a large military unit that served during World War II. Like most German infantry divisions, the bulk of its troops were foot-mobile infantry supported by horse-drawn artillery.

The 208th Infantry Division was formed on 26 August 1939. it served in the invasion of Poland of 1939 as a reserve division of Army Group North and was commanded by General Moritz Andreas. During Fall Gelb it was a reserve division allocated to 18th Army and was mainly active in the occupation of northern Belgium. From January 1942 it fought continuously on the Eastern Front.

On 1 January 1945, the 208th Infantry Division (then part of Army Group Heinrici under Army Group A) had a strength of 9,840 men.

== Commanding officers ==
- Generalleutnant Moritz Andreas, (1 September 1939 – 13 December 1941)
- General der Infanterie Hans-Karl von Scheele, (13 December 1941 – 1 February 1943)
- Generalleutnant Karl-Wilhelm von Schlieben, (1 February 1943 – ? April 1943)
- Generalmajor Georg Zwade, (? April 1943 – 22 June 1943)
- Generalleutnant Heinz Piekenbrock, (22 June 1943 – 8 May 1945)

== Order of battle ==
=== 1939 ===
- Infantry Regiment 309
- Infantry Regiment 337
- Infantry Regiment 338
- Artillery Regiment 208
- Engineer Battalion 208
- Anti-Tank Detachment 208
- Reconnaissance Detachment 208
- Intelligence Department 208
- Supply Troops 208

=== 1943 ===
- Grenadier Regiment 309
- Grenadier Regiment 337
- Grenadier Regiment 338
- Fusilier Battalion 208
- Artillery Regiment 208
- Pioneer Battalion 208
- Panzerjäger Detachment 208
- Intelligence Department 208
- Supply Troops 208

== See also ==
- German order of battle for Operation Fall Weiss
- List of German Divisions in World War II
