= 73rd Infantry Division (Wehrmacht) =

- 73. Infanterie-Division
- Insignia of the 73rd Infantry Division
- Active: 26 August 1939 – 16 April 1945
- Country: Nazi Germany
- Branch: Army
- Type: Infantry
- Size: Division
- Nickname: Kleist Division
- Engagements: World War II

The German 73rd Infantry Division or in German 73. Infanterie-Division was a German military unit which served during World War II. The division consisted of more than 10,000 soldiers, primarily of the infantry branch, with supporting artillery. The division was only semi-motorized and relied on marching for the infantry units and horse-drawn transport for most of the support equipment, especially the artillery.

The 73rd Infantry Division was formed on 26 August 1939 as part of the 2nd wave (aufstellungswelle). Shortly after its formation it then participated in the invasion of Poland as a reserve division of Army Group North.

In 1941, it fought briefly in the Greek Campaign. It fought on the southern sector of the Eastern Front, from July 1941 through May 1944. As part of the 11th Army, it participated in the Crimean campaign in late 1941, including the initial assaults near Perekop and the "Tartar Ditch" as well as Sevastopol.

In the spring of 1944, it was cut off by the Soviet forces in the Crimea and destroyed in Sevastopol in May 1944. The division was reformed in Hungary on 16 June 1944. It participated in battles around Warsaw in the summer, at the end of July it was routed by the Red Army's 2nd Guards Tank Army commanded by Alexei Radzievsky, and in September 1944 was destroyed by Soviet forces during their assault on the Praga suburb of Warsaw. The division was subsequently reformed.

On 1 January 1945, the 73rd Infantry Division (then part of 9th Army under Army Group A) had a strength of 10,782 men.

The 73rd Infantry Division was destroyed in the fighting around Danzig in 1945. The surviving divisional staff officers went down with the liner Goya on 17 April 1945.

== Commanding officers ==
- General der Artillerie Friedrich von Rabenau (26 August 1939 – 29 September 1939)
- General der Infanterie Bruno Bieler (29 September 1939 – 29 October 1941)
- General der Infanterie Rudolf von Bünau (1 November 1941 – 1 February 1943)
- Generalmajor Johannes Nedtwig (1 February 1943 – 7 September 1943)
- Generalleutnant Hermann Böhme (7 September 1943 – 13 May 1944)
- Generalleutnant Dr. Friedrich Franek (26 June 1944 – 29 July 1944)
- Generalmajor Kurt Hähling (30 July 1944 – 7 September 1944)
- Generalmajor Franz Schlieper (7 September 1944 – 10 April 1945)

== Order of battle ==
Structure of the division:

- Headquarters
- 170th Infantry Regiment
- 186th Infantry Regiment
- 213th Infantry Regiment
- 173rd Reconnaissance Battalion (later bicycle battalion)
- 173rd Artillery Regiment
- 173rd Engineer Battalion
- 173rd Tank Destroyer Battalion
- 173rd Signal Battalion
- 173rd Divisional Supply Group

== Sources ==
- Tessin, Georg (1972). "Die Landstreitkräfte 71—130". Verbände und Truppen der deutschen Wehrmacht und Waffen SS im Zweiten Weltkrieg 1939—1945 (in German). Vol. 6. Frankfurt/Main: E.S. Mittler. pp. 14–16.
