= Lötzen Infantry Brigade =

Former brigade in Eastern Prussia

"Lötzen" Infantry Brigade
- Active: August 1939 - November 1939
- Country: Germany
- Allegiance: Nazi Germany (Germany); German High Command (Germany)
- Branch: Army
- Type: Infantry
- Size: Brigade
- Part of: Gruppe Brand
- Engagements: Invasion of Poland

Commanders
- Notable commanders: Otto-Ernst Ottenbacher

"Lötzen" Infantry Brigade was an army formation in Nazi Germany, created on 16 August 1939 on the basis of existing Landwehr regiment in eastern East Prussia in order to add flank protection for the 3rd Army in its invasion into Poland. The brigade was made up of two Landwehr regiments (each consisting of 3 battalions) and one Landwehr engineer battalion. The brigade included three infantry regiments and an artillery regiment, formed in the Landwehr mode (reservists aged 35–45), a battalion of sappers and reconnaissance and communications departments. In November 1939, the brigade was reformed in Giżycko and merged into the 311th Infantry Division commanded by General Paul Goeldner.

== Structure ==
- Landwehr-Infanterie-Regiment 161
- Landwehr-Infanterie-Regiment 162
- Landwehr-Artillerie-Regiment 161
- Landwehr-Pionier-Bataillon 161
- Landwehr-Aufklärungs-Schwadron 161
- Landwehr-Versorgungs-Einheiten 161
- Grenzwacht-Regiment
