= XXI Army Corps (Wehrmacht) =

Military unit of the Wehrmacht

- XXI. Armeekorps
- Active: 1940–1941
- Country: Nazi Germany
- Branch: Heer (Wehrmacht)
- Size: Corps
- Engagements: Operation Weserübung

Commanders
- Notable commanders: Nikolaus von Falkenhorst

The XXI Army Corps, also at times designated Group Falkenhorst and Group XXI, was a corps of the German Heer during World War II. It was first deployed on 10 August 1939 in Wehrkreis I in East Prussia. It participated in Operation Weserübung in early 1940. Later that year, it became Armeegruppe XXI ('Army Group 21'). In 1941, the XXI Army Corps was restructured to an army-level unit, Armee Norwegen. In 1943, another corps-level unit carrying the ordinal number 21 was created, the XXI Mountain Corps.

== Operational history ==
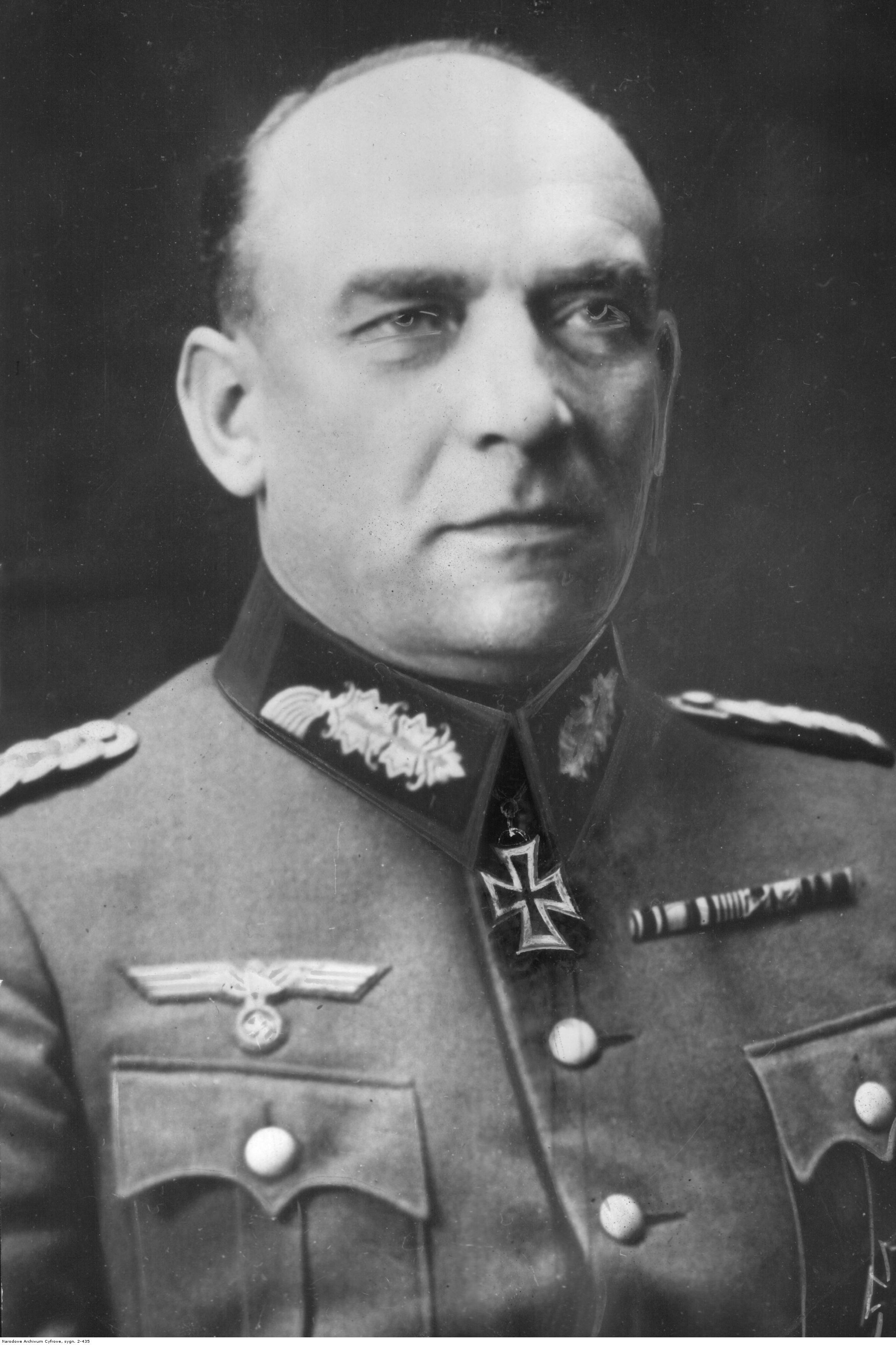
Nikolaus von Falkenhorst, commander of XXI Army Corps

=== 1939 ===
The Generalkommando XXI. Armeekorps was first deployed on 10 August 1939 in the Allenstein sub-district within Military District (Wehrkreis) I in East Prussia.

On 26 August, Nikolaus von Falkenhorst was appointed the unit's commander. For the Invasion of Poland that started on 1 September 1939, XXI Army Corps was part of 3rd Army (Georg von Küchler) within Army Group North (Fedor von Bock). The unit's subordinate divisions were the 21st (Kuno-Hans von Both) and 228th (Hans Suttner) Infantry Divisions.

At the beginning of the campaign, XXI Army Corps advanced from a position southwest of Osterode in East Prussia in a southwesterly direction towards Grudziądz and Chełmo, with the goal of closing the Danzig Corridor and to unite with the 4th Army's forces advancing into Poland from Pomerania. The Battle of Grudziądz was fought between the XXI's two infantry divisions and the Polish 4th and 16th Infantry Divisions, ending in German victory and the city's capture by 4 September 1939. The XXI Army Corps had to overcome severe Polish counterattacks on 2 September. The XXI Army Corps was supported in its advances on the Polish 16th Infantry Division in Grudziądz, which was protected on its right by the Polish 4th, by heavy Luftwaffe aerial attacks against 4th Infantry Divisions, taking pressure off the left flank of XXI Army Corps. Although the corps inflicted heavy losses on the Polish formations, the 4th and 16th Infantry Divisions withdrew from the area in good order, surrendering the city to the Wehrmacht.

With Grudziądz in German hands, German engineer units were tasked with the repairs of various damaged or destroyed bridges across the Vistula to finalize the connection between the 3rd and 4th Armies. While this task was going on, the combat units of XXI Army Corps, now designated Gruppe Falkenhorst ('Group Falkenhorst', named after the unit's commander Nikolaus von Falkenhorst), were transferred eastwards via East Prussia. Group Falkenhorst was strengthened by the addition of 10th Panzer Division, which had spent the first days of the invasion in Army Group North's reserves, as well as several fortress units from East Prussia, but was weakened by the removal of 228th Infantry Division. The unit concentrated its forces in the area of the Pisa river, and moved south towards Łomża on 7 September 1939. The subsequent Battle of Łomża saw 21st Infantry Division capture the town after a lengthy delay action by forces of the Polish 33rd Infantry Regiment.

In the meantime, the XIX Army Corps (Heinz Guderian) had transferred from Pomerania over East Prussia to the sector and was subsequently, to the detriment of the fighting strength of Group Falkenhorst, assigned control of the 10th Panzer Division and the East Prussian fortress units. Having lost its armored strikeforce to XIX Army Corps, Group Falkenhorst was now redesignated XXI Army Corps. Guderian's XIX Army Corps now took the lead of the offensive movements in the sector, with XXI Army Corps advancing along Guderian's right flank. However, XXI Army Corps was seriously hindered in its mobility compared to XIX Army Corps with its higher degree of mobilization and soon fell behind Guderian's progress when faced with fortified units of the Polish 18th Infantry Division at Nowogród.

On 12 September, XXI was moved to defensive duty towards the Białystok area. In this function, it made contact with forces of the Red Army that entered Poland from the east with the Soviet invasion that started on 17 September.

=== 1940 ===
After the Poland campaign, 3rd Army was dissolved and its constituent units distributed to other units. XXI Army Corps briefly became part of the newly formed 16th Army. By March 1940, it was removed from 16th Army and directly put under the control of Wehrmacht High Command, eventually designated Armee-Gruppe XXI ('Army Group XXI'). Falkenhorst was tasked with the execution of Operation Weserübung, the invasions of Denmark and Norway, by the German dictator Adolf Hitler on 21 February 1940.

Preparations were complete on 2 April and the invasion began on 9 April. The forces included five infantry divisions, two mountain divisions, and six naval task forces of the Kriegsmarine to deliver the landing forces to the entry points at Narvik, Trondheim, Bergen, Kristiansand/Arendal, Oslo, and Egersund. Another infantry division was assigned over the course of the year 1940 after the invasion was successful.

=== After 1940 ===
In the beginning of 1941, XXI Army Corps, already effectively an army-level unit since its designation as Gruppe XXI, was fully replaced and had its organizational structure transferred to the newly formed Armee Norwegen. With the ordinal number 21 freed up for German army corps, a new corps with that number, XXI Mountain Corps, was created in 1943.
