= Horst Willner =

German U-Boat commander in World War II

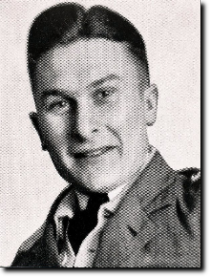
- Born: 13 October 1919; Klotzsche, Weimar Republic
- Died: 19 July 1999 (aged 79) Bremen, Germany
- Allegiance: Nazi Germany
- Branch: Kriegsmarine
- Service years: 1938-1945
- Rank: Oberleutnant zur See
- Commands: U-58; U-96; U-3505; U-3034
- Awards: Iron Cross 1st Class; Iron Cross 2nd Class

Horst Willner (13 October 1919 – 19 July 1999) was a German U-boat commander during the Second World War. Willner was a recipient of the Iron Cross 1st Class of Nazi Germany. He did not set out on patrols with his crews, but he did participate in the rescue of refugees from East Prussia ahead of the advancing Red Army. Post-war, Willner studied law and became President of the Bremen Chamber of Commerce.

== World War II ==
Willner served as a U-boat commander during the Second World War, joining the Kriegsmarine in 1938. He served with the Kriegsmarine until the end of the Second World War.

=== Operation Hannibal ===
Willner played a role in the evacuation of German refugees ahead of the advancing Red Army. On 28 March 1945 he set out on with his crew on U-3505 to rescue women and children, among them were his wife and 3-year-old daughter. The action of bringing his wife and daughter aboard was forbidden and was punishable by death if caught.
