= Friedrich von Rabenau =

German general (1884–1945)

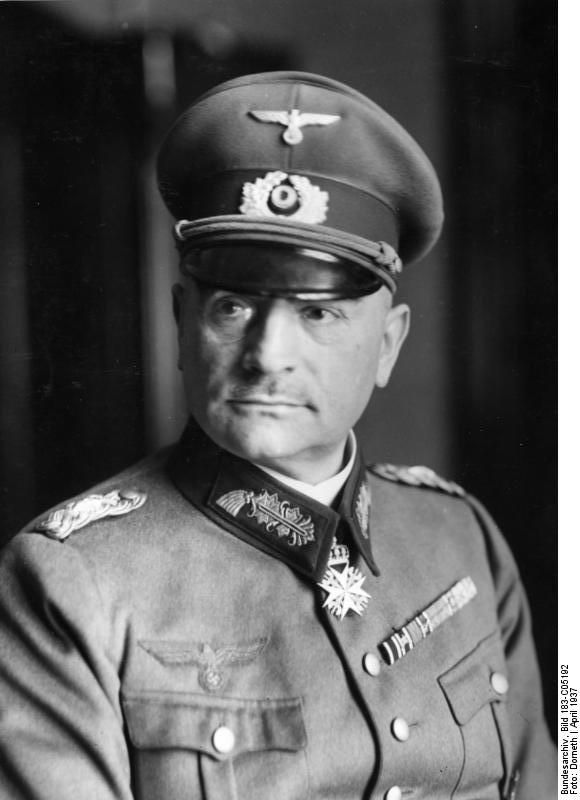
- Rabenau in 1937
- Born: 10 October 1884; Berlin, German Empire
- Died: 15 April 1945 (aged 60); Flossenbürg concentration camp
- Military career
- Allegiance: German Empire; Weimar Germany; Nazi Germany; German resistance to Nazism
- Branch: German Army
- Service years: 1903–1942
- Rank: General der Artillerie
- Conflicts: World War I; World War II

Friedrich von Rabenau (10 October 1884 – 15 April 1945) was a German career-soldier, general, theologian, and opponent of Nazism.

== Biography ==
Friedrich von Rabenau was born in Berlin to the physician Friedrich von Rabenau (1847–1885) and Wally, née Noebel. He joined the Prussian Army in 1903 as a member of the 72nd Field Artillery Regiment (stationed at Danzig), served in World War I, and remained in the Weimar-German Reichswehr. In 1936, von Rabenau was assigned by the then head of the general staff, Generaloberst Ludwig August Theodor Beck, to establish (from the Reichsarchiv) the first central archive of the German army, in Potsdam. Well suited to the task, Rabenau strove to prevent ideological falsifications with a scientific diligence in gathering sources that was second to none.

His Christian beliefs led him to join the opposition to Nazism early. Von Rabenau was a Rechtsritter (Knight of Justice) in the supradenominational Order of Saint John. As a Protestant Christian and a general, he successfully applied to then Reichsführer-SS Heinrich Himmler for permission to take over Maria Laach Abbey, which had been seized from Roman Catholic Cardinal Graf von Galen in Münster. Von Rabenau joined no resistance group, though he did act as a conduit between Generaloberst Ludwig Beck and Carl Friedrich Goerdeler, whom he knew from his time as an Abteilungskommandeur (Section Commander) in Königsberg (now Kaliningrad).

In mid-1942 von Rabenau was relieved of his office, transferred to the Führerreserve (a classification for high-ranking officers who were without billet which was often used by Adolf Hitler to push aside officers with whom he was displeased) at his current rank of General der Artillerie (General of the Artillery), and thus sent into premature retirement. He studied Protestant theology at the University of Berlin and in 1943 was made Licentiatus theologiae, writing his dissertation on military chaplaincy.

Von Rabenau was arrested in the aftermath of the plot which culminated in the attempt on Hitler's life on 20 July 1944. On 15 April 1945, without having been charged or tried, General von Rabenau, one of the last inmates remaining in the Flossenbürg concentration camp, was shot on Himmler's specific orders. The execution order was issued by Gestapo Chief Heinrich Müller with additional orders to report his death as resulting from a low-flying allied air attack. The Flossenburg Memorial erroneously gives von Rabenau's date of judicial murder as 9 April 1945. He was survived by his wife Eva Kautz and their two daughters.

== Awards and decorations ==
- Knight of Justice of the Order of St John
- Iron Cross of 1914, 1st and 2nd class
- Knight's Cross of the Royal House Order of Hohenzollern with Swords
- Friedrich Cross
- Military Merit Cross, 3rd class with War Decoration (Austria-Hungary)

== Works ==
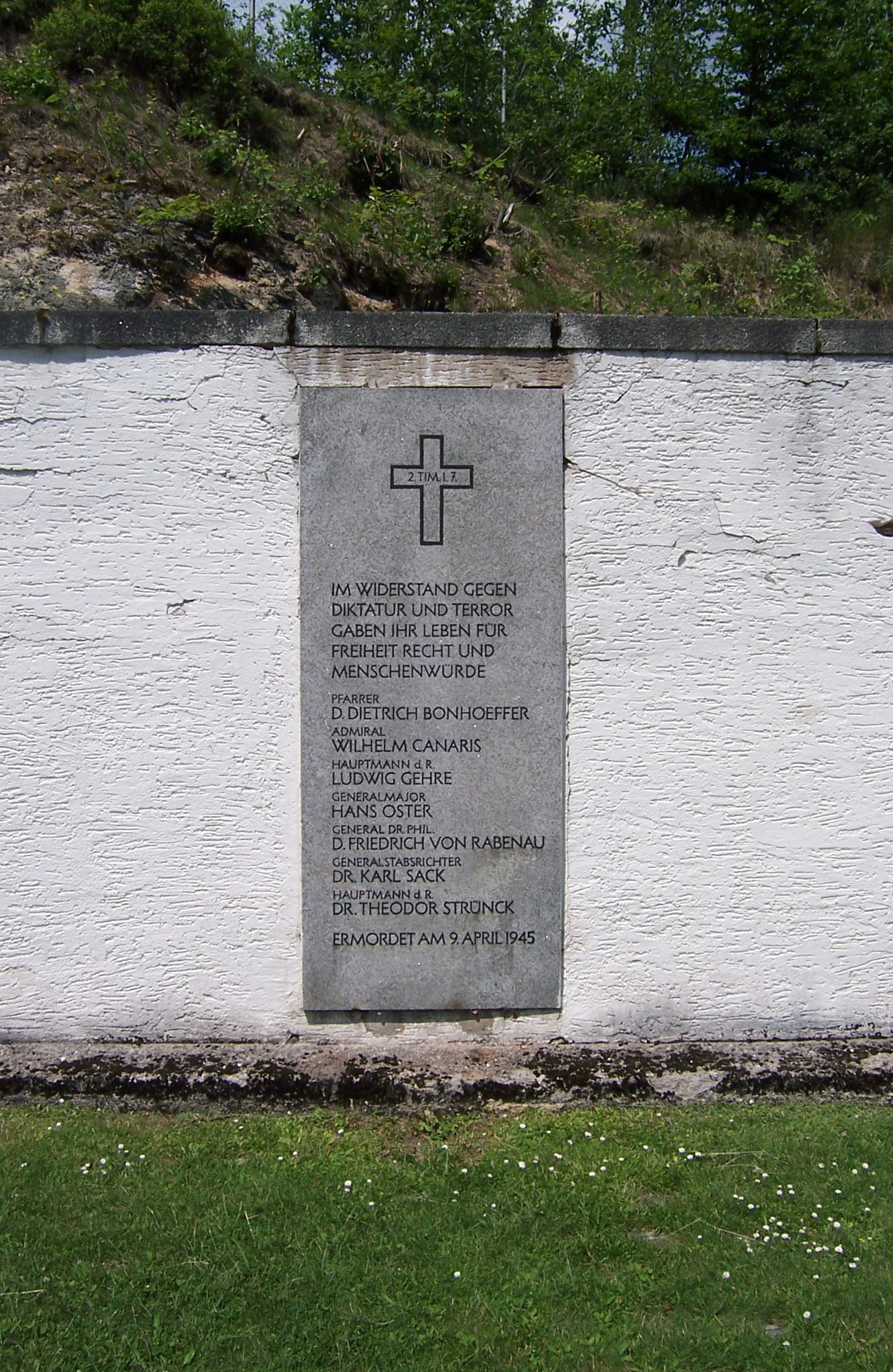
Flossenburg concentration camp, Arrestblock-Hof: Memorial to members of German resistance executed on 9 April 1945

- Die alte Armee und die junge Generation; Berlin: Mittler, 1925.
- Operative Entschlüsse gegen einen an Zahl überlegenen Gegner; Berlin: Mittler, 1935.
- Seeckt; Leipzig: V. Hase & Koehler, 1938.
- Scharnhorst nach 1808 - Seeckt nach 1918; Berlin: Landesgeschichtl. Vereinigg. f. d. Mark Brandenburg, 1939.
- Buch und Schwert; Leipzig: Oberbürgermeister, 1940.
- Von Geist und Seele des Soldaten; Berlin: Eher, 1940.
- Geistige und seelische Probleme im jetzigen Krieg; Berlin: Eher, 1940.
- Vom Sinn des Soldatentums; Köln: Du Mont Schauberg, 1941.
  - Hans von Seeckt. Aus seinem Leben 1866-1917.
  - Hans von Seeckt. Aus seinem Leben 1918-1936.

From Liste der auszusondernden Literatur (Berlin: Zentralverlag, 1946), Deutsche Verwaltung für Volksbildung in der sowjetischen Besatzungszone

== Sources ==
- Mühleisen, Horst: „Friedrich von Rabenau : Soldat, Archivar und Gelehrter; zu seinem fünfzigsten Todestag.“ In: Archivalische Zeitschrift 79 (1996) 127 - 140.
- Ramm, Hans-Joachim: Mich trägt mein Glaube. Friedrich von Rabenau. General und Christ im Widerstand. Tagebuch einer Gestapohaft, Saarbrücken 2011

Military offices
Preceded by —	Commander of 73. Infanterie-Division; 26 August 1939 – 29 September 1939	Succeeded by General der Infanterie Bruno Bieler
