= Nikolaus von Falkenhorst =

German general (1885–1968)

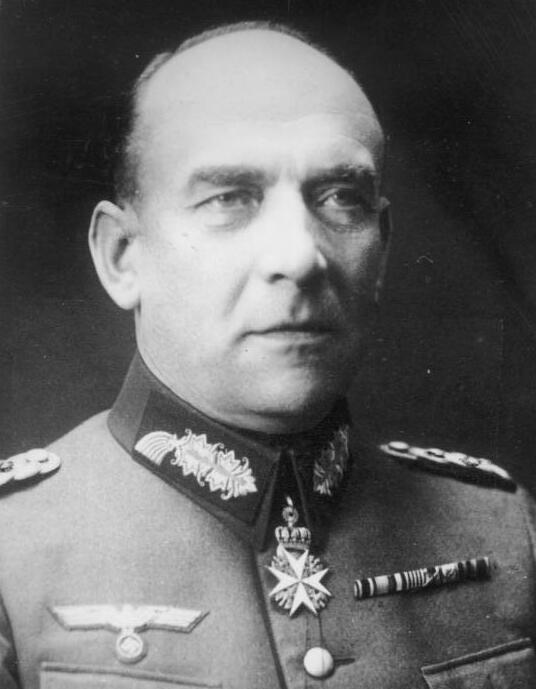
- 1940 portrait
- Born: Paul Nikolaus von Jastrzembski; 17 January 1885; Breslau, Silesia, Prussia, German Empire
- Died: 18 June 1968 (aged 83); Holzminden, Lower Saxony, West Germany
- Relatives: Erich Dethleffsen (son-in-law)
- Military career
- Allegiance: German Empire; Weimar Republic; Nazi Germany
- Branch: German Army
- Service years: 1903–1944
- Rank: Generaloberst
- Commands: Army Norway (Wehrmacht)
- Conflicts: World War I; World War II; Invasion of Poland; Norwegian campaign; Continuation War; Operation Silver Fox
- Awards: Knight's Cross of the Iron Cross

Paul Nikolaus von Falkenhorst (17 January 1885 – 18 June 1968) was a German general and war criminal during World War II. He planned and commanded the German invasion of Denmark and Norway in 1940, and was commander of German troops during the occupation of Norway from 1940 to 1944.

After the war, Falkenhorst was tried by a joint British-Norwegian military tribunal for war crimes. He was convicted and sentenced to death in 1946. The sentence was later commuted to twenty years' imprisonment. Falkenhorst was released in 1953 and died in 1968.

== Career ==
Falkenhorst was born in Breslau (now Wrocław, Poland). He joined the army in 1903 and served in World War I in regimental and staff roles, including a stint in Finland. In 1919, after the end of the war, he joined the paramilitary group Freikorps, and later the Reichswehr. On 1 July 1935, he was appointed Chief of Staff of the 3rd Army. In 1939, he commanded the XXI Army Corps during the Invasion of Poland.

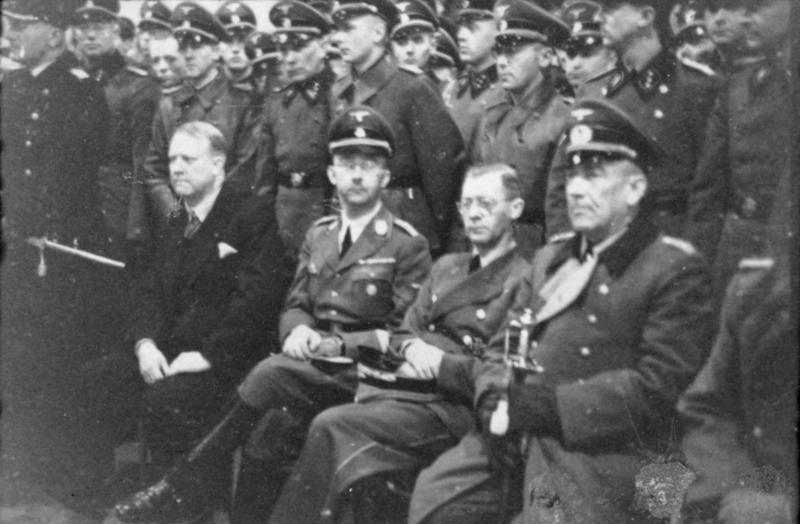
Vidkun Quisling, Head of the SS Heinrich Himmler, Reichskommissar Josef Terboven, and Falkenhorst in Norway, 1941

On 20 February 1940, Hitler informed Falkenhorst that he would be ground commander for the invasion of Norway Operation Weserübung, and gave him until 5 p.m. the same day to come up with a basic plan. With no time to consult military charts or maps, Falkenhorst picked up a Baedeker tourist guidebook of Norway at a stationery store on his way to his hotel room, where he planned the operation from maps he found in it. Hitler approved his plan.

The invasion was a success, aside from heavy losses inflicted upon the Kriegsmarine (navy). Allied forces tried to counter the German move, but Falkenhorst's troops drove them out of the country. For his part in the success, he was promoted to Generaloberst (Colonel General).

Between December 1940 and December 1944, von Falkenhorst remained commander of all German forces in Norway (Wehrmachtbefehlshaber Norwegen).

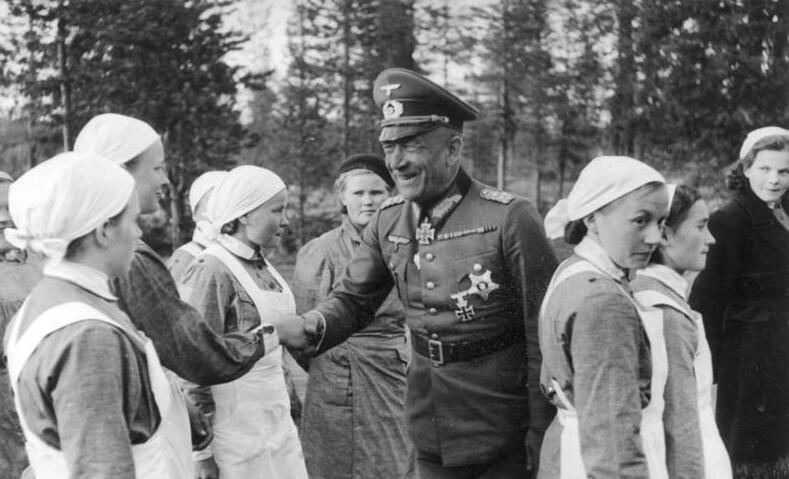
Von Falkenhorst with the sisters of the Lotta Svärd, a Finnish voluntary auxiliary paramilitary organisation for women, in the summer of 1941 during the Continuation War

Falkenhorst was dismissed from his command on 18 December 1944 and transferred to the Führerreserve. He did not receive a further assignment.

== Trial and conviction ==
After the war, Falkenhorst was tried by a joint British-Norwegian military tribunal for violating the rules of war. He had passed on the Führerbefehl known as the "Commando Order" which required captured commandos to be shot. The evidence at trial included Falkenhorst's order that commandos, if kept alive for interrogation, should not "survive for more than twenty-four hours". He distributed the order in 1942, then reminded his subordinates about it in 1943, insisting that the captured commandos be handed over to the SD, the intelligence service of the SS, for execution. The defense argued that Falkenhorst was acting under superior orders. He was convicted and sentenced to death in 1946.

The sentence was commuted to 20 years in prison, after a successful appeal by Sven Hedin. Hedin said Falkenhorst deserved mercy since he had successfully lobbied Hitler to spare the lives of 10 Norwegian resistance members who had been condemned to death for sabotage. Falkenhorst was released from Werl Prison on 23 July 1953, due to health issues. In 1968, following a heart attack, he died at Holzminden, West Germany, where his family had settled after fleeing from Lower Silesia. He is buried in the Holzminden Cemetery.

== Awards ==
- Knight's Cross of the Iron Cross (30 April 1940)
- Grand Cross with Swords of the Order of the White Rose of Finland (12 September 1941)

Military offices
Preceded by None	Commander of 32. Infanterie-Division; 1 October 1936 – 19 July 1939	Succeeded by Generalleutnant Franz Böhme
Preceded by None	Commander of XXI Army Corps; 10 August 1939 – 1 March 1940	Succeeded by None
Preceded by None	Commander of Army Group XXI; 1 March 1940 - 19 December 1940	Succeeded by None
Preceded by None	Commander of Army of Norway; 19 December 1940 – 18 December 1944	Succeeded by absorbed by the 20th Mountain Army
