= 254th Infantry Division =

- 254. Infanterie-Division
- Active: 26 August 1939–8 May 1945
- Country: Nazi Germany
- Branch: Army
- Type: Infantry
- Size: Division
- Nickname: Jumping Horse
- Engagements: World War II: Siege of Leningrad; Demyansk Pocket

Commanders
- Notable commanders: Gerhard von Schwerin; Friedrich Köchling; Hellmuth Reymann

The 254th Infantry Division (German: 254. Infanterie-Division) was an infantry division of the German Heer during World War II.

== History ==
The 254th Infantry Division was created on 26 August 1939, the day of German mobilization, as part of the fourth Aufstellungswelle. It was raised in Detmold and Düsseldorf in Wehrkreis VI, using Replacement Battalions from Infantry Regiment 18 (Detmold), Infantry Regiment 37 (Lingen / Osnabrück), Infantry Regiment 58 (Herford), and Infantry Regiment 79 (Münster / Wahn). These various battalions from various regiments were formed into the Infantry Regiments 454, 474, and 484, which made up the initial structure of the 254th Infantry Division along with Artillery Regiment 254. The initial commander of the division was Fritz Koch, appointed on 26 August 1939.

On 1 February 1940, the 254th Infantry Division passed one infantry battalion and one artillery battery to the 292nd Infantry Division of the eighth Aufstellungswelle. On 9 June 1940, the motorized fourth detachment of Artillery Regiment 254 was replaced with a horse-drawn one. On 17 November 1940, the division passed a third of its strength to the 320th Infantry Division of the eleventh Aufstellungswelle. On 30 April 1940, Walter Behschnitt had replaced Koch as divisional commander.

During Operation Barbarossa, which started in June 1941, the 254th Infantry Division participated in the initial drive of Army Group North over Riga and Tallinn towards the Siege of Leningrad. The division was briefly commanded by Gerhard von Schwerin between 20 July 1941 and August 1941, before Behschnitt returned to command.

In February 1942, the 254th Infantry Division fought in the Demyansk Pocket. On 10 April 1942, Friedrich Köchling took command of the division. He was in turn briefly replaced by Hellmuth Reymann on 5 September 1942, before returning to his post on 19 November 1942.

In 1943, three of the division's battalions were dissolved and a Division Fusilier Battalion formed from the Reconnaissance Detachment. Alfred Thielmann assumed command of the division on 16 August 1943.

On 10 May 1944, Grenadier Regiment 474 was dissolved, along with the third detachment of Artillery Regiment 254. Additionally, the 254th Infantry Division was strengthened by the Division Group 82, the remnants of the 82nd Infantry Division. On 4 July 1944, Division Group 82 was renamed Grenadier Regiment 474, thus reassembling the regiment that had been dissolved on 10 May.

On 31 December 1944, Richard Schmidt took command of the division from Thielmann. Schmidt would hold the command post until the end of the war. On 1 January 1945, the 254th Infantry Division (then under Army Group Heinrici of Army Group A) had a strength of 9,109 men.

In April 1945, Grenadier Regiment 474 was dissolved and replaced by the Grenadier Fahnenjunker Regiment 1238.

The 254th Infantry Division was trapped in the Deutsch-Brod pocket and subsequently taken prisoner by Soviet forces on 8 May 1945.

== Superior formations ==
Organizational chart of the 254th Infantry Division
Year	Month	Army Corps	Army	Army Group	Area
1939	September	Assembly	5th Army	Army Group C	Eifel
1939	October	XXII	4th Army	Army Group B	Lower Rhine
1939	December	XXII	6th Army	Army Group B	Lower Rhine
1940	January	XXII	6th Army	Army Group B	Lower Rhine
1940	May	XXVI	18th Army	Army Group B	Lower Rhine
1940	June	Army reserves	18th Army	None	Dunkirk
1940	July	VII	16th Army	Army Group A	Lille
1940	August	XXIII	16th Army	Army Group A	Lille
1940	September – December	XXXVIII	9th Army	Army Group A	Rouen
1941	January – April	XXXVIII	9th Army	Army Group A	Rouen
1941	May	I	18th Army	Army Group C	East Prussia
1941	June	XXXVIII	18th Army	Army Group North	Lithuania
1941	July	Army reserves	18th Army	Army Group North	Riga
1941	August	XXVI	18th Army	Army Group North	Tallinn
1941	September	Army reserves	18th Army	Army Group North	Leningrad
1941	October	XXXIX	18th Army	Army Group North	Volkhov
1941	November	I	18th Army	Army Group North	Volkhov
1941	December	I	18th Army	Army Group North	Volkhov
1942	January – October	I	18th Army	Army Group North	Volkhov
1942	November – December	XXXVIII	18th Army	Army Group North	Volkhov
1943	January	XXXVIII	18th Army	Army Group North	Volkhov
1943	February	II	18th Army	Army Group North	Demyansk Pocket
1943	March	X	18th Army	Army Group North	Staraya Russa
1943	April – September	LIV	18th Army	Army Group North	Leningrad
1943	October – December	XXVI	18th Army	Army Group North	Leningrad
1944	January	XXVI	18th Army	Army Group North	Leningrad
1944	February – March	XXXXVI	1st Panzer Army	Army Group South	Vinnytsia
1944	April	Absent from Wehrmacht records (possibly refreshment)			
1944	May – June	LIX	1st Panzer Army	Army Group North Ukraine	Ternopil
1944	July	XXIV	1st Panzer Army	Army Group North Ukraine	Carpathian Mountains
1944	August – September	XI	1st Panzer Army	Army Group North Ukraine	Carpathian Mountains
1944	October	XI	1st Panzer Army	Army Group A	Carpathian Mountains
1944	November – December	XI	1st Panzer Army	Army Group A	Kaschau
1945	January	XI	1st Panzer Army	Army Group A	Kaschau
1945	February	XVII	17th Army	Army Group Center	Silesia
1945	March	VIII	17th Army	Army Group Center	Silesia
1945	April	XXIV	1st Panzer Army	Army Group Center	Upper Silesia
1945	May	LXXII	1st Panzer Army	Army Group Center	Deutsch-Brod, Moravia

== Noteworthy individuals ==
- Fritz Koch, commanding general of the 254th Infantry Division (26 August 1939 – 30 April 1940).
- Walter Behschnitt, commanding general of the 254th Infantry Division (30 April 1940 – 20 July 1941, August 1941 – 10 April 1942).
- Gerhard von Schwerin, commanding general of the 254th Infantry Division (20 July 1941 – August 1941).
- Friedrich Köchling, commanding general of the 254th Infantry Division (10 April 1942 – 5 September 1942, 19 November 1942 – 16 August 1943).
- Hellmuth Reymann, commanding general of the 254th Infantry Division (5 September 1942 – 19 November 1942).
- Alfred Thielmann, commanding general of the 254th Infantry Division (16 August 1943 – 31 December 1944).
- Richard Schmidt, commanding general of the 254th Infantry Division (31 December 1944 – 8 May 1945).
