= 526th Infantry Division =

The 526th Infantry Division (German: 526. Infanterie-Division) was an infantry division of the Heer, the ground forces of the German Wehrmacht, during World War II. Assembled in October 1939, it subsequently became the Division No. 526 (German: Division Nr. 526), also referred to in some Wehrmacht sources as the "526th Reserve Division" (German: 526. Reserve-Division). It existed until early 1945.

== History ==
=== 526th Infantry Division ===
526th Infantry Division
- 526. Infanterie-Division
- Active: 15 October 1939 – 15 December 1941
- Country: Nazi Germany
- Branch: Army (Wehrmacht)
- Type: Infantry
- Size: Division

The 526th Infantry Division was formed in Cologne, in Wehrkreis VI, on 15 October 1939 through the reorganization of the Frontier Guard Sector Command 9 (German: Grenzwacht-Abschnitts-Kommando 9). The division initially consisted of Frontier Guard Regiment 6 and Frontier Guard Regiment 16, each with three battalions. The initial divisional commander was Hans von Sommerfeld, who served from October 1939 until October 1940.

Throughout 1939–40, the 526th Infantry Division variously served under 2nd Army (22 October 1939), Army Detachment N (28 October), Wehrkreis VI (4 November), X Army Corps (17 November), 18th Army (29 January 1940), Wehrkreis VI again (12 May) and the Generalquartiermeister of the German armed forces (24 May).

On 28 May 1940, the division was initially made available once again to Wehrkreis VI for the processing of prisoners of war captured during the Western Campaign but then rerouted to secure the Dutch-Belgian frontiers. Here, the division served on occupation duty, overseeing various smaller units in both Germany and in the occupied Low Countries. In October 1940, the 526th Infantry Division contained two Landesschützen Regiment staffs (33 (Cologne), 76 (Aachen)) and six Landesschützen Battalions (254, 308, 854, 871, 902, 909). The 526th Infantry Division was dissolved on 15 December 1941; the divisional staff became the divisional command of the 329th Infantry Division and the subordinate units were transferred to the command of Division z.b.V. 406 in Münster.

On 15 November 1940, von Sommerfeld was replaced as divisional commander by Günther von Hammerstein-Equord, who was in turn succeeded on 7 March 1941 by Fritz Kühne.

=== Division No. 526 ===
Division No. 526
- Division Nr. 526
- Active: 28 September 1942 – 1945
- Country: Nazi Germany
- Branch: Army (Wehrmacht)
- Type: Infantry
- Size: Division
- Nicknames: "Division Aachen" "526th Reserve Division"

The dissolution of the 526th Division was partially revoked five days later, on 20 December 1941, and the staff assembled as the "Division Staff Aachen". This newly assembled division staff became Division No. 526 on 28 September 1942 and charged with the control of replacement units in the western parts of Wehrkreis VI. This task had previously been fulfilled by Division No. 156 before it was reorganized into the 156th Reserve Division.

In this new function, the Division No. 526 consisted of the Infantry Replacement Regiment 211 (in Köln-Mülheim, with Battalions 39, 306, 317, 365), the Infantry Replacement Regiment 253 (in Aachen, with Battalions 328, 453, 464, 473), the Infantry Replacement Regiment 536 (in Düsseldorf, with Battalions 77, 78, 366, 412, 454, 474, 484), the Artillery Replacement Regiment 26 (in Aachen, with Detachments I./211 and 26), Pioneer Training Battalion 16 and Pioneer Replacement Battalion 253 (both at Westhoven), Anti-Aircraft Replacement Battalion 103 (at Wahn) and Vehicle Replacement Detachment 16 (at Krefeld) as well as Vehicle Training Detachment 253 (at Euskirchen). These replacement units served to train and prepare their personnel for frontline duty in various units, most usually those also attached to Wehrkreis VI, notably 253rd Infantry Division.

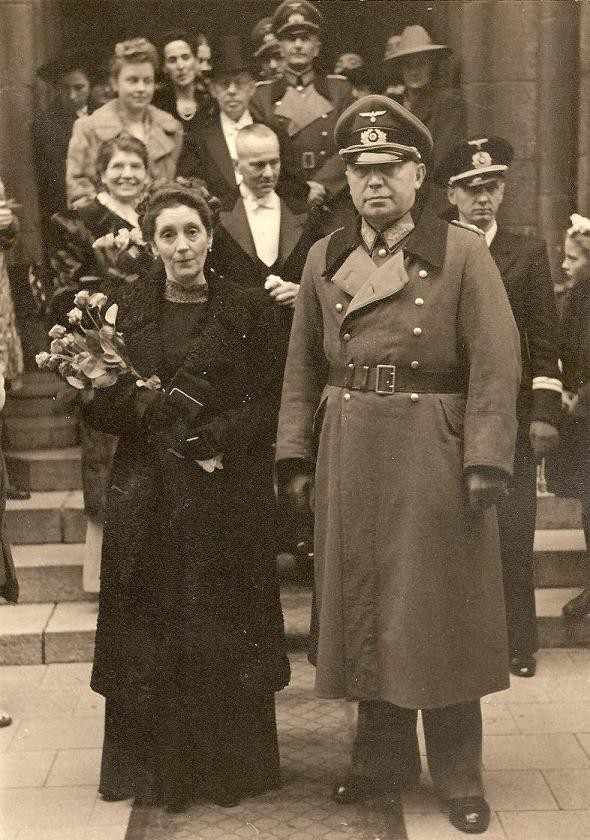
Kurt Schmidt, divisional commander of Division No. 526 between March and December 1944 (shown here on 10 April 1943).

In 1943, the Regiment 211 (now known as Grenadier Replacement and Training Regiment 211) was deployed to Guelders in the German-occupied Netherlands, with battalions at Goch, Venlo and Nijmegen. Likewise, the Anti-Aircraft Replacement Battalion 103 was sent to Elsenborn, and the Pioneer Training Replacement Battalion 16 to Hamm. On 15 March 1944, Kurt Schmidt became the division's commanding general.

After Operation Overlord in June 1944, the Western Allies drew increasingly closer to the German-occupied Netherlands; when British paratroopers landed in Arnhem (Operation Market Garden), Division No. 526 was called up as an emergency force to counteract the British landing. The Grenadier Replacement and Training Regiments 211, 253 and 536 were deployed with three, four and four battalions, respectively; Regiment 536 was additionally equipped with pioneers, a Panzerjäger formation, and anti-air troops. The divisional strength reached a maximum of 12,711 men. The division was attached to the LXXVI Corps in September 1944 and subsequently transferred to the reserve of 1st Parachute Army.

=== 526th Reserve Division ===
Starting in September 1944, the designation "526th Reserve Division" becomes frequently-used in the German military postal service for the unit (although the order of battle only ever speaks of the "Division No. 526", as it had done since September 1942). In the military postal records, this supposed 526th Reserve Division was listed with parts of both Division No. 526 and Division No. 176, featuring the Reserve Grenadier Regiment 253 (from Aachen, with Reserve Grenadier Battalions 328, 453, 473), the Reserve Grenadier Regiment 416 (from Osnabrück, with Reserve Grenadier Battalions 18, 37, 58; formerly part of Division No. 176) and the Reserve Grenadier Regiment 536 (from Düsseldorf, with Reserve Grenadier Battalions 77, 317, 412, 454), as well as the Reserve Artillery Detachment I./76 (from Wuppertal), the Reserve Pioneer Battalion 253 (from Westhoven), the Reserve Signals Company 526 and the Division Resupply Regiment 526.

This intended strength was evidently never fully reached; instead, the various aforementioned elements were, over the course of October 1944, scattered and inserted piecemeal into the 12th, 89th, 246th and 347th Infantry Divisions. The divisional staff was attached on 10 December 1944 to Army Group G by OB West.

The division's commander Kurt Schmidt was interrupted in his tenure of service by Hans Bergen between 12 December 1944 and 2 March 1945, when Schmidt returned to command for just one day before being succeeded (upon Schmidt's death on 3 March 1945) by Colonel of Reserves Neumann until the end of the war.

== Bibliography ==
=== Further reading ===
- Theis, Kerstin (2016). "Das Fallbeispiel: die Gerichte der Div. Nr. 156 und Nr. 526". Wehrmachtjustiz an der "Heimatfront" (in German). De Gruyter Oldenbourg. pp. 49–58. ISBN 9783110405583.
