= 329th Division =

329th Division may refer to:

- 329th Infantry Division, Wehrmacht, Germany
- 329th Rifle Division, Soviet Union

== See also ==
- List of military divisions by number
