= 131st Infantry Division (Wehrmacht) =

- 131. Infanterie-Division
- Active: October 1940 – February 1945
- Country: Nazi Germany
- Branch: Army
- Type: Infantry
- Size: Division
- Garrison/HQ: Hanover, Germany

The 131st Infantry Division (German: 131. Infanterie-Division) was a German Army infantry division in World War II.

== Operational history ==
The 131st Infantry Division was activated in October 1940, primarily out of other divisions - it included soldiers from the 31st and 269th Infantry Divisions, and cavalry from the 19th.

The division participated in Operation Barbarossa and fought during the entire war on the Eastern Front. In January 1945, the division was driven into the so-called Heiligenbeil Pocket, where it was destroyed in March 1945.

== Order of battle ==
- 431st Infantry Regiment
- 432nd Infantry Regiment
- 434th Infantry Regiment
- 131st Reconnaissance Battalion
- 131st Tank-destroyer Battalion
- 131st Engineer Battalion
- 131st Signal Battalion
- 131st Divisional-Resupply Troops

== Commanders ==
- Lieutenant General Heinrich Meyer-Buerdorf (Oct 1940-Jan 1944)
- Lieutenant General Friedrich Weber (Jan-Oct 1944)
- Major General of Reserves Werner Schulze (Oct 1944-Jan 1945)
- Colonel Nobiz (Jan-April 1945)
