= Otto Stapf =

Otto Stapf may refer to:

- Otto Stapf (botanist) (1857–1933), Austrian botanist and taxonomist
- Otto Stapf (officer) (1890–1963), German general
