= Danhauser =

Danhauser is a surname. Notable people with the surname include:

- Adolphe Danhauser (1835–1896), French musician, educator, music theorist and composer
- Josef Danhauser (1805–1845), Austrian painter
- Margaret Danhauser (1921–1987), American baseball player
- Paul Danhauser (1892–1975), German Wehrmacht general
