= Thomas-Emil von Wickede =

German general and Knight's Cross recipient (1893–1944)

- Born: 23 April 1893
- Died: 23 June 1944 (aged 51) near Rettenegg, Nazi Germany
- Military career
- Allegiance: German Empire; Weimar Republic; Nazi Germany
- Branch: German Army
- Service years: 1914–1944
- Rank: General der Infanterie
- Commands: 30th Infantry Division; X Army Corps
- Conflicts: World War I; World War II; Invasion of Poland; Battle of France; Operation Barbarossa; Siege of Leningrad; Demyansk Pocket
- Awards: Knight's Cross of the Iron Cross

Thomas-Emil von Wickede (23 April 1893 – 23 June 1944) was a German general in the Wehrmacht of Nazi Germany during World War II who commanded the X Army Corps. He was a recipient of the Knight's Cross of the Iron Cross. Wickede was killed on 23 June 1944, when an aircraft carrying him and generals Karl Eglseer, Eduard Dietl and Franz Rossi crashed in the vicinity of the small village of Rettenegg, Styria.

== Awards ==
- Knight's Cross of the Iron Cross on 15 August 1940 as Oberstleutnant and commander of Infanterie-Regiment 4

Military offices
Preceded by General der Infanterie Kurt von Tippelskirch	Commander of 30. Infanterie-Division; 5 June 1942 – 29 October 1943	Succeeded by Generalmajor Gerhard Henke
Preceded by General der Artillerie Christian Hansen	Commander of X. Armeekorps; 4 November 1943 - 23 June 1944	Succeeded by General der Infanterie Friedrich Köchling
