= 329th Infantry Division =

- German: 329. Infanterie-Division
- Active: 17 December 1941 – 1945
- Country: Nazi Germany
- Branch: Heer (Wehrmacht)
- Type: Infantry
- Size: Division
- Nickname: Hammer-Division
- Engagements: World War II: Eastern Front

Commanders
- Commanders: Helmuth Castorf (19/12/1941); Bruno Hippler (7/3/1942); Johannes Mayer (23/3/1942); Paul Winter (9/8/1943); Johannes Mayer (Sept. 1943); Werner Schulze (18/7/1944); Konrad Menkel (20/10/1944); Werner Schulze (1/1/1945); Konrad Menkel (early 1945)

The 329th Infantry Division (German: 329. Infanterie-Division) was an infantry division of the German army during World War II. It existed between 1941 and 1945.

== Operational history ==
The 329th Infantry Division was formed on 17 December 1941 as a valkyrie division of the 17th wave of deployment. Initially assembled at Groß-Born in Wehrkreis II, its staff personnel was drawn from the staff of the 526th Infantry Division, which had been formed in October 1939 from frontier guard units. Its initial commander was Helmuth Castorf.

The division initially consisted of three infantry regiments (551, 552, 554), with Infantry Regiment 551 consisting of three battalions and the other two regiments of two battalions each, for a total of seven infantry battalions. Additionally, the division possessed the Artillery Regiment 329 with two detachments and the Division Units 329.

The division was deployed near Lyck and marched to the Eastern Front on foot. There, it began fighting in the Staraya Russa sector around March 1942. On 7 March 1942, Bruno Hippler took command of the division. Hippler was in turn replaced by Johannes Mayer on 23 March. The 1st Bn Inf Regt 551 had to be dissolved as a result of casualties on 8 May 1942; 3rd Bn was later redesignated 1st Bn.

Until 1943, the Artillery Regiment 329 was strengthened from two up to four detachments, and a Fusilier Battalion was formed on divisional level. As a result, the 329th Infantry Division now approximated a division following the Division neuer Art 44 archetype. Paul Winter briefly took command of the division on 9 August 1943, before Mayer returned to his post in September.

On 18 July 1944, Werner Schulze took command of the 329th Infantry Division. He was succeeded by Konrad Menkel on 20 October before returning to his post on 1 January 1945. Menkel again took command of the division later in early 1945, and served as the final divisional commander.

== Unit insignia ==
The unit symbol of the 329th Infantry Division showed a hammer, giving it the nickname hammer division, or hammer infantry division.

== Legacy ==
Former members of the division formed a tradition association after the war, publishing a divisional history in 1968.

A memorial to the division was erected in Münster at Lauheide cemetery. The memorial gained public attention in 2019, when a neonazi group used the memorial as a venue for one of their rallies.

== Notable individuals ==
- Helmuth Castorf: Commander of the 329th Infantry Division between 19 December 1941 and 7 March 1942.
- Bruno Hippler: Commander of the 329th Infantry Division between 7 March 1942 and 23 March 1942.
- Johannes Mayer: Commander of the 329th Infantry Division between 23 March 1942 and 9 August 1943 and again between September 1943 and 18 July 1944.
- Paul Winter: Commander of the 329th Infantry Division between 9 August 1943 and September 1943.
- Werner Schulze: Commander of the 329th Infantry Division between 18 July 1944 and 20 October 1944 and again between 1 January 1945 until somewhen later that year.
- Konrad Menkel: Commander of the 329th Infantry Division between 20 October 1944 and 1 January 1945 and again starting in early 1945.
