= Friedrich Koch (general) =

- Born: 15 January 1879; Odenkirchen
- Died: 3 November 1961 (aged 82); Bonn
- Military career
- Allegiance: Nazi Germany
- Branch: Army (Wehrmacht); Waffen SS
- Rank: General of the Infantry; Gruppenführer
- Commands: 254. Infanterie-Division; XXXIV. Armeekorps
- Conflicts: World War II
- Awards: Knight's Cross of the Iron Cross

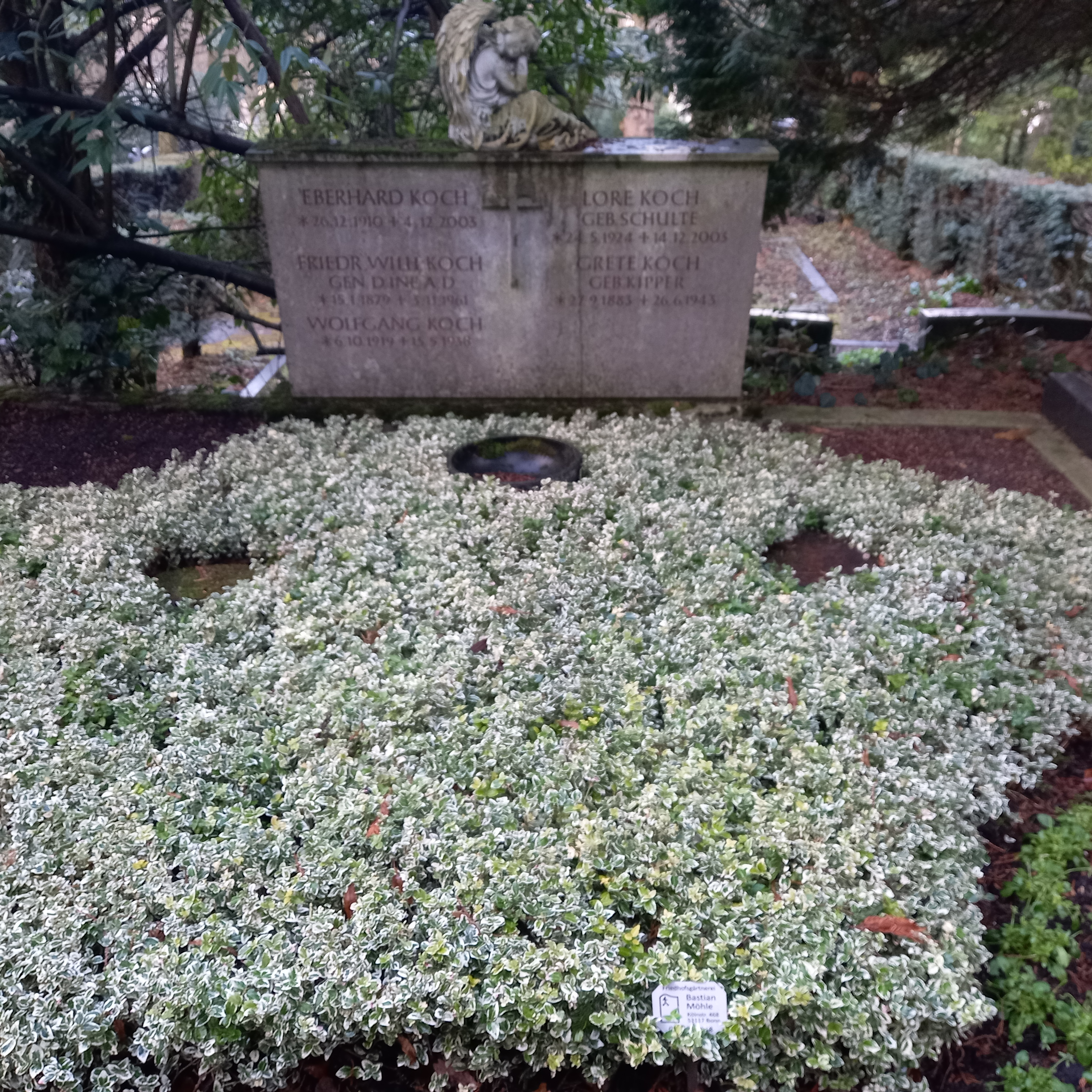
Tomb at Kessenicher Bergfriedhof, Bonn

Friedrich Wilhelm Koch (15 January 1879 – 3 November 1961) was a German general during World War II who commanded the XXXXIV corps. He was also a recipient of the Knight's Cross of the Iron Cross.

== Awards and decorations ==
- Knight's Cross of the Iron Cross on 13 October 1941 as General der Infanterie and commander of XXXXIV. Armeekorps

Military offices
Preceded by None	Commander of 254. Infanterie-Division; 26 August 1939 – 30 April 1940	Succeeded by Generalleutnant Walter Behschnitt
Preceded by None	Commander of the XXXXIV. Armeekorps; 1 May 1940 – 10 December 1941	Succeeded by General der Infanterie Otto Stapf
