= XXXXIV Army Corps (Wehrmacht) =

XXXXIV. Armeekorps
- Active: 15 April 1940 – 27 September 1944
- Country: Nazi Germany
- Branch: Army
- Size: Corps
- Engagements: World War II: Battle of France; Operation Barbarossa; Battle of Brody (1941); Battle of Uman; Battle of Kiev (1941); Barvenkovo–Lozovaya Offensive; Second Battle of Kharkov; Battle of the Caucasus; Battle of the Dnieper; Bereznegovatoye–Snigirevka Offensive; Odessa Offensive; Jassy–Kishinev Offensive

Commanders
- Notable commanders: Friedrich Koch; Maximilian de Angelis

German XXXXIV. Corps (XXXXIV. Armeekorps) was a corps in the German Army during World War II.

== History ==
The General Command XXXXIV. Armee Korps was established on 15 April 1940 in the Wehrkreis XVII (Vienna) and took part in the Battle of France in the section of the 6th Army. After the breakthrough over the Aisne, it advanced towards the Loire and occupied Orléans. In July 1940, the Corps was transferred to the General Government (Poland) and placed under the command of the 4th Army.

After the start of Operation Barbarossa (June 1941), again under the command of the 6th Army, the XXXXIV Army Corps, composed of the 9th, 262nd, 297th and 57th Infantry Divisions, operated on the Southern Bug, and took Sokal and Krystynopol. During the Battle of Brody (1941), the XXXXIV Corps was subjected to strong counter-attacks by the Soviet 15th Mechanized Corps. After withstanding the attack, the advance towards Koziatyn continued. In August 1941, during the Battle of Uman, the corps was subordinated to the 1st Panzer Army and advanced to the Dnieper after the battle. In September 1941, assigned to the 17th Army, the Corps, as part of Gruppe Schwedler, secured the Dnieper Section in the Cherkassy area during the Battle of Kiev with the 68th and 297th Infantry Divisions.

In January 1942, the Corps was pushed back in the Barvenkovo–Lozovaya Offensive by troops of the Southern Front (under Malinovsky) in the Izyum area. After the ensuing Second Battle of Kharkov, the Corps took part in the successful counter-offensive from 17 May, called "Operation Fridericus". During the German summer offensive, the Corps invaded the Caucasus from Sloviansk via the lower Don near Konstantinovsk in July 1942. After advancing towards Maikop, it tried in vain to break through to Tuapse on the Black Sea.

In the spring of 1943, the Corps was withdrawn to the Kuban Bridgehead. Pulled back to the Taman Peninsula in July 1943, the Corps was reassigned to the 6th Army on the Lower Dnieper and fought during October 1943 against the Soviet Lower Dnieper Offensive.

On March 13, 1944, the city of Cherson was lost to troops of the 4th Ukrainian Front after the Bereznegovatoye–Snigirevka Offensive. Pushed back to Moldavia, the Corps fought in the Jassy–Kishinev Offensive (August 1944), under command of Ludwig Müller. The corps was attacked by troops of the 3rd Ukrainian Front from Dubăsari, pushed back and surrounded at Chișinău and completely destroyed.

The Corps was officially dissolved on 27 September 1944 and never rebuilt.

== Commanders ==
- General der Infanterie Friedrich Koch, 1 May 1940 – 10 December 1941
- Generalleutnant Otto Stapf, 1 January 1942 – 26 January 1942
- General der Artillerie Maximilian de Angelis, 26 January 1942 - 30 November 1943
- General der Infanterie Friedrich Köchling, 30 November 1943 – 15 January 1944
- General der Artillerie Maximilian de Angelis, 15 January 1944 - 8 April 1944
- General der Infanterie Ludwig Müller, 8 April 1944 - August 1944 (POW and Corps destroyed)

== Area of operations ==
- France : May 1940 – July 1940
- Eastern Front, southern sector – June 1941 – August 1944 (Corps destroyed)

== See also ==
- List of German corps in World War II
