= Albrecht Wüstenhagen =

German general

- Born: 19 October 1892
- Died: 26 June 1944 (aged 51); Vitebsk, Soviet Union
- Military career
- Allegiance: Nazi Germany
- Branch: Army (Wehrmacht)
- Rank: Generalleutnant (Posthumously)
- Commands: 110th Infantry Division; 256th Infantry Division
- Conflicts: World War II: Invasion of Poland; Battle of France; Operation Barbarossa; Battle of Białystok–Minsk; Battle of Smolensk; Battles of Rzhev
- Awards: Knight's Cross of the Iron Cross

Albrecht Wüstenhagen (19 October 1892 – 26 June 1944) was a general in the Wehrmacht of Nazi Germany during World War II. He was a recipient of the Knight's Cross of the Iron Cross of Nazi Germany. Wüstenhagen was killed near Vitebsk, Belarus on 26 June 1944 while attempting to lead a breakout commanding the 256th Infantry Division which had recently been encircled during Operation Bagration.

== Awards and decorations ==
- Knight's Cross of the Iron Cross on 2 December 1942 as Oberst and commander of Artillerie-Regiment 129

Military offices
Preceded by Generalleutnant Eberhard von Kurowski	Commander of 110. Infanterie-Division; 25 September 1943 – 1 December 1943	Succeeded by Generalleutnant Eberhard von Kurowski
Preceded by Generalleutnant Paul Danhauser	Commander of 256. Infanterie-Division; 24 November 1943 – 26 June 1944	Succeeded by Reformed as 256. Volksgrenadier-Division
