= Friedrich Köchling =

German general and Knight's Cross recipient (1893–1970)

- Born: 22 June 1893
- Died: 6 June 1970 (aged 76)
- Military career
- Allegiance: German Empire; Weimar Republic; Nazi Germany
- Branch: Imperial German Army; Reichsheer; German Army
- Service years: 1912–1945
- Rank: General der Infanterie
- Commands: Sudetendeutsches Freikorps (de facto); 254 Infanterie-Division; XLIV. Armeekorps; XLIX. Gebirgskorps; X. Armeekorps; LXXXI. Armeekorps
- Conflicts: World War I; German-Czechoslovak War; World War II; Battle of France; Operation Barbarossa; Siege of Leningrad; Battle of the Caucasus; Battle of Aachen; Ruhr Pocket
- Awards: Knight's Cross of the Iron Cross

Friedrich Köchling (22 June 1893 – 6 June 1970) was a German general in the Wehrmacht of Nazi Germany during World War II who held commands at the division and corps levels. He was also a recipient of the Knight's Cross of the Iron Cross.

== Awards and decorations ==
- Knight's Cross of the Iron Cross on 31 July 1942 as Generalmajor and commander of 254. Infanterie-Division

Military offices
Preceded by Generalleutnant Walter Behschnitt	Commander of 254. Infanterie-Division; 22 March 1942 – 5 September 1942	Succeeded by Generalmajor Hellmuth Reymann
Preceded by Generalmajor Hellmuth Reymann	Commander of 254. Infanterie-Division; 19 November 1942 – 16 August 1943	Succeeded by Generalleutnant Alfred Thielmann
Preceded by General der Artillerie Maximilian de Angelis	Commander of XLIV. Armeekorps; 30 November 1943 – 15 January 1944	Succeeded by General der Artillerie Maximilian de Angelis
Preceded by General der Gebirgstruppe Rudolf Konrad	Commander of XLIX. Gebirgskorps; 15 February 1944 – 15 March 1944	Succeeded by General der Gebirgstruppe Rudolf Konrad
Preceded by General der Infanterie Thomas-Emil von Wickede	Commander of X. Armeekorps; 25 June 1944 – 3 September 1944	Succeeded by General der Infanterie Hermann Foertsch
Preceded by General der Infanterie Friedrich-August Schack	Commander of LXXXI. Armeekorps; 21 September 1944 – 10 March 1945	Succeeded by Generalleutnant Ernst-Günther Baade
