= Hermann Recknagel =

German general (1892–1945)

- Born: 18 July 1892
- Died: 23 January 1945 (aged 52); Piotrków Trybunalski, General Government
- Military career
- Allegiance: Nazi Germany
- Branch: Army (Wehrmacht)
- Rank: General of the Infantry
- Commands: 111. Infanterie-Division; XXXXII. Armeekorps
- Conflicts: Vistula-Oder Offensive †
- Awards: Knight's Cross of the Iron Cross with Oak Leaves and Swords

Hermann Recknagel (18 July 1892 – 23 January 1945) was a German general during World War II and recipient of the Knight's Cross of the Iron Cross with Oak Leaves and Swords of Nazi Germany. Recknagel was shot and killed by Polish partisans on 23 January 1945 in German-occupied Poland.

== Awards ==
- Iron Cross (1914) 2nd Class (1 October 1914) & 1st Class (30 September 1916)
- Clasp to the Iron Cross (1939) 2nd Class (22 September 1939) & 1st Class (2 October 1939)
- German Cross in Gold on 11 February 1943 as Generalmajor and commander of the 111. Infanterie-Division
- Knight's Cross of the Iron Cross with Oak Leaves and Swords
  - Knight's Cross on 5 August 1940 as Oberst and commander of Infanterie-Regiment 54
  - Oak Leaves on 6 November 1943 as Generalleutnant and commander of the 111. Infanterie-Division
  - Swords on 23 October 1944 as General der Infanterie and commanding general of the XXXXII. Armeekorps

Military offices
Preceded by General der Infanterie Otto Stapf	Commander of 111. Infanterie-Division; 1 January 1942 – 15 August 1943	Succeeded by Generalmajor Werner von Bülow
Preceded by Generalmajor Werner von Bülow	Commander of 111. Infanterie-Division; 30 August 1943 – 1 November 1943	Succeeded by Generalmajor Erich Gruner
Preceded by General der Infanterie Franz Mattenklott	Commander of XXXXII. Armeekorps; 14 June 1944 – 23 January 1945	Succeeded by Generalmajor Arthur Finger
