= Friedrich Weber (general) =

WWII German General in Africa and the Eastern Front

- Born: 31 March 1892; Château-Salins, Lorraine
- Died: 2 September 1972 (aged 80); Deggendorf, Bavaria
- Military career
- Allegiance: Kingdom of Bavaria; German Empire; Weimar Republic; Nazi Germany
- Branch: Bavarian Army; Imperial German Army; Freikorps; Army
- Rank: Generalleutnant
- Commands: Infanterie-Regiment 481; 256. Infanterie-Division; 334. Infanterie-Division; 298. Infanterie-Division; 131. Infanterie-Division; Festungs-Division Warsaw
- Conflicts: World War I: First Battle of Ypres; Second Battle of Artois; Battle of Verdun; Second Battle of the Aisne; Second Battle of the Marne; World War II: Battle of France; Battle of Dunkirk; Tunisian Campaign; Eastern Front; Vistula–Oder Offensive
- Awards: Knight's Cross of the Iron Cross; German Cross; Iron Cross; Eastern Medal

Friedrich Weber (March 31, 1892 – September 2, 1974) was a German general in World War II. He fought in Africa and in the Eastern Front. He was the commander of the fortress division defending Warsaw in January 1945.

== Early years ==
Weber was born on 31 March 1892 in Château-Salins, in Lorraine, then the Imperial Territory of Alsace-Lorraine. The Imperial German administration strongly discouraged the French language and culture in favor of High German, which became the administrative language (Geschäftssprache). It required the use of German in schools in areas which it considered or designated as German-speaking. French was allowed to remain in use only in primary and secondary schools in municipalities definitely considered Francophone, such as Château-Salins and the surrounding arrondissement, as well and in their local administration. The French name Château-Salins was changed to Salzburg shortly after 1871, which caused problems beyond the language conflict due to the risk of confusion with the better-known Salzburg, so that the French name form was reintroduced and was not affected by the wave of Germanization in 1915.

Weber attended high school in Metz, where his father was an imperial notary. After graduating from high school, he studied law at LMU Munich. On July 15, 1911, he joined the Transrhenania Munich Corps (Corps Transrhenania München), his father's corps. He switched to the Ruprecht-Karls-Universität Heidelberg, where he also studied economics.

== First World War ==
At the beginning of the First World War he joined the 2nd Foot Artillery Regiment (2. Fußartillerie-Regiment) of the Bavarian Army as a Fahnenjunker. As an officer he fought on the Western Front in the battles of Verdun and Reims, on the Aisne, near Artois and Ypres. At the end of the war he was Oberleutnant (first lieutenant) and had received both classes of the Iron Cross and the Military Merit Order IV class with swords for his services.

== Reichswehr ==
In 1919 Weber joined Freikorps Epp, commanded by Franz Ritter von Epp, and containing personalities such as Ernst Röhm, Rudolf Hess and the later "Hero of Narvik" Eduard Dietl. In the same year he was accepted into the Reichswehr and stationed in Ingolstadt and Nuremberg. Friedrich Weber married in 1924, and had four sons. In 1926 he came to Amberg for the training battalion of the 20th (Bavarian) Infantry Regiment (20. (Bayerischen) Infanterie-Regiment), where he was promoted to Hauptmann (captain) on April 1, 1928. In 1930 he became company commander of the 13. Minenwerfer-Kompanie in Regensburg, and in 1935 commander of the 3rd battalion of the 20th Infantry Regiment (Infanterie-Regiment 20) in Deggendorf.

When his corps was suspended during the Nazi era, he became a member of the old comradeship "von der Pfordten" founded on June 19, 1938.

== Second World War ==
Since the 1939's invasion of Poland an Oberstleutnant (lieutenant colonel) Weber was the commander of the 481th Infantry Regiment (Infanterie-Regiment 481), part of the 256th Infantry Division, which he led in the invasion of Western Europe, fighting in the Netherlands. On May 17, 1940, his regiment succeeded in penetrating the fortress area of Rotterdam. Weber also excelled in the battles for Nieuwpoort and Dunkirk and was awarded the Knight's Cross of the Iron Cross on June 8, 1940. On October 1, 1940, he was promoted to Oberst (colonel).

From January 4 to February 14, 1942, he served as the commander of the 256th Infantry Division in the Eastern Front. Temporarily in the Führerreserve, on 15 November 1942 he took over the 334th Infantry Division that was promptly sent to Tunisia. With his troops he stormed the Djebel Manson and was involved in the attack on Medjez el Bab and Beja at the head of Kampfgruppe Weber, later renamed Korpsgruppe Weber, comprising the 334th Infantry Division, elements of the Hermann Göring Division and the 10th Panzer Division, in Operation Oxhead (Unternehmen Ochsenkopf); the attack proceeding in three groups or horns, in the shape of a bull's head. The northern horn, with most of the tanks, was to advance on the route from Mateur from the north-east, to capture Béja 40 km (25 mi) west of Medjez. The second group was to attack from Goubellat towards Sloughia and Oued Zarga to envelop the British at Mejez El Bab and the third group was to carry out a pincer attack in the Bou Arouda valley, then advance through El Aroussa to Gafour, with the objective of the road junction at El Aroussa. Shortly before the Axis forces surrendered in April 1943, he was supposed to inform Hitler of the grievances in Africa but was turned away by Field Marshal Keitel and dismissed as commander.

On January 1, 1943, he was promoted to Generalmajor (major general). On 20 November 1943, Generalmajor Weber commanded the Silesian 298th Infantry Division in the Soviet Union. On January 10, 1944, he succeeded General of the Artillery Heinrich Meyer-Bürdorf until the end of October 1944 as commander of the 131st Infantry Division that was to hold a line at Vitebsk. On July 1, 1944, Weber was promoted to Generalleutenant (lieutenant general) and from December 20, 1944, appointed commander of the Festung Division "Warsaw", created on 12 January 1945.

=== Relief of Command ===
Contrary to a no longer executed Führer decree to keep the enclosed fortress, he led his men back to the German main battle line, taking all the wounded with them and after breaking through the front, which was already 60 kilometers away. For abandoning the Polish capital, Weber was relieved of command on January 25, 1945 and formally transferred to the Führerreserve. Taken to court martial, Weber was sentenced to three years imprisonment. The execution was suspended for probation at the front.

== Post-war years ==
From May 8, 1945, until June 26, 1947, Weber was a US prisoner of war. After his release, he pursued various activities. From 1949 he became involved in adult education. He participated in the founding of the Deggendorf Volkshochschul adult education center and took over its management in 1951. He was chairman of the Niederbayern district working group of adult education centers and a member of the main committee of the Bavarian Adult Education Association. In 1961 he founded the contemporary history education center at Schloss Egg (Zeitgeschichtliches Bildungszentrum Schloss Egg). For many years he was chairman of the Deggendorf student association (Waffenring).

Friedrich Weber died on 2 September 1972 in Deggendorf, in Bavaria, West Germany.

== Family ==
Weber had been married since 1924 and had four sons.

== Orders and awards ==
- Iron Cross, 2nd and 1st classes.
- The Honour Cross of the World War 1914/1918.
- Service Award Cross for 24 years of service.
- Anschluss Commemorative Medal 1938.
- Sudetenland Medal with Prague Castle clasp.
- Wound Badge in black and silver.
- Certificate of Appreciation from the Commander in Chief of the Army for excellence on the battlefield.
- Knight's Cross of the Iron Cross as Oberstleutnant and commander of Infanterie-Regiment 481 (8 June 1940).
- German Cross in gold (22 April 1942).
- Infantry Assault Badge.
- Eastern Medal.
- Medal of Military Valor in silver (Italian).
- Grand Officer's Cross of the Bey of Tunis.
- Africa Cuff Title.
- Federal Cross of Merit 1st Class (15 October 1959).
- Bavarian Order of Merit.
- Honor armband of the Transrhenania Corps.
- Golden Citizen Medal of the City of Deggendorf.

== Bibliography ==
- Mitcham, Samuel W., Jr. (2007). German Order of Battle. Volume One: 1st – 290th Infantry Divisions in WWII. PA; United States of America: Stackpole Books. pg. 183–305, ISBN 978-0-8117-3416-5.
- Mitcham, Samuel W., Jr. (2007). German Order of Battle. Volume Two: 291st – 999th Infantry Divisions, Named Infantry Divisions, and Special Divisions in WWII. PA; United States of America: Stackpole Books. pg. 41-235, ISBN 978-0-8117-3437-0.

Military offices
Preceded by Generalleutnant Gerhard Kauffmann	Commander of 256. Infanterie-Division; 4 January 1942 – 14 February 1942	Succeeded by Generalleutnant Paul Danhauser
Preceded by —	Commander of 334. Infanterie-Division; 15 November 1942 – 15 April 1943	Succeeded by Generalmajor Fritz Krause
Preceded by Generalleutnant Heinrich Meyer-Buerdorf	Commander of 131. Infanterie-Division; 10 January 1944 – 28 October 1944	Succeeded by Generalmajor Werner Schulze
