= 256th Infantry Division =

- 256. Infanterie-Division
- Division Insignia
- Active: 26 August 1939 - 26 June 1944; September 1944 - May 1945
- Country: Nazi Germany
- Branch: Army
- Type: Infantry
- Size: Division
- Engagements: World War II

Insignia
- Identification symbol

- Identification symbol

- Identification symbol

- Identification symbol

- Identification symbol

The 256th Infantry Division (256. Infanterie-Division) was a German infantry division in World War II. They formed in August 1939 as part of the 4. Welle (wave). The division was destroyed at Vitebsk in June 1944 during Operation Bagration. The remnants of the division formed Divisions-Gruppe 256 which was assigned to Korpsabteilung H.

Towards the end of the war, the division was redeployed as 256th Volksgrenadier Division.

== History ==
=== 256th Infantry Division ===
==== Germany ====
The division was raised in Wehrkreis IV (Dresden) on 26 August 1939. The division was shipped to Poland (Protektorat Böhmen-Mären) as an occupation force. The division remained there in that role until November 1939 after which it was transported to Lippstadt in order to commence training for the attack on France and the Low Countries in 1940.

==== The Netherlands & Belgium ====
Just before the attack on May 10, the division was moved to the town of Kleve on the Dutch border where it was attached to the XXVI Corps under General der Artillerie Albert Wodrig, which was itself part of Heeresgruppe B (Army Group) under General-Oberst Fedor von Bock. Attached with the 256th Infantry Division in the XXVI Corps were the 254th Division and the so-called SS-VT (SS Verfügungstruppe, later 2nd SS Panzer Division Das Reich.) On the morning of May 10, the 256th Division got the order to break through the Dutch border defense, take the bridge at Gennep and push through to the Peel/Raam defensive line at Mill.

Though making good progress in the beginning, it turned out that the bridge at Gennep was the only 'bigger' road bridge which was taken intact, making a speedy transportation of troops almost impossible. This led to the 256th Division coming to Mill in pieces after which heavy fighting ensued for almost 48 hours. General Fedor von Bock visited the broken defensive line around Mill on May 11.

The 256th continued to fight along the line 's-Hertogenbosch, Tilburg, south of Breda, Braschaat, Antwerp and then on to the Nieuwpoort/Dunkirk area where they sealed the salient around the last harbour used to evacuate retreating French and British forces.

At the beginning of the second phase of Fall Gelb, the division was ordered to stay in the Nieuwpoort/Dunkirk area and later to Brittany where it stayed as an occupation force until February 1941.

==== Eastern Front ====
After that, the division was transferred to East-Poland in order to prepare for battles on the Eastern Front, it was put on the frontline for Operation Barbarossa. The division then fought in the Army Group Center. The division was destroyed in Vitebsk during Operation Bagration in July 1944.

==== Netherlands 1944 ====
The remnants of the division formed Divisions-Gruppe 256 which was assigned to Korps-Abteilung H. By Nov 1944 Divisions-Gruppe 256 was stationed on the north side of the Maas River in Holland. Eventually, the 256th Group was integrated into Grenadier Regiment 280, which was part of the 95th Infantry Division.

=== 256th Volksgrenadier Division ===
In September 1944, another division using the ordinal number 256th, the 256th Volksgrenadier Division, was created at Königsbrück military base. This came about through the renaming of the 568th Volksgrenadier Division, which had been created a month earlier.
It fought in the Battle of the Scheldt and later in the Saar-Moselle Triangle between 1944 and 1945. The 256th Volksgrenadier Division surrendered to American forces in the Württemberg region in May 1945.

== Order of battle ==
- 456. Infantry Regiment
- 476. Infantry Regiment
- 481. Infantry Regiment
- 256. Artillery Regiment
- 256. Panzerjäger Battalion
- 256. Reconnaissance Battalion
- 256. Pioneer Battalion (mot)
- 256. Signals Battalion (mot)
- Supply Troops

== Commanders ==
- Generalleutnant Josef Folttmann - (1 September 1939 - 10 January 1940)
- Generalleutnant Gerhard Kauffmann - (10 January 1940 - 4 January 1942)
- Generalleutnant Friedrich Weber - (4 January 1942 - 14 February 1942)
- Generalleutnant Paul Danhauser - (14 February 1942 - 24 November 1943)
- Generalleutnant Albrecht Wüstenhagen - (24 November 1943 - 26 June 1944) (KIA) (1)

== Operations Officers (Ia) ==
- Hauptmann Otto Deyhle - (?-1940)
- Major Albrecht von Warburg - (June 1940 - November 1942)
- Oberstleutnant Adolf Hornig - (November 1942 - 10 December 1943)

== Area of operations ==
- Germany - (September 1939 - May 1940)
- Netherlands & Belgium - (May 1940 - February 1941)
- Eastern front, central sector - (February 1941 - July 1944)
- Netherlands - (Sept 1944 - April 1945)
