= 111th Infantry Division (Wehrmacht) =

- 111. Infanterie-Division
- Active: November 1940 – May 1944
- Country: Nazi Germany
- Branch: Army
- Type: Infantry
- Size: Division
- Engagements: World War II: Operation Barbarossa; Dubno; Uman; Case Blue; Caucasus 1942; Dnieper 1943; Crimea 1944

The 111th Infantry Division was a major unit of the German Wehrmacht. Formed in late 1940 in the further expansion of the German army it was committed to the campaign against Russia, and spent 3 years on the eastern front. The division was finally trapped in Crimea and destroyed in the spring of 1944.

== Combat history ==
In May 1941, the division moved to the German-occupied zone of Poland, ready for the launch of operation Barbarossa in June. After crossing the Bug river, the division advanced on Dubno, where it fought off Russian counter attacks by the xx Mechanised corps, 34th Tank division. As part of 6th Army the division continued to push the soviet 5th Army forces back towards Kiev and by the end of August the division had reached the Dnieper river north of the Ukrainian capital, and formed bridgehead with 113th and the 298th Infantry Divisions. On 1 September these forces attacked out of the bridgehead striking into the rear of the Russian XXX Front, as a part of the huge encirclement operation around Kiev. The division went on to trap and help with the destruction the Russian 37th Army. After the great battle, the Soviet resistance in the southern Russia lessened and the forces under Army Group South were able to push eastwards on a broad front.

After the capture of Rostov-on-Don, Kleist's Panzer Army was forced to retreat to the line of the Mius-Front, where at the end of December 1941 saw the division on the line of Nikitovka - Debalcevo. But in the middle of January 1942 the division had to stop a deep penetration by the enemy in area of Barvenkovo-Vine.

After a long period of rest, the division joined the summer offensive, advancing with the 17th Army to the Caucasus, passing through the Rostov-on-Don, Mozdok, Nalchik, and Ordzhonikidze. Due to the impending threat of envelopment after the Battle of Stalingrad Army Group A had to quickly return to the line of the Mius-Front, and Taganrog, where the division remained on the defensive until the end of July 1943. After the failure of the German summer offensive at Kursk, the German army was forced to retreat, the 111th gradually rolled back to the West, defending the approaches to Melitopol to the end of September 1943, then to Nikopol until February 1944. The division then was switched to the defence of the Crimea, where it was destroyed. The last remnants were evacuated by ship in May 1944, and the division was officially disbanded.

== Organisation ==
The 111th Infantry Division was formed on 6 November 1940 as part of the 12th Wave at Fallingbostel in Military District XI.

The 50th Infantry regiment was transferred to the division from 3rd Infantry division, which was in the process of converting to a motorised division, with only 2 infantry regiments. The regiment had already fought in France and Poland with the 3Rd Division.
The 70th Infantry Regiment similarly come from the 36th Infantry Division which was also converting to a motorised division.
The 117th Infantry Regiment was formed in November 1940 from Fortress Regiment D.

In 1941 it contained

- 50th Infantry Regiment
- 70th Infantry Regiment
- 117th Infantry Regiment
- 117th Artillery Regiment

== Commanders ==
- November 5, 1940 - December 31, 1942 - General Otto Stapf
- January 1, 1942 - August 14, 1943 - General Herman Reknagel
- August 15, 1943 - August 29, 1943 - Major General Werner von Bülow
- August 30, 1943 - October 31, 1943 - German infantry general Reknagel
- November 1, 1943 - February 9, 1944 - Major General Erich Gruner
- February 10, 1944 - April 22, 1944 - Major General Kurt Adam
