= War Merit Cross =

Nazi World War II decoration

War Merit Cross Kriegsverdienstkreuz (German)
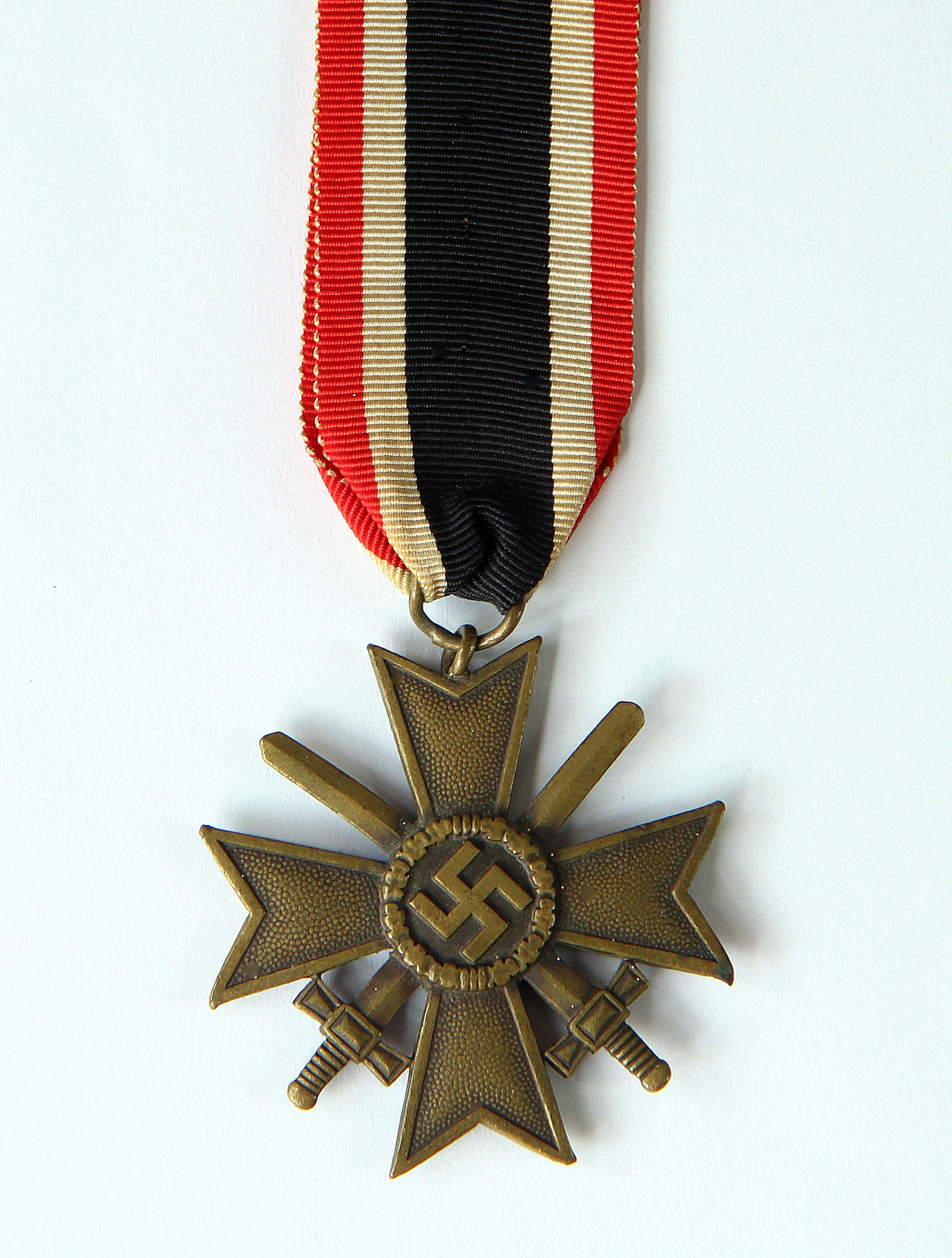
- Obverse of the War Merit Cross, 2nd Class
- Type: Medal, neck order
- Awarded for: Meritorious service
- Country: Germany
- Presented by: the Führer
- Eligibility: German military and civilian personnel
- Campaign: World War II
- Established: 1939
- Final award: 1945
- Ribbon bar

Precedence
- Next (higher): Iron Cross
- Related: War Merit Medal

The War Merit Cross (German: Kriegsverdienstkreuz) was a state decoration of Nazi Germany during World War II. By the end of the conflict it was issued in four degrees and had an equivalent civil award. A "de-Nazified" version of the War Merit Cross was reissued in 1957 by the Bundeswehr for its veterans.

== History ==
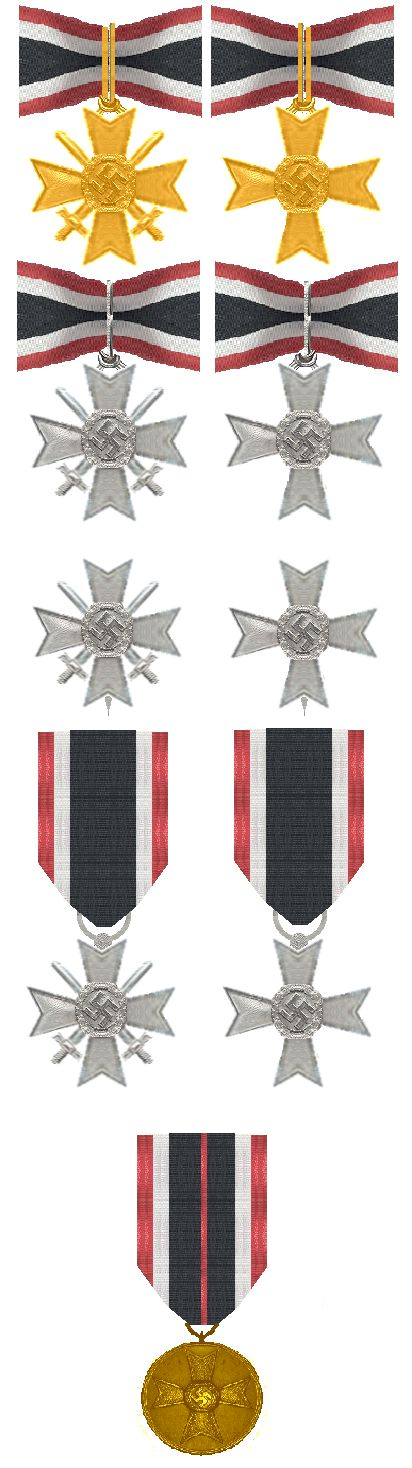
The German War Merit Cross (1939–45)

This award was created by Adolf Hitler in October 1939 as a successor to the non-combatant Iron Cross which was used in earlier wars (similar medal but with a different ribbon). The award would recognize bravery or service in the furtherance of the war effort that fell short of the award of the Iron Cross. The award was graded in the same manner as the Iron Cross: War Merit Cross Second Class, War Merit Cross First Class, and Knights Cross of the War Merit Cross. The award was authorized for both military personnel and for civilians. The award had two variants: with swords and without swords. Those with swords recognized bravery not directly connected to front-line activities, while awards without swords were for service in the furtherance of the war effort. Recipients had to have the lower grade of the award before getting the next level.

The wearing of Nazi era decorations was banned in Germany after the war, as was any display of the swastika. Veterans awarded the War Merit Cross were therefore unable to wear it, either in uniform or – publicly – on civilian dress. In 1957 the Federal Republic of Germany authorised alternative 'de-Nazified' replacement versions of World War II period war decorations. These could be worn both on Bundeswehr uniform and in civilian dress. The new version of the War Merit Cross replaced the swastika on the obverse central disc of the cross with the date "1939" (as on the reverse disc of the original version), the reverse disc being blank. The wearing of Nazi era decorations in any form continued to be banned in the German Democratic Republic until German reunification in 1990.

== Criteria ==
The ribbon of the War Merit Cross was in red-white-black-white-red; the red and black colors being reversed from the ribbon of the World War II version of the Iron Cross. The ribbon for the War Merit Medal was similar, but with a narrow vertical red strip in the center of the black field. Soldiers who earned the War Merit Cross 2nd Class with Swords wore a small crossed-swords device on the ribbon. The War Merit Cross 1st Class was a pin-backed medal worn on the pocket of the tunic (like the Iron Cross 1st Class). The ribbon of the War Merit Cross 2nd Class could be worn like the ribbon of the Iron Cross 2nd Class (through the second buttonhole). Nonetheless, combat soldiers tended to hold the War Merit Cross in low regard, referring to its wearers as being in 'Iron Cross Training'. The Knights Cross of the War Merit Cross was a neck order and worn the same way as the Knights Cross of the Iron Cross.

There was one extra grade of the War Merit Cross, which was created at the suggestion of Albert Speer: The Knights Cross of the War Merit Cross in Gold (German: Goldenes Ritterkreuz des Kriegsverdienstkreuzes). However, this was never officially placed on the list of national awards, as it came about in late 1944, and there was no time to officially promulgate the award before the war ended. The Knights Cross of the War Merit Cross in Gold (without swords) was awarded "on paper" to two recipients on 20 April 1945: Franz Hahne and Karl-Otto Saur.

The Knights Cross of the War Merit Cross was considered to be ranked higher than the German Cross in silver, but below the Knights Cross of the Iron Cross. A total of 118 awards of the Knights Cross of the War Merit Cross with swords, and 137 awards without swords were awarded. Considering the relative rarity of the award compared with the grades of the Knights Cross of the Iron Cross, it took on "extra meaning" it did not necessarily deserve, as it ranked below the Knights Cross of the Iron Cross. For example, Reichsmarschall Hermann Göring made a concerted effort to get Hitler to award him this order, much to Hitler's annoyance. In response, Hitler outlined a series of criteria governing the awarding of this decoration and the philosophy of such awards, and directed that "prominent party comrades" were not to be awarded with the Knights Cross of the War Merit Cross (or similar decorations), and withdrew the proposed awards of this order to Gauleiter Erich Koch and Herbert Backe. Directing his comments at Göring personally, Hitler ordered that such attempts to gain this award be stopped. Also, six persons received two Knights Crosses of the War Merit Cross (each one with and without Swords): Walter Brugmann, Julius Dorpmüller, Karl-Otto Saur, Albin Sawatzki, Walter Schreiber, and Walter Rohlandt.

Closely related to the War Merit Cross was the War Merit Medal (German: Kriegsverdienstmedaille), designated on 19 August 1940 for civilians to recognize outstanding service in the war effort. It was usually awarded to those workers in factories who significantly exceeded work quotas. The War Merit Medal was awarded to Germans and non-Germans, to men and women. An estimated 4.9 million medals were awarded by the end of the war in Europe.

== Notable recipients ==
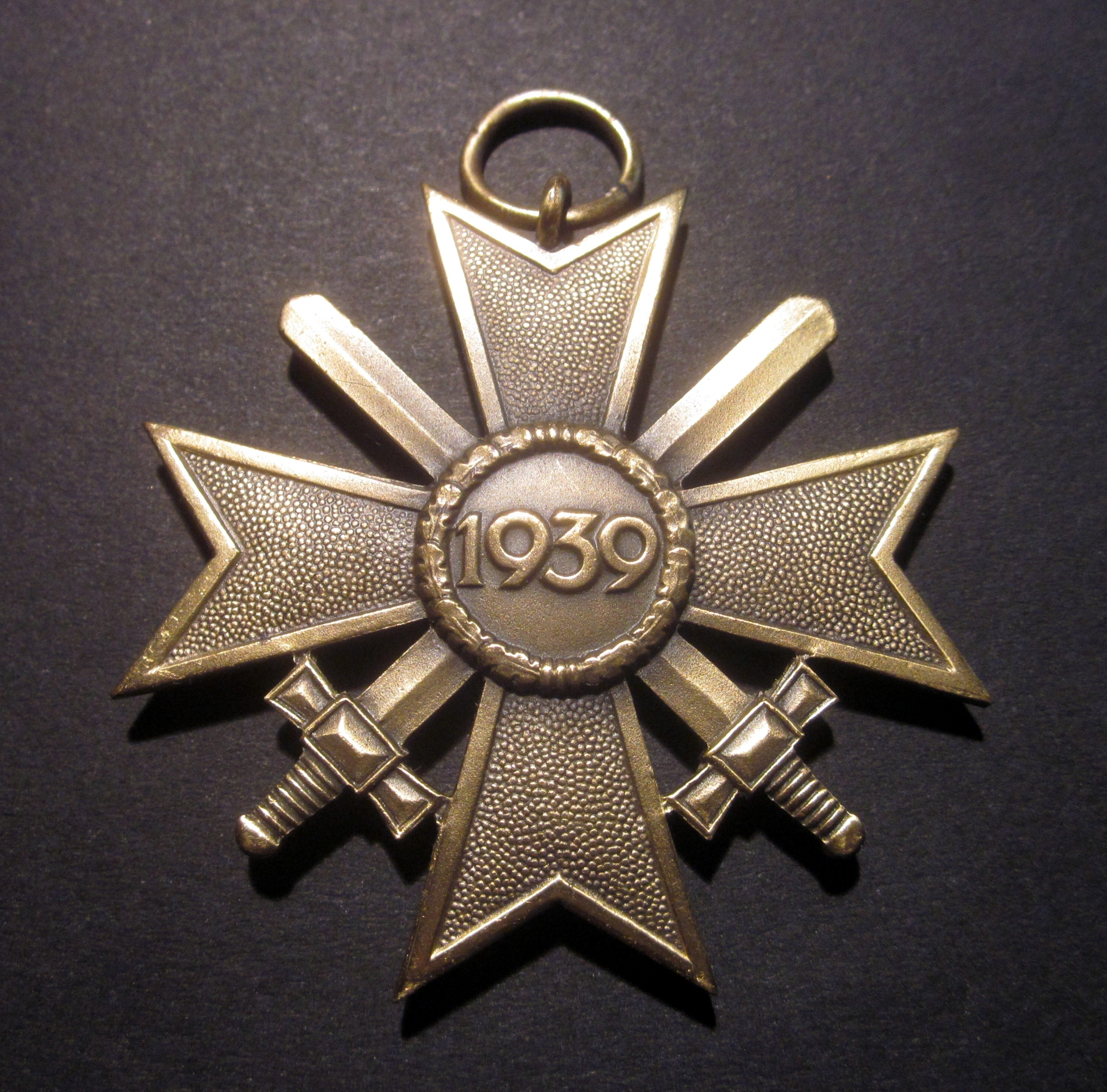
Denazified version of the medal, issued in 1957.

=== Knights Cross of the War Merit Cross ===
- Otto Ambros
- Max Bastian
- Gottlob Berger
- Heinrich Böhmcker (posthumous)
- Friedrich von Boetticher
- Wernher von Braun
- Walter Brugmann (2-time Knights Cross)
- Kurt Daluege
- Walter Dornberger
- Julius Dorpmüller (2-time Knights Cross)
- Franz Xaver Dorsch
- Franz Ritter von Epp
- Karl Hermann Frank
- Hans-Georg von Friedeburg
- Albert Ganzenmüller
- Karl Gebhardt
- Siegfried Handloser
- Hermann von Hanneken
- Edmund Glaise-Horstenau
- Franz Hayler
- Wolf-Heinrich Graf von Helldorff
- Hans Jüttner
- Ernst Kaltenbrunner
- Hans Kammler
- Carl Krauch
- Wilhelm Kube (posthumous)
- Emil Leeb
- Willy Messerschmitt
- Theo Morell
- Heinrich Müller
- Wilhelm Murr
- Jakob Nagel
- Hermann Neubacher
- Franz Neuhausen
- Wilhelm Ohnesorge
- Franz von Papen
- Paul Pleiger
- Oswald Pohl
- Ferdinand Porsche
- Fritz Reinhardt
- Georg Rickhey
- Gerhard Rose
- Karl-Otto Saur (2-time Knights Cross & Knights Cross in Gold)
- Ferdinand Sauerbruch
- Gerhard Schach
- Walter Schreiber (2-time Knights Cross)
- Otto Stapf
- Edmund Veesenmayer
- Walter Warlimont
- Walter Warzecha
- Otto Winkelmann

=== War Merit Cross ===
- Heinrich Bennecke (1st class)
- Alfred Ingemar Berndt (1st class)
- Josef Blösche (2nd class, with Swords)
- Franz Bock (1st class, with Swords)
- Karl Böhm (2nd class)
- Andreas Bolek (1st class, with Swords)
- Philipp Bouhler (1st class)
- Hermann Brauneck (2nd class)
- Friedrich Buchardt (1st class, with Swords)
- Günther Burstyn (1st class, with Swords)
- Hans Busch (2nd class)
- Adolf Butenandt (1st class)
- Karlfried Graf Dürckheim (2nd class)
- Karl von Eberstein (1st class, with Swords)
- Adolf Eichmann (1st class, with Swords)
- Alfred Frauenfeld (1st class, with Swords)
- Reinhard Gehlen (1st class, with Swords)
- Paul Giesler (1st class, with Swords)
- Ernst Girzick (2nd class)
- Ludwig Grauert (1st class, with Swords)
- Josef Grohé (1st class, with Swords)
- Eugen Hadamovsky (1st class)
- Karl Hanke (1st class)
- Arthur Hess (1st class)
- Adolf Heusinger (1st class, with Swords)
- Reinhard Heydrich (Posthumous: 1st class, with Swords)
- Friedrich Hildebrandt (1st class, with Swords)
- Richard Hildebrandt (1st class, with Swords)
- Albert Hoffmann (1st class, with Swords)
- Franz Josef Huber (1st class, with Swords)
- Friedrich Jeckeln (1st class, with Swords)
- Josias, Hereditary Prince of Waldeck and Pyrmont (2nd class, with Swords)
- William Joyce (1st class)
- Hartmann Lauterbacher (1st class, with Swords)
- Josef Mengele (2nd class, with Swords)
- Wilhelm Mohnke (2nd class, with Swords)
- Arthur Nebe (1st class, with Swords)
- Egon von Neindorff (1st class, with Swords)
- Hans Pfundtner (1st class)
- Philipp, Landgrave of Hesse (1st class)
- Hans-Adolf Prutzmann (1st class, with Swords)
- Wilhelm Reinhard (1st class)
- Gustav Adolf Scheel (1st class, with Swords)
- Walter Schellenberg (1st class, with Swords)
- Kurt Schmidt (1st class, with Swords)
- Karl Eberhard Schöngarth (1st class, with Swords)
- Franz Xaver Schwarz (1st class, with Swords)
- Hermann Senkowsky (1st class)
- Josef Spacil (1st class, with Swords)
- Rudolf Toussaint (1st class, with Swords)
- Siegfried Uiberreither (1st class)
- Udo von Woyrsch (1st class, with Swords)
- Paul Zimmermann (1st class, with Swords)
