= Eberhard von Kurowski =

German general (Generalleutnant) during World War II

- Born: 10 September 1895; Stettin
- Died: 11 September 1957 (aged 62); Stanzach
- Military career
- Allegiance: German Empire (to 1918); Weimar Republic (to 1933); Nazi Germany
- Branch: Army
- Service years: 1914–1945
- Rank: Generalleutnant
- Commands: 110. Infanterie-Division
- Conflicts: World War I World War II: Soviet Vitebsk–Orsha Offensive (surrendered)
- Awards: Knight's Cross of the Iron Cross

Eberhard von Kurowski (10 September 1895 – 11 September 1957) was a German general (Generalleutnant) in the Wehrmacht during World War II. He was a recipient of the Knight's Cross of the Iron Cross.

Kurowski surrendered to the Red Army in the course of the Soviet 1944 Vitebsk–Orsha Offensive. Convicted as a war criminal in the Soviet Union, he was held until 1955.

== Awards and decorations ==
- Knight's Cross of the Iron Cross on 23 January 1942 as Oberst i.G. and Chief of Generalstab XXXX. Armeekorps

Military offices
Preceded by Generalleutnant Martin Gilbert	Commander of 110. Infanterie-Division; 1 June 1943 – 25 September 1943	Succeeded by Generalleutnant Albrecht Wüstenhagen
Preceded by Generalleutnant Albrecht Wüstenhagen	Commander of 110. Infanterie-Division; 1 December 1943 – 11 May 1944	Succeeded by Generalmajor Gustav Gihr
Preceded by Generalmajor Gustav Gihr	Commander of 110. Infanterie-Division; 15 May 1944 – July 1944	Succeeded by None
