= Heinrich Meyer-Buerdorf =

German general (1888–1971)

- Born: 13 December 1888
- Died: 1 May 1971 (aged 82)
- Military career
- Allegiance: German Empire; Weimar Republic; Nazi Germany
- Branch: Army
- Service years: 1908–1945
- Rank: General of the Artillery
- Commands: 131st Infantry Division
- Conflicts: World War II
- Awards: Knight's Cross of the Iron Cross

Heinrich Meyer-Buerdorf (13 December 1888 – 1 May 1971) was a general in the Wehrmacht of Nazi Germany during World War II who commanded the 131st Infantry Division. He was a recipient of the Knight's Cross of the Iron Cross.

== Awards ==
- Knight's Cross of the Iron Cross on 15 November 1941 as Generalleutnant and commander of 131. Infanterie-Division

Military offices
Preceded by none	Commander of 131. Infanterie-Division; 1 October 1940 – 10 January 1944	Succeeded by Generalleutnant Friedrich Weber
