= Wilhelm Hasse =

German general and Knight's Cross recipient (1894–1945)

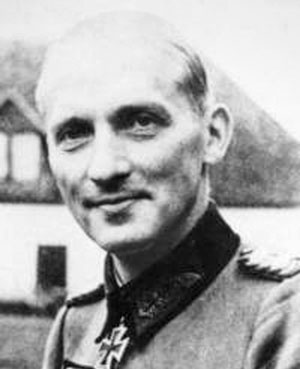
- Born: 24 November 1894; Neisse, Province of Silesia, Kingdom of Prussia, German Empire
- Died: 21 May 1945 (aged 50); Písek, Protectorate of Bohemia and Moravia
- Military career
- Allegiance: German Empire; Weimar Republic; Nazi Germany
- Branch: German Army
- Service years: 1914–1945
- Rank: General der Infanterie
- Unit: Army Group North
- Commands: 30th Infantry Division; II Army Corps; 17th Army
- Conflicts: World War I; World War II; Invasion of Poland; Battle of France; Operation Barbarossa; Siege of Leningrad; Battle of Narva (1944); Riga Offensive (1944); Courland Pocket
- Awards: Knight's Cross of the Iron Cross with Oak Leaves

Wilhelm Hasse (24 November 1894 – 21 May 1945) was a general in the Wehrmacht of Nazi Germany during World War II.

Hasse was born in Neiße, then part of the German Province of Silesia (today, Nysa, Poland) in 1894. He entered the Imperial German Army in 1914 and fought in World War I as a junior officer and a regimental adjutant. At the end of the war, he remained in the peacetime Reichswehr as a career officer and served in several staff postings on the general staff. In World War II, he was a divisional and corps commander, and commanded the 17th Army in the final months of the war in Europe. He was a recipient of the Knight's Cross of the Iron Cross with Oak Leaves. Captured by the Red Army, Hasse died in a prisoner of war camp on 21 May 1945 of wounds sustained earlier that month.

== Awards and decorations ==
- Iron Cross (1914) 2nd Class (17 September 1914) & 1st Class (21 April 1915)
- Knight's Cross of the House Order of Hohenzollern with swords
- Hanseatic Cross of Hamburg
- Wound Badge, in black (1914)
- Clasp to the Iron Cross (1939) 2nd Class (11 September 1939) & 1st Class (2 October 1939)
- German Cross in Gold on 26 January 1942 as Oberst im Generalstab (in the General Staff) of AOK 18
- Knight's Cross of the Iron Cross with Oak Leaves
  - Knight's Cross on 12 August 1944 as Generalleutnant and commander of 30 Infanterie-Division
  - Oak Leaves on 14 January 1945 as General der Infanterie and commander of II. Armeekorps

Military offices
| Preceded by Generalleutnant Kurt Brennecke | Chief of Staff of Heeresgruppe Nord; 25 January 1942 – 22 January 1943 | Succeeded by Generalleutnant Eberhard Kinzel |
| Preceded by Generalmajor Gerhard Henke | Commander of 30. Infanterie-Division; 5 November 1943 – 15 March 1944 | Succeeded by Generalleutnant Hans von Basse |
| Preceded by General der Infanterie Paul Laux | Commander of II. Armeekorps; 1 April 1944 – 4 May 1944 | Succeeded by Generalleutnant Kurt von Tippelskirch |
| Preceded by General der Infanterie Paul Laux | Commander of II. Armeekorps; 3 July 1944 – 20 February 1945 | Succeeded by General der Infanterie Dr. Johannes Mayer |
| Preceded by General der Infanterie Friedrich Schulz | Commander of 17. Armee; 1 April 1945 – 7 May 1945 | Succeeded by none |
