= Werner Schulze =

German General (1895–1966)

- Born: 15 January 1895; Calbe (Saale), Regierungsbezirk Magdeburg, Province of Saxony, Kingdom of Prussia, German Empire
- Died: 3 November 1966 (aged 71); Stuttgart, Baden-Württemberg, West Germany
- Military career
- Allegiance: German Empire; Weimar Republic; Nazi Germany
- Branch: Prussian Army; Imperial German Army; Freikorps (Freiwilliges Landesjäger-Korps); Reichswehr; German Army (Wehrmacht)
- Service years: 1913–23; 1935–45
- Rank: Generalmajor
- Commands: 329. Infanterie-Division; 131. Infanterie-Division; 14. Infanterie-Division
- Conflicts: World War I World War II: Poland Campaign; Operation Barbarossa; Battle of Kiev (1941); Battle of Moscow; Siege of Leningrad; Battle of Narva (1944); Baltic Offensive (1944); East Prussian Offensive
- Awards: Knight's Cross of the Iron Cross with Oak Leaves
- Other work: Insurance salesman, later Prokurist; NSDAP Ortsgruppenleiter (Party member since 1 October 1931)

Werner Schulze (15 January 1895 – 3 November 1966) was a German general in the Wehrmacht during World War II who commanded several divisions. He was a recipient of the Knight's Cross of the Iron Cross with Oak Leaves of Nazi Germany. From May 1945 to 1948, he was a British prisoner of war (POW). He then lived in Stuttgart and once again, as he did from 1924 to 1939, worked for an insurance company.

== Promotions ==
- 14 September 1913: Fahnenjunker (Officer Candidate)
- 20 May 1914: Fähnrich (Officer Cadet)
- 6 August 1914: Leutnant (2nd Lieutenant) with Patent from 29 January 1913
- 18 April 1918: Oberleutnant (1st Lieutenant)
  - retired on 17 November effective 1 December 1923
- 1 January 1935: Hauptmann der Reserve (Captain of the Reserves)
  - reactivated as a reserves officer of the Wehrmacht on 9 May 1939
- 1 October 1941: Major der Reserve
- 1 December 1942: Oberstleutnant der Reserve (Lieutenant Colonel of the Reserves)
- 1 June 1943: Oberst der Reserve (Colonel of the Reserves)
- 30 January 1945: Generalmajor der Reserve (Major General of the Reserves) with Rank Seniority (RDA) from 1 January 1945

== Awards and decorations ==
- Iron Cross (1914), 2nd and 1st Class
- Honour Cross of the World War 1914/1918 with Swords
- War Merit Cross (1939), 2nd Class with Swords on 20 October 1940
- Repetition Clasp 1939 to the Iron Cross 1914, 2nd and 1st Class
  - Clasp to EK II on 29 July 1941
  - Clasp to EK I on 4 August 1941
- Honour Roll Clasp of the Army (28 November 1941)
- Certificate of Recognition of the Commander-in-Chief of the Army (Anerkennungsurkunde des Oberbefehlshabers des Heeres)
- Infantry Assault Badge on 7 March 1942
- Eastern Front Medal on 7 September 1942
- Reference in the Wehrmachtbericht on 21 September 1944
- German Cross in Gold on 2 October 1943 as Oberst of the Reserves in Grenadier-Regiment 551
- Knight's Cross of the Iron Cross with Oak Leaves
  - Knight's Cross on 7 March 1942 as Major of the Reserves and commander of II./Infanterie-Regiment 510
  - 557th Oak Leaves on 23 August 1944 as Oberst of the Reserves and commander of Grenadier-Regiment 551

Military offices
Preceded by Generalleutnant Dr. Johannes Mayer	Commander of 329. Infanterie-Division; 16 July 1944 – 20 October 1944	Succeeded by Generalleutnant Konrad Menkel
Preceded by Generalleutnant Friedrich Weber	Commander of 131. Infanterie-Division; 28 October 1944 – March 1945	Succeeded by Unknown
Preceded by Oberst Kirch	Commander of 14. Infanterie-Division; March 1945 – April 1945	Succeeded by none
