= Johannes Mayer =

WW2 German Army general (1893-1963)

Dr. rer. pol. Dr.-Ing. Johannes Mayer
- Born: 6 September 1893
- Died: 7 August 1963 (aged 69)
- Relatives: Dr. phil. Lic. theol. Gottlob Mayer (father); Generalarzt Dr. med. Hans Mayer (cousin); Gustav Schmidt (brother in law)
- Military career
- Allegiance: German Empire; Weimar Republic; Nazi Germany
- Branch: German Army
- Service years: 1914–1945
- Rank: General der Infanterie
- Conflicts: World War I World War II
- Awards: Knight's Cross of the Iron Cross with Oak Leaves and Swords
- Other work: Engineer

Johannes "Hans" Theodor Mayer (6 September 1893 – 7 August 1963) was a German General of the Infantry in the Wehrmacht of Nazi Germany during World War II. He was a recipient of the Knight's Cross of the Iron Cross with Oak Leaves and Swords.

== Promotions ==
- 9.3.1915 Fahnenjunker
- 2.9.1915 Fähnrich
- 5.11.1915 Leutnant (Patent from 23.3.1914)
- 1.7.1922 Leutnant with Patent from 1.4.1914
- 1.7.1923 Oberleutnant
- 1.4.1928 Rittmeister
  - later changed to Hauptmann
- 1.2.1935 Major
- 1.10.1937 Oberstleutnant
- 1.10.1940 Oberst
- 1.4.1942 Generalmajor (without RDA)
- 1.9.1942 Generalmajor (with RDA)
- 1.2.1943 Generalleutnant
- 1.4.1945 General der Infanterie

== Awards ==
- Iron Cross (1914)
  - 2nd Class (24 August 1915)
  - 1st Class (16 December 1916)
- The Honour Cross of the World War 1914/1918 with swords
- Wehrmacht Long Service Award, 4th to 1st class
- Clasp to the Iron Cross
  - 2nd Class (6 June 1940)
  - 1st Class (9 June 1940)
- Infantry Assault Badge in Silver
- Eastern Front Medal
- Wound Badge in Black (1944)
- Cuff title "Kurland"
- Knight's Cross of the Iron Cross with Oak Leaves and Swords
  - Knight's Cross on 13 September 1941 as Oberst and commander of Infanterie-Regiment 501/290. Infanterie-Division/X. Armee-Korps/16. Armee/Heeresgruppe Nord
  - Oak Leaves on 13 April 1944 as Generalleutnant and commander of the 329. Infanterie-Division
  - Swords on 23 August 1944 as Generalleutnant and commander of the 329. Infanterie-Division/VIII. Armee-Korps/16. Armee/Heeresgruppe Nord

Military offices
Preceded by Oberst Bruno Hippler	Commander of 329th Infanterie-Division; 22 March 1942 – 9 August 1943	Succeeded by Generalleutnant Paul Winter
Preceded by Generalleutnant Paul Winter	Commander of 329th Infanterie-Division; September, 1943 – 16 July 1944	Succeeded by Generalmajor der Reserve Werner Schulze
Preceded by General der Infanterie Hermann Foertsch	Commander of X. Armeekorps; 21 December 1944 – 27 December 1944	Succeeded by General der Artillerie Siegfried Thomaschki
Preceded by General der Infanterie Wilhelm Hasse	Commander of II. Armeekorps; 15 January 1945 – 1 April 1945	Succeeded by Generalleutnant Alfred Gause
