= Demyansk Pocket =

1942 battle of WW2's Eastern Front

- Part of the Eastern Front of World War II
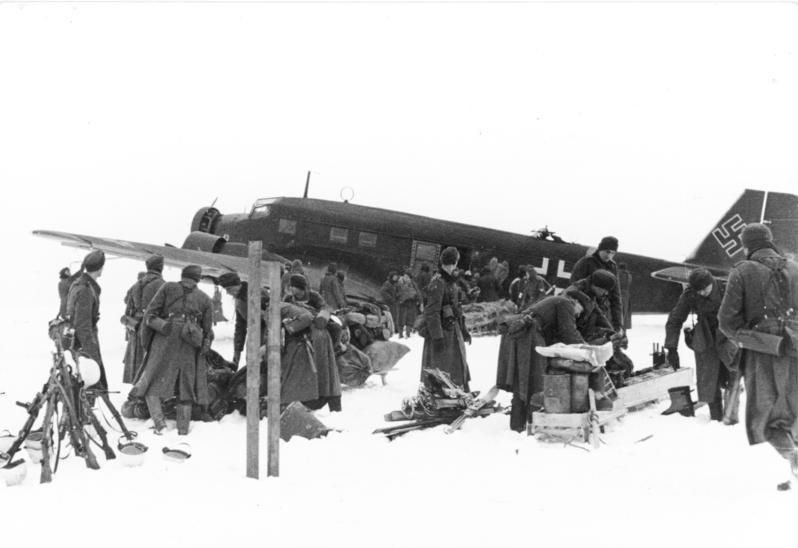
| Date | 8 February – 20 May 1942 |
| Location | Demyansk, Russian SSR, Soviet Union 57.6500°N 32.4667°E |
| Result | German victory |

Belligerents
| Germany | Soviet Union |

Commanders and leaders
| Walter von Brockdorff-Ahlefeldt; Walther von Seydlitz-Kurzbach | Pavel Kurochkin |

Units involved
| 16th Army | Northwestern Front |

Strength
| 100,000 (initially); 31,000 (reinforcements) | 400,000 (initially) |

Casualties and losses
| 9,000 KIA and MIA; 46,000 WIA; 265 aircraft destroyed Total: 55,000 | 88,908 killed & missing 156,603 wounded Total: 245,500 |
- Soviet civilians: Unknown, between 20.000 (official number) and more than 100.000
- Location of Demyansk within modern European Russia

The Demyansk Pocket (German: Kessel von Demjansk; Russian: Демя́нский котёл) was the name given to the pocket of German troops encircled by the Red Army around Demyansk, south of Leningrad, on World War II's Eastern Front. The pocket existed mainly from 8 February to 21 April 1942.

A much smaller force was surrounded in the Kholm Pocket at the town of Kholm, about 100 km (62 mi) to the southwest. Both resulted from the German retreat after its defeat during the Battle of Moscow.

The successful defence of Demyansk was achieved by using an airbridge and was a significant development in modern warfare. Its success was a major contributor to the decision by the Army High Command to try the same tactic during the Battle of Stalingrad, but it then failed to save the 6th Army, commanded by Friedrich Paulus.

== Encirclement ==
The encirclement began as the Demyansk Offensive Operation, the first phase being carried out from 7 January until 20 May 1942 on the initiative of General Lieutenant Pavel Kurochkin, commander of Northwestern Front. The intention was to sever the link between the German Demyansk positions, and the Staraya Russa railway that formed the lines of communication of the German 16th Army. However, owing to the very difficult wooded and swampy terrain, and heavy snow cover, the initial advance by the Front was very modest against stubborn opposition.

On 8 January, the Rzhev–Vyazma Strategic Offensive was launched by the Red Army. This incorporated the previous Front's planning into the Toropets–Kholm Offensive Operation between 9 January and 6 February 1942 which formed the southern pincer of the attack that, beginning the second phase of the northern pincer Demyansk Offensive Operation between 7 January and 20 May, which encircled the German 16th Army's (Generaloberst Ernst Busch) II Army Corps, and parts of the X Army Corps during winter 1941/1942.

German forces inside the pocket consisted of :

X Army Corps (General Christian Hansen)

- 30th Infantry Division (Generalleutnant Kurt von Tippelskirch)
- 290th Infantry Division (Generalleutnant Theodor von Wrede)
- SS Division Totenkopf (Obergruppenführer Theodor Eicke)

II Army Corps (General Walter von Brockdorff-Ahlefeldt)

- 12th Infantry Division (Oberst Karl Hernekamp)
- 32nd Infantry Division (Generalmajor Wilhelm Bohnstedt)
- 123rd Infantry Division (Generalmajor Erwin Rauch)

Auxiliary units

- units of Police Regiment North
- units of the Reich Labour Service
- units of organisation Todt
- two squads of Lithuanian Schutzmannschaft Battalion 5

for a total of about 90,000 German troops and around 10,000 auxiliaries. Their commander was General Walter von Brockdorff-Ahlefeldt, commander of the II Army Corps.

== Northwestern Front offensives ==
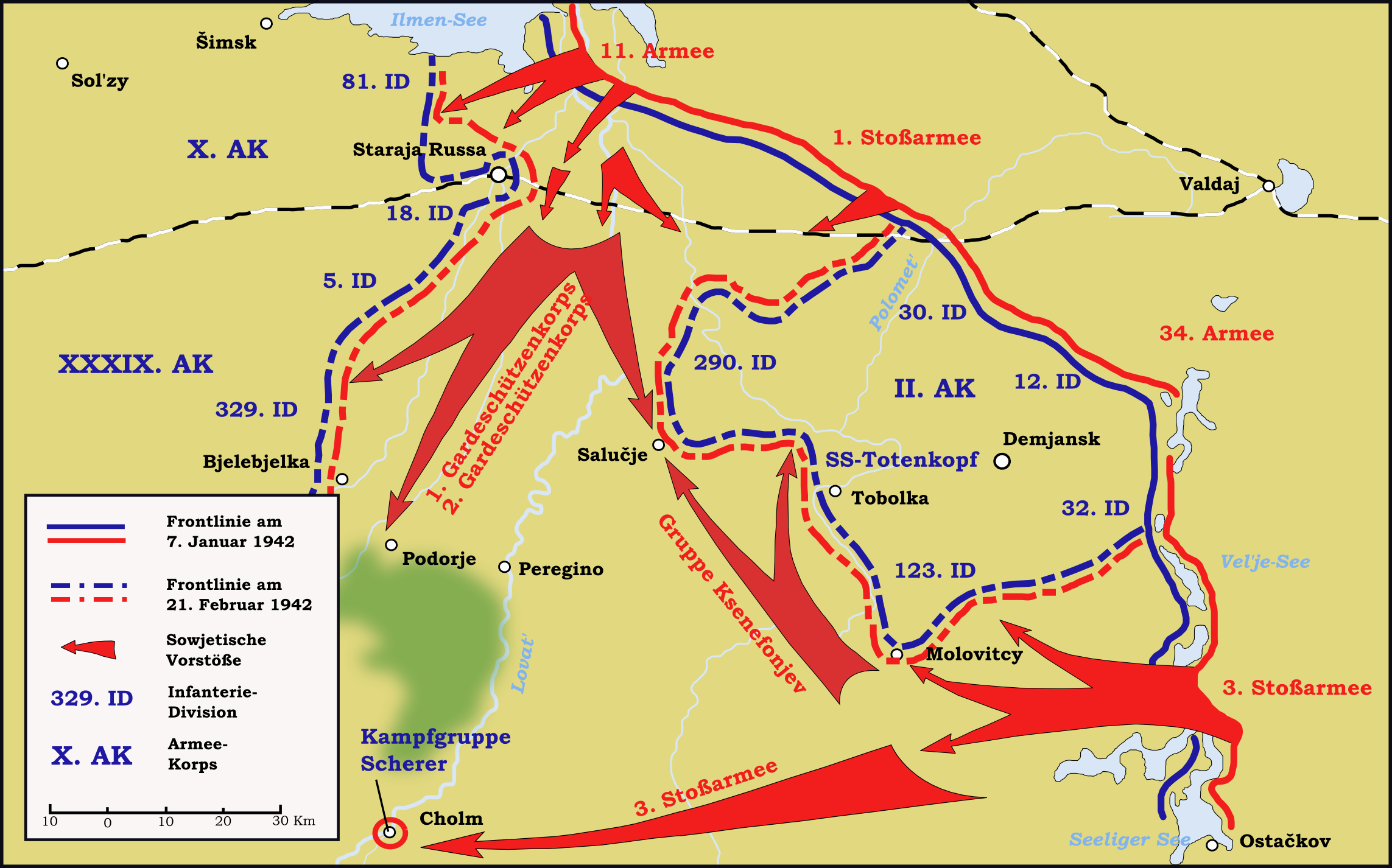
Offensive of the Red Army south of Lake Ilmen, 7 January–21 February 1942.

The intent of the Northwestern Front offensive was to encircle the entire northern flank of the 16th Army's forces, of which the 2nd Army Corps was only a small part, and the Soviet command was desperate to keep the Front moving even after this success. The first thrust was made by the 11th Army, 1st Shock Army and the 1st and 2nd Guards Rifle Corps released for the operation from Stavka reserve. A second thrust was executed on 12 February by the 3rd and 4th Shock Armies of the Kalinin Front, with the additional plan of directly attacking the encircled German forces by inserting two airborne brigades to support the advance of the 34th Army. The front soon settled as the Soviet offensive petered out due to difficult terrain and bad weather.

After being assured that the pocket could be supplied with its daily requirement of 300 short tons (270 t) of supplies by Luftflotte 1, Hitler ordered that the surrounded divisions hold their positions until relieved. The pocket contained two viable airfields at Demyansk and Peski capable of receiving transport aircraft. From the middle of February, the weather improved significantly, and while there was still considerable snow on the ground at this time, resupply operations were generally very successful due to inactivity of the Soviet Air Forces (VVS) in the area. However, the operation did use up all of Luftflotte 1's transport capability, as well as elements of its bomber force.

Over the winter and spring, the Northwestern Front launched a number of attacks on the "Ramushevo corridor" that formed the tenuous link between Demyansk and Staraya Russa but was unable to reduce the pocket.

== Breakout ==
On 21 March 1942, German forces under the command of General Walther von Seydlitz-Kurzbach attempted to manoeuvre through the "Ramushevo corridor". Soviet resistance on the Lovat River delayed II Corps' attack until April 14. Over the next several weeks, this corridor was widened. A battle group was able to break the siege on 22 April, but the fighting had taken a heavy toll. Out of the approximately 100,000 men originally in the pocket, there were 3,335 lost and over 10,000 wounded.

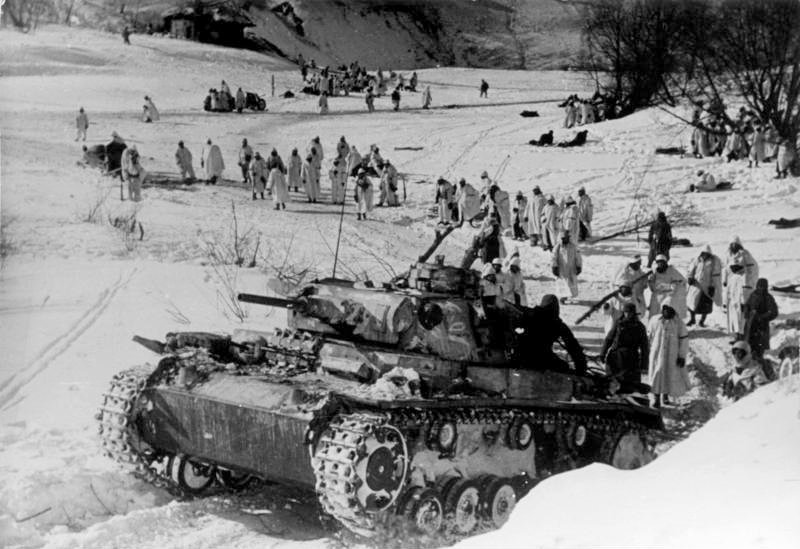
German forces near Demyansk, 21 March 1942.

By the time that ground communications with Kholm and Demyansk were regained in May 1942, Luftflotte 1 had flown 14,455 air transport sorties into the pockets. A total of 24,303 tons of supplies and equipment, as well as 15,446 replacements, were flown into the pockets and 22,093 wounded were flown out.

The cost to the Luftwaffe was significant, with the loss of 265 aircraft, including 106 Junkers Ju 52, 17 Heinkel He 111 and two Junkers Ju 86 aircraft. In addition, 387 airmen were lost. Richard Overy argues that the Demyansk airlift was a Pyrrhic victory, citing the loss of over 200 aircraft and their crew "when annual production of transports was running at only 500; and all to save 90,000 German soldiers, 64,000 of whom were either killed, wounded or too sick for service" by the airlift's end.

Fighting in the area continued until 28 February 1943. The Soviet forces did not retake Demyansk until 1 March 1943, with the organized withdrawal of the German troops.

== Effect on future operations ==
The success of the Luftwaffe convinced Reichsmarschall Hermann Göring and Hitler that they could conduct effective airlift operations on the Eastern front. Furthermore, it "determined Hitler in his belief that encircled troops should automatically hold on to their territory.

After the German 6th Army was encircled in the Battle of Stalingrad, Göring convinced Hitler to resupply the besieged forces by airlift until a relief effort could reach them. However the sheer scale of the effort required in Stalingrad – calculated at 750 tons per day – greatly exceeded the Luftwaffe's now-depleted capacities, when up against the now-strengthened Soviet Air Forces. The Stalingrad airlift effort ultimately failed to deliver sufficient supplies before the airfields were overrun by the Soviets, and the Germans estimated that they lost 488 transports, as well as 1,000 personnel. In spite of the airlift's obvious shortcomings, Hitler refused permission for the 6th Army to attempt a breakout. The remaining 300,000 German soldiers trapped in the city ran out of supplies and had to surrender in February 1943, after having lost 100,000 soldiers in combat between November 1942 and February 1943.

== Sources ==
- Beevor, Antony (1999). Stalingrad. London: Penguin Books. ISBN 9780140249859 – via Internet Archive.
- Beevor, Antony (2012). The Second World War. New York: Back Bay Books. ISBN 978-0-316-02374-0 – via Internet Archive.
- Bergstrom, Christer (2007). Stalingrad: The Air Battle: 1942-January 1943. London: Chevron/Ian Allan. ISBN 978-1-85780-276-4.
- "Сборник. На Северо-Западном фронте — М.: «Наука», 1969" [Collection. On the North-Western Front — Moscow: "Nauka", 1969], victory.mil.ru, archived from the original on 24 February 2008
- Glantz, David (October 1992). "The Ghosts of Demiansk: In Memory of the Soldiers of the Soviet 1st Airborne Corps". Journal of Military History. 56 (4): 617–650. doi:10.2307/1986164. JSTOR 1986164.
- Glantz, David (2001). "The Soviet-German War 1941-1945: Myths and Realities: A Survey Essay". Strom Thurmond Institute. Archived from the original on 22 July 2017.
- Hayward, Joel (Spring 1997). "Stalingrad: An Examination of Hitler's Decision to Airlift" (PDF). Airpower Journal. 11 (1): 21–37. Archived from the original (PDF) on 2023-07-07.
- Overy, Richard (July 1980). "Hitler and Air Strategy". Journal of Contemporary History. 15 (3): 405–421. doi:10.1177/002200948001500302. JSTOR 260411. S2CID 162229330.
- Rutherford, Jeff (2008). "Life and Death in the Demiansk Pocket: The 123rd Infantry Division in Combat and Occupation". Central European History. 41 (3): 347–380. doi:10.1017/S0008938908000551. JSTOR 20457366. S2CID 145326850.
- Forczyk, Robert (2012). Demyansk 1942-1943:The frozen fortress. Oxford: Osprey Publishing. ISBN 9781849085526.
