= Maximilian de Angelis =

German general

- Born: 2 October 1889; Budapest, Royal Hungary, Imp.&R. Austria-Hungary
- Died: 6 December 1974 (aged 85); Graz, Austria
- Military career
- Allegiance: (Austria-Hungary) Austria–Hungary; Republic of German-Austria; First Austrian Republic; Nazi Germany
- Branch: Austro-Hungarian Army; German-Austrian People's Militia; Bundesheer; Army (Wehrmacht)
- Service years: 1910–1945
- Rank: General der Artillerie
- Commands: 76th Infantry Division; XXXXIV Army Corps; 6th Army; 2nd Panzer Army
- Conflicts: World War I; World War II
- Awards: Knight's Cross of the Iron Cross with Oak Leaves

Maximilian de Angelis (2 October 1889 – 6 December 1974) was a general in the Wehrmacht of Nazi Germany during World War II. He was a recipient of the Knight's Cross of the Iron Cross with Oak Leaves.

On 4 April 1946 Angelis was extradited to Yugoslavia and sentenced to 20 years for war crimes. He was then extradited to the Soviet Union and sentenced to two times 25 years. He was released in 1955 and repatriated to Germany.

== Awards and decorations ==
- Austro-Hungarian Military Merit Medal (Signum Laudis) in Bronze on the ribbon for wartime merit on 4 November 1914
  - When the "swords" were introduced on 13 December 1916, he was subsequently awarded this distinction.
- Military Merit Cross (Austria-Hungary), 3rd Class with the War Decoration (ÖM3K) on 25 March 1915
  - When the "swords" were introduced to the war decoration on 13 December 1916, he was subsequently awarded this distinction (ÖM3KX).
- Austro-Hungarian Military Merit Medal (Signum Laudis) in Silver on the ribbon for wartime merit on 11 November 1916
  - When the "swords" were introduced on 13 December 1916, he was subsequently awarded this distinction.
- Austro-Hungarian Karl Troop Cross on 28 June 1917
- Military Merit Cross (Austria-Hungary), 3rd Class with the War Decoration and Swords (ÖM3KX) on 23 May 1918; 2nd time awarded
- Austrian War Commemorative Medal with Swords on 8 July 1933
- Austrian Order of Merit (1934), Knight's Cross 1st Class on 12 May 1936
- Military Service Badge (Austria) for Officers, 2nd Class (for 25 years) on 3 September 1936
- Honour Cross of the World War 1914/1918 with Swords
- Wehrmacht Long Service Award, 4th to 1st Class (25-year Service Cross)
- Iron Cross (1939), 2nd and 1st Class
  - 2nd Class on 13 May 1940
  - 1st Class on 1 June 1940
- Order of Michael the Brave, 3rd Class on 19 September 1941
- Winter Battle in the East 1941–42 Medal on 25 August 1942
- Knight's Cross of the Iron Cross with Oak Leaves
  - Knight's Cross on 9 February 1942 as Generalleutnant and Commander of the 76. Infanterie-Division
  - 323rd Oak Leaves on 12 November 1943 as General der Artillerie and Commanding General of the XXXXIV. Armeekorps

Military offices
| Preceded by none | Commander of 76. Infanterie-Division; 1 September 1939 – 26 January 1942 | Succeeded by Generalleutnant Carl Rodenburg |
| Preceded by Generalleutnant Otto Stapf | Commander of XXXXIV Army Corps; 26 January 1942 - 30 November 1943 | Succeeded by General der Infanterie Friedrich Köchling |
| Preceded by General der Infanterie Friedrich Köchling | Commander of XXXXIV Army Corps; 15 January 1944 - 8 April 1944 | Succeeded by General der Infanterie Ludwig Müller |
| Preceded by General Karl-Adolf Hollidt | Commander of 6. Armee; 8 April 1944 – 16 July 1944 | Succeeded by General Maximilian Fretter-Pico |
| Preceded by General der Infanterie Franz Böhme | Commander of 2. Panzer-Armee; 18 July 1944 – 8 May 1945 | Succeeded by none |
