= Fortress Division Warsaw =

- Active: January 1945
- Country: Nazi Germany
- Branch: Army
- Type: Infantry
- Size: Division
- Garrison/HQ: Warsaw
- Engagements: World War II: Vistula-Oder Offensive

Commanders
- Notable commanders: Friedrich Weber

The Fortress Division Warsaw (German: Festung-Division “Warschau”) was a fortress division of the Army Group A of the German Wehrmacht in World War II.

Ordered formed on 12 January 1945, the Fortress Division Warsaw was formed in Warsaw by converting a number of various units into the division. The division was destroyed in the fighting for the capture of Warsaw by the Soviets, its remains being either captured or fleeing back into Germany.

== Divisional history ==
The division was set up in early January 1945 in the Polish capital Warsaw to defend the same against the Red Army as part of the strategy of permanent positions.

The dissolving division, subordinate to the 9th Army, was initially probably enclosed in Warsaw (on January 16, the defense consisted of only four battalions of the fortress division). and later, after the city was captured, on January 18, 1945, almost completely destroyed by the Red Army. Then the remnants of the Fortress Division Warsaw united with the 73rd Infantry Division to strengthen the defense of Festung Thorn. Previously, the commander of the 9th Army, General der Panzertruppe Smilo von Lüttwitz, had given up the defense of the city without a higher order, which dissolved the cohesion of the troops. Generalleutnant Friedrich Weber, the commander of the fortress division, was then transferred to the Führerreserve, sentenced to parole at the front and no longer received a military command.

The division was officially disbanded on February 27, 1945.

== Commander ==
Generalleutnant Friedrich Weber (January 1945).

== Organization ==
- Festungs-Regiment 8
  - 1. Bataillon (formerly Festungs-Infanterie-Bataillon 1401)
  - 2. / 3. Bataillon
  - 4. Bataillon (formerly Festungs-MG-Bataillon 24)
  - Panzerjäger-Kompanie 17
- Festungs-Regiment 88
  - 1. Bataillon (formerly Landesschützen-Bataillon 238)
  - 2. Bataillon (formerly Landeswehr-Bataillon Weckerle)
  - 3. Bataillon
  - 4. Bataillon (formerly Festungs-MG-Bataillon 25)
  - Panzerjäger-Kompanie 16
- Festungs-Regiment 183
  - 1. / 2. / 3. / 4. Bataillon
- Festungs-Artillerie-Regiment 1320
  - Festungs-Granatwerfer-Bataillon 22
  - Festungs-Granatwerfer-Bataillon 23
- Festungs-Pionier-Bataillon 67
- Nachrichtentruppe 1320
- Nachschubtruppen 1320

== Bibliography ==
- Hans Jürgen Pantenius: Letzte Schlacht an der Ostfront: von Döberitz bis Danzig 1944/1945 : Erinnerung und Erfahrung eines jungen Regimentskommandeurs. Mittler E.S. + Sohn GmbH, 2002, pg. 101.
- Mitcham, Samuel W., Jr. (2007). German Order of Battle. Volume Two: 291st – 999th Infantry Divisions, Named Infantry Divisions, and Special Divisions in WWII. PA; United States of America: Stackpole Books. pg. 235, ISBN 978-0-8117-3437-0.
