= 110th Infantry Division (Wehrmacht) =

- German: 110. Infanterie-Division
- Active: April 1940 – 1944
- Country: Nazi Germany
- Branch: Army
- Type: Infantry
- Size: Division
- Engagements: World War II: Operation Barbarossa

The 110th Infantry Division (German: 110. Infanterie-Division) of the German army (Wehrmacht) was formed in April 1940 in Lüneburg under the 11. Armee and was commanded by Generalleutnant Ernst Seifert. Until June 1941 and the commencement of Operation Barbarossa on the 22nd day of that month, it was stationed in Poland. It fought on the Eastern Front as part of Army Group Centre, VI Corps and had, by the end of the war, nine Knight's Cross of the Iron Cross holders, four of whom received their awards in November 1943. The division was destroyed by Soviet forces in July 1944. The division itself consisted of three infantry regiments and an artillery regiment.

== Commanding officers ==
- Generalleutnant Ernst Seifert, 10 December 1940 – 24 January 1942
- Generalleutnant Martin Gilbert, 1 February 1942 – 1 June 1943
- Generalleutnant Eberhard von Kurowski, 1 June 1943 – 25 September 1943
- Generalleutnant Albrecht Wüstenhagen, 25 September 1943 – 1 December 1943
- Generalleutnant Eberhard von Kurowski, 1 December 1943 – 11 May 1944
- Generalmajor Gustav Gihr, 11 May 1944 – 15 May 1944
- Generalleutnant Eberhard von Kurowski, 15 May 1944 – July 1944
