= Paul Laux =

German general in the Wehrmacht

- Born: 11 November 1887; Weimar
- Died: 2 September 1944 (aged 56); Riga
- Military career
- Allegiance: German Empire; Weimar Republic; Nazi Germany
- Branch: German Army
- Service years: 1907–1944
- Rank: General der Infanterie
- Commands: 126th Infantry Division; II Army Corps; 16th Army
- Conflicts: World War I; World War II; Invasion of Poland; Battle of France; Operation Barbarossa; Siege of Leningrad; Battle of Narva (1944); Šiauliai Offensive
- Awards: Knight's Cross of the Iron Cross with Oak Leaves

Paul Laux (11 November 1887 – 2 September 1944) was a German general in the Wehrmacht during World War II who commanded the 16th Army. He was a recipient of the Knight's Cross of the Iron Cross with Oak Leaves of Nazi Germany.

Laux took command of the 10th Division in Passau. On 18 March some of these troops reached Vienna. In March 1939, when National Socialists and the 85th Infantry Regiment commemorated fallen heroes on the Passau Cathedral Square, Laux praised Adolf Hitler. Next, his men invaded Bohemia. On 13 April Laux commemorated the annexation of Austria in Passau.

As commanding officer of the 126th Infantry Division, Laux took part in Operation Barbarossa, the invasion of the Soviet Union. On 29 August 1944 Paul Laux crashed during a reconnaissance flight. He died of his injuries on 2 September 1944.

== Awards ==
- Clasp to the Iron Cross (1939) 2nd Class (January 1940) & 1st Class (July 1940)
- Knight's Cross of the Iron Cross with Oak Leaves
  - Knight's Cross on 14 December 1941 as Generalleutnant and commander of 126. Infanterie-Division
  - 237th Oak Leaves on 17 May 1943 as General der Infanterie and commander of II Armeekorps

Military offices
Preceded by none	Commander of 126. Infanterie-Division; 15 October 1940 – 8 October 1942	Succeeded by Generalleutnant Harry Hoppe
Preceded by General der Infanterie Walter Graf von Brockdorff-Ahlefeldt	Commander of II. Armeekorps; 28 November 1943 – 1 April 1944	Succeeded by Generalleutnant Wilhelm Hasse
Preceded by Generalleutnant Kurt von Tippelskirch	Commander of II. Armeekorps; 11 May 1944 – 3 July 1944	Succeeded by Generalleutnant Wilhelm Hasse
Preceded by General der Artillerie Christian Hansen	Commander of 16. Armee; 2 July 1944 – 30 August 1944	Succeeded by Generaloberst Carl Hilpert
