= Walter von Brockdorff-Ahlefeldt =

German general (1887–1943)

Walter Graf von Brockdorff-Ahlefeldt
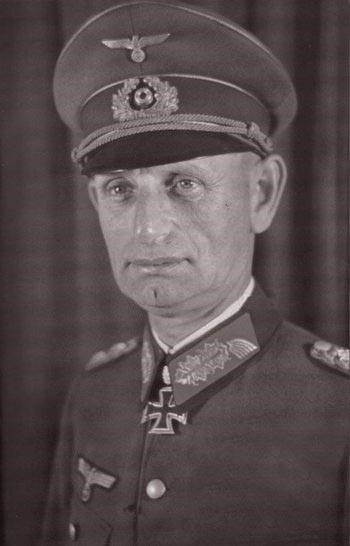
- Walter von Brockdorff-Ahlefeldt
- Born: 13 July 1887; Perleberg, German Empire
- Died: 9 May 1943 (aged 55); Berlin, Nazi Germany
- Military career
- Allegiance: German Empire; Weimar Republic; Nazi Germany
- Branch: German Army
- Service years: 1907–1943
- Rank: General der Infanterie
- Commands: 23rd Infantry Division; XXVIII Army Corps; II Army Corps
- Conflicts: World War I; World War II; Invasion of Poland; Battle of France; Operation Barbarossa; Demyansk Pocket
- Awards: Knight's Cross of the Iron Cross with Oak Leaves

Walter von Brockdorff-Ahlefeldt (13 July 1887 – 9 May 1943) was a German general (General of the Infantry) during World War II. He was a recipient of the Knight's Cross of the Iron Cross with Oak Leaves. Brockdorff-Ahlefeldt became ill in November 1942 and returned to Germany. He died in a hospital in Berlin. Brockdorff-Ahlefeldt was a descendant of Danish-Holsteiner nobility.

== Awards ==
- Clasp to the Iron Cross (1939) 2nd Class (19 September 1939) & 1st Class (20 October 1939)
- Knight's Cross of the Iron Cross with Oak Leaves
  - Knight's Cross on 15 July 1941 as General der Infanterie and commanding general of the II. Armeekorps
  - 103rd Oak Leaves on 27 June 1942 as General der Infanterie and commanding general of the II. Armeekorps

Military offices
Preceded by Generalleutnant Ernst Busch	Commander of 23. Infanterie-Division; February 1938 – 1 June 1940	Succeeded by Generalleutnant Heinz Hellmich
Preceded by none	Commander of XXVIII. Armeekorps; 1 June 1940 – 20 June 1940	Succeeded by General der Artillerie Peter Weyer
Preceded by General der Infanterie Karl-Heinrich von Stülpnagel	Commander of II. Armeekorps; 21 June 1940 – June 1942	Succeeded by General der Panzertruppe Otto von Knobelsdorff
Preceded by General der Panzertruppe Otto von Knobelsdorff	Commander of II. Armeekorps; 1 July 1942 – 19 January 1943	Succeeded by General der Infanterie Paul Laux
