= Paul Danhauser =

German general (1892–1975)

- Born: 2 August 1892
- Died: 11 December 1975 (aged 83)
- Allegiance: Nazi Germany
- Branch: Army
- Service years: 1911–1945
- Rank: Generalleutnant
- Commands: 256th Infantry Division; 271st Infantry Division
- Conflicts: World War II
- Awards: Knight's Cross of the Iron Cross

Paul Danhauser (2 August 1892 – 11 December 1975) was a general in the Wehrmacht of Nazi Germany during World War II. He was a recipient of the Knight's Cross of the Iron Cross.

== Awards ==
- Knight's Cross of the Iron Cross on 10 February 1942 as Oberst and commander of Infanterie-Regiment 427

Military offices
Preceded by Generalleutnant Friedrich Weber	Commander of 256. Infanterie-Division; 14 February 1942 – 24 November 1943	Succeeded by Generalleutnant Albrecht Wüstenhagen
Preceded by None	Commander of 271. Infanterie-Division; 10 December 1943 – 15 September 1944	Succeeded by None
