= Walter Brugmann =

Nazi German architect

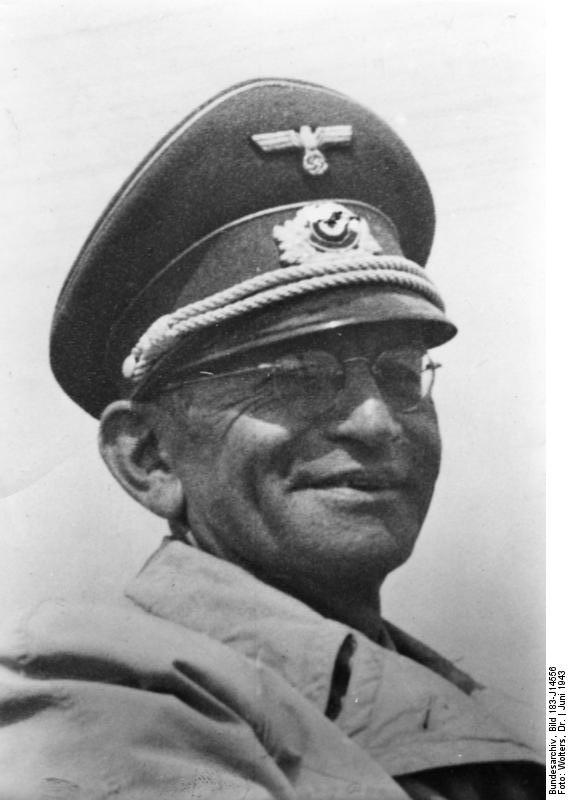
- Born: 2 April 1887; Leipzig, German Empire
- Died: 26 May 1944 (aged 57); The Eastern Front
- Political party: (Nazi Germany) NSDAP

Walter Brugmann (2 April 1887 – 26 May 1944) was a Nazi German architect. From 1928 he was head of the city engineering office in Leipzig. From 1933, he was a city planner in Nuremberg, and in 1940 worked as general supervisor for Berlin. From 1942 he worked as head of the Organisation Todt in southern Russia. A member of the Nazi Party (NSDAP), he died in an unexplained plane crash, 1944.

Brugmann led the Nuremberg Office of Structural Engineering of the massive Party Rally Grounds project devised by Adolf Hitler, consisting of a marching field for military exercises, stadium, arena, congress hall, and zeppelin field. Brugmann handled stone supplies delivered by concentration camp prisoners. The project took off in 1940, when the slave labor brought in from across Europe delivered 19,075 cubic meters of quality stone to Nuremberg Party Rally Grounds for Brugmann’s construction. Work came to a complete stop in 1943 due to looming German defeat at the front.

== See also ==
- List of Nazi Party members
