= Otto Stapf (officer) =

German general during World War II

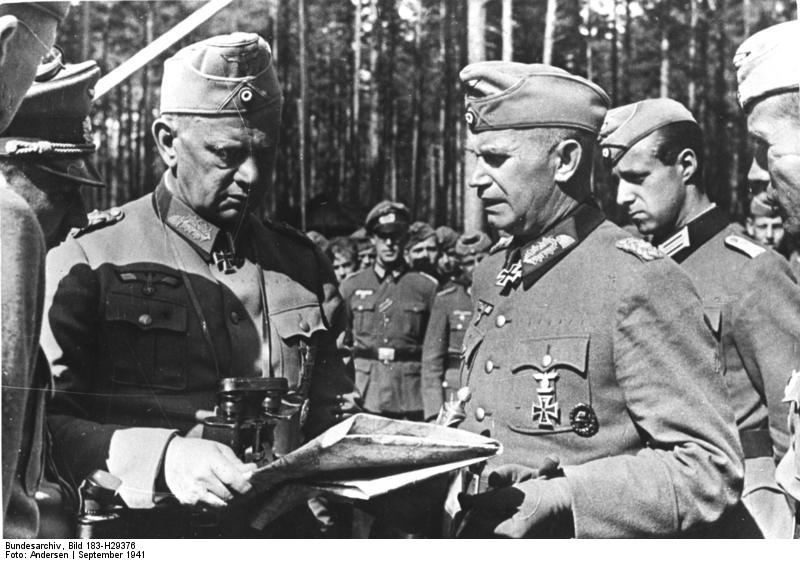
- Generalfeldmarschall Walther von Reichenau and Otto Stapf (right) at the Eastern Front in September 1941
- Born: 13 November 1890; Hellmitzheim, Kingdom of Bavaria, German Empire
- Died: 30 March 1963 (aged 72); Munich, Bavaria, West Germany
- Relatives: ∞ 25 September 1923 Carin Fjellmann; 3 children
- Military career
- Allegiance: German Empire; Weimar Republic; Nazi Germany
- Branch: Bavarian Army; Imperial German Army; Freikorps; Reichswehr; Army
- Service years: 1910–45
- Rank: General der Infanterie
- Commands: 111th Infantry Division; XXXXIV. Armeekorps
- Conflicts: World War I World War II: Battle of France; Operation Barbarossa; Battle of Kiev (1941)
- Awards: Knight's Cross of the Iron Cross

Otto Johann Leonhard Stapf (13 November 1890 – 30 March 1963) was a German general during World War II who commanded the 111th Infantry Division and the XXXXIV. Army Corps and led the Economic Staff East. He was the only recipient of both the Knight's Cross of the Iron Cross and the Knight's Cross of the War Merit Cross with Swords of Nazi Germany.

== Life ==
=== Early years and World War I ===
Otto Stapf was born on 13 November 1890 in Hellmitzheim in Middle Franconia as the son of Paul Stapf (1851–1917), a merchant in Kitzingen, and his wife Blandine Barbara, née Meyer (1855–1934). After receiving his Abitur from the Altes Gymnasium in Würzburg, Stapf entered the Bavarian Army as a Fahnenjunker (officer candidate) on 1 August 1910 and was commissioned as a Leutnant (lieutenant) in the 22nd Bavarian Infantry Regiment (Königlich Bayerisches 22. Infanterie-Regiment Fürst Wilhelm von Hohenzollern) on 28 October 1912. He served with this regiment in World War I and was promoted to Oberleutnant on 14 January 1916. On 28 June 1918 he was named Adjutant of the 21st Bavarian Infantry Brigade, where he served until the end of the war.

=== Interwar period ===
After the end of World War I, he was carried over in the Reichswehr, serving in various infantry and cavalry units and staff positions. He was provisionally promoted to captain on 1 July 1921 (later receiving a seniority date of 18 October 1918), to major on 1 February 1931 (with a seniority date of 1 April 1929) and to lieutenant colonel on 1 October 1933.

Stapf married Carin Fjellmann on 25 November 1923 in Munich. The couple had two sons and one daughter.

Stapf was in command of the 7. Kraftfahr-Abteilung in Munich when the Reichswehr became the Wehrmacht in 1935, but was soon promoted to colonel on 1 August 1935 and transferred as a section chief to the Army General Staff in Berlin in September. In February 1938, he was attached to Hermann Göring's staff as army liaison officer to the Luftwaffe staff. On 10 November 1938, he was named Oberquartiermeister III in the Army General Staff while remaining concurrently as liaison officer to the Luftwaffe. He was promoted to Generalmajor on 1 April 1939

=== World War II ===
Stapf was named commander of the 111th Infantry Division with effect from 5 November 1940 and promoted to Generalleutnant on 1 February 1941. He was briefly commanding general of the XXXXIV. Army Corps in January and February 1942, but was soon transferred to the army's leaders' reserve (Führerreserve).

In July 1942, Stapf was named chief of the Economic Staff East (Wirtschaftsstab Ost) under the Economic Organization East (Wirtschaftsorganisation Ost), whose task was the economic exploitation of the occupied eastern territories. Stapf headed the Economic Staff East until it was dissolved in the fall of 1944. On 1 October 1942, Stapf was promoted to General der Infanterie. With the reorganization of the German military economic organization in late 1944, Stapf became chief of the Field Economic Office (Feldwirtschaftsamt) of the Oberkommando der Wehrmacht on 15 October 1944, where he remained until the end of the war.

=== Post–WWII ===
After the war, Stapf worked with the United States Army Historical Division.

== Promotions ==
- 1 August 1910 Fahnenjunker (Officer Candidate)
- 27 September 1910 Fahnenjunker-Gefreiter (Officer Candidate with Lance Corporal rank)
- 26 October 1910 Fahnenjunker-Unteroffizier (Officer Candidate with Corporal/NCO/Junior Sergeant rank)
- 3 March 1911 Fähnrich (Officer Cadet)
- 28 October 1912 Leutnant (2nd Lieutenant)
  - 26 September 1919 received improved Patent from 28 October 1910 (8)
- 14 January 1916 Oberleutnant (1st Lieutenant)
- 28 September 1921 Rittmeister with effect from 1 July 1921
  - 1 February 1922 received Rank Seniority (RDA) from 18 October 1918 (9)
  - 1 October 1922 reclassified as Hauptmann (Captain)
- 1 February 1931 Major with RDA from 1 April 1929 (12a)
- 1 October 1933 Oberstleutnant (Lieutenant Colonel)
- 1 August 1935 Oberst (Colonel)
- 31 March 1939 Generalmajor (Major General) with effect and RDA from 1 April 1939 (6)
- 17 January 1941 Generalleutnant (Lieutenant General) with effect and RDA from 1 February 1941 (8)
- 16 October 1942 General der Infanterie (General of the Infantry) with effect and RDA from 1 October 1942 (1d)

== Awards and decorations ==
- Bavarian Prince Regent Luitpold Medal on the Ribbon of the Jubilee Medal of the Bavarian Army on 12 March 1911
- Iron Cross (1914), 2nd and 1st Class
  - 2nd Class on 16 September 1914
  - 1st Class on 21 January 1916
- Bavarian Military Merit Order, 4th Class with Swords on 29 April 1915
- Princely Hohenzollern Honor Cross, 3rd Class with Swords (HEK3X) on 15 July 1915
- Oldenburg Friedrich August Cross, 2nd and 1st Class on 15 December 1917
- Wound Badge (1918) in Black on 5 May 1918
- Crown to his Bavarian Military Merit Order 4th Class with Swords on 24 June 1918
- Honour Cross of the World War 1914/1918 with Swords on 29 December 1934
- Wehrmacht Long Service Award, 4th to 1st Class on 2 October 1936
- Spanish Cross of Military Merit, 3rd Class with White Decoration (Cruz blanca del Merito Militar de 3a clasa) on 12 April 1939
- Repetition Clasp 1939 to the Iron Cross 1914, 2nd and 1st Class
  - 2nd Class on 4 October 1939
  - 1st Class on 4 June 1940
- Knight's Cross of the Iron Cross on 31 August 1941 as Generalleutnant and Commander of 111. Infanterie-Division
- War Merit Cross (1939), 2nd and 1st Class with Swords
- Knight's Cross of the War Merit Cross with Swords on 10 September 1944 as General der Infanterie and Chef Wehrmachtwirtschaftstab Ost

Military offices
Preceded by None	Commander of the 111. Infanterie-Division; 5 November 1940 – 1 January 1942	Succeeded by General der Infanterie Hermann Recknagel
Preceded by General der Infanterie Friedrich Koch	Commander of the XXXXIV. Armeekorps; 1 January 1942 – 26 January 1942	Succeeded by General der Artillerie Maximilian de Angelis
