= 19th Infantry Division (Wehrmacht) =

- German: 19. Infanterie-Division
- Active: October 1934 – November 1940
- Country: Nazi Germany
- Branch: Army
- Type: Infantry
- Size: Division
- Engagements: World War II

The 19th Infantry Division was a formation of the German Wehrmacht during World War II.

== History ==
Originally formed 1 October 1934 as Artillerieführer VI in Hannover, the division was renamed 19. Infanterie-Division on 15 October 1935. Mobilized on 25 August 1939 the division participated in the Invasion of Poland and the Battle of France. After the French campaign, the division was reorganized as a tank division and on 1 November 1940 was renamed 19th Panzer Division.

== Commanders ==
The commanders of the division:

- General der Kavallerie Konrad von Goßler 1 October 1934 – 1 March 1938
- Generalleutnant Günther Schwantes 1 March 1938 – 1 February 1940
- Generalmajor Otto von Knobelsdorff 1 February 1940 – 1 November 1940
