= Christian Hansen (general) =

German general (1885–1972)

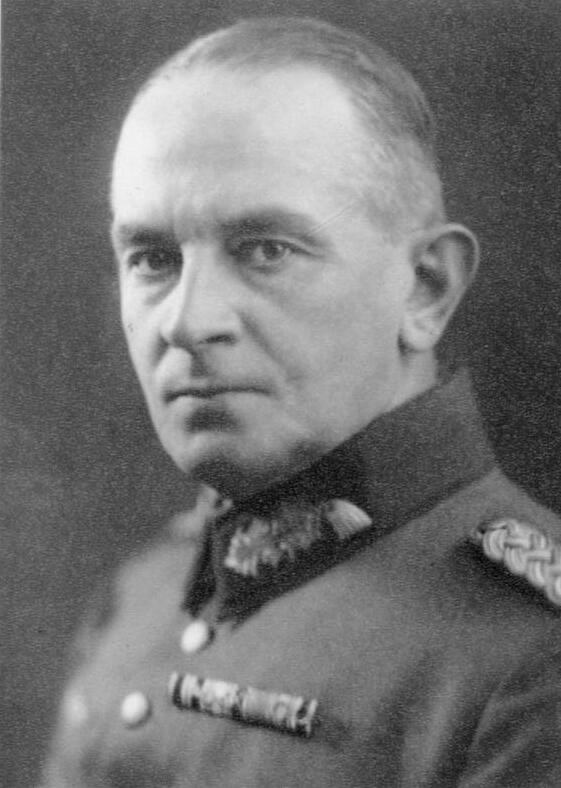
- Born: 10 April 1885; Schleswig, German Empire
- Died: 7 August 1972 (aged 87); Garmisch-Partenkirchen, West Germany
- Burial place: Garmisch Cemetery
- Military career
- Allegiance: German Empire; Weimar Republic; Nazi Germany
- Branch: German Army
- Service years: 1903–1944
- Rank: General der Artillerie
- Commands: 25th Infantry Division; X Army Corps; 16th Army
- Conflicts: World War I World War II
- Awards: Knight's Cross of the Iron Cross

Christian Hansen (10 April 1885 – 7 August 1972) was a German general in the Wehrmacht of Nazi Germany during World War II who commanded the 16th Army. He was a recipient of the Knight's Cross of the Iron Cross. Hansen retired from the Wehrmacht on 31 December 1944 on medical grounds. He died in 1972.

== Awards ==
- Knight's Cross of the Iron Cross on 3 August 1941 as General der Artillerie and commander of X. Armeekorps.

Military offices
Preceded by General der Infanterie Wilhelm Ulex	Commander of X. Armeekorps; 15 October 1939 – 30 April 1942	Succeeded by Generalleutnant Otto von Knobelsdorff
Preceded by Generalleutnant Otto von Knobelsdorff	Commander of X. Armeekorps; 1 June 1942 – 12 October 1943	Succeeded by Generalleutnant Otto Sponheimer
Preceded by Generalleutnant Otto Sponheimer	Commander of X. Armeekorps; 1 August 1943 – 4 November 1943	Succeeded by General der Infanterie Thomas-Emil von Wickede
Preceded by Generalfeldmarschall Ernst Busch	Commander of 16. Armee; 11 October 1943 – 1 July 1944	Succeeded by General der Infanterie Paul Laux
