= Kurt Schmidt =

German general

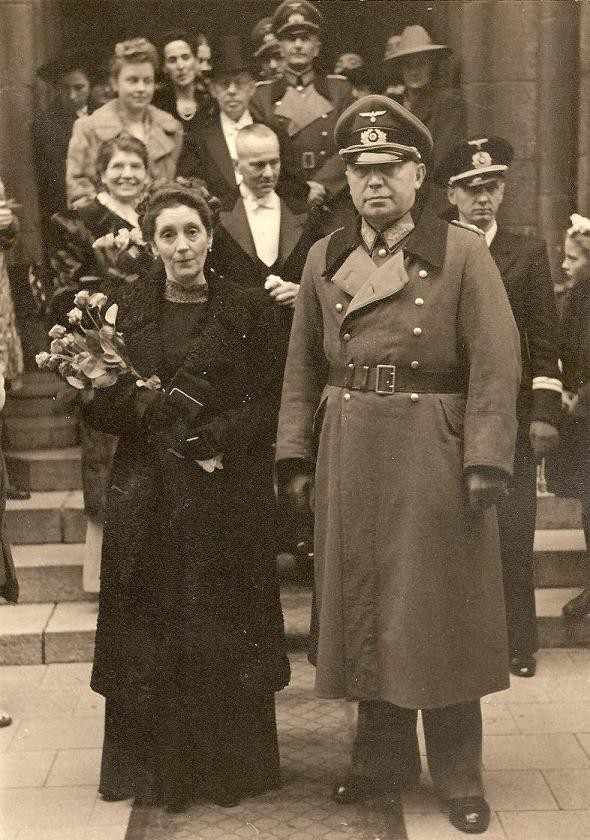
- Generalleutnant Schmidt and wife Dagmar on 10 April 1943 at the wedding of his oldest son Oberleutnant zur See; Günter Werner Helmut Schmidt (1919–1988).
- Born: Kurt Erich Heinrich Schmidt; 9 April 1891; Frankfurt am Main, Province of Hesse-Nassau, Kingdom of Prussia, German Empire
- Died: † 3 March 1945 (aged 53); Aalsmeer, Netherlands
- Burial place: Ysselsteyn German war cemetery, Netherlands (re-interred)
- Relatives: ∞ 22 October 1918 Dagmar Wendling; 3 sons
- Military career
- Allegiance: Kingdom of Prussia; German Empire; Weimar Republic; Nazi Germany
- Branch: Prussian Army; Imperial German Army; Reichsheer; German Army
- Service years: 1910–1945
- Rank: Generalleutnant
- Commands: 74th Infantry Regiment; Infantry Replacement Regiment 216; 702. Infanterie-Division; Division No. 526
- Conflicts: World War I World War II
- Awards: Iron Cross; War Merit Cross

Kurt Erich Heinrich Schmidt (9 April 1891 – 3 March 1945) was a German officer, finally Generalleutnant in Second World War.

== Life ==
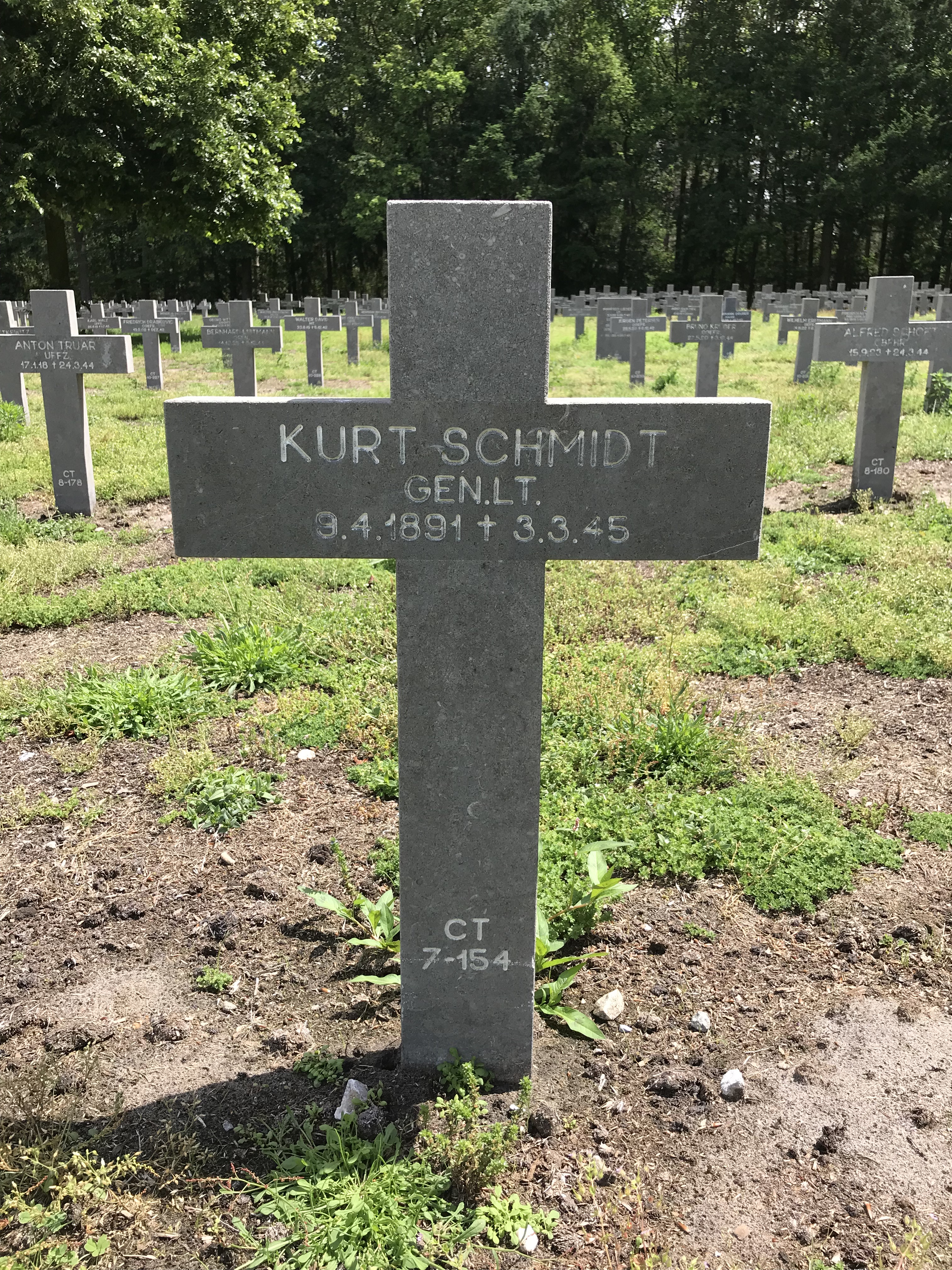

Kurt Schmidt was born in the German city of Frankfurt in 1891. He attended the Royal Prussian Cadet Corps in Naumburg and Groß-Lichterfelde near Berlin from Easter 1903 to February 1910. On 3 March 1910, he joined the Prussian Army and on 20 March 1911, he was promoted to Leutnant. He served in the 30th Infantry Regiment (the Infantry Regiment "Graf Werder"). Four years later, in 1915, he was promoted to Oberleutnant. Schmidt was wounded twice during the First World War, on 22 August 1914 and again on 29 October 1917. this time, a hand grenade had shattered his right leg. He returned to light duty at the end of February 1918, but never to the front again. He had received the Wound Badge in Black in 1918, but since it was later determined that this wound would significantly limit his military service in the future, he was awarded the Silver Wound Badge in 1924 in exchange for the black one. In the last months of the war, he had been promoted to Hauptmann (captain).

=== 1930s and World War II ===
Kurt Schmidt was a member of the staff of the 5th Infantry Division in 1930, in 1931 he was promoted to Major; in 1937 he was promoted to Oberst.

In 1937, the newly promoted Colonel Kurt Schmidt moved with his family to the German town of Hamelin. He was appointed commander of Infanterie-Regiment 74, subordinated to the 19. Infanterie-Division, on 12 October 1937. He was succeeded by Gustav Schmidt on 25 September 1939. On 24 October 1939, he was appointed commander of the Infantry Replacement Regiment 216.

On 6 May 1940, he was commanded to the Army High Command (OKH) and on 9 May 1940 was appointed Field Commandant 579. On 15 November 1940, he was appointed commandant of Luxembourg.

Schmidt was the commander of the 702nd Infantry Division in Norway from 4 September 1941 to 1 September 1943. During his time in Norway he was promoted to Generalleutnant, the highest rank he would hold. On 15 March 1944, he was appointed commander of the Division No. 526. With this division, he was then deployed in the Aachen area, the Rhineland-Palatinate, and the Netherlands. In September 1944, following the reorganization of his division, he was appointed commander of the new 526th Reserve Division. However, the formation was cancelled, and the units were distributed among front-line units. His staff was used as the command staff. In the autumn of 1944, the staff was then used, again as Division No. 526, within the 5th Panzer Army. From 10 December 1944, the staff, now known as Divisional Staff for Special Use (z. b. V.) 526, was deployed with the 1st Army in the West.

== Death ==
Generalleutnant Kurt Schmidt was killed in action on 3 March 1945 in Aalsmeer whilst commander of the Division No. 526. He was first buried at the Nieuwe Oosterbegraafplaats in Amsterdam but later re-interred at the Ysselsteyn German war cemetery.

== Promotions ==
- 3 March 1910 Fähnrich (Officer Cadet)
- 20 March 1911 Leutnant (2nd Lieutenant) with Patent from 24 June 1909 (21)
- 18 June 1915 Oberleutnant (1st Lieutenant)
- 20 June 1918 Hauptmann (Captain)
- 1 April 1931 Major (14)
- 1 September 1934 Oberstleutnant (Lieutenant Colonel) with Rank Seniority (RDA) from the same day (1)
- 16 March 1937 Oberst (Colonel) with effect and RDA from 1 March 1937 (5)
- 17 January 1941 Generalmajor (Major General) with effect and RDA from 1 February 1941 (1)
- 16 November 1942 Generalleutnant (Lieutenant General) with effect and RDA from 1 October 1942 (14)

== Awards and decorations ==
- Iron Cross (1914), 2nd and 1st Class
  - 2nd Class on 22 March 1915
  - 1st Class on 29 April 1919
- Hanseatic Cross of Hamburg (HH) on 7 March 1917
- Wound Badge (1918) in Black and Mattweiß (Silver)
  - Black in 1918
  - Silver on 29 January 1924
- Honour Cross of the World War 1914/1918 with Swords on 8 February 1935
- Hungarian World War Commemorative Medal with Swords and Helmet on 13 July 1935
- Wehrmacht Long Service Award, 4th to 1st Class on 2 October 1936
- War Merit Cross (1939), 2nd and 1st Class with Swords
  - 2nd Class on 10 February 1941
  - 1st Class on 1 September 1942

== Sources ==
- German Federal Archives: BArch PERS 6/911 and PERS 6/300822
