= X Army Corps (Wehrmacht) =

- X. Armeekorps
- Active: May 1935 – 8 May 1945
- Country: Nazi Germany
- Branch: Army
- Size: Corps
- Engagements: World War II: Invasion of Poland; Operation Barbarossa; Siege of Leningrad; Demyansk Pocket; Courland Pocket

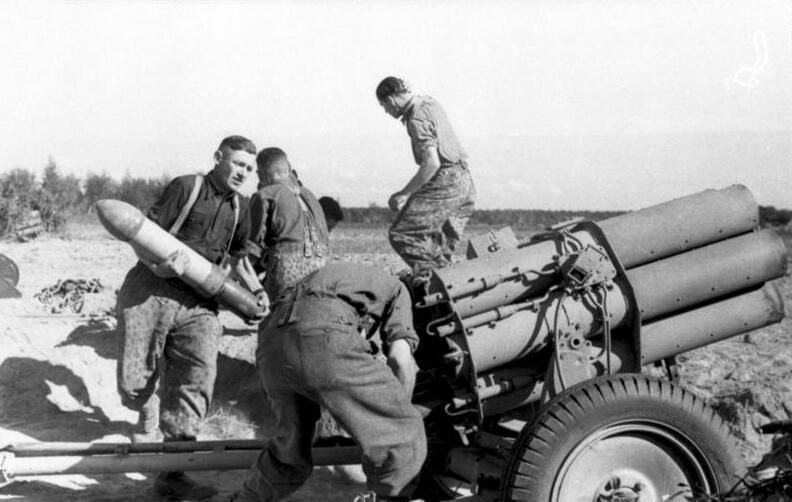

X Army Corps (X. Armeekorps) was a corps in the German Army during World War II. It was formed in mid-May 1935 from the Cavalry Division.

After the mobilization of 28 August 1939, the corps was deployed under General Wilhelm Ulex on the right wing of the 8th Army (commanded by General Blaskowitz) during the Polish campaign. After taking part in the Battle of the Bzura the corps was transferred to Warsaw. It later moved to western Europe and was eventually stationed in Normandy.

In April 1941 the corps was transferred to East Prussia to take part in Operation Barbarossa as part of the 16th Army in Army Group North. The invasion of Russia commenced on 22 June following.

In 1942 the corps was trapped in the Demyansk Pocket near Leningrad, surrounded by Soviet troops and cut off for several months from the rest of the army. They were supplied by air until German troops could break through to them.

After the lifting of the siege of Leningrad by Generals Govorov and Merezkow and the loss of Novgorod to the Soviet 59th Army in January 1944, the 16th Army was forced to retreat. Having retreated to Riga the corps came under the command of the 18th Army.

After the breakthrough of the Soviet 51st Army under General Kreiser on 10 October near Polangen on the Baltic Sea, X Corps, with the 11th, 30th, and 61st Infantry Divisions, took command of the southern front of the Courland Pocket. From October 27 to November 2, 1944, they withstood the main attack of the Soviet 5th Tank Army and sustained losses of more than 4,000 men. The German Army surrendered on May 8, 1945.

== Commanders ==
- Cavalry General (General der Kavallerie) Wilhelm Knochenhauer, May 1935 – June 1939
- Lieutenant-General Generalleutnant Erich Lüdke, 29. June – 26. August 1939
- Infantry General (General der Infanterie) Wilhelm Ulex, 26. August – October 1939
- Artillery General (General der Artillerie) Christian Hansen, 15. October 1939 – May 1942
- Tank general (General der Panzertruppe) Otto von Knobelsdorff, May – June 1942
- Artillery General (General der Artillerie) Christian Hansen, Juni 1942 bis 1. Juli 1943
- Lieutenant-General Generalleutnant Otto Sponheimer, 1. Juli – 31. July 1943 m.st.F.b.
- Artillery General (General der Artillerie) Christian Hansen, 1 August – 4 November 1943
- Infantry General (General der Infanterie) Thomas-Emil von Wickede, 4 November 1943 – 23 June 1944
- Infantry General (General der Infanterie) Friedrich Köchling, 25 June – 3 September 1944
- Infantry General (General der Infanterie) Hermann Foertsch, 21 September – 21 December 1944
- Lieutenant-General Generalleutnant Johannes Mayer, 21 – 27 December 1944
- Artillery General (General der Artillerie) Siegfried Thomaschki, 27 Dezember 1944 – May 1945

== Areas of Operation ==
- Poland : September 1939 – May 1940
- France : May 1940 – June 1941
- Eastern Front, North Sector : June 1941 – October 1944
- Courland Pocket : October 1944 – May 1945
