= II Army Corps (Wehrmacht) =

- II. Armeekorps
- Active: April 1935 – 8 May 1945
- Country: Nazi Germany
- Branch: Army
- Size: Corps
- Engagements: World War II

II Army Corps (II. Armeekorps) was a corps in the German Army during World War II.

== Organisation ==
Organisation of the corps at different times included;

=== 1939 (September) ===
- Corps Staff and Headquarters
  - 402nd Corps Signals Unit
  - 42nd Corps Propaganda Battalion
  - 402nd Corps Supply Troops
  - 402nd Field Gendarmerie Troop
- 3rd Infantry Division
- 32nd Infantry Division
- 2nd Artillery Command

=== 1940 (May) ===
- Corps Headquarters
  - 42nd Corps Signal Battalion
  - 402nd Corps Mapping Platoon
  - 402nd Courier Platoon
  - 402nd Field Post Platoon
  - 402nd Supply Battalion
  - 402nd Military Police Platoon
  - 1st Heavy Reconnaissance Flight, 11th Reconnaissance Squadron (attached from Luftwaffe)
  - 3rd Heavy Reconnaissance Flight, 21st Reconnaissance Squadron (attached from Luftwaffe)
  - 1st Battalion, 13th Anti-Aircraft Regiment (attached from Luftwaffe)
  - 86th Light Anti-Aircraft Battalion (attached from Luftwaffe)
- 7th Panzer Division
- 12th Infantry Division
- 32nd Infantry Division
- 263rd Infantry Division
- 525th Heavy Anti-Tank Battalion
- 2nd Artillery Command
  - 501st Artillery Headquarters
  - 32nd Artillery Survey Battalion
  - 2nd Battalion, 38th Heavy Artillery Regiment
  - 2nd Battalion, 39th Heavy Artillery Regiment
  - 436th Heavy Artillery Battalion
- 45th Engineer Battalion
- 45th Pontoon Engineer Column
- 178th Pontoon Engineer Column
- 1st Pontoon Engineer Column, 402nd Pontoon Regiment
- 2nd Pontoon Engineer Column, 402nd Pontoon Regiment
- 656th Pontoon Engineer Column
- 580th Road Construction Battalion
- 622nd Light Road Construction Battalion

=== 1942 (June) ===
- Corps Headquarters
  - 42nd Corps Signal Battalion
  - 402nd Corps Mapping Platoon
  - 402nd Field Post Platoon
  - 402nd Corps Supply Battalion
  - 402nd Military Police Platoon
  - 1st Battalion, 13th Anti-Aircraft Regiment (attached from Luftwaffe)
  - 92nd Light Anti-Aircraft Battalion(attached from Luftwaffe)
  - 5th Field Luftwaffe Defence Unit
    - 2nd Battalion, 3rd Luftwaffe Jäger Regiment
    - 3rd Battalion, 3rd Luftwaffe Jäger Regiment
    - 4th Battalion, 5th Luftwaffe Jäger Regiment
- 12th Infantry Division
- 30th Infantry Division
- 32nd Infantry Division
- 123rd Infantry Division
- 290th Infantry Division
- SS Division Totenkopf

== Commanders ==
- Generalleutnant Fedor von Bock, creation – April 1935
- General der Infanterie Johannes Blaskowitz, April 1935 – 10 November 1938
- Generaloberst Adolf Strauß, 10 November 1938 – 30 May 1940
- General der Infanterie Carl-Heinrich von Stülpnagel, 30 May 1940 – 21 June 1940
- General der Infanterie Walter Graf von Brockdorff-Ahlefeldt, 21 June 1940 – May 1942
- General der Panzertruppe Otto von Knobelsdorff, June 1942 – 1 July 1942
- General der Infanterie Walter Graf von Brockdorff-Ahlefeldt, 1 July 1942 – 28 November 1942
- General der Infanterie Paul Laux, 28 November 1943 – 1 April 1944
- Generalleutnant Wilhelm Hasse, 1 April 1944 – 5 May 1944
- Generalleutnant Kurt von Tippelskirch, 5 May 1944 – 11 May 1944
- General der Infanterie Paul Laux, 11 May 1944 – 3 July 1944
- General der Infanterie Wilhelm Hasse, 15 July 1944 – 15 January 1945
- General der Infanterie Dr. Johannes Mayer, 15 January 1945 – 1 April 1945
- Generalleutnant Alfred Gause 1 April 1945 – German capitulation

== Area of operations ==
- Poland - September 1939 to May 1940
- France - May 1940 to June 1941
- Eastern Front, Northern Sector - June 1941 to October 1944
- Courland Pocket - October 1944 to May 1945

== See also ==
- List of German corps in World War II
