= American airborne landings in Normandy order of battle =

The American airborne landings in Normandy order of battle is a list of the units immediately available for combat on the Cotentin Peninsula between June 6, 1944, and June 15, 1944, during the American airborne landings in Normandy during World War II.

== American forces ==
Allied chain of command

Supreme Allied Commander: Gen. Dwight D. Eisenhower

21st Army Group: Gen. Sir Bernard Montgomery

U.S. First Army: Lt. Gen. Omar Bradley

U.S. VII Corps: Maj. Gen. J. Lawton Collins

=== VII Corps ===
==== 82nd Airborne Division ====

- 82nd Airborne Division: Major General Matthew Ridgway
  - 325th Glider Infantry Regiment: Col. Harry L. Lewis
    - 1st Battalion: Lt Col. R. Klemm Boyd
    - 2nd Battalion: Lt Col. John H. Swenson (WIA 11 June 44), Maj. Osmund A. Leahy, Maj. Roscoe Roy (KIA 15 June 44), Maj. Charles T. Major
    - 2nd Battalion, 401st Glider Infantry Regiment: Lt Col. Charles A. Carrell (Relieved 9 June 44), Maj. Arthur W. Gardner (KIA 14 June 44); Maj. Osmund Leahy
  - 505th Parachute Infantry Regiment: Col. William E. Ekman
    - 1st Battalion: Maj. Frederick C. A. Kellam (KIA 6 June 44), Lt Col. Mark J. Alexander
    - 2nd Battalion: Lt Col. Benjamin H. Vandervoort
    - 3rd Battalion: Lt Col. Edward C. Krause
  - 507th Parachute Infantry Regiment: Col. George V. Millet (POW 8 June 44), Lt Col Arthur A. Maloney, Col. Edson Raff
    - 1st Battalion: Lt Col. Edwin J. Ostberg
    - 2nd Battalion: Lt Col. Charles J. Timmes
    - 3rd Battalion: Lt Col. Arthur A. Maloney
  - 508th Parachute Infantry Regiment: Col. Roy E. Lindquist
    - 1st Battalion: Lt Col. Herbert F. Batcheller (KIA 7 June 44), Maj. Shields Warren
    - 2nd Battalion: Lt Col. Thomas J. B. Shanley
    - 3rd Battalion: Lt Col. Louis G. Mendez
  - 319th Glider Field Artillery Battalion: Lt Col. James C. Todd
  - 320th Glider Field Artillery Battalion: Lt Col. Paul E. Wright
  - 376th Parachute Field Artillery Battalion: Lt Col. Wilbur N. Griffith
  - 456th Parachute Field Artillery Battalion: Lt Col. Wagner J. d'Alessio
  - 80th Airborne Anti-Aircraft Battalion: Lt Col. Raymond E. Singleton
  - 307th Airborne Engineer Battalion: Lt Col. Robert S. Palmer (POW 6 June 44), Maj. Edwin A. Bedell
  - Pathfinder Group: Maj. Neal L. Roberts
- Attached:
  - 87th Armored Field Artillery Battalion: Lt Col. George F. Barber
  - 746th Tank Battalion: Lt Col. Clarence G. Hupfer
  - 899th Tank Destroyer Battalion:

==== 101st Airborne Division ====

- 101st Airborne Division: Major General Maxwell D. Taylor
  - 327th Glider Infantry Regiment: Col. George S. Wear (relieved 9 June 44) Col. Joseph H. Harper
    - 1st Battalion: Lt Col. Hartford T. Salee (WIA 10 June 44)
    - 2nd Battalion: Lt Col. Thomas J. Rouzie
    - 1st Battalion, 401st Glider Infantry Regiment: Lt Col. Ray C. Allen
  - 501st Parachute Infantry Regiment: Col. Howard R. Johnson
    - 1st Battalion: Lt Col. Robert C. Carroll (KIA 6 June 44), Lt Col. Harry W. O. Kinnard
    - 2nd Battalion: Lt Col. Robert A. Ballard
    - 3rd Battalion: Lt Col. Julian J. Ewell
  - 502nd Parachute Infantry Regiment: Col. George Van Horn Moseley, Jr. (WIA 6 June 44), Lt Col. John H. Michaelis
    - 1st Battalion: Lt Col. Patrick F. Cassidy
    - 2nd Battalion: Lt Col. Steve A. Chappuis
    - 3rd Battalion: Lt Col. Robert G. Cole
  - 506th Parachute Infantry Regiment: Col. Robert Sink
    - 1st Battalion: Lt Col. William L. Turner (KIA 7 June 44), Lt Col. James L. LaPrade
    - 2nd Battalion: Lt Col. Robert L. Strayer
    - 3rd Battalion: Lt. Col. Robert Lee Wolverton (KIA 6 June 44), Maj. Oliver M. Horton
  - 321st Glider Field Artillery Battalion: Lt Col. Edward L. Carmichael
  - 377th Parachute Field Artillery Battalion: Lt Col. Benjamin Weisberg
  - 907th Glider Field Artillery Battalion: Lt Col. Clarence F. Nelson
  - 81st Airborne Anti-Aircraft Battalion: Maj. X. B. Cox, Jr.
  - 326th Airborne Engineer Battalion: Lt Col. John C. Pappas (KIA 13 June 44)
  - 101st Pathfinder Company (Provisional): Capt. Frank L. Lillyman
- Attached:
  - 65th Armored Field Artillery Battalion: Lt Col. Edward A. Bailey
  - 70th Tank Battalion: Lt Col. John C. Welborn

=== IX Troop Carrier Command ===
Maj. Gen. Paul L. Williams (Grantham, Lincs)

- Command Pathfinder School: Lt.Col. Joel E. Crouch, commandant (RAF North Witham)
  - 1st Pathfinder Group (Provisional)

==== 50th Troop Carrier Wing ====
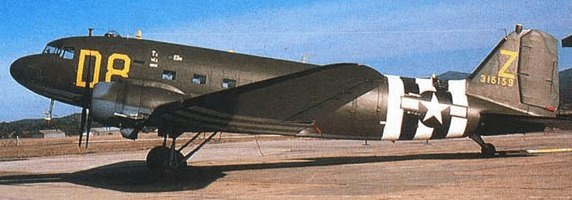
C-47 of the 439th Troop Carrier Group, which carried the 506th PIR (of Band of Brothers fame) into Normandy. Group commander's aircraft, chalk #1 of Serial 11

Brig. Gen. Julian M. Chappell at RAF Exeter

- 439th Troop Carrier Group: Lt Col. Charles H. Young (RAF Upottery)
  - 91st TCS: Maj. Howard U. Morton
  - 92nd TCS: Maj. Cecil E. Petty
  - 93rd TCS: Maj. Robert A. Barrere
  - 94th TCS: Maj. Joseph A. Beck II
- 440th Troop Carrier Group: Lt Col. Frank X. Krebs (RAF Exeter)
  - 95th TCS: Maj. Irvin G. Anderson
  - 96th TCS: Capt. William R. Cooper
  - 97th TCS: Maj. Jack S. Southard
  - 98th TCS: Maj. Bascome L. Neal
- 441st Troop Carrier Group: Lt Col. Theodore G. Kershaw (RAF Merryfield)
  - 99th TCS: Lt Col. Walter T. Fletcher
  - 100th TCS: Capt. James T. Cousin
  - 301st TCS: Capt. Lloyd G. Neblett
  - 302nd TCS: Lt. Col. Frederick Funston, Jr.

==== 52nd Troop Carrier Wing ====
Brig. Gen. Harold L. Clark at RAF Cottesmore

- 61st Troop Carrier Group: Col. Willis W. Mitchell (RAF Barkston Heath)
  - 14th TCS: Maj. Lewis S. Frederick, Jr.
  - 15th TCS: Maj. Lawrence C. McMurtry
  - 53rd TCS: Maj. Howard M. Betts
  - 59th TCS: Maj. Marcus O. Owens, Jr.
- 313th Troop Carrier Group: Col. James J. Roberts, Jr. (RAF Folkingham)
  - 29th TCS: Lt Col. Quinn M. Corley
  - 47th TCS: Maj. Paul W. Stephens
  - 48th TCS: Maj. Edgar F. Stovall, Jr.
  - 49th TCS: Lt Col. Frank J. Lumsden
- 314th Troop Carrier Group: Col. Clayton Stiles (RAF Saltby)
  - 32nd TCS: Maj. Halac G. Wilson
  - 50th TCS: Maj. Joseph H. McClure
  - 61st TCS: Maj. Campbell N. Smith
  - 62nd TCS: Maj. Arthur E. Tappan
- 315th Troop Carrier Group: Col. Hamish McLelland (RAF Spanhoe)
  - 34th TCS: Lt Col. Donald G. Dekin
  - 43rd TCS: Lt Col. Otto H. Peterson
  - 309th TCS: Lt Col. Smylie C. Stark
  - 310th TCS: Lt Col. Henry G. Hamby, Jr.
- 316th Troop Carrier Group: Col. Harvey A. Berger (RAF Cottesmore)
  - 36th TCS: Maj. James R. Roberts
  - 37th TCS: Maj. Leonard C. Fletcher
  - 44th TCS: Maj. Benjamin F. Kendig
  - 45th TCS: Maj. Mars Lewis
- 442d Troop Carrier Group: Lt Col. Charles M. Smith (RAF Fulbeck, attached from 50th TCW)
  - 303rd TCS: Maj. Robert O. Whittington
  - 304th TCS: Maj. Kenneth L. Glassburn
  - 305th TCS: Maj. John A. Crandell
  - 306th TCS: Maj. Royal S. Thompson

==== 53rd Troop Carrier Wing ====
Brig. Gen. Maurice M. Beach at RAF Greenham Common

- 434th Troop Carrier Group: Col. William B. Whitacre (RAF Aldermaston)
  - 71st TCS: Maj. Glenn E. W. Mann, Jr.
  - 72nd TCS: Maj. Frank W. Hansley
  - 73rd TCS: Maj. Terry G. Hutton
  - 74th TCS: Maj. Ralph L. Strean, Jr.
- 435th Troop Carrier Group: Col. Frank J. McNeese (RAF Welford)
  - 75th TCS: Maj. Lewis A. Curtis
  - 76th TCS: Lt Col. Robert C. Lewis
  - 77th TCS: Lt Col. Henry H. Osmer
  - 78th TCS: Lt Col. Bertil E. Hanson
- 436th Troop Carrier Group: Lt Col. Adriel N. Williams (RAF Membury)
  - 79th TCS: Maj. John D. Kreyssler
  - 80th TCS: Maj. Clarence L. Schmid
  - 81st TCS: Maj. David W. Brack
  - 82nd TCS: Capt. Robert G. Johns
  - 85th TCS: Capt. Lester L. Ferguson (temporary attachment from 437 TCG)
- 437th Troop Carrier Group: Col. Cedric E. Hudgens (RAF Ramsbury)
  - 83rd TCS: Capt. John White
  - 84th TCS: Capt. John M. Campbell
  - 86th TCS: Maj. Ralph E. Lehr
- 438th Troop Carrier Group: Lt Col. John M. Donalson (RAF Greenham Common)
  - 87th TCS: Lt Col. David E. Daniel
  - 88th TCS: Maj. Robert W. Gates
  - 89th TCS: Maj. Clement G. Richardson
  - 90th TCS: Maj. Howard I. Pawlowski

== German forces ==
German chain of command

Supreme Command West: Generalfeldmarschall Gerd von Rundstedt

Army Group B: Generalfeldmarschall Erwin Rommel

Seventh Army: Generaloberst Friedrich Dollman (died 28 June)

LXXXIV Corps: General der Artillerie Erich Marcks (KIA 12 June)

=== German 7th Army ===
Ensign 7.Armee

==== ArmeeReserve ====
- 91st Air Landing Division: Generalleutnant Wilhelm Falley
  - 1057 Grenadier-Regiment: Oberst Sylvester von Saldern (La Haye-du-Puits)
  - 1058 Grenadier-Regiment: Oberst Kurt Beigang (Saint-Cyr)
  - 191 Artillerie-Regiment: Oberstlautnant Heinrich Kiewitt (Les Carrières)
  - 91 Fusilier Battalion
  - 191 Mountain Flak Battalion
  - 191 Panzerjäger Company
- 6th Parachute Regiment: Oberstleutnant Friedrich von der Heydte (L'Hotellerie)
  - 1./6: Hauptmann Emil Priekschat (Mont-Castre)
  - 2./6: Hauptmann Rolf Mager (Lessay)
  - 3./6: Hauptmann Horst Trebes (Rougeval)

==== LXXXIV Corps ====
- 243rd Infantry Division: Genlt. Heinz Hellmich (KIA 17 June)
  - 920 Grenadier-Regiment: Oberst Bernhard Klosterkemper (Etoupeville)
  - 921 Grenadier-Regiment: Oberstleutnant Jacob Simon (Mauger)
  - 922 Grenadier-Regiment: Oberstleutnant Franz Müller (Haquets)
  - 243 Artillerie-Regiment: Oberst Eduard Hellwig (Le Vrétot)
  - 561st Ost Battalion (Russian): (Flamanville)
  - 206 Panzer Battalion: Major Ernst Wenk (Audenville)
  - 243 Panzerjäger Company: (La Commanderie)
- 709th Infantry Division: Genlt. Karl W. von Schlieben
  - 729 Grenadier-Regiment: Oberst Helmuth Rohrbach (Le Vicel)
  - 739 Grenadier-Regiment: Oberst Walter Köhn (Querqueville)
  - 919 Grenadier-Regiment: Oberstleutnant Günther Keil (Montebourg)
  - 1709 Artillerie-Regiment: Oberst Robert Reiter (Equeurdreville)
  - 649 Ost Battalion (Russian): (La Brasserie)
  - 795 Ost Battalion (Georgian): Hauptmann Stiller (Turqueville)
  - 709 Panzerjager Company: Hauptmann Willi Hümmerich (Le Catelet)
- 752 Grenadier-Regiment (zbV): Oberst Kessler (Gavray)
  - 635th Ost Battalion (Russian): (Donville-les-Bains)
  - 797th Ost Battalion (Georgian): hauptmann Peter Massberg (Gouville)
- Attached independent units:
  - Sturm Battalion AOK 7: Major Hugo Messerschmidt (Le Vicel)
  - 100th Panzer Replacement Battalion (100.Panzer Ersatz und Ausbildungs Abteilung): Major Bardtenschlager (Francquetot)
  - 101st Stellungswerfer Regiment: Major Rasner (Vasteville)
