= LXIX Army Corps =

German military grouping

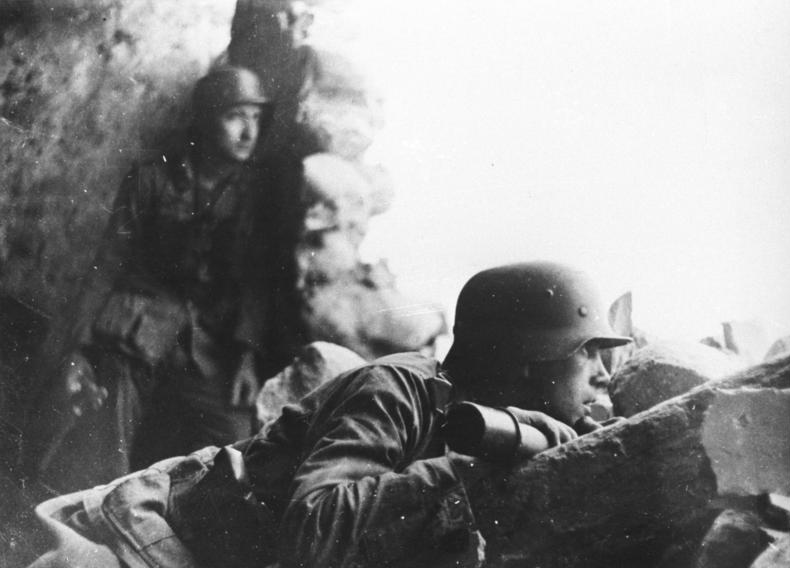
German soldiers in the Adriatic sector, October 1944

m The LXIX Army Corps (German: LXIX. Armeekorps), initially known as the LXIX Reserve Corps (German: LXIX. Reservekorps), was an army corps of the German Wehrmacht during World War II. The corps was initially formed in July 1943.

== History ==
The LXIX Reserve Corps was formed on 8 July 1943 for deployment in occupied Yugoslavia. It was deployed under the supervision of the German commander in Croatia (16 November 1942 to 24 August 1943: Rudolf Lüters), stationed in Banja Luka. The initial commander of the LXIX Reserve Corps was the Ernst Dehner.

The LXIX Reserve Corps was part of the 2nd Panzer Army under Army Group F between September 1943 and December 1944 and carried the name LXIX. Armeekorps after 20 January 1944. Dehner was succeeded as corps commander by Julius Ringel on 1 April 1944, who was in turn replaced by Helge Auleb on 24 June 1944. The corps then served in the reserves of Army Group F between January and March 1945 and then in the reserves of Army Group E until the end of the war in May 1945.

== Structure ==
Organizational chart of the LXIX (69th) Reserve Corps and the LXIX (69th) Army Corps of the German Wehrmacht, 1943 – 1945
| Year | Date | Commander | Subordinate units | Army | Army Group | Operational area |
|---|---|---|---|---|---|---|
| 1943 | 5 September | Ernst Dehner | 173rd Infantry, 187th Infantry | 2nd Panzer Army | Army Group F | Independent State of Croatia |
| 1943 | 4 October | Ernst Dehner | 1st Cossacks, 173rd Infantry, 187th Infantry | 2nd Panzer Army | Army Group F | Independent State of Croatia |
| 1943 | 8 November | Ernst Dehner | 1st Cossacks, 173rd Infantry, 187th Infantry | 2nd Panzer Army | Army Group F | Independent State of Croatia |
| 1943 | 3 December | Ernst Dehner | 173rd Infantry, 187th Infantry, 367th Infantry, 23rd SS Nederland | 2nd Panzer Army | Army Group F | Independent State of Croatia |
| 1944 | January | Ernst Dehner | Unknown | 2nd Panzer Army | Army Group F | Independent State of Croatia |
| 1944 | February | Ernst Dehner | Unknown | 2nd Panzer Army | Army Group F | Independent State of Croatia |
| 1944 | March | Ernst Dehner | Unknown | 2nd Panzer Army | Army Group F | Independent State of Croatia |
| 1944 | 15 April | Julius Ringel | Unknown | 2nd Panzer Army | Army Group F | Independent State of Croatia |
| 1944 | 17 May | Julius Ringel | 1st Cossacks | 2nd Panzer Army | Army Group F | Independent State of Croatia |
| 1944 | 17 June | Julius Ringel | 1st Cossacks, 373rd Croatian Infantry | 2nd Panzer Army | Army Group F | Independent State of Croatia |
| 1944 | 15 July | Helge Auleb | 1st Cossacks, 98th Infantry, 373rd Croatian Infantry | 2nd Panzer Army | Army Group F | Independent State of Croatia |
| 1944 | 31 August | Helge Auleb | 1st Cossacks | 2nd Panzer Army | Army Group F | Independent State of Croatia |
| 1944 | 16 September | Helge Auleb | 1st Cossacks | 2nd Panzer Army | Army Group F | Independent State of Croatia |
| 1944 | 13 October | Helge Auleb | 1st Cossacks | 2nd Panzer Army | Army Group F | Independent State of Croatia |
| 1944 | 5 November | Helge Auleb | 1st Cossacks | 2nd Panzer Army | Army Group F | Independent State of Croatia |
| 1944 | 26 November | Helge Auleb | 1st Cossacks | 2nd Panzer Army | Army Group F | Independent State of Croatia |
| 1945 | January | Helge Auleb | Unknown | directly under army group | Army Group F | Independent State of Croatia |
| 1945 | February | Helge Auleb | Unknown | directly under army group | Army Group F | Independent State of Croatia |
| 1945 | March | Helge Auleb | Unknown | directly under army group | Army Group F | Independent State of Croatia |
| 1945 | April | Helge Auleb | Unknown | directly under army group | Army Group E | Independent State of Croatia |
| 1945 | May | Helge Auleb | Unknown | directly under army group | Army Group E | Independent State of Croatia |

== Noteworthy individuals ==
- Ernst Dehner, corps commander of LXIX Reserve Corps and LXIX Army Corps (15 July 1943 – 1 April 1944).
- Julius Ringel, corps commander of LXIX Army Corps (1 April 1944 – 24 June 1944).
- Helge Auleb, corps commander of LXIX Army Corps (24 June 1944 – 8 May 1945).
