= Mark Alexander =

Mark Alexander may refer to:

- Mark Alexander (politician) (1792–1883), American lawyer
- Mark Alexander (cricketer) (born 1962), English cricketer
- Mark Alexander (keyboardist) (born 1963), pianist currently with the Neverland Express
- Mark Alexander (painter) (born 1966), British artist
- Mark J. Alexander (1911–2004), U.S. Army officer and paratrooper during World War II
- Mark C. Alexander, New Jersey law professor and advisor to Barack Obama's first presidential campaign

== See also ==
- Marc Alexander (disambiguation)
