= 325th Division =

325th Division may refer to:

- 325th Infantry Division (Wehrmacht), Germany, 1945
- 325th Security Division, Wehrmacht, Germany, 1942–1944
- 325th Rifle Division, Soviet Union
- 325th Air Division, United States
- 325th Division (Vietnam)

== See also ==
- List of military divisions by number
