= 243rd Static Infantry Division =

243rd (Static) Infantry Division
- 243. (bodenständige) Infanterie-Division
- Active: July 1943 – June 1944
- Country: Nazi Germany
- Branch: Army
- Type: Static infantry
- Role: Coastal Defence
- Size: Division
- Engagements: Invasion of Normandy

Commanders
- Notable commanders: Generalleutnant Heinz Hellmich

The 243rd Static Infantry Division was an infantry division of the German Army raised in July 1943. It was stationed in the Cotentin Peninsula when the Allies invaded in June 1944.

Generalleutnant Karl-Wilhelm von Schlieben, commander of the 709th Infantry Division reported that the commander of the 922nd Grenadier Regiment, Oberstleutnant Franz Müller, who had been assigned to the 243rd Infantry Division on the west coast, had been transferred by Generalleutnant Heinz Hellmich with regimental troops of the 922nd Grenadier Regiment, the 3rd Battalion 922nd Grenadier Regiment, and one Battalion of the 920th Grenadier Regiment, and the engineer battalion of the 243rd Infantry Division to Montebourg by night march on June 6. Regiment Müller was to advance south with its left wing along Saint-Floxel-Fontenay-sur-Mer-Ravenoville road. Von Schlieben did not remember the purpose of the mission, but assumed it was to prevent a widening of the enemy bridgehead to the north and to support the left flank of the 1058th Grenadier Regiment which engaged in a counterattack at Ste-Mere-Eglise on June 7. An attack by Regiment Müller was prevented from making progress by heavy naval gunfire.

Oberstleutnant Günther Keil reported events slightly differently. He said Oberstleutnant Müller arrived on the evening of June 6 in the area north of Azeville-Saint-Marcouf with regimental troops of the 922nd Grenadier Regiment, the engineer battalion of the 243rd Infantry Division, and the 1st and 3rd Battalions of the 922nd Grenadier Regiment (not a battalion from the 920th Grenadier Regiment). He goes on to add that on the morning of June 7 Regiment Müller attacked, the 3rd Battalion 922nd Grenadier Regiment on the left wing operating against Saint-Marcouf. Saint-Marcouf was captured, but under the pressure of heavy fire from enemy ship based artillery had to give up the position. Making connection with the 3rd Battalion 739th Grenadier Regiment, Oberstleutnant Müller then entrenched with his front facing south. That evening, the 3rd Battalion 922nd Grenadier Regiment along with the 3rd Battalion 739th Grenadier Regiment under command of Oberstleutnant Müller were subordinated to Oberstleutnant Keil. Oberstleutnant Müller took over the southern front adjacent to Oberst Helmuth Rohrbach's taskforce with the boundary being the western edge of the park of Fontenay. This position was maintained until the evening of June 12, when the units withdrew under orders of General der Artillerie Erich Marcks.

Generalleutnant Hellmich also dispatched the 3rd Battalion of the 243rd Artillery Regiment (less the 10th Battery) from the west coast via Bricquebec to Valognes. The two batteries took up position during the fight of June 6 near Ecausseville (3.5 km south of Montebourg). They were assigned to Regimental Staff Seidel and supported the attack of the 1058th Grenadier Regiment on June 7. The 3rd Battalion of the 243rd Artillery Regiment remained with the defending forces around Montebourg after the failed attack of the 1058th Grenadier Regiment.

The division was destroyed in the Battle of Normandy, with its last elements lost in the fall of Cherbourg.

== Commanders ==
- Generalmajor Hermann von Witzleben (August 1943 - 10 January 1944)
- Generalleutnant Heinz Hellmich ( 10 January 1944 - 17 June 1944) - KIA
- Generalmajor Bernhard Klosterkemper (17 June 1944 - 26 September 1944) - unit destroyed

== Order of Battle on D-Day ==
- 920 Grenadier Regiment (Oberst Bernhard Klosterkemper)
- 921 Grenadier Regiment (Oberstleutnant Jacob Simon)
- 922 Grenadier Regiment (Oberstleutnant Franz Müller)
- 243 Artillery Regiment (Oberst Eduard Hellwig)
- 561 Ost Battalion (Russian)
- 206 Panzer Battalion (Major Ernst Wenk)
- 243 Panzerjäger Company

== See also ==
- Order of battle for the American airborne landings in Normandy
