= Franz Mattenklott =

Military officer of World War II

- Born: 19 November 1884; Grünberg, Province of Silesia, German Empire
- Died: 28 June 1954 (aged 69); Braunlage, West Germany
- Military career
- Allegiance: German Empire; Weimar Republic; Nazi Germany
- Branch: Army (Wehrmacht)
- Service years: 1903–1945
- Rank: General of the Infantry
- Commands: 72nd Infantry Division, XXXXII Army Corps, Stellvertretendes Generalkommando VI. Armeekorps
- Conflicts: World War I World War II: Battle of France; Balkan Campaign; Operation Barbarossa; Siege of Sevastopol (1941–42); Battle of the Kerch Peninsula; Ruhr Pocket
- Awards: Knight's Cross of the Iron Cross

Franz Friedrich Hugo Mattenklott (19 November 1884 – 28 June 1954) was a German general in the Wehrmacht of Nazi Germany during World War II. He was a recipient of the Knight's Cross of the Iron Cross.

Born in Silesia, Mattenklott became a military officer in 1903 and fought in World War I. He remained in the downsized army of the Weimar Republic after the war, and by the start of World War II he was already a Generalmajor (Major General). He saw only limited involvement in the Battle of France in 1940, but his units played a decisive role during the German invasion of Greece in 1941 and, later the same year, during the Siege of Sevastopol and other operations in the Crimea. He was appointed as military district commander in mid–1944, and faced the Western allies during the final battles of the war in the spring of 1945.

Although implicated in war crimes in both the Eastern and Western Fronts during World War II, Mattenklott was never convicted of any wrongdoing, dying a free man in the summer of 1954.

== Early years and World War I ==
Franz Mattenklott was born on 19 November 1884 in Grünberg, a city in the Prussian Province of Silesia to Dietrich Mattenklott and his wife Elfriede, née Duttenhöfer. His father was director of a sugar factory in Ober Pritschen in Silesia, estate owner and a retired captain of the Prussian Army.

After completing his high–school studies, Franz Mattenklott applied to enter an infantry regiment in Metz, Alsace-Lorraine, then part of the German Empire. After successfully taking a written examination, Mattenklott entered service in the Prussian Army as an officer candidate on 28 December 1903. He received his commission as an officer in 1905. By 1912 he had advanced to the position of Adjutant of the regiment's 1st Battalion. Mattenklott served during World War I as a captain.

== Interwar period ==
After the capitulation of the German Empire, Mattenklott was retained in the Reichsheer of the Weimar Republic. He continued to rise in the ranks of the Reichswehr, being promoted to Major in 1928. His next position was that of an instructor at the Infantry School in Dresden. In 1932, he rose to the rank of Oberstleutnant.

Adolf Hitler's rise to power in 1933 marked the end of the Weimar Republic. The following years, disregarding the confining Versailles Treaty, the Nazi regime intensified the German re-armament (Aufrüstung) and increased the size of the military. As part of this process, Mattenklott received the command of the newly formed Infantry Regiment Stargard on 1 October 1934 and he was promoted to Oberst (Colonel) on the same day.

Mattenklott finally entered the general officers' ranks at the age of 53, with his promotion to Generalmajor (Major General) on 1 March 1938. His new position was at the west part of the Third Reich: on 1 July 1938, he was appointed commander of the Border Command Trier (Grenz–Kommandantur Trier). He was still in this post when Nazi Germany invaded Poland on 1 September 1939, marking the start of World War II in Europe.

== World War II ==
=== France ===
Upon the war's outbreak, most of the German army forces were fighting in Poland, but since the Western Allies had declared war on Nazi Germany, its western borders were vulnerable. Part of the critical task of border guarding was given to Mattenklott, who had three regiments — two infantry and one artillery — at his disposal to defend the border with Luxembourg and the adjacent part with France's.

A few weeks later, on 19 September 1939, the units under his command were reorganized as the 72nd Infantry Division, with headquarters at Koblenz. Given its primary assignment, it is understandable that the division was not considered first priority, and as a consequence, it consisted of units of rather inferior fighting value. The following months, it remained on duty on the Western Front during the Phoney War. It didn't face the dreaded attack from the Western Allies, apart from some minor, light engagements. A few months before the German attack on France, in February 1940, Mattenklott was promoted to Generalleutnant (Lieutenant General).

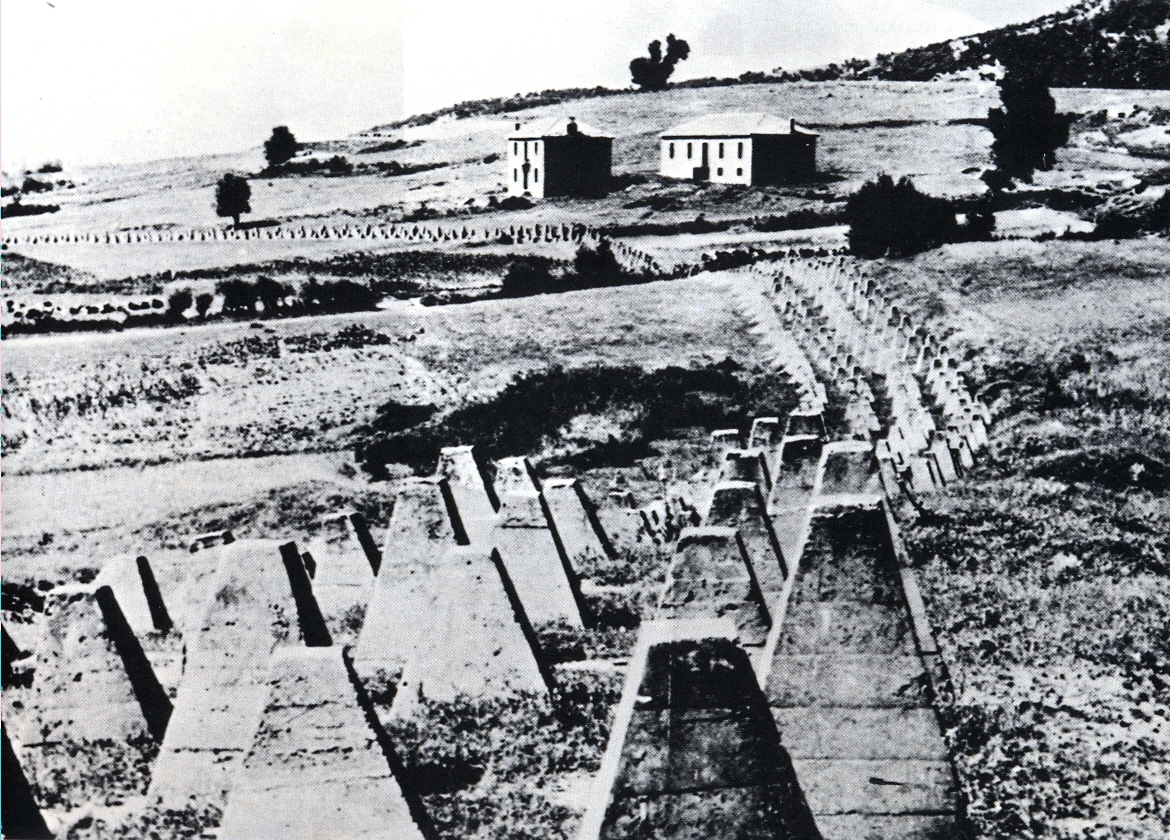
A view of anti–tank defenses (dragon's teeth) in Metaxas Line

Mattenklott's units had a limited participation in the Battle of France in May–June 1940. One of the division's veterans claimed after the war that his unit was ordered to attack French positions in a forest, allegedly manned by inferior units. Mattenklott supposedly forbade air support, resulting in operational failure, prompting the veteran to bluntly call Mattenklott "an idiot". It is generally accepted that Mattenklott's division performed mediocrely, even though it faced only light resistance. By June 1940, France capitulated, and the 72nd Infantry Division was posted in France as an occupational unit, while Mattenklott was named commander of Metz, Alsace-Lorraine, in July of that year.

=== Balkan campaign ===
After a brief period of refitting in France, the 72nd Infantry Division was deployed to Bulgaria, then a member of the Axis powers, in the spring of 1941, in order to take part in the planned invasion of Greece, or "Operation Marita" (Unternehmen Marita). The division was placed under XVIII Mountain Corps (XVIII. Gebirgskorps) of General der Infanterie Franz Böhme, part of Generalfeldmarschall (Field Marshal) Wilhelm List's 12th Army (Wehrmacht). All in all, Böhme's Corps consisted of four infantry divisions and a reinforced infantry regiment; this formidable force faced three Greek Divisions and the heavily fortified Metaxas Line along the mountainous region of the Greek–Bulgarian border.

Mattenklott's division was given the objective of breaking through the defenses southwest of Nevrokop, proceeding further to the southwest until Serres and then turn to the north and attack Fort Roupel from behind, in order to capture the vital national road crossing the narrow valley known as the Rupel Pass. The invasion began on 6 April, and until the night, Mattenklott's troops had failed to punch through the Metaxas Line, suffering heavy casualties. However, during the following day, a breakthrough was achieved, but the advance towards Serres was retarded by the mountainous terrain. Most of the Greek forts continued to resist until 9 April, but as the main forces were isolated by the German advance to the west, they finally capitulated on the same day. Suming up his experiences from the battle, Mattenklott praised the Greek Army for its firm resistance and bravery. Following these developments, the XVIII Mountain Corps advanced until Thessaly. Other units captured the rest of the country, which came under total occupation with the capture of Crete in June.

=== Invasion of the Soviet Union ===
At the time of the start of Operation Barbarossa on 22 June 1941, Mattenklott's division was in Romania; it was placed under 11th Army of Army Group South as a reserve formation. It fought initially near Nikolayev in Ukraine, then crossing the Dnieper River, a vital point which allowed the advance towards Crimea. Mattenklott led his units during the Crimean Campaign, reaching Sevastopol in late autumn. On 1 October 1941, he was promoted to General of the Infantry.

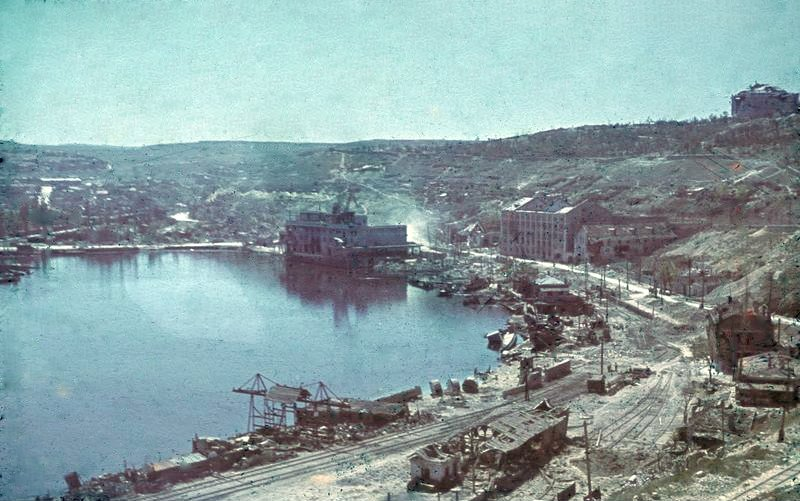
The destroyed port of Sevastopol after the city's capture by the Wehrmacht (July 1942)

For his leadership of the division during the siege of Sevastopol in the first half of November 1941, Mattenklott was awarded the Knight's Cross of the Iron Cross. While in Crimea, Mattenklott was confronted with the murder of Jews by special units, the Einsatzgruppen. When 400 Jewish men and 10 women were shot, ostensibly for acts of sabotage, Mattenklott "expressed his recognition and gratitude" to the responsible Einsatzgruppe D for the executions.

During the following months, the 11th Army, under the command of General der Infanterie (General of the Infantry) Erich von Manstein, continued to lay siege on encircled Sevastopol. A crisis ensued in late December 1941, when the Soviets launched an amphibious attack on the Kerch Straits and Feodosiya to retake Kerch and its peninsula, threatening to cut off Generalleutnant Hans von Sponeck's XLII Army Corps (XLII. or XXXXII. Armeekorps). Although Manstein had given explicit orders to Sponeck to hold his positions, while units from Sevastopol could arrive, Sponeck ordered his corps to retreat. Furious at this insubordination, Manstein relieved him of his command and replaced him with Mattenklott, who had just been given the command of XXX Army Corps. Mattenklott's units, along with XXX Army Corps, spent the next months in bitter fighting over eastern Crimea, managing to repulse Soviet attacks, suffering and inflicting heavy casualties.

In May 1942, Mattenklott led his corps throughout Operation Trappenjagd, an attempt to crush the soviet bridgeheads in Kerch peninsula. The Germans managed to encircle and destroy several Red Army units, killing or capturing about 175,000 soldiers to fewer than 3,500 casualties for XXX and XLII Army Corps.

After the ultimate capture of Crimea in July 1942, XLII Corps remained on duty on the peninsula, and Mattenklott was named commander of Crimea (Befehlshaber Krim) on 24 August 1942. Almost immediately, he became confronted with the problem of the nutrition of the population, as the callous policy of Manstein was to confiscate all raw materials to sustain the German troops. Mattenklott worried about the impact on the relations between the army and the civilians and wrote to the Army Group South in September, expressing the opinion that the German troops should not give promises to the population for ameliorating the situation if they were unable to keep them. Measures were not undertaken, however, and Crimea suffered food shortages and famines throughout 1942 and 1943. Under Mattenklott's command, hundreds of civilians were executed, including those accused, often wrongfully, as partisans, communists, invalids and the homeless, as well as numerous other groups labeled as "undesirable elements" by the Nazi world view. Among the perpetrators of these atrocities were also police units, with which Mattenklott reported to have "an excellent cooperation". Mattenklott was commander of Crimea until April 1943.

Mattenklott commanded the XLII corps during the battle of Kursk in July 1943, but his unit played only a marginal role in the Wehrmacht's last major offensive against the Red Army. In January 1944, Mattenklott temporarily ceded command of the Corps to the commander of 112. Infanterie-Division, Generalleutnant Theo-Helmut (Theobald) Lieb. The same month, the Red Army tried to encircle and destroy the XLII and XI Army Corps, together with Corps Detachment B (Korpsabteilung B), during the battle of the Korsun–Cherkassy Pocket. During the ensuing battles, the head of the anti-Nazi National Committee for a Free Germany, General der Artillerie Walther von Seydlitz-Kurzbach, unaware of his absence, appealed with letter to Matteklott and other commanders, urging them to surrender so he could halt the impending destruction. This proposal, however, fell on deaf ears. After weeks of hard fighting, the Germans achieved a breakout, and Mattenklott was summoned back to oversee the refitting of the corps and the transfer of the units in occupied Poland, away from the frontline. He was also commissioned with the drafting of an after-action report (Abschlussmeldung) and estimating the casualties. During the following months, the aging Mattenklott (by then 59 years of age) did not play any important military role, save for his role during the battles in Kovel in north-western Ukraine, where he aided German units to break free after they were encircled by the Soviet forces.

=== Late war ===
When General der Infanterie Gerhard Glokke, Commander of Military District VI (Wehrkreis VI) in Münster, Westphalia, died in office of a heart attack in early June 1944, Mattenklott was chosen to succeed him, with effect from 15 June 1944. In many respects, he was extremely lucky to have been transferred away from the Eastern Front. Exactly one week later, on 22 June 1944, the Soviet launched a large-scale offensive, Operation Bagration, which shattered the Wehrmacht units and paved the way for the drive into Germany.

Unbeknownst to Mattenklott, who apparently did not harbour any kind of anti-Nazi sentiments, some of his officers in the Wehrkreis VI were involved in the military resistance against Hitler. On 20 July 1944, after Colonel Claus von Stauffenberg detonated a bomb in Hitler's headquarters, the Wolf's Lair in East Prussia, the attempt to overthrow the Nazi regime (known as the 20th July plot) came in motion. Oberstleutnant Martin Bärtels, a conspirator in Mattenklott's staff, urged his superior to leave his headquarters and go on an inspection tour. However, the plot failed from the beginning in Münster. Soon thereafter, the commands from the conspirators' center in Berlin for the immediate arrest of the members of the Nazi apparatus in the Wehrkreis were signed from the retired Field Marshal (Generalfeldmarschall) Erwin von Witzleben. Still unsure of the situation, Matteknlott passively waited until information on the failure on Hitler's life and the coup reached him.

To what extent the failure of the plot and the brutal response against those involved in it affected Mattenklott's stance towards the evergrowing denialism showed by Hitler in view of Germany's impending defeat is not known. But as the Western Allies made their push in western Germany in the spring of 1945, Mattenklott followed the unrealistic orders of his superiors. By then, Mattenklott was leading the Wehrkreis units in a desperate defence of the area around Paderborn in North Rhine-Westphalia. On 1 April 1945 he reported to his superior, the Supreme Commander West (Oberbefehlshaber West), Generalfeldmarschall Albert Kesselring, that Paderborn was lost to the enemy after "it was defended to the last man"; he was committed in holding the Teutoburg Forest, but warned he was not able to deploy any significant forces.

A few days later, Mattenklott allegedly ordered the execution of Wilhelm Gräfer, the mayor of Lemgo, for treason, as he had tried to surrender the city to the US Army, in order to spare it from further destruction. Mattenklott himself surrendered to the Allies after some weeks.

== Post–war ==
During his captivity, Mattenklott wrote several historical manuscripts for the US Army, including a report on the battle of Kursk. During the post-war years, Mattenklott successfully avoided persecution and conviction for the war crimes he was involved in. As a subordinate of General Hans von Salmuth, he testified in the High Command Trial in 1948 as a defense witness for his former superior. His signature was found on an order dated 28 November 1941, considering "Antipartisan warfare" in occupied territories. Among others, the order suggested establishment of various concentration camps where hostages "[...] are to be shot and hanged [...], if attacks by partisans occur in the area concerned", and, additionally, issued that civilians or "dispersed soldiers" would be shot on sight if they were caught armed.

During his interrogation on 19 May 1947, Mattenklott claimed that such measures were "necessary and justified", but explained that he considered them to be of deterrent nature, as he stated that an execution of an armed civilian never came to his attention. He also told his interrogators that he had no knowledge of the systematic killing of Jews, Communists and other "undesirable elements" in the East, and categorically denied any involvement. Especially, he stressed that he knew "absolutely nothing" about the Holocaust. Only in the decades that followed did it became known that Mattenklott was fully aware of the Nazi policy of destruction and genocide in the Soviet Union, the activities of the Einsatzgruppen and that he often praised the "excellent cooperation" his units had with the perpetrators of these crimes.

Another possibility for Mattenklott's persecution came in the following years. The above-mentioned execution of mayor Gräfer in Lemgo had sparked enormous outrage, and the public demanded the punishment of those responsible. One of them, the Generalmajor a. D. (retired) Paul Goerbig, president of the court-martial that convicted Gräfer, was arrested in Hamburg in April 1949 and brought to Paderborn. There he claimed that Mattenklott was aware that Gräfer's execution could lead to a conviction, but told Goerbig that this case was "totally under control". Mattenklott admitted that he had sent the execution order to one of his divisional commanders, Generalmajor a. D. Karl Becher, who, in turn, ordered Goerbig to proceed. Although, in his own words, Mattenklott took responsibility for the order, he attempted to place all the blame on Becher, who was responsible for the establishment of the court martial. According to Goerbig, Becher denied that he had drafted any such order. Mattenklott's and Goerbig's accusations against Becher were deemed satisfying, but the case proceeded extremely slowly. The prosecutor never summoned Becher to testify, and in 1959, two years after Becher's death, all proceedings were halted.

By that time, however, Mattenklott was dead. He spent his final years in Braunlage, a health resort in the Harz Mountains in Lower Saxony. He died there on 28 June 1954 at the age of 69.

== Decorations and awards ==
- Knight's Cross of the Friedrich Order, 1st Class with Swords
- Knight's Cross of the Iron Cross on 23 November 1941 as General der Infanterie and commander of 72nd Infantry Division
- German Cross in Gold on 19 September 1942 as General der Infanterie and commanding general of the XXXXII. Army Corps

Military offices
Preceded by none	Commander of 72. Infanterie Division; 1 September 1939 — 25 July 1940	Succeeded by General der Infanterie Helge Auleb
Preceded by none	Commander of Festung Metz; 25 July 1940 — 4 September 1940	Succeeded by Generalleutnant Fritz Rossum
Preceded by General der Infanterie Helge Auleb	Commander of 72. Infanterie Division; 5 September 1940 — 6 November 1940	Succeeded by Generalleutnant Philipp Müller-Gebhard
Preceded by none	Befehlshaber Krim; 19 August 1942 — April 1943	Succeeded by General der Infanterie Helge Auleb
Preceded by Generalleutnant Hans Graf von Sponeck	Commander of XXXXII. Armeekorps; 1 January 1942 — 22 June 1943	Succeeded by General der Infanterie Anton Dostler
Preceded by General der Infanterie Anton Dostler	Commander of XXXXII. Armeekorps; July 1943 — 14 June 1944	Succeeded by General der Infanterie Hermann Recknagel
Preceded by none	Commander of Armeeabteilung Mattenklott; 14 November 1943 — 24 November 1943	Succeeded by none merged into XXXXII. Armeekorps
Preceded by General der Infanterie Gerhard Glokke	Stellvertretendes Generalkommando VI. Armeekorps; 14 June 1944 — April 1945	Succeeded by dissolved
