= Marc Alexander (disambiguation) =

Marc Alexander is a New Zealand politician.

Marc Alexander may also refer to:

- Marc Alexander (academic) (born 1983), linguist and academic
- Marc R. Alexander (born 1958), former Catholic priest

== See also ==
- Marc Alexandre (born 1959), French judoka
- Mark Alexander (disambiguation)
