= Hans Graf von Sponeck =

German general (1888–1944)

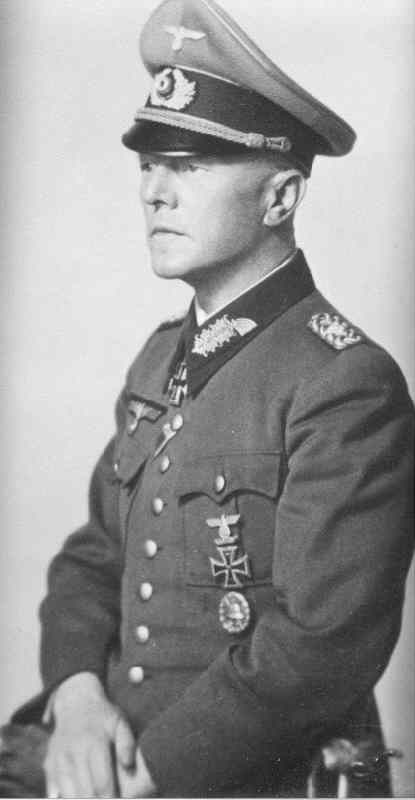
- Born: 12 February 1888; Düsseldorf, Rhine Province, Kingdom of Prussia, German Empire
- Died: 23 July 1944 (aged 56); Germersheim, Landkreis Germersheim, Rhenish Palatinate, Land Bayern, Gau Westmark, Nazi Germany
- Cause of death: Execution by firing squad
- Relatives: Hans von Sponeck (son)
- Military career
- Allegiance: German Empire; Weimar Republic; Nazi Germany
- Branch: German Army
- Rank: Generalleutnant
- Commands: XXXXII Army Corps
- Conflicts: World War I; World War II; Battle of the Netherlands; Battle for The Hague; Battle of France; Operation Barbarossa
- Awards: Knight's Cross of the Iron Cross

Hans Emil Otto Graf von Sponeck (12 February 1888 – 23 July 1944) was a German general during World War II who was imprisoned for disobeying orders and later executed.

== Pre-World War II career ==
Hans Graf von Sponeck was born in 1888 in Düsseldorf. He received a military education and was commissioned as an officer in 1908. He married in 1910 and had two sons by this marriage. He served in World War I as a battalion adjutant, regiment adjutant, company commander and general staff officer. He was wounded three times and in 1917 was promoted to the rank of Hauptmann (Captain). Afterwards he was awarded both orders of the Iron Cross with (oak) Leaves.

Between 1924 and 1934, he served on the General Staff HQ and later, as full colonel, commanded an infantry regiment at Neustrelitz. In 1925, Sponeck was admitted to the Order of Saint John (Bailiwick of Brandenburg) as a Knight of Honor (Ehrenritter).

Sponeck commanded Infantry Regiment 48 at Döberitz until late 1937 when he transferred to the Luftwaffe to establish paratrooper units. During the course of the Blomberg–Fritsch Affair, Sponeck was recalled by contemporaries as having suggested his willingness to lead his troops in support of army commander-in-chief Werner von Fritsch if called to do so, though no such plan ever came to fruition.

During the trial of General von Fritsch, Sponeck was called as a character witness but was roughly put down by Hermann Göring, who was serving as Court President. Nevertheless, Sponeck became commander of the 22nd Infantry Division with 42nd Army Corps training the troops as airborne infantry.

== Second World War ==
On 1 February 1940, Sponeck was promoted to Generalleutnant. The German airborne assault on the Low Countries began on 10 May 1940, led by Sponeck and General Kurt Student. Sponeck led the German troops in the failed Battle for The Hague and was almost captured, only to be saved by the bombardment of Rotterdam on the 14 May 1940 which quickly led to the Dutch capitulation. He was wounded, and on his return to Germany was further awarded the Knight's Cross of the Iron Cross by Adolf Hitler.

=== Invasion of the Soviet Union ===
Before dawn on 22 June 1941, Operation Barbarossa was launched beginning the German invasion of the Soviet Union. Sponeck commanded the 22nd Infantry Division as part of the 11th Army in the area of Army Group South attacking in the direction of the Crimean Peninsula. Two days before the invasion, on 20 June 1941, Sponeck's general staff gave orders to the division that any Jewish Red Army prisoners of war should be identified and separated from the rest of the Soviet prisoners. With the start of the invasion, Sponeck's division operated from the Romanian frontier driving into Bessarabia, and then to the southern Ukraine. In preparation for the invasion of Crimea, Sponeck's division was ordered in September and early October 1941 to attack east and north along the Sea of Azov to the cities of Henichesk, Melitopol and Berdiansk.

On 7 October 1941, Graf von Sponeck ordered his division to work closely with the Sicherheitspolizei (Security Police; SiPo) and Sicherheitsdienst (SD) by rounding up, identifying, and handing over Jewish civilians. Mass shootings of Jews by units of Einsatzgruppe D of the SiPo and SD are documented in both Henichesk and Melitopol shortly after these cities were occupied by the 22nd Infantry Division in October 1941. In Melitopol alone 2,000 Jewish men, women and children were massacred. In later British captivity at Trent Park, one of General von Sponeck's subordinate senior officers, Colonel (later General) Dietrich von Choltitz, admitted frankly in a surreptitiously recorded conversation that he had taken an active part in the work of killing Jews during the German invasion of the Soviet Union.

Because of sciatica and intestinal trouble, General von Sponeck took sick leave from his division on 14 October 1941. On Sponeck's return on 3 December 1941, Manstein gave him command of the XXXXII Army Corps (with command of the 46th Infantry Division), which had taken the Kerch Peninsula on the extreme eastern tip of Crimea. In Feodosia, within the area of Sponeck's command, 1,052 Jews were murdered on or around 10 December 1941 by units of Einsatzgruppe D with the active cooperation and participation of the local military field commander and military police. On 10 December 1941, General von Sponeck ordered that all Jews found within his area of command were to be treated in principle as "partisans", marked with the Star of David, and "deployed as labor." He also ordered that any Red Army soldiers captured, even those in uniform, were to be shot immediately and approved reprisal actions against civilians for any local anti-German activity or sabotage. Historian Erik Grimmer-Solem remarks:

The case of General von Sponeck is complicated. He had the moral courage to refuse an order from Hitler to stand his ground when his troops were threatened with destruction, and he was court-martialed and later killed by the Nazis for it. At the same time, he did not refuse to carry out the criminal Commissar Order, which gave cover for what became a genocidal war against ‘Jewish Bolshevism’ in the Soviet Union. While von Sponeck was not a Nazi in the technical sense and was himself even critical of some aspects of the regime, his orders and the actions of his troops leave no doubt that he had internalized anti-Semitic racism. Sponeck shows that it was not necessary to be an ideologically-driven Nazi to carry out the Nazi regime’s policy of mass murder. Under Nazism and in conditions of war, the lines between victim and perpetrator, between hero and follower could dissolve within a single person.”

On 26 December 1941, the Soviet forces landed on Kerch, and on 30 December executed another landing near Feodosiya with two armies. The operation was to drive to Sevastopol and relieve the garrison, now encircled by the German 11th Army. The 46th Division was the only division in a position to be able to block the Soviet advance. Manstein believed it could contain the landing, but the Soviets consolidated their bridgeheads and defeated the attacking Romanian brigades. As a result, Sponeck, as the XXXXII Corps commander, chose to withdraw the division from Kerch through the Parpach narrows to avoid being caught and encircled by Soviet forces advancing from the landing zones located at the extreme east (Kerch) and west (Feodosiya) of the peninsula. In doing so, he disobeyed direct orders from Hitler to hold his ground.

=== Trial, imprisonment and execution ===
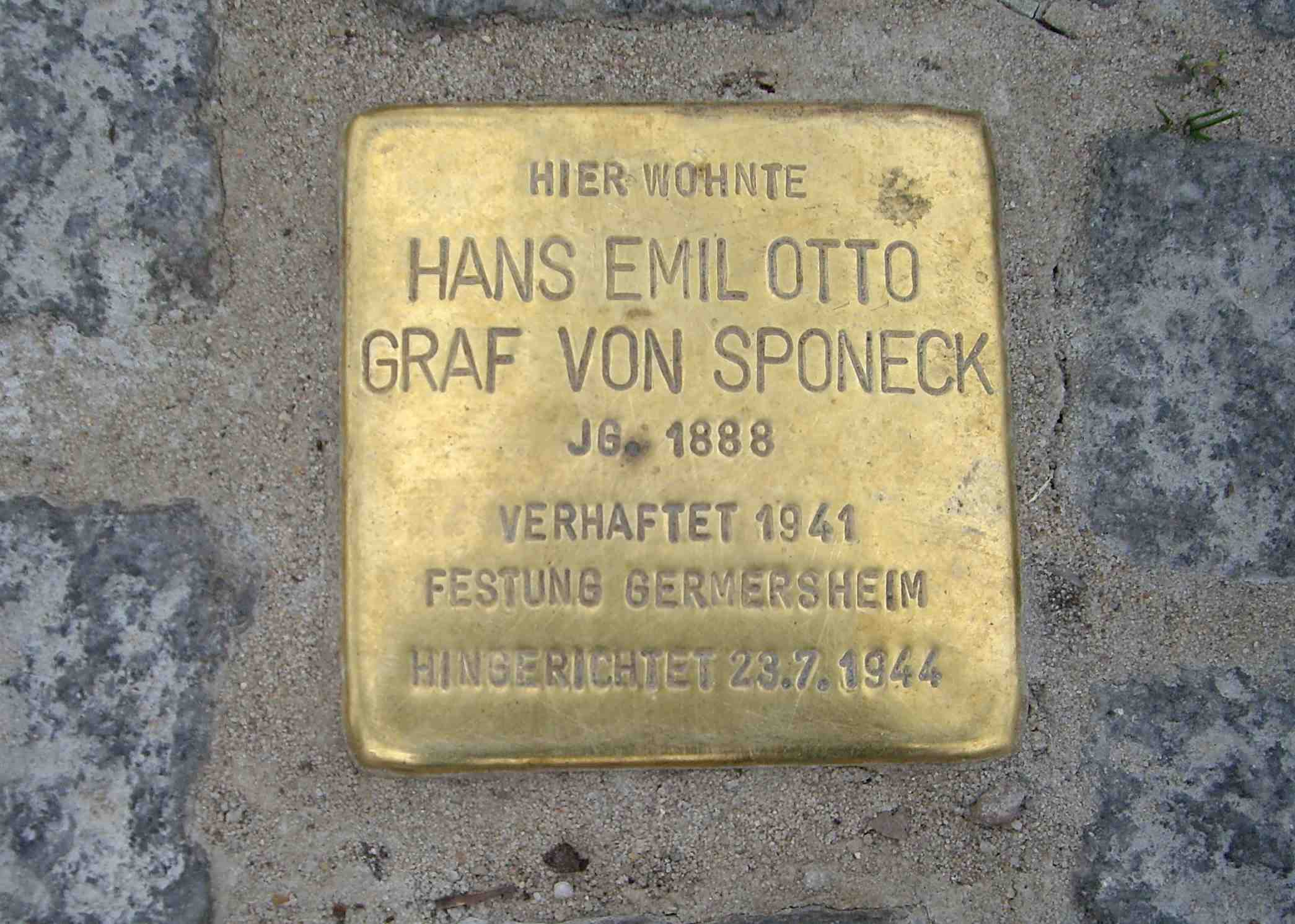
Memorial block in Bremen; removed in 2015 because of Sponeck's role in the Holocaust and other atrocities

On 23 January 1942, Sponeck was tried in front of the Court President Hermann Göring where he maintained that he had acted against orders, on his own initiative, in order to avoid the destruction of his division. He was found guilty of disobedience to a superior officer and given the death sentence. Adolf Hitler (on Manstein's proposal) commuted the sentence to seven years in prison. Sponeck was to serve as an example to those who disobeyed Hitler's new order not to retreat. Sponeck was imprisoned in the Germersheim Fortress.

Following the 20 July failed attempt to assassinate Hitler, Josef Bürckel, Gauleiter of Gau Westmark where Germersheim was located, pressed Heinrich Himmler, who was the Reich's Security Official, to have Sponeck executed in retribution for the assassination plot, even though the latter had no contact with the German military resistance. On Himmler's orders, Sponeck was shot to death on 23 July 1944. Sponeck was buried in Germersheim and no citations or speeches were permitted at his grave. After the war, Sponeck's remains were transferred to the Soldiers' Cemetery at Dahn in the Palatinate Forest.

After the war, Graf von Sponeck was commemorated in Germany, with an Air Force base in Germersheim, streets and monuments named after him. However, in 2015, following the publication of an article by Erik Grimmer-Solem in 2014 in the journal Militärgeschichtliche Zeitschrift, which investigated Sponeck's role in "numerous war crimes and crimes against humanity in the southern Ukraine and Crimea in 1941", civil protests in Germersheim took place. The German Air Force, in accordance with the German Government's and the Bundestag's decisions, renamed the Sponeck Airbase ("General-Hans-Graf-Sponeck-Kaserne") "Südpfalz-Kaserne".

== Notes ==
Military offices
Preceded by Generaloberst Adolf Strauß	Commander of 22. Infanterie-Division; 10 November 1938 – 10 October 1941	Succeeded by General der Infanterie Ludwig Wolff
Preceded by General der Pioniere Walter Kuntze	Commander of XXXXII. Armeekorps; 10 October 1941 – 29 October 1941	Succeeded by General der Infanterie Bruno Bieler
Preceded by General der Infanterie Bruno Bieler	Commander of XXXXII. Armeekorps; November 1941 – 31 December 1941	Succeeded by General der Infanterie Franz Mattenklott
