= LXXXVI Army Corps =

German World War II military unit

The LXXXVI Army Corps (German: LXXXVI. Armeekorps) was an army corps of the German Wehrmacht during World War II. It was formed in 1942 and existed until 1945.

== History ==
The LXXXVI Army Corps was formed on 19 November 1942 under the supervision of Oberbefehlshaber West (Army Group D). The corps was initially headquartered at Dax in southwestern France. The initial commander of the LXXXVI Army Corps was Bruno Bieler. The corps was put under the supervision of the 1st Army in December 1942.

After the Normandy landings of 6 June 1944, the LXXXVI Army Corps was called away from the defensive position in the southwest to help the defense of Normandy. The corps was assigned to the 5th Panzer Army under Army Group B. Subsequently, it was driven back by the Allied advance to the Lille area, where it served under the 15th Army in September. The LXXXVI Army Corps was successively driven back to the Venlo and the Lower Rhine regions, where it served under the 1st Parachute Army and again under the 5th Panzer Army.

The corps fought between December 1944 and May 1945 as part of the 1st Parachute Army under Army Group H in Northwest Germany. Its final commander before German surrender was Erich Straube.

== Structure ==
Organizational chart of the LXXXVI (86th) Wehrmacht Army Corps
Year	Date	Commander	Subordinate units	Army	Army Group	Operational area
1942	December	Bruno Bieler	None	None	Army Group D	Southwest France (Dax)
1943	1 January	Bruno Bieler	344th Infantry, 715th Infantry	1st Army	Army Group D	Southwest France (Dax)
1943	3 February	Bruno Bieler	344th Infantry, 715th Infantry, 18th LFD	1st Army	Army Group D	Southwest France (Dax)
1943	4 March	Bruno Bieler	344th Infantry, 715th Infantry, 18th LFD	1st Army	Army Group D	Southwest France (Dax)
1943	9 April	Erwin Jaenecke	344th Infantry, 715th Infantry	1st Army	Army Group D	Southwest France (Dax)
1943	1 May	Erwin Jaenecke	344th Infantry	1st Army	Army Group D	Southwest France (Dax)
1943	1 June	Erwin Jaenecke	344th Infantry	1st Army	Army Group D	Southwest France (Dax)
1943	7 July	Gustav Fehn	344th Infantry	1st Army	Army Group D	Southwest France (Dax)
1943	5 August	Gustav Fehn	344th Infantry	1st Army	Army Group D	Southwest France (Dax)
1943	5 September	Hans von Obstfelder	344th Infantry	1st Army	Army Group D	Southwest France (Dax)
1943	4 October	Hans von Obstfelder	344th Infantry	1st Army	Army Group D	Southwest France (Dax)
1943	8 November	Hans von Obstfelder	344th Infantry	1st Army	Army Group D	Southwest France (Dax)
1943	3 December	Hans von Obstfelder	344th Infantry	1st Army	Army Group D	Southwest France (Dax)
1944	1 January	Hans von Obstfelder	276th Infantry, 344th Infantry	1st Army	Army Group D	Southwest France (Dax)
1944	12 February	Hans von Obstfelder	2nd SS Panzer, 159th Infantry, 276th Infantry	1st Army	Army Group D	Southwest France (Dax)
1944	11 March	Hans von Obstfelder	2nd SS Panzer, 159th Infantry, 276th Infantry	1st Army	Army Group D	Southwest France (Dax)
1944	8 April	Hans von Obstfelder	159th Infantry, 276th Infantry	1st Army	Army Group D	Southwest France (Dax)
1944	11 May	Hans von Obstfelder	159th Infantry, 276th Infantry	1st Army	Army Group G	Southwest France (Dax)
1944	12 June	Hans von Obstfelder	159th Infantry, 276th Infantry	1st Army	Army Group G	Southwest France (Dax)
1944	15 July	Hans von Obstfelder	12th SS Panzer, 21st Panzer, 346th Infantry, 711th Infantry, 16th LFD	5th Panzer Army (Note: Before 5 August 1944: known as Panzergruppenkommando West.)	Army Group B	Normandy
1944	31 August	Hans von Obstfelder	346th Infantry, 711th Infantry	5th Panzer Army	Army Group B	Normandy
1944	16 September	Hans von Obstfelder	59th Infantry, 712th Infantry	15th Army	Army Group B	Lille
1944	13 October	Hans von Obstfelder	176th Infantry, 180th Infantry, Panzerbrigade 107	1st Parachute Army	Army Group B	Venlo / Lower Rhine
1944	5 November	Hans von Obstfelder	180th Infantry, 344th Infantry, Panzerbrigade 107, Erdmann	5th Panzer Army	Army Group B	Venlo / Lower Rhine
1944	26 November	Hans von Obstfelder	180th Infantry, 606th Infantry, 7th Parachute	1st Parachute Army	Army Group H	Venlo / Lower Rhine
1944	31 December	Erich Straube	84th Infantry, 180th Infantry, 190th Infantry	1st Parachute Army	Army Group H	Venlo / Lower Rhine
1945	19 February	Erich Straube	15th Infantry, 180th Infantry, 7th Parachute	1st Parachute Army	Army Group H	Venlo / Lower Rhine
1945	1 March	Erich Straube	190th Infantry	1st Parachute Army	Army Group H	Venlo / Lower Rhine
1945	12 April	Erich Straube	15th Infantry, 325th Infantry, 471st Infantry, Panzerverband Großdeutschland	1st Parachute Army	Oberbefehlshaber Nordwest	Ems / Weser

== Noteworthy individuals ==
- Bruno Bieler, corps commander of LXXXVI Army Corps (16 November 1942 – 1 April 1943).
- Erwin Jaenecke, corps commander of LXXXVI Army Corps (1 April 1943 – 3 June 1943).
- Gustav Fehn, corps commander of LXXXVI Army Corps (1 July 1943 – 25 August 1943).
- Hans von Obstfelder, corps commander of LXXXVI Army Corps (25 August 1943 – 30 November 1944).
- Carl Püchler, corps commander of LXXXVI Army Corps (30 November 1944 – 15 December 1944).
- Erich Straube, corps commander of LXXXVI Army Corps (15 December 1944 – May 1945).
