= Bruno Bieler =

German general (1888–1966)

- Born: 18 June 1888; Gumbinnen, East Prussia, German Empire
- Died: 22 March 1966 (aged 77); Dorfmark, West Germany
- Military career
- Allegiance: German Empire; Weimar Republic; Nazi Germany
- Branch: German Army
- Service years: 1907–1945
- Rank: General of the Infantry
- Commands: 73. Infanterie Division; XXXXII. Armeekorps; VI. Armeekorps; LXXXVI. Armeekorps
- Conflicts: World War I World War II
- Awards: Knight's Cross of the Iron Cross

Bruno Bieler (18 June 1888 – 22 March 1966) was a general in the Wehrmacht of Nazi Germany who commanded the XXXXII Army Corps during World War II. He was a recipient of the Knight's Cross of the Iron Cross.

== Awards and decorations ==
- Iron Cross (1914) 2nd Class (17 September 1914) & 1st Class (15 December 1914)
- Military Merit Order, 4th class with Swords (Bavaria, 20 April 1918)
- Hanseatic Cross of Hamburg (23 February 1918)
- Merit Cross for War Aid (Prussia, 4 November 1919)
- Silesian Eagle 2nd Class (1 September 1921) & 1st Class (30 September 1921)
- Honour Cross of the World War 1914/1918 (14 January 1935)
- Wehrmacht Long Service Award 1st Class (2 October 1936)
- Commander of the Order of the Sword (Sweden, 22 April 1938)
- Clasp to the Iron Cross (1939) 2nd Class (12 September 1939) & 1st Class (30 September 1939)
- Eastern Front Medal (15 July 1942)
- Crimea Shield (23 August 1942)
- Knight's Cross of the Iron Cross on 26 October 1941 as Generalleutnant and commander of 73. Infanterie Division
- German Cross in Gold on 20 November 1942 as General der Infanterie and commanding general of the VI. Armeekorps

Military offices
Preceded by General der Artillerie Friedrich von Rabenau	Commander of 73. Infanterie-Division; 29 September 1939 – 1 November 1941	Succeeded by General der Infanterie Rudolf von Bünau
Preceded by Generalleutnant Hans Graf von Sponeck	Commander of XXXXII. Armeekorps; 29 October 1941 – November 1941	Succeeded by Generalleutnant Hans Graf von Sponeck
Preceded by General der Pioniere Otto-Wilhelm Förster	Commander of VI. Armeekorps; 1 January 1942 – 31 October 1942	Succeeded by General der Infanterie Hans Jordan
Preceded by —	Commander of LXXXVI. Armeekorps; 19 November 1942 – 28 August 1943	Succeeded by General der Infanterie Hans von Obstfelder
