= Conrad-Oskar Heinrichs =

German General and Knight's Cross recipient (1890–1944)

Konrad-Oskar Heinrichs
- Born: 5 May 1890
- Died: 8 September 1944 (aged 54); Liège, Belgium
- Military career
- Allegiance: Nazi Germany
- Branch: Army (Wehrmacht)
- Rank: Generalleutnant
- Commands: 290th Infantry Division; 89th Infantry Division
- Conflicts: Allied advance from Paris to the Rhine †
- Awards: Knight's Cross of the Iron Cross

Konrad-Oskar Heinrichs (5 May 1890 – 8 September 1944) was a German general in the Wehrmacht who commanded several divisions. He was a recipient of the Knight's Cross of the Iron Cross. Heinrichs was killed on 8 September 1944 near Liège, Belgium.

== Awards and decorations ==
- Knight's Cross of the Iron Cross on 13 September 1941 as Oberst and commander of Infanterie-Regiment 24

Military offices
Preceded by Generalleutnant Theodor Freiherr von Wrede	Commander of 290. Infanterie-Division; 1 May 1942 – 1 February 1944	Succeeded by Generalmajor Gerhard Henke
Preceded by None	Commander of 89. Infanterie-Division; 10 February 1944 – 8 September 1944	Succeeded by Oberst Karl Rösler
