= 5th Mountain Division =

World War II German military unit

- German: 5. Gebirgs-Division
- Unit insignia
- Active: 1940–45
- Country: Nazi Germany
- Branch: German Army
- Type: Mountain infantry (Gebirgsjäger)
- Size: Division
- Garrison/HQ: Salzburg
- Engagements: World War II

Commanders
- Notable commanders: General Julius Ringel

The 5th Mountain Division (German: 5. Gebirgs-Division) was a mountain infantry (Gebirgsjäger) formation of the German Wehrmacht during World War II. It was established in the Wehrkreis XVIII in October 1940, out of units taken from the 1st Mountain Division and the 10th Infantry Division. The unit surrendered to the U.S. Army near Turin in May 1945.

== The Balkans ==
Following months of inactivity in Germany, the unit formed XVIII Mountain Corps with the 6th Mountain Division, and in spring 1941 was designated to take part in Operation Marita, the invasion of Greece, as part of the Balkans Campaign.

The unit then took part in the invasion of Crete, codenamed Operation Merkur. Here the unit was used in an air-landing role where it fought against British forces which had retreated from Greece. The units role in securing the islands was significant, and in November 1941, the unit returned to Germany for refitting.

== Eastern Front ==
In March 1942 it was deployed to the Eastern Front, where it joined Army Group North on the Volkhov Front, and took part in operations against the city of Leningrad. The unit remained on the Eastern Front until November 1943, during which time it was used primarily for firefighting for the 18th Armee in operations near Mga, Shlisselburg, and Kolpino.

== Italy ==
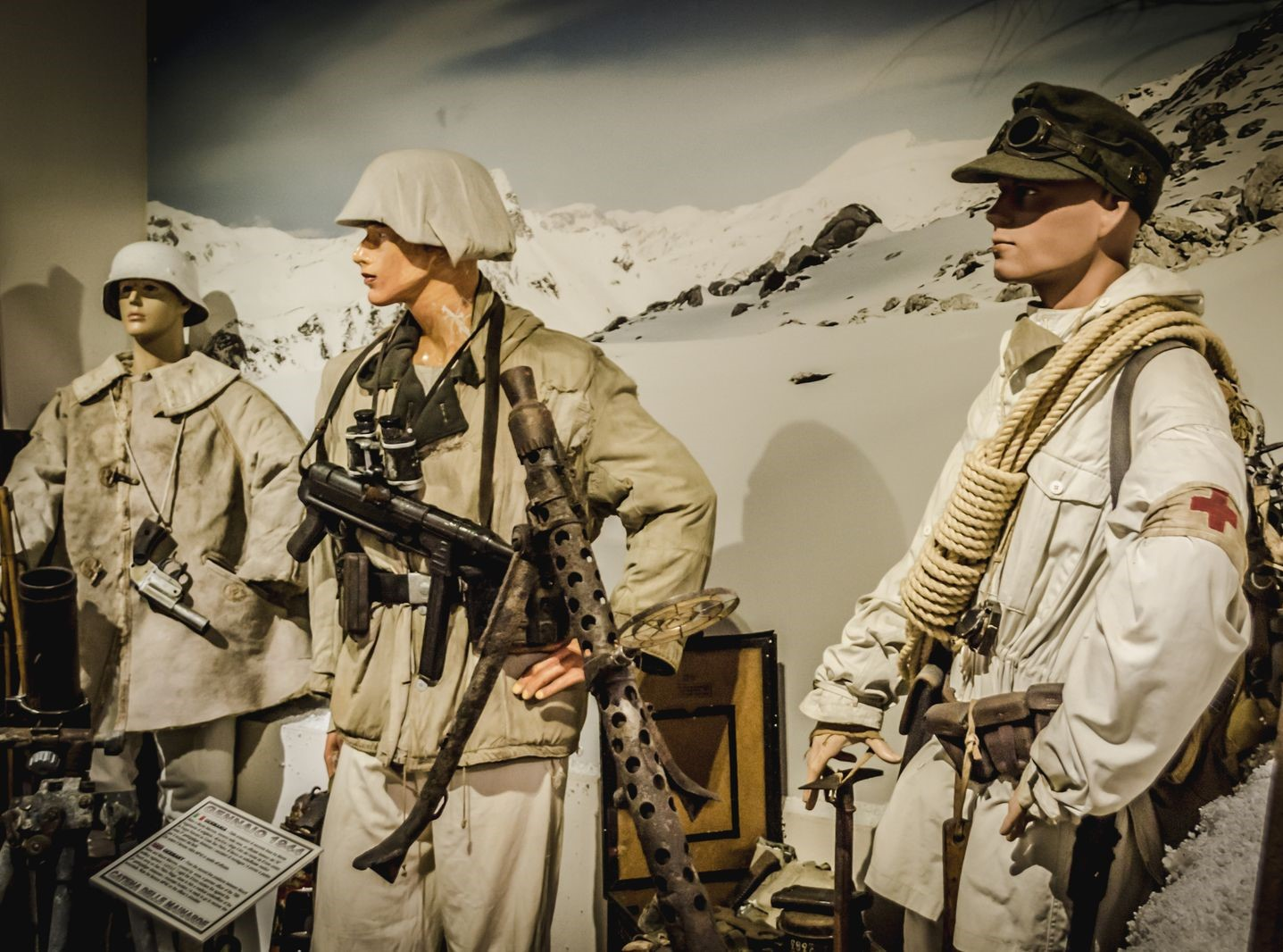
Representation of the 5th Gebirgsjäger in Venafro

Following its year on the Eastern Front the unit was redeployed to the Gustav Line in December 1943, arriving near Cassino. In January 1944 in particular they were heavily engaged against Arab troops of the French Expeditionary Corps, in the form of Goumier brigades and elements of the 2nd Moroccan and 3rd Algerian Divisions at the Battle of Monte Cassino. The unit fought out the remainder of the war in Italy and the Western Alps before surrendering to American forces near Turin in May 1945.

== War crimes ==
The division was implicated in the Grugliasco massacre, Piedmont, alongside the 34th Infantry Division, where, on 30 April 1945, 67 civilians were executed. Shortly after the division was also implicated in another massacre in the town of Santhià, on the way to Milan, resulting in 48 deaths.

== Commanders ==
- Julius Ringel (1 November 1940 – 10 February 1944)
- Max-Günther Schrank (10 February 1944 – 18 January 1945)
- Hans Steets (18 January 1945 – 2 May 1945)

== Order of battle ==
=== 1941 ===
- Gebirgsjäger-Regiment 85
- Gebirgsjäger-Regiment 100
- Gebirgsjäger-Artillerie-Regiment 95
- Gebirgs-Panzerjäger-Abteilung 95
- Gebirgs-Aufklarüng-Abteilung 95
- Gebirgs-Pionier-Abteilung 95
- Gebirgs-Nachrichten-Abteilung 95
- Gebirgs-Sanitäts-Abteilung 95
- Gebirgs-Feldersatz-Bataillon 95
