= Helge Auleb =

German general (1887–1964)

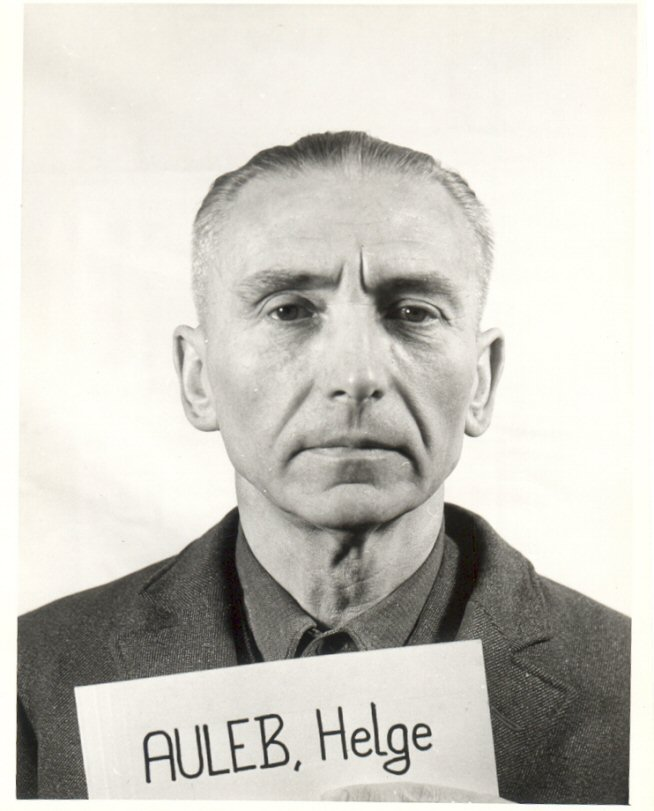
- Helge Auleb as a witness during the Nuremberg Trials
- Born: 24 March 1887; Gehren, German Empire
- Died: 14 April 1964 (aged 77); Düsseldorf, West Germany
- Military career
- Allegiance: German Empire; Weimar Republic; Nazi Germany
- Branch: Reichswehr; German Army
- Service years: 1907–1945
- Rank: General der Infanterie
- Commands: 290th Infantry Division; XXXXIX Mountain Corps; LXIX Army Corps
- Conflicts: World War I World War II
- Awards: German Cross in Gold

Helge Arthur Auleb (24 March 1887 – 14 March 1964) was a general in the Wehrmacht of Nazi Germany during World War II. He was born in Gehren.

Auleb commanded the 6th Infantry Division as part of VI Army Corps during Operation Typhoon in October 1941. He received the German Cross in Gold on 26 December 1941.

== Awards ==
- German Cross in Gold on 26 December 1941 as Generalleutnant in the 6th Infantry Division
- 1914 Iron Cross 2nd Class & 1st Class
- 1939 Clasp to the Iron Cross 2nd Class & 1st Class

Military offices
Preceded by General der Infanterie Franz Mattenklott	Commander of 72nd Infantry Division; 25 July 1940 – 4 September 1940	Succeeded by General der Infanterie Franz Mattenklott
Preceded by Generalleutnant Theodor Freiherr von Wrede	Commander of 290th Infantry Division; 19 September 1940 – 19 October 1940	Succeeded by Generalleutnant Theodor Freiherr von Wrede
Preceded by Generalleutnant Arnold Freiherr von Biegeleben	Commander of 6th Infantry Division; 14 October 1940 – 25 January 1942	Succeeded by Generalleutnant Horst Großmann
Preceded by General der Infanterie Franz Mattenklott	Befehlshaber Krim; 27 April 1943 – July 1943	Succeeded by Generalmajor Friedrich Köchling
Preceded by General der Gebirgstruppen Rudolf Konrad	Commander of XXXXIX Gebirgs-Armeekorps; 26 July 1943 – 15 August 1943	Succeeded by General der Gebirgstruppen Rudolf Konrad
Preceded by General der Artillerie Otto Hartmann	Befehlshaber Heeresgebiet A 17 September 1943 – 18 December 1943	Succeeded by redesignated Befehlshaber Transnistrien
Preceded by none	Befehlshaber Transnistrien; 18 December 1943 – 1 April 1944	Succeeded by ?
Preceded by General der Gebirgstruppen Julius Ringel	Commander of LXIX Armeekorps; 24 June 1944 – 8 May 1945	Succeeded by dissolved on 8 May 1945
