= 180th Infantry Division (Wehrmacht) =

- 180. Infanterie-Division
- Active: January 1940 - March 1945
- Country: Nazi Germany
- Branch: Heer (Wehrmacht)
- Type: Infantry
- Size: Division
- Engagements: Operation Market Garden; Battle of Arnhem; Battle of Wesel; Ruhr Pocket

The 180th Infantry Division (German: 180. Infanterie-Division) was an infantry division of the German Heer during World War II. The unit, at times designated Commander of Reserve Troops X/II (German: Kommandeur der Ersatztruppen X/II), 180th Division (German: 180. Division), Division No. 180 (German: Division Nr. 180), and Operation Division No. 180 (German: Einsatz-Division Nr. 180), was active between 1939 and 1945.

== History ==
=== 1939 ===
The 180th Division, also designated Commander of Reserve Troops X/II, was formed in Bremen in Wehrkreis X on 25 November 1939. The initial command staff assigned to Wehrkreis X, the 170th Division, had been reorganized into a field division and thus needed a replacement in the form of the 180th, which was redesignated Division No. 180 on 21 December 1939. The division's initial commander, appointed on 1 December 1939, was Kurt Woytasch. Woytasch was replaced by Martin Gilbert on 10 January 1940.

=== 1940 ===
In March 1940, the division consisted of the following elements:

- Infantry Reserve Regiment 22, Delmenhorst.
- Infantry Reserve Regiment 269, Oldenburg.
- Artillery Reserve Regiment 22, Verden.
- Panzerjäger Reserve Detachment 20, Bremen.
- Cavalry Reserve Detachment 13, Lüneburg.
- Nebel Reserve Detachment 2, Bremen.

=== 1942 ===
In January 1942, Gilbert was replaced as divisional commander by Herbert Lemke.

=== 1943 ===
On 16 August 1943, the division staff was temporarily moved to Verden, a move that was made permanent on 10 January 1944. In December 1943, the division consisted of the following elements:

- Grenadier Reserve Regiment 22, Oldenburg.
- Grenadier Reserve Regiment 269, Nienburg.
- Artillery Reserve Regiment 22, Verden.
- Cavalry Reserve Detachment 100, Lüneburg.
- Anti Air Reserve and Training Battalion 52, Delmenhorst.

=== 1944 ===
On 18 September 1944, the codeword Alarm Küste was given out to German forces in response to several Allied paratrooper landings in the Netherlands, collectively known as Operation Market Garden. The 180th Division, now designated Operation Division No. 180, was moved against the British forces. The division consisted of the following forces, with a strength of at least 8475 personnel:

- 180th Division Staff; 79 men.
- Grenadier Reserve and Training Regiment 269, including Grenadier Replacement Battalions 47 (five companies) and 65 (four companies) and Landschützen Training Battalion I./10 (four companies); 3208 men.
- Grenadier Reserve and Training Regiment 22, including Grenadier Replacement Battalions 16 (three companies) and 489 (four companies); 1308 men.
- Cavalry Reserve Detachment 100, including one heavy cavalry and three on foot; 808 men.
- Artillery Reserve and Training Regiment 22; 1013 men.
- Anti Air Reserve and Training Battalion 52, one of three companies without guns; 515 men.
- Intelligence Reserve Detachment Staff 20; unknown strength.
- Pioneer Reserve and Training Battalion 30, two companies; 382 men.
- Nebel Reserve and Training Regiment 1, eight batteries; 1162 men.

The division was also accompanied in combat by Kampfgruppe Fastenau, Battalion Wienke, and the Heavy Flak Detachments 362 and 666. The 180th Division was successful in slowing the Allied XXX Corps long enough to secure German victory at the Battle of Arnhem. It was under command of Bernhard Klosterkemper starting on 27 September 1944. Klosterkemper soon passed command to Martin Gilbert on 1 October. Several parts of the division that were not utilized in combat were later reformed into Division No. 480.

Following an order on 31 October 1944, Division No. 180 was reformed into the 180th Infantry Division. The 180th Infantry Division initially consisted of the following units:

- Grenadier Regiment 1221
- Grenadier Regiment 1222
- Grenadier Regiment 1223
- Division Fusilier Battalion 180
- Artillery Regiment 880
- Panzerjäger Company 1180 (later Panzerjäger Detachment 180)
- Intelligence Company 1180
- Division Supply Regiment 1180

=== 1945 ===
Between October 1944 and February 1945, the 180th Infantry Division served under the LXXXVI Army Corps. The division fought in the Venlo area between December 1944 and January 1945, during the Battle of the Bulge. Between 1st and 8th of January 1945, a reinforced company of about 150 soldiers successfully crossed the Maas River at Well and occupied the Dutch town of Wanssum in Operation Schneeman or Snowman. The feint was one of three offensives after the Battle of the Bulge, including the better known Operation Nordwind. Reestablishing the front caused British casualties and reminded the Allies that the Germans were still capable of offensive feints.

On 15 March 1945, Infantry Division Hamburg was integrated into the 180th Infantry Division. The division ended the war under the LIII Army Corps. After participating in combat against the 2nd British Army in the Battle of Wesel, the 180th Infantry Division was crushed in Operation Varsity in March 1945. The shattered remnants of the divisions were driven back by the Allied forces into the Ruhr Pocket, where the 180th Infantry Division fought its final battle.

== Noteworthy individuals ==
- Kurt Woytasch, divisional commander starting on 1 December 1939.
- Martin Gilbert, divisional commander starting on 10 January 1940 and again starting on 1 October 1944.
- Herbert Lemke, divisional commander starting on 24 January 1942.
- Bernhard Klosterkemper, divisional commander starting on 27 September 1944.
