= Max-Günther Schrank =

German Generalleutnant

August Max-Günther Schrank
- Max-Günther Schrank
- Born: 19 November 1898; Rieden am Forggensee, Kingdom of Bavaria, German Empire
- Died: 22 September 1960 (aged 61); Grünwald bei München, Bavaria, West Germany
- Military career
- Allegiance: Kingdom of Bavaria; Nazi Germany
- Branch: Army
- Service years: 1917–1945
- Rank: Generalleutnant
- Commands: 5. Gebirgs-Division
- Awards: Knight's Cross of the Iron Cross

August Max-Günther Schrank (19 November 1898 – 22 September 1960) was a German Generalleutnant who commanded the 5. Gebirgs-Division in World War II. He was also a recipient of the Knight's Cross of the Iron Cross for the Battle of Crete.

== Awards ==
- Iron Cross Second (1918) and First (1919) Classes
- Clasp to the Iron Cross Second (1939) and First (1939) Classes
- Honour Cross of the World War 1914/1918 (1934)
- Knight's Cross of the Iron Cross on 17 July 1941 as Oberstleutnant and commander of the I./Gebirgsjäger-Regiment 100
- Bavarian Military Merit Order 4. Class with Swords (1919)

Military offices
Preceded by General der Gebirgstruppen Julius Ringel	Commander of 5. Gebirgs-Division; 10 February 1944 - 18 January 1945	Succeeded by Generalmajor Hans Steets
