= 290th Infantry Division =

- 290. Infanterie-Division
- Division Insignia
- Active: 6 February 1940 – 8 May 1945
- Country: Nazi Germany
- Branch: Army
- Type: Infantry
- Size: Division
- Part of: Army Group North
- Nickname: Sword Division
- Engagements: Battle of France; Operation Barbarossa; 1941 Baltic offensive Siege of Leningrad; Demyansk Pocket; Operation Bagration; Courland Pocket

Commanders
- Notable commanders: Theodor Freiherr von Wrede

The 290th Infantry Division was a German infantry division in World War II. It was formed in the Munster Training Area in Wehrkreis X on 6 February 1940 and surrendered to Soviet forces at the end of the war as part of Army Group Courland.

== History ==
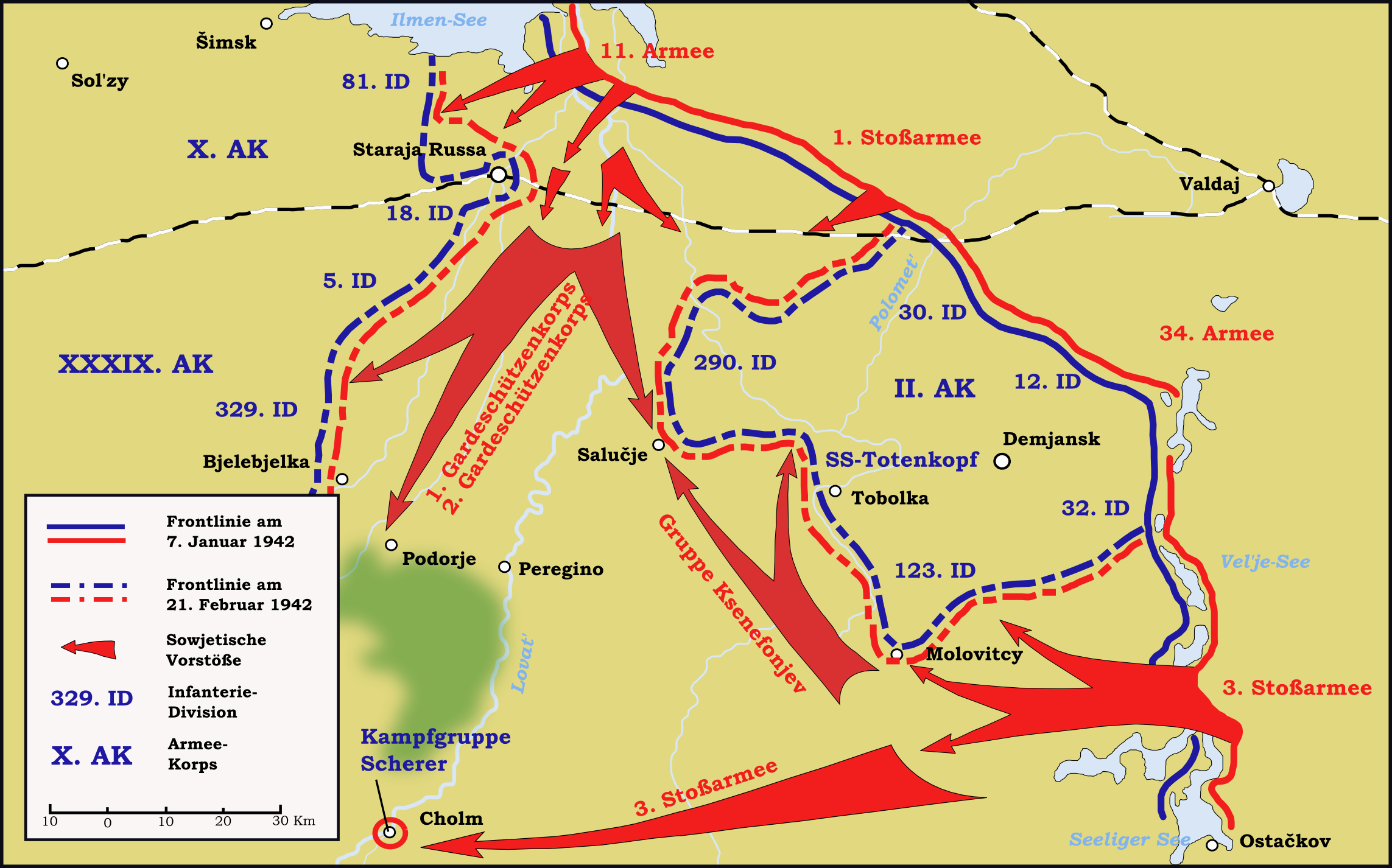
Offensive of the Red Army south of Lake Ilmen 7 January–21 February 1942.

The division participated in Fall Rot as part of Army Group B, and later performed occupation duties in France until February 1941, when it was sent to East Prussia during the buildup prior to Operation Barbarossa. It served in various sectors on the Eastern Front as part of Army Group North, later Army Group Kurland, for the remainder of the war.

In the winter of 1941 the division was trapped in the Demyansk Pocket along with the 12th, 30th, 32nd and 123rd infantry divisions, and the SS-Division Totenkopf, as well as RAD, Police, Todt organization and other auxiliary units, for a total of about 90,000 German troops and around 10,000 auxiliaries. Their commander was General der Infanterie Walter Graf von Brockdorff-Ahlefeldt, commander of the II. Armeekorps (2nd Army Corps).

== Commanding officers ==
- Generalleutnant Max Dennerlein (? February – 8 June 1940)
- Generalleutnant Theodor Freiherr von Wrede (8 June – 19 September 1940)
- General der Infanterie Helge Auleb (19 September – 14 October 1940)
- Generalleutnant Theodor Freiherr von Wrede (14 October 1940 – 1 May 1942)
- Generalleutnant Conrad-Oskar Heinrichs (1 May 1942 – 1 February 1944)
- Generalmajor Gerhard Henke (1 February – ? June 1944)
- Generalmajor Rudolf Goltzsch (? June – 18 August 1944)
- Generalmajor Hans-Joachim Baurmeister (18 August 1944 – 25 April 1945)
- Generalmajor Carl Henke (25 April – 27 April 1945)
- Generalleutnant Alfred Hemmann (27 April – 8 May 1945)

== Order of battle ==
=== 1940 ===
- Infantry Regiment 501
- Infantry Regiment 502
- Infantry Regiment 503
- Artillery Regiment 290
- Divisions Units 290

=== 1944 ===
- Grenadier Regiment 501
- Grenadier Regiment 502
- Divisions Fusilier Battalion 290
- Artillery Regiment 290
- Divisions Units 290
