= Theodor Freiherr von Wrede =

German general and Knight's Cross recipient

- Born: 3 November 1888
- Died: 30 March 1973 (aged 84)
- Military career
- Allegiance: German Empire; Weimar Republic; Nazi Germany
- Branch: Army
- Service years: 1907–1944
- Rank: Generalleutnant
- Conflicts: World War II
- Awards: Knight's Cross of the Iron Cross

Theodor Freiherr von Wrede (November 3, 1888 – March 30, 1973) was a German general in the Wehrmacht during World War II. He was a recipient of the Knight's Cross of the Iron Cross. Wrede retired from active service in 1944.

== Awards ==
- Knight's Cross of the Iron Cross on 22 February 1942 as Generalleutnant and commander of 290. Infanterie-Division

Military offices
Preceded by Generalleutnant Max Dennerlein	Commander of 290. Infanterie-Division; 8 June 1940 - 19 September 1940	Succeeded by General der Infanterie Helge Auleb
Preceded by General der Infanterie Helge Auleb	Commander of 290. Infanterie-Division; 14 October 1940 - 1 May 1942	Succeeded by Generalleutnant Conrad-Oskar Heinrichs
