= 141st Reserve Division =

- 141. Reserve-Division
- Active: 8 December 1939 - 19 February 1944
- Disbanded: 19 February 1944
- Country: Nazi Germany
- Branch: Army
- Type: Infantry
- Role: training
- Garrison/HQ: Insterburg

The 141st Reserve Division (Kommandeur der Ersatztruppen I and temporarily the 151st Division and Division Nr. 141), was a German infantry division during World War II .

== History ==
The Division was formed on 26 August 1939, as Kommandeur der Ersatztruppen I (Commander of Replacement Troops I) in Insterburg. On 13 November 1939, it was temporarily renamed as the 151st Division and then Division Nr. 141, on 8 December 1939. In September 1940 it was relocated to Prague, Protectorate of Bohemia and Moravia. When the German campaign in the East began, on 15 July 1941, the division was returned to Insterburg, Germany and the Wehrkreis I (Corps Area I). In 1942, Division Nr. 141 was redesigned as the 141st Reserve Division and it kept that name until 19 February 1944, when it was disbanded. Some of its men were transferred to reinforce the 68th Infantry Division.

== Commanders ==
- Generalleutnant Ulrich von Waldow (1 December 1939 - 1 April 1942)
- Generalleutnant Heinz Hellmich (1 April - 10 December 1942)
- Generalleutnant Otto Schönherr (10 December 1942 - 19 February 1944)

== Area of operations ==
- East Prussia (December 1939 - September 1940)
- Czechoslovakia (Protectorate of Bohemia and Moravia) (September 1940 - July 1941)
- Germany (July 1941 - April 1942)
- Germany (April - September 1942)
- Eastern Front, central sector (September 1942 - February 1944)
