= Julius Ringel =

Austrian general in the armed forces of Nazi Germany

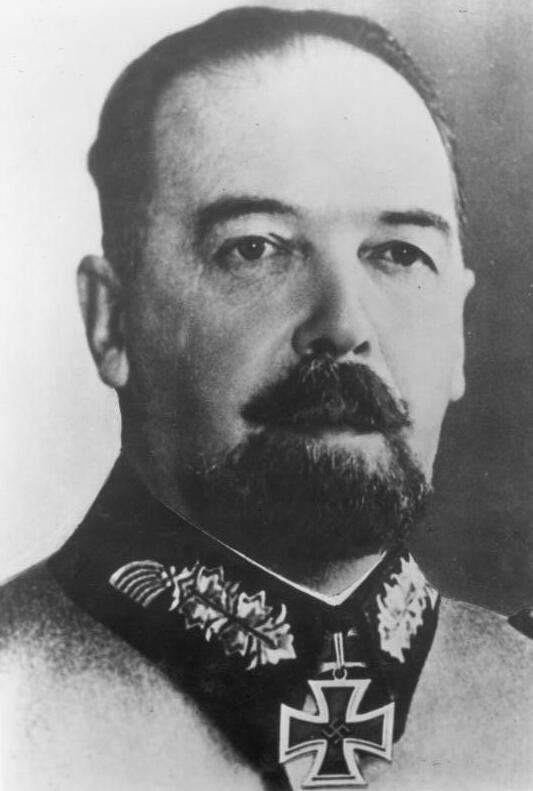
- Ringel in 1941
- Born: 16 November 1889; Völkermarkt, Duchy of Carinthia, Austria-Hungary
- Died: 11 February 1967 (aged 77); Bayerisch Gmain, Bavaria, West Germany
- Military career
- Allegiance: Austria-Hungary; Austria; Nazi Germany
- Branch: Austro-Hungarian Army; Austrian Army; German Army
- Service years: 1905–1945
- Rank: General der Gebirgstruppe
- Commands: 3rd Mountain Division; 5th Mountain Division; LXIX Army Corps; Army Corps Ringel
- Awards: Knight's Cross of the Iron Cross with Oak Leaves

Julius 'Papa' Ringel (16 November 1889 – 11 February 1967) was an Austrian general in the armed forces of Nazi Germany during World War II. He fought in the Western and Eastern fronts, as well as the Balkan Campaign. Ringel commanded the 3rd Mountain Division, 5th Mountain Division, LXIX Corps, Wehrkreis XI and the Army Corps Ringel. He was a recipient of the Knight's Cross of the Iron Cross with Oak Leaves.

== Early life ==
Julius Ringel was born in Völkermarkt in the Austrian state of Carinthia. In 1905, he was admitted to a military school in Vienna, graduating on 18 August 1909.

== Service in the Austro-Hungarian and Austrian Armies ==
Following his education, Fähnrich Ringel was assigned to the k.u.k. Landwehr Infanterie-Regiment 4 (a mountain infantry unit) and a year later, he was promoted to Leutnant. During World War I, Ringel saw action in Galicia and the Italian Alps where he was taken prisoner of war in 1918. Upon his return to the newly formed Republic of German Austria, Ringel fought against the troops of the Kingdom of Yugoslavia occupying Carinthia. Following the Carinthian Plebiscite and the creation of the First Austrian Republic, Ringel was transferred to the Austrian Federal Army where he rose to the rank lieutenant colonel in 1932.

== Service in the Wehrmacht ==
As an avid supporter of the Nazi Party, Ringel strongly encouraged the union of Austria with the German Reich and after the Anschluss enthusiastically joined the Wehrmacht with the 3rd Mountain Division. On 1 February 1939, Ringel was promoted to colonel. When World War II began, he was assigned to the 268th Infantry Division as a regimental commander and he took part in the campaign in the West.

On 7 June 1940, Ringel returned to the 3rd Mountain Division, becoming its commander on 14 July 1940. In October, he was promoted to major general and appointed commander of the newly established 5th Mountain Division. The division saw its first action in the spring of 1941 in the Balkans Campaign and took part in the operations codenamed Marita and Merkur aimed to capture mainland Greece and Crete. For his leadership during these operations Ringel was awarded the Knight's Cross of the Iron Cross on 13 June 1941. The operation in Crete was still underway when Ringel ordered his mountaineers to carry out reprisals against civilians who fought the invading Germans.

In November 1941, Ringel's division was posted back to Germany for rest and reorganization. In March 1942 it was sent to the Eastern Front southeast of Leningrad, to take part in the operations against the Soviet Volkhov Front. For his actions, Ringel was promoted to lieutenant general and in October 1943 received the Oak Leaves to his Knight's Cross. Ringel's division was transferred to Italy in December 1943 to man the Winter Line near the town of Cassino. Four months later, he was appointed commander of the LXIX Army Corps in Croatia. In June, Ringel was promoted to the General of the mountain troops and put in charge of the Military District Salzburg (Wehrkreis XVIII (Salzburg)) from which the Army Corps Ringel was formed. He held this appointment until the end of the war. He died in Bayerisch Gmain in 1967.

== Decorations ==
- Austrian Order of the Iron Crown, 3rd Class with War Decoration, Swords and Golden Bar (awarded two times)(10 November 1939)
- Eastern Front Medal (15 August 1942)
- Ärmelband Kreta (10 December 1942)
- Iron Cross (1939) 2nd class (10 November 1939) & 1st class (15 April 1941)
- Knight's Cross of the Iron Cross with Oak Leaves
  - Knight's Cross on 13 June 1941 as Generalmajor and commander of the 5. Gebirgs-Division
  - Oak Leaves on 25 October 1943 as Generalleutnant and commander of the 5. Gebirgs-Division

Military offices
Preceded by Generaloberst Eduard Dietl	Commander of 3. Gebirgs-Division; 14 June 1940 – 23 October 1940	Succeeded by General der Gebirgstruppen Hans Kreysing
Preceded by none	Commander of 5. Gebirgs-Division; 1 November 1940 – 10 February 1944	Succeeded by Generalleutnant Max-Günther Schrank
Preceded by General der Infanterie Ernst Dehner	Commander of LXIX Armeekorps; 31 March 1944 – 24 June 1944	Succeeded by General der Infanterie Helge Auleb
Preceded by General der Artillerie Max Grimmeiß	Commander of Wehrkreis XVIII (Salzburg); 21 January 1945 – 8 May 1945	Succeeded by dissolved on 8 May 1945
Preceded by none	Commander of Korps Ringel; February 1945 – 8 May 1945	Succeeded by dissolved on 8 May 1945
