= Le Vicel =

- Commune
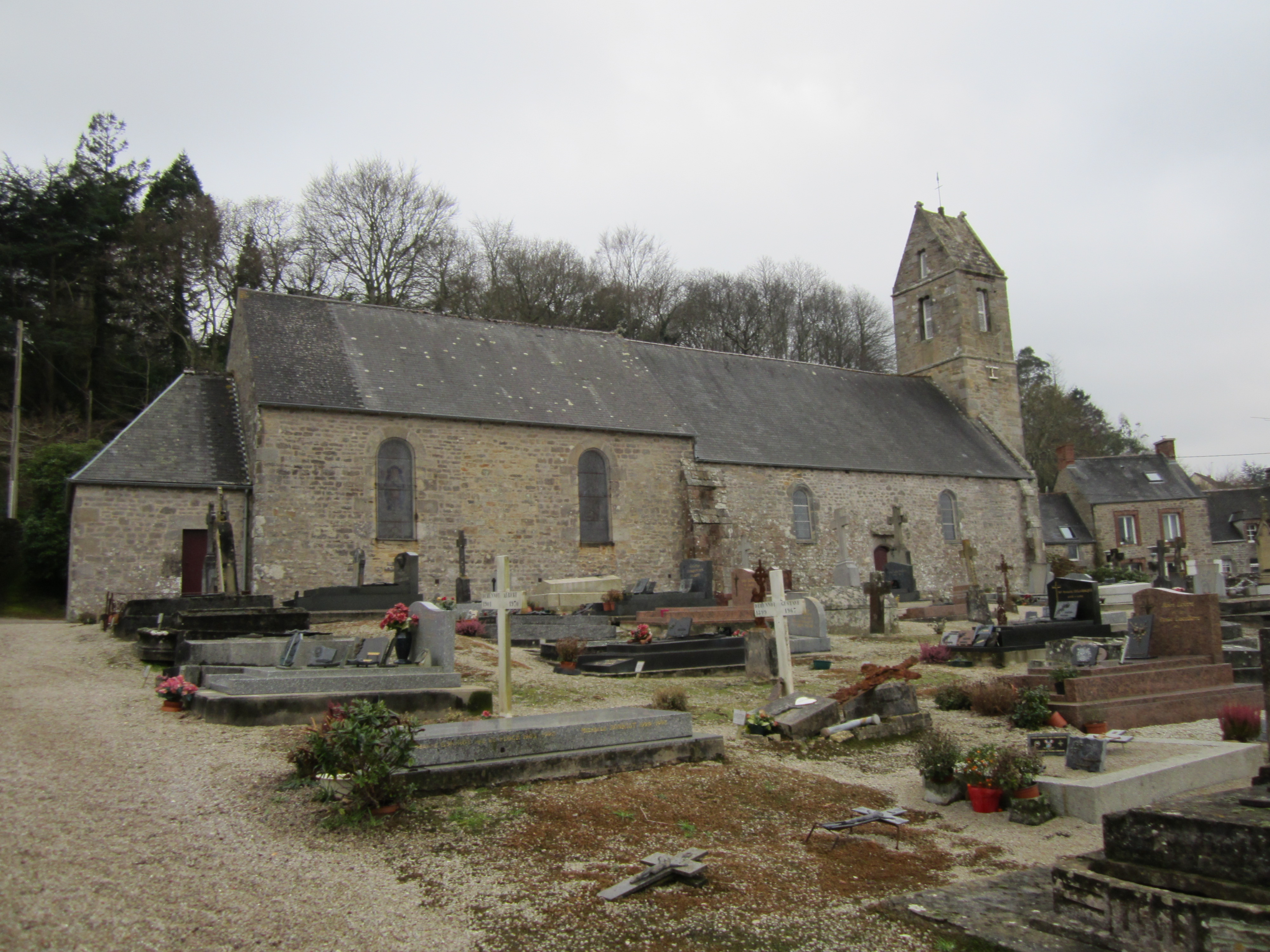
- Notre-Dame church
- Location of Le Vicel
- Location within France Location within Normandy
- Coordinates: 49°38′07″N 1°18′31″W
- Country: France
- Region: Normandy
- Department: Manche
- Arrondissement: Cherbourg
- Canton: Val-de-Saire
- Intercommunality: CA Cotentin

Government
  - Mayor (2020–2026): Jean-Marie D'Aigremont
- Area^{1}: 4.74 km^{2} (1.83 sq mi)
- Elevation: 50 m (160 ft)
- Highest elevation: 122 m (400 ft)
- Lowest elevation: 8 m (26 ft)
- Population (2023): 119
  - Density: 25.1/km^{2} (65.0/sq mi)
- Time zone: UTC+01:00 (CET)
  - Summer (DST): UTC+02:00 (CEST)
- INSEE/Postal code: 50633 /50760
- ^{1} French Land Register data, which excludes lakes, ponds, glaciers > 1 km^{2} (0.386 sq mi or 247 acres) and river estuaries.

Le Vicel (French pronunciation: [lə visɛl]) is a commune in the Manche department in Normandy in north-western France.

== See also ==
- Communes of the Manche department
