= Wilhelm Falley =

German general (1897–1944)

- Born: 25 September 1897; Metz, Alsace-Lorraine, German Empire
- Died: 6 June 1944 (aged 46); Picauville, Normandy, Occupied France
- Burial place: Orglandes German war cemetery
- Relatives: ∞ 1926 Hildegard Emma Amalie Maier (1905–1998); 1 son
- Military career
- Allegiance: German Empire; Weimar Republic; Nazi Germany
- Branch: Imperial German Army; Reichsheer; German Army
- Service years: 1914–1944
- Rank: Generalleutnant
- Commands: 91st Infantry Division
- Conflicts: World War I World War II
- Awards: Knight's Cross of the Iron Cross

Wilhelm Ernst Gottlieb Falley (25 September 1897 – 6 June 1944) was the first German general to be killed during the Normandy landings in France. At the time, he was commander of the 91st Infantry Division.

== Life ==
Falley joined the Anhalt Infantry Regiment No. 93 as a volunteer on 4 December 1914 during the First World War. After his basic training, he was transferred to the front on 25 August 1915 as a lieutenant in the reserve. In early December 1916, Falley was transferred to the staff of the 7th Guards Infantry Regiment as a mortar officer.

After the end of the war, Falley was taken into active military service on 29 January 1919 and served as an ordnance officer on the staff of the 4th Guards Regiment on Foot. With the formation of the Provisional Reichswehr, he joined the Reichswehr Infantry Regiment 29 and was transferred to the Infantry Regiment 5 on 1 October 1920.

Promoted to major general on 1 December 1943 as commander of the 246th Infantry Division, and lieutenant general on 1 May 1944, he held various commands before being appointed commander of the 91st Infantry Division in April 1944.

== Death ==
Falley was the first German general to fall in action during the Normandy landings. On D-Day, Falley was returning from Rennes, where a war game had been organised by the German High Command, to his Division headquarters, in Picauville. Falley was killed alongside his adjutant Major Joachim Bartuzat ( †) and a corporal Vogt (wounded) when their staff car was shot up by paratroopers of the U.S. 82nd Airborne Division, on the country road outside the rear wall of the German 91st Infantry Division's headquarters, Chateau de Bernaville, in Picauville, southwest of Sainte-Mère-Église, Normandy.

== Awards and decorations ==
- Iron Cross (1914), 2nd and 1st Class
  - EK II on 15 November 1915
- Hamburg Hanseatic Cross (HH) on 29 July 1918
- Wound Badge (1918) in Black
- Honour Cross of the World War 1914/1918 with Swords
- Wehrmacht Long Service Award, 4th to 2nd Class on 2 October 1936
- Sudetenland Medal on 19 July 1940
- Repetition Clasp 1939 to the Iron Cross 1914, 2nd and 1st Class
  - Clasp to EK II on 26 July 1940
  - Clasp to EK I on 23 June 1941
- Infantry Assault Badge in Silver on 26 August 1941
- Knight's Cross of the Iron Cross on 26 November 1941 as Oberstleutnant and Commander of 4th Infantry Regiment
- Winter Battle in the East 1941–42 Medal
- Order of Military Merit (Bulgaria), 3rd Class (Commander's Cross) with the War Decoration on 20 March 1942
- Demyansk Shield
- Wound Badge (1939) in Black on 12 November 1943
- German Cross in Gold on 20 January 1944 as Generalmajor (Brigadier) and Commander of the 246.Infanterie-Division

Military offices
Preceded by Generalmajor Heinz Fiebig	Commander of 246. Infanterie-Division; 5 October 1943 – 20 April 1944	Succeeded by Generalmajor Claus Müller-Bülow
Preceded by Generalleutnant Bruno Ortner	Commander of 91. Luftlande-Infanterie-Division; 25 April 1944 – 6 June 1944	Succeeded by Generalmajor Bernhard Klosterkemper
