= Gerhard Glokke =

German general

- Born: 26 November 1884; Posen, German Empire (now Poznań, Poland)
- Died: 5 June 1944 (aged 59); Münster, Germany
- Military career
- Allegiance: German Empire (1903–18); Weimar Republic (1919–33); Nazi Germany (1933–44)
- Branch: Prussian Army; Reichswehr; Wehrmacht
- Service years: 1903–1944
- Rank: General der Infanterie
- Commands: VI Army Corps; 16th Infantry Division; 16th Infantry Regiment; 2nd Battalion, 18th Infantry Regiment
- Conflicts: First World War; Second World War
- Awards: German Cross in Silver; Knight of the Royal House Order of Hohenzollern; Iron Cross 1st Class; War Merit Cross 1st Class with Swords

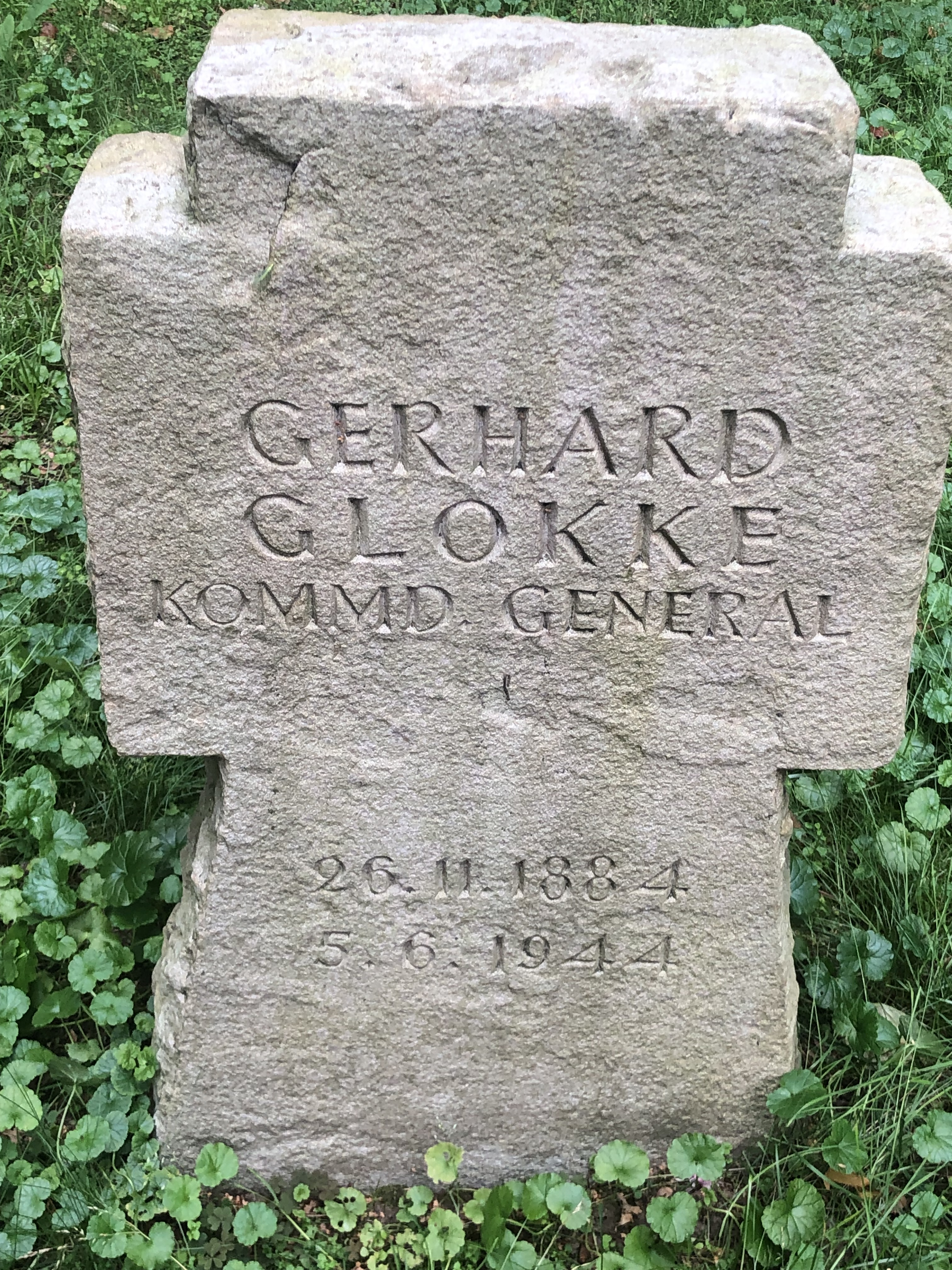
Grave cross of General Gerhard Glokke in the Lauheide Forest Cemetery in Münster

Gerhard Glokke (26 November 1884 – 5 June 1944) was a German general.

== Life ==
Born in Posen, he joined the Prussian Army on 1 March 1903 as a Fahnenjunker in 2 Lower Silesian Infantry Regiment Number 47. He was promoted to lieutenant on 19 August 1903 and from March 1908 until the end of February 1911 was the adjutant of its 1st battalion. He entered the Prussian Staff College as an oberleutnant on 1 October 1912 but had to leave early on the outbreak of the First World War.

After mobilisation Glokke was initially a regimental adjutant to Landwehr-Infanterie-Regiments Nr. 46, formed by his original regiment. This was followed by a spell as adjutant to 17. Ersatz-Infanterie-Brigade and 22. Landwehr-Infanterie-Brigade. He was promoted to hauptmann on 28 November 1914 and from 6 November 1915 to 28 November 1916 he served as the representative to the general staff for 3rd Landwehr Division. He also briefly commanded 2nd Battalion of "Keith" Infantry Regiment (1st Upper Silesian) Nr. 22 in February 1916 before joining the staff of the Army of the Bug. On 21 December 1916 he became chief of staff to 107 Infantry Division. After fighting on the Eastern Front his division was sent to the Western Front in mid November 1917, where it remained until the Armistice.

After the Armistice and his return to Germany, Glokke returned to the "King Louis III of Bavaria" Infantry Regiment (2nd Lower Silesian) Nr. 47. In July 1919 he became company-commander in the Reichswehr-Schützen-Regiment 9 of the Provisional Reichswehr. The official formation of the Reichswehr on 1 January 1921 included the 8th (Prussian) Infantry Regiment, of which Glokke was a company commander. From 1 November 1922 to 30 April 1923 he served on the staff of the regiment's 2nd Battalion in Liegnitz. He then served on the staff of the commander of the garrison at Glogau before time in 6th (Prussian) Artillery Regiment (from 1 June 1923) and with the commanding officer's staff at Wilhelmshaven (from 30 September 1926). During this time he was also promoted to major on 1 May 1924 (with seniority from 1 June 1923) and became a lecturer in tactics and military history at the Artillery School in Jüterbog. On 1 April 1928 he joined Gruppenkommando 2's staff at Kassel then on 1 March 1919 promoted to oberstleutnant. From 1 October 1929 he commanded 2nd Battalion of 18th Infantry Regiment in Münster and two years later was put in command of 16th Infantry Regiment in Oldenburg. On 1 February 1932 he was promoted to oberst, on 1 October 1933 made 'Kommandant (Wehrgau-Befehlshaber)' of Münster and on 1 October 1934 promoted to major general.

When the Reichswehr was converted into the Wehrmacht on 15 October 1935 he dropped his previous title and was instead listed as commander of 16th Infantry Division. He became the first divisional commander of the Wehrmacht and on 1 October 1936 was promoted to lieutenant general. He handed over his command to Gotthard Heinrici on 12 October 1937 and then was assigned to VI Army Corps. He was made the Corps commander in chief on 26 August 1939, as well as commander of Military Area VI (Münster). He reached his final rank of General der Infanterie on 1 September 1940, almost a year after the outbreak of the Second World War, and granted seniority in that rank on 1 December the same year. He was awarded the German Cross in Silver on 1 August 1943 and died on 5 June 1944 in Münster. He was buried in the Münster-Lauheide forest cemetery.

== Bibliography ==
- (in German) Dermot Bradley, Karl-Friedrich Hildebrand, Markus Rövekamp: Die Generale der Heeres 1921–1945. Die militärischen Werdegänge der Generale, sowie der Ärzte, Vetrinäre, Intendanten, Richter und Ministerialbeamten im Generalsrang. Band 4: Fleck–Gyldenfeldt. Biblio Verlag, Osnabrück 1996, ISBN 3-7648-2488-3, S. 310–311.
