= Fontenay-sur-Mer =

- Commune
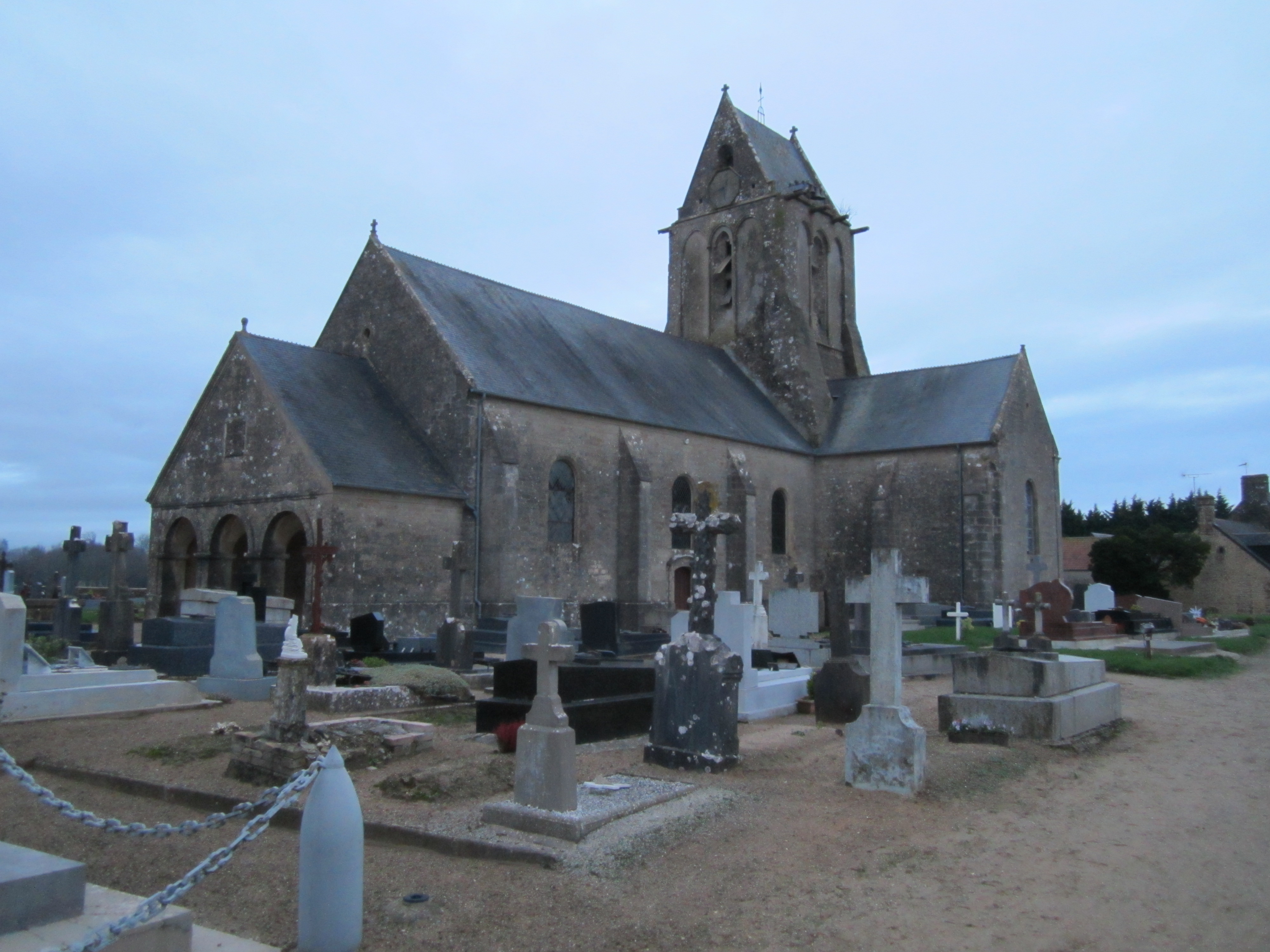
- The church of Saint-Martin
- Location of Fontenay-sur-Mer
- Location within France Location within Normandy
- Coordinates: 49°29′24″N 1°18′51″W
- Country: France
- Region: Normandy
- Department: Manche
- Arrondissement: Cherbourg
- Canton: Valognes
- Intercommunality: CA Cotentin

Government
  - Mayor (2020–2026): Philippe Anne
- Area^{1}: 8.18 km^{2} (3.16 sq mi)
- Highest elevation: 43 m (141 ft)
- Lowest elevation: 1 m (3.3 ft)
- Population (2023): 161
  - Density: 19.7/km^{2} (51.0/sq mi)
- Time zone: UTC+01:00 (CET)
  - Summer (DST): UTC+02:00 (CEST)
- INSEE/Postal code: 50190 /50310
- ^{1} French Land Register data, which excludes lakes, ponds, glaciers > 1 km^{2} (0.386 sq mi or 247 acres) and river estuaries.

Fontenay-sur-Mer (French pronunciation: [fɔ̃tnɛ syʁ mɛʁ], literally Fontenay on Sea) is a commune in the Manche department in north-western France.

== See also ==
- Communes of the Manche department
