= Infantry Division Jütland =

WW II German military unit

The 325th Infantry Division (German: 325. Infanterie-Division), generally known as Infantry Division "Jütland" (German: Infanterie-Division "Jütland"), was an infantry division of the German Heer during World War II. It was formed in March 1945, as one of the Wehrmacht's final emergency formations of the war. The division's deployment was never finished.

The division was named after the Jutland peninsula, the region where it was formed.

== History ==
The 325th Infantry Division was formed near Aalborg in occupied Denmark on 9 March 1945 from formations of recovering wounded veterans (German: Genesenden-Einheiten) in the area. The division initially consisted of Grenadier Regiments 590, 591, and 592, as well as Artillery Regiment 325 and Division Units 325. Each grenadier regiment was intended to consist of three battalions, whereas the artillery regiment was to be equipped with two detachments. The division's only commander was Generalleutnant Schaumberg.

The division never completed deployment, as Germany surrendered on 8 May 1945. However, some parts of the deploying division saw combat in the Weser sector, listed as Shadow Division 325.

Infantry Division Jutland was only ever under one formation, the LXXXVI Army Corps of the 1st Parachute Army under Army Group North West.
