= Heinz Hellmich =

German general during World War II (1890–1944)

- Born: 9 June 1890; Karlsruhe, Germany
- Died: 17 June 1944 (aged 54); Cherbourg, France
- Military career
- Allegiance: German Empire; Weimar Republic; Nazi Germany
- Branch: Army
- Service years: 1908–1944
- Rank: Generalleutnant
- Conflicts: World War I World War II
- Awards: Knight's Cross of the Iron Cross

Heinz Hellmich (9 June 1890 – 17 June 1944) was a German general (Generalleutnant) in the Wehrmacht during World War II and a posthumous recipient of the Knight's Cross of the Iron Cross of Nazi Germany.

On 1 April 1942, Hellmich was appointed commander of the 141st Reserve Division. In 1943, he worked with a Soviet defector, Red Army general Andrey Vlasov, and other volunteers from the Soviet Union as "General of the Eastern Troops" (General der Osttruppen), a position he held until early January 1944.

On 10 January 1944, Hellmich was moved to France and put in a command of the 243rd Infantry Division, a coastal defense division stationed in the Cotentin Peninsula. The division protected the western coast of the Cotentin Peninsula when Operation Overlord, the Allied invasion of Normandy, began on 6 June 1944. Hellmich was killed by 20-millimeter cannon shells during an Allied air attack on 17 June 1944.

== Awards ==
- Knight's Cross of the Iron Cross on 2 September 1944 as Generalleutnant and commander of 243. Infanterie-Division

Military offices
Preceded by General der Infanterie Walter von Brockdorff-Ahlefeldt	Commander of 23. Infanterie-Division; 1 June 1940 – 17 January 1942	Succeeded by Generalleutnant Curt Badinski
Preceded by Generalleutnant Ulrich von Waldow	Commander of 141. Reserve-Division; 1 April 1942 – 10 December 1942	Succeeded by Generalleutnant Otto Schönherr
Preceded by Position established	General of the Eastern Troops (General der Osttruppen); 1943 – 1 January 1944	Succeeded by General der Kavallerie Ernst August Köstring
Preceded by Generalmajor Hermann von Witzleben	Commander of 243. Infanterie-Division; 10 January 1944 – 17 June 1944	Succeeded by Generalmajor Bernhard Klosterkemper
