= 91st Infantry Division (Wehrmacht) =

91st Infantry Division 91st Air Landing Division
- 91. Infanterie-Division; 91. Luftlande-Division
- Active: 15 January 1944 – 10 August 1944
- Country: Nazi Germany
- Branch: Army
- Type: Infantry
- Role: Air Landing
- Size: Division
- Engagements: World War II: Operation Overlord

Commanders
- Notable commanders: Generalleutnant Wilhelm Falley

The 91st Air Landing Division (German 91. Luftlande-Infanterie-Division) was a German Army infantry division in World War II.

== History ==
The division was originally formed as an air landing division (Luftlandedivision) trained and equipped to be transported by aircraft (i.e. having only light artillery and few heavy support weapons) to take part in Operation Tanne Ost, an aborted airborne operation in Scandinavia. Despite its name, the 91st in practice was a regular Heer unit and spent its entire existence as a conventional infantry division.

Formed in the Baumholder area from replacement center personnel in January 1944 under the command of Generalleutnant Bruno Ortner, its command was transferred to Generalleutnant Wilhelm Falley and moved to the Cotentin peninsula with von der Heydte's 6th Parachute Regiment and 100th Panzer Replacement and Training Battalion, armed with captured French light tanks, attached as part of the German 7th Army.

Located within the landing zones of both the U.S. 82nd and 101st Airborne Divisions, it saw heavy fighting around Sainte-Mere-Eglise and Neuville-au-Plain. Falley, the divisional commander, was killed when he drove into an ambush.

On June 7, 1944, D-Day +1, the German 1058th Grenadier regiment of the 91st Luftlande Division, which was tasked with seizing the area of Sainte-Mere-Eglise, launched a fierce counterattack from the north towards Sainte-Mere-Eglise, which were defended by the 505th Parachute Infantry Regiment of the 82nd Airborne Division. The Germans attacked with intense mortar fire and StuGIII assault guns, and came very close to entering the town, before they were pushed back, and at least two assault guns were knocked out on the northern road just outside of the town.

Placed under the temporary command of Generalmajor Bernard Klosterkemper, It attempted to block the U.S. 4th Infantry Division's advance off Utah Beach. After the second week of the Allied invasion of Normandy the 91st had suffered so many casualties it was no longer considered combat effective as a unit.

Now at battle group strength, it was attached to the 77th Infantry Division then to the 243rd Infantry Division in Corps von Schlieban defending Cherbourg where most of its remaining forces were captured by the Americans. Remnants of the division under the command of Colonel Eugen Konig escaped to the south. Despite recommendation the unit be dissolved the Army High Command (Oberkommando des Heer, OKH) chose to rebuild it adding replacement battalions and sending it back to the front in early August.

Defending Rennes from Lieutenant General George S. Patton's U.S. Third Army, it again suffered heavy casualties and was reduced to battle group strength. It followed the German retreat to the Siegfried Line and was later consolidated with the remains of the 275th and 344th Infantry Divisions to form the 344th Volksgrenadier Division.

== Commanders ==
- Generalleutnant Bruno Ortner (10 February 1944 – 25 April 1944)
- Generalleutnant Wilhelm Falley (25 April 1944 – 6 June 1944) KIA
- Generalmajor Bernhard Klosterkemper (6 June 1944 – 10 June 1944)
- Generalleutnant Eugen König (10 June 1944 – 10 August 1944)

== Order of battle (June 1944) ==
- Command
- 1057th Grenadier Regiment
- 1058th Grenadier Regiment
- 191st Mountain Artillery Regiment
- 191st Engineer Battalion
- 191st Anti-tank Company
- 191st Field Replacement Battalion
- 191st Anti-aircraft Company
- 191st Signals Battalion
- 6th Parachute Regiment (attached from the 2nd Parachute Division)
- 100th Panzer Replacement and Training Battalion (attached)
