= Bernhard Klosterkemper =

WW2 German Army general (1897-1962)

- Born: 17 April 1897; Coesfeld, German Empire
- Died: 19 July 1962 (aged 65); Bremen, West Germany
- Military career
- Allegiance: German Empire; Weimar Republic; Nazi Germany
- Branch: Army
- Service years: 1916–1945
- Rank: Generalmajor
- Commands: 91. Luftlande-Infanterie-Division; 243. Infanterie-Division; 180. Infanterie-Division
- Conflicts: World War I World War II: Battle of France; Battles of Rzhev; Operation Overlord; American airborne landings in Normandy; Battle of Cherbourg; Operation Market Garden; Operation Veritable; Ruhr Pocket
- Awards: Knight's Cross of the Iron Cross

Bernhard Klosterkemper (17 April 1897 – 19 July 1962) was a German general (Generalmajor) in the Wehrmacht during World War II and a recipient of the Knight's Cross of the Iron Cross of Nazi Germany. Klosterkemper surrendered to Allied troops in May 1945 and was released in 1947.

== Awards and decorations ==
- Iron Cross (1914)
  - 2nd Class on 4 February 1918
  - 1st Class on 1 October 1918
- Wound Badge (1918) in Black on 11 May 1918
- Honour Cross of the World War 1914/1918 on 6 November 1934
- Sudetenland Medal with Prague Castle Bar
- Iron Cross (1939)
  - 2nd Class on 15 April 1940
  - 1st Class on 9 June 1940
- West Wall Medal on 22 November 1940
- Knight's Cross of the Iron Cross on 4 July 1944 as Oberst and commander of Grenadier-Regiment 920

Military offices
Preceded by Generalleutnant Wilhelm Falley	Commander of 91. Luftlande-Infanterie-Division; 6 June 1944 – 10 June 1944	Succeeded by Generalleutnant Eugen König
Preceded by Generalleutnant Heinz Hellmich	Commander of 243. Infanterie-Division; 17 June 1944 – 12 September 1944	Succeeded by Unit disbanded
Preceded by Generalleutnant Herbert Lemke	Commander of Division Nr. 180; 27 September 1944 – 1 October 1944	Succeeded by Generalleutnant Martin Gilbert
Preceded by Generalleutnant Martin Gilbert	Commander of 180. Infanterie-Division; 2 November 1944 – 8 May 1945	Succeeded by None
