= Marc R. Alexander =

American priest

Father Marc R. Alexander
- Church: Roman Catholic
- Diocese: Honolulu
- Previous post: Vicar General

Orders
- Ordination: October 18, 1985 by Joseph Anthony Ferrario

Personal details
- Born: April 13, 1958 (age 68) Sagami, Japan
- Education: Saint Meinrad Seminary and School of Theology; Catholic University of Louvain; American College of Louvain; Pontifical Gregorian University

Marc R. Alexander (born April 13, 1958) is a Roman Catholic priest of the diocese of Honolulu. Prior to February 1, 2006, he served the diocese as diocesan theologian and pastor of a clustered parish known as the Manoa-Punahou Catholic Community.

He was born in Sagami, Japan. He was educated in Hawai‘i at Saint Anthony of Padua Elementary School in Kailua, and Damien Memorial High School in Honolulu. He completed his secondary education in 1976 at Mount Vernon High School in Alexandria, Virginia. He studied at Saint Meinrad College Seminary in southern Indiana, as well as the Catholic University of Louvain in Belgium. He also studied at the Pontifical Gregorian University in Rome, earning a doctorate in sacred theology in 1993.

== Priestly ministry ==
After completing his seminary studies in the American College of Louvain (Leuven), he was ordained to the presbyterate for the diocese of Honolulu at Saint John Vianney Church in Kailua on October 18, 1985, where he served as a parochial vicar. From 1987 until 1990 he served as an associate director for adult religious education/catechesis for the Diocese of Honolulu, with an office at Saint Stephen Diocesan Center. In 1989, he was appointed interim pastor for the topside parishes on the island of Molokai. He created one of the first clustered parishes by combining these communities into the Molokai Catholic Community, where he served until 1990.

After his doctoral studies in Rome, he returned to Hawaii in 1993 to be appointed diocesan theologian and director of the diocesan lay ministry training program called Servant Leadership. He became founding executive director of the Hawaii Catholic Conference, the public policy arm of the Roman Catholic Church in the State of Hawaii, from 1994 until 1999. In 1998, Bishop Francis DiLorenzo appointed him as pastor of Sacred Heart Church and Maryknoll School in Punahou. This also included the Korean Catholic Community. In 1999 he was subsequently also appointed as pastor of Saint Pius X Church in Manoa. The two parishes were clustered and have since been called the Manoa-Punahou Catholic Community.

Since his public policy days, Alexander has testified on legislation addressing homelessness, housing (including the rental housing trust fund), same-sex marriage, euthanasia/assisted suicide and domestic violence. As vicar general, he led initiatives in strategic planning (the first-ever plan for the diocese won the 2008 American Planning Association Hawaii Chapter's Donald Wolbrink Chapter Achievement award), the diocesan capital campaign (which raised gifts and pledges over $57 million on a $30 million goal), and restructuring the central administration of the diocese. Bishop Clarence Silva appointed Alexander to the office of vicar general for the Diocese of Honolulu effective February 1, 2006. Bishop Silva appointed Alexander as his moderator of the curia on May 5, 2006. Alexander has also served as vice-president and chief executive officer of The Augustine Educational Foundation.

Alexander resigned as the Homeless Coordinator for the Hawaii Governor's Office in January 2012 due to an affair with a woman while he was an ordained Catholic Priest.

== Sources ==
- Hawaii Catholic Herald, Vol. 68, No. 29, December 30, 2005
- Hawaii Chapter of the American Planning Association, https://web.archive.org/web/20100802102756/http://www.hawaiiapa.org/awards_2008.html
- With Grateful Hearts Capital Campaign, https://web.archive.org/web/20100423052153/http://www.withgratefulhearts.org/index.htm
- "Catholic priest sued over alleged assault of Kailua teen". www.hawaiinewsnow.com.
- "Fr. Marc R. Alexander". bishop-accountability.org.

== Publications ==
- “The Problems with Physician-Assisted Suicide,” Origins: CNS Documentary Service (April 7, 2005).
- "Catholic Perspectives on Euthanasia and Assisted Suicide: The Human Person and the Quest for Meaning," Cultural Issues in End-of-Life Decision Making (Sage Publications, 2000)
- "Church and Ministry in the Works of G.H. Tavard" (Leuven University Press, 1994)
- "G.H. Tavard's Concept of Tradition," The Quadrilog: Essays in Honor of George H. Tavard (Liturgical Press, 1994)
