= Mark J. Alexander =

American army officer

Mark James Alexander (January 23, 1911 – May 21, 2004) was a United States Army officer and paratrooper during World War II.

Born in Lawrence, Kansas, Alexander was the second of four brothers, all of whom would serve in the U.S. Army during the war. He worked his way through college and received a Bachelor's Degree in Fine Arts from the University of Kansas in 1939. While working towards a master's degree, the father of a friend convinced him that war was on the horizon and the United States would be involved. Instead of waiting to be drafted, Alexander signed up with the Kansas Army National Guard in 1940 as a private, where he served in Company M, 137th Infantry Regiment. He then passed a competitive exam and received a commission as a second lieutenant.

By the end of 1941, he had volunteered for the paratroopers and was soon transferred to the 505th Parachute Infantry Regiment (PIR), commanded by Colonel James Gavin, at Fort Benning, Georgia. The 505th soon became part of the 82nd Airborne Division, under Major General Matthew Ridgway, serving alongside the 504th Parachute Infantry Regiment and the 325th Glider Infantry Regiment.

After the division was shipped to North Africa, Alexander became commander of the 2nd Battalion, 505th eleven days prior to the regiment's first combat jump. Within a year, he led three battalions of elite airborne troops into battle in Sicily, Italy and Normandy and served as executive officer for two regiments. So skilled was he in combat, the generals often used him to fill holes in the lines, until he was seriously wounded and almost died during the Normandy campaign. He recovered and was promoted to colonel in the Army Reserve after World War II, but the shrapnel that remained in his chest made him unfit for a career in the military. He was awarded the Silver Star:

The President of the United States of America, authorized by Act of Congress July 9, 1918, takes pleasure in presenting the Silver Star to Lieutenant Colonel (Infantry) Mark J. Alexander (ASN: 411615), United States Army, for gallantry in action on 5 October 1943, about one mile from *****, Italy. Lieutenant Colonel Alexander, Commanding the 2d Battalion, 505th Parachute Infantry Regiment, 82d Airborne Division, led his forward companies against prepared German positions south of the ***** River. When the enemy attempted to cut off and destroy Company E in detail, he took personal command of the leading elements of Company E and vigorously attacked the enemy's right flank, thus surprising and wiping out their entire force south of the ****. He personally captured two Germans armed with machine pistols. Lieutenant Colonel Alexander conducted these decisive operations under heavy enemy rifle, machine gun, mortar and artillery fire and by example inspired his men to drive the Germans across the river and clear the route north for the continued advance of the **** Army. His gallant actions and dedicated devotion to duty, without regard for his own life, were in keeping with the highest traditions of military service and reflect great credit upon himself and the United States Army.
