= Operation Diadem order of battle =

Operation Diadem order of battle is a listing of the significant formations that were involved in the fighting on the Winter Line and at the Anzio bridgehead south of Rome during Operation Diadem in May - June 1944 which resulted in the Allied breakthrough at Cassino and the breakout at Anzio leading to the capture of Rome.

== Allied Armies in Italy ==
C-in-C: General Sir Harold Alexander
Chief of Staff: Lieutenant-General Sir John Harding

=== U.S. Fifth Army ===
Commander:

Lieutenant General Mark W. Clark

==== U.S. VI Corps (At Anzio) ====
Major General Lucian K. Truscott
- U.S. 3rd Infantry Division (Brigadier General John W. O'Daniel) until 25 May 1944
- British 1st Infantry Division (Major-General John Hawkesworth)
- U.S. 45th Infantry Division (Major General William W. Eagles)
- U.S. 1st Armored Division (Major General Ernest N. Harmon)
- U.S. 34th Infantry Division (Major General Charles W. Ryder)
- U.S. 36th Infantry Division (Major General Fred L. Walker) (from 18 May 1944)
- British 5th Infantry Division (Major-General Philip Gregson-Ellis)
- First Special Service Force (3 regiments of two battalions each, U.S. and Canadian) (Brigadier General Robert T. Frederick)

==== U.S. II Corps (on the Winter Line) ====
Major-General Geoffrey Keyes
- U.S. 88th Infantry Division (Major General John E. Sloan
- U.S. 85th Infantry Division (Major General John B. Coulter)
- 1st U.S. Armored Group (three tank battalions)
- U.S. 3rd Infantry Division (Brigadier General John W. O'Daniel) (from 25 May)

==== Corps Expéditionnaire Français (French Expeditionary Corps) (on the Winter Line) ====
Général d'armée (General) Alphonse Juin
- 3ème Division d'Infanterie Algérienne (3rd Algerian Infantry Division) (Général de division (Major-General) Joseph de Goislard de Monsabert)
- 4ème Division Marocaine de Montagne (4th Moroccan Mountain Division) (Général de division (Major-General) François Sevez)
- 2ème Division d'Infanterie Marocaine (2nd Moroccan Infantry Division) (Général de division(Major-General) André W. Dody)
- 1ère Division Française Libre/1ère Division Motorisée d'Infanterie (1st Motorised Infantry Division) (Général de division (Major-General) Diego Brosset)
- Commandement des Goums Marocains (Command of Moroccan Goumiers - Three Groups of Tabors each comprising three tabors of 500 to 800 men) (Général de brigade (Brigadier-General) Augustin Guillaume)
- Corps Troops
  - 7ème et 8ème Régiments de Chasseurs d'Afrique (7th and 8th African Light Cavalry Regiment) (M10 tank destroyers)
  - Régiment d'Artillerie Coloniale du Levant (Levant Colonial Artillery Regiment)
  - 64ème Régiment d'Artillerie d'Afrique (64th African Artillery Regiment)
  - Groupe de canonniers-marins (Navy Artillery Battalion - two batteries)

==== Army Reserve ====
- H.Q. U.S. IV Corps
- U.S. 36th Infantry Division (Major-General Fred L. Walker) (Until 18 May 1944)

=== British Eighth Army (on the Winter Line) ===
Commander:

Lieutenant-General Sir Oliver Leese

==== British XIII Corps ====
Lieutenant-General Sidney C. Kirkman
- British 4th Infantry Division (Major-General Dudley Ward)
- British 6th Armoured Division (Major-General Vyvyan Evelegh)
- 8th Indian Infantry Division (Major-General Dudley Russell)
- British 78th Infantry Division (Major-General Charles Keightley)
- 1st Canadian Armoured Brigade (Brigadier W. C. Murphy)

==== I Canadian Corps ====
Lieutenant-General E. L. M. Burns
- 1st Canadian Infantry Division (Major-General Chris Vokes)
- 5th Canadian Armoured Division (Major-General Bert Hoffmeister)
- British 25th Army Tank Brigade (Brigadier J.N. Tetley)

==== Polish II Corps ====
Lieutenant-General Władysław Anders
- Polish 3rd Carpathian Rifle Division (Major-General Bolesław Bronisław Duch)
- Polish 5th Kresowa Infantry Division (Major-General Nikodem Sulik)
- Polish 2nd Armoured Brigade (Brigadier-General Bronislaw Rakowski)

==== British X Corps ====
Lieutenant-General Sir Richard L. McCreery
- 2nd New Zealand Division (Lieutenant-General Sir Bernard Freyberg)
- British 24th Guards Brigade (Brigadier A.F.L. Clive)
- British 2nd Parachute Brigade (Brigadier C.H.V. Pritchard)
- 12th South African Motorised Brigade (Brigadier R.J. Palmer)
- Italian Corps of Liberation (Six battalions and a regiment of artillery) (General Umberto Utili)

==== Army Reserve ====
- 6th South African Armoured Division (Major-General Evered Poole)

=== British V Corps (On the Adriatic front in a holding role directly under A.A.I.) ===
Lieutenant-General Charles Allfrey
- 4th Indian Infantry Division (Major-General Arthur Holworthy)
- 10th Indian Infantry Division (Major-General Denys Reid)
- British 23rd Armoured Brigade (Brigadier R.H.B. Arkwright)

== German Army Group C ==
Commander:

Field Marshal Albert Kesselring

=== Army Group Reserve ===
- 1st Paratroop Panzer Division (Brigadier-General Wilhelm Schmalz) (in OKW Reserve)
- 26th Panzer Division (Lieutenant-General Smilo Freiherr von Lüttwitz)
- 29th Panzergrenadier Division (Lieutenant-General Walter Fries)
- 90th Panzergrenadier Division (Major-General Ernst-Günther Baade)
- 92nd Infantry Division (Major-General Werner Goeritz) (Tiber Coastal Command)

=== Fourteenth Army (at Anzio) ===
Commander: Lieutenant-General Eberhard von Mackensen (until end May 1944, then under direct command of Kesselring)

==== I Parachute Corps ====
Lieutenant-General Alfred Schlemm
- 3rd Panzergrenadier Division (Brigadier-General Hans Hecker to 1 June then Major-General Hans-Günther von Rost to 25 June then Major-General Walter Denkert)
- 4th Parachute Division (Major-General Heinrich Trettner)
- 65th Infantry Division (Major-General Hellmuth Pfeifer)

==== LXXVI Panzer Corps ====
Lieutenant-General Traugott Herr
- 362nd Infantry Division (Major-General Heinz Greiner)
- 715th Infantry Division (Major-General Hans-Georg Hildebrandt)

=== Tenth Army (on the Winter Line) ===
Commander: General Heinrich von Vietinghoff

==== XIV Panzer Corps ====
Lieutenant-General Frido von Senger und Etterlin (on leave 17 April to 17 May during which time Lieutenant-General Otto Hartmann)
- 15th Panzergrenadier Division (Major-General Rudolf Sperl)
- 71st Infantry Division (Major-General Wilhelm Raapke)
- 94th Infantry Division (Major-General Bernhard Steinmetz)

==== LI Mountain Corps ====
Lieutenant-General Valentin Feurstein
- 1st Parachute Division (Lieutenant-General Richard Heidrich)
- 5th Mountain Division (Major-General Max-Günther Schrank)
- 44th Infantry Division (Major-General Bruno Ortner)
- 114th Jäger Division (Major-General Alexander Bourquin to 19 May 1944 then Major-General Hans Boelsen)

==== Korpsgruppe Hauck (on Adriatic front in holding role) ====
Major-General Friedrich-Wilhelm Hauck
- 305th Infantry Division (Lieutenant-General Friedrich-Wilhelm Hauck)
- 334th Infantry Division (Major-General Hellmuth Böhlke)

=== Armeegruppe von Zangen (in northern Italy) ===
Commander: Lieutenant-General Gustav von Zangen

==== LXXV Army Corps ====
Lieutenant-General Anton Dostler
- 356th Infantry Division (Major-General Egon von Neindorff until 15 May then Major-General Karl Faulenbach)
- 162nd Turkoman Division (Major-General Oskar von Niedermayer)

==== Corps Witthöft (Eastern sub-Alpine region) ====
Lieutenant-General Joachim Witthöft
- 188th Mountain Division (Major-General Hans von Hößlin)
- 278th Infantry Division (elements) (Major-General Harry Hoppe)

==== Corps Kübler (Adriatic coastal region) ====
Lieutenant-General Ludwig Kübler
- 278th Infantry Division (most of) (Major-General Harry Hoppe)

== Sources ==
- Carver, Field Marshal Lord (2001). The Imperial War Museum Book of the War in Italy 1943-1945. London: Sidgwick & Jackson. ISBN 0-330-48230-0.
- Clark, LLoyd (2006). Anzio: The Friction of War. Italy and the Battle for Rome 1944. Headline Publishing Group, London. ISBN 978-0-7553-1420-1.
- Houterman, Hans; Koppes, Jeroen. "World War II unit histories and officers". Archived from the original on 3 December 2008.
- Joslen, H. F. (2003) [1960]. Orders of Battle: Second World War, 1939–1945. Uckfield, East Sussex: Naval and Military Press. ISBN 978-1-84342-474-1.
- Molony, Brigadier C.J.C.; with Flynn, Captain F.C. (R.N.); Davies, Major-General H.L. & Gleave, Group Captain T.P. (2004) [1st. pub. HMSO:1984]. Butler, Sir James (ed.). The Mediterranean and Middle East, Volume VI: Victory in the Mediterranean, Part 1 - 1st April to 4th June 1944. History of the Second World War, United Kingdom Military Series. Revised by Jackson, General Sir William. Uckfield, UK: Naval & Military Press. pp. 14–15. ISBN 1-84574-070-X.
- "Orders of Battle.com". Archived from the original on 17 July 2007.
- Wendell, Marcus. "Axis History Factbook: German army order of battle". Archived from the original on 29 October 2006.
