= 179th Division =

179th Division may refer to:

- 179th Reserve Panzer Division, Wehrmacht, Germany
- 179th Rifle Division, Soviet Union

== See also ==
- List of military divisions by number
- 179th Brigade (disambiguation)
- 179th Regiment (disambiguation)
- 179th (disambiguation)
