= 15th Panzer Division =

German armored division during World War II

- 15. Panzer-Division
- 15th Panzer Division Unit insignia
- Active: 1940–43
- Country: Germany
- Branch: Army
- Type: Panzer
- Role: Armoured warfare
- Size: Division
- Part of: Afrika Korps
- Garrison/HQ: Wehrkreis XII: Landau
- Equipment: Panzer II (Note: See the picture below)
- Engagements: World War II; North African campaign; Tunisian campaign; Western Desert campaign; Second Battle of El Alamein

Commanders
- Notable commanders: Walter Neumann-Silkow; Hans-Karl Freiherr von Esebeck; Eduard Crasemann; Gustav von Vaerst

The 15th Panzer Division (German: 15. Panzer-Division) was an armoured division in the German Army, the Wehrmacht, during World War II, established in 1940.

The division, formed from the 33rd Infantry Division, fought exclusively in North Africa from 1941 to 1943, eventually ceasing to exist after surrendering in Tunisia in May 1943.

== History ==
The 33rd Infantry Division, forerunner of the 15th Panzer Division, was formed in April 1936 and part of the German defences in the Saarland during the early month of the war. It participated in the invasion of France and remained there after the French surrender as an occupation force. It returned to Germany in September 1940 to be converted to a tank division.

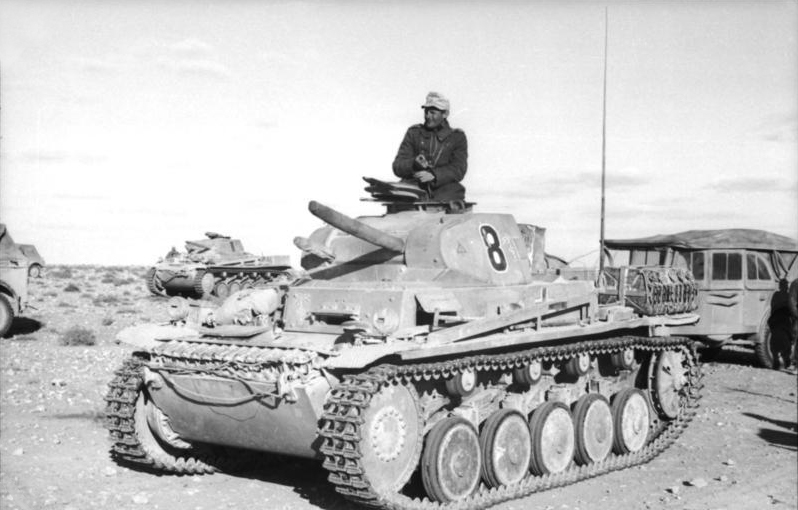
A Panzer II of the 15th Panzer Division. Note the faded insignia on the front, left of the handle and just below the turret.

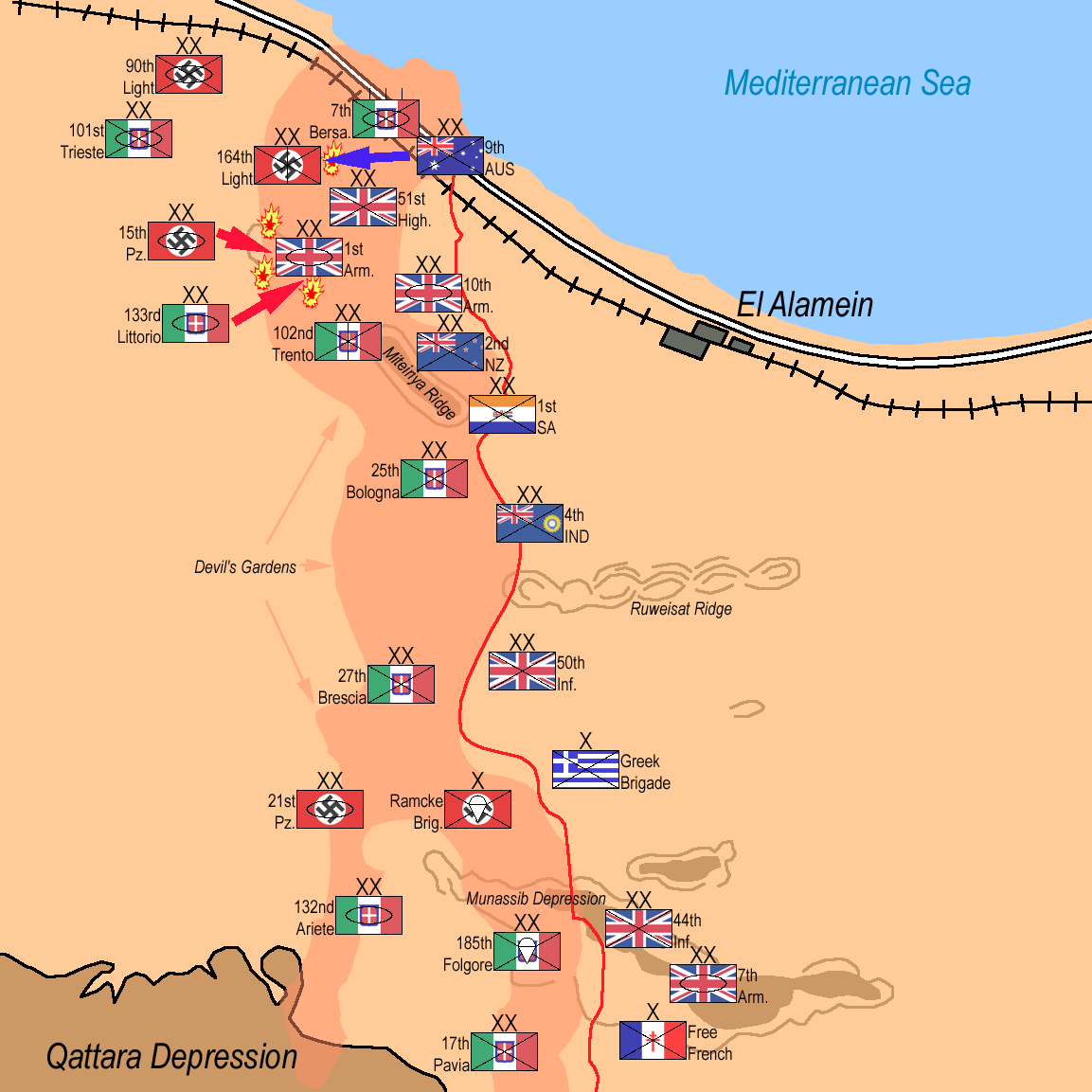
Second Battle of El Alamein: 1st Armoured Division is counter-attacked by Littorio Armoured Division and 15th Panzer Division

The division was transported to Libya in April 1941, joining General Erwin Rommel's Deutsches Afrikakorps (DAK) as one of two German tank divisions in North Africa at the time, the other having been the 21st Panzer Division. However, the Royal Navy intercepted and sank the ships carrying the division's Signal Reserve Battalion.

The division took part in all major German operations in North Africa except the first, for which it arrived too late. It was part of the successful German defence against British attempts to relieve Tobruk, Operation Brevity and Operation Battleaxe. On 18 November British forces began Operation Crusader with the objective of relieving the besieged forces at Tobruk. The 15th Panzer Division was situated to the east of Tobruk, suffered severe losses and was forced to retreat west.

The 15th Panzer Division was part of the German offensive in January 1942 that retook Benghazi. It participated in the battle of Gazala, the capture of Tobruk and the German invasion of Egypt which came to a stand-still at El Alamein. The division suffered severe loses at the Second battle of El Alamein in November 1942 and was forced to retreat along with the rest of the Afrikakorps.

After the retreat of the Axis forces to Tunisia the 15th Panzer Division was part of the battle of Kasserine Pass against inexperienced US forces in February 1943. The division eventually surrendered alongside other Axis forces in Tunisia in May 1943 and was not reestablished.

Survivors of the division who escaped the North African surrender by being in hospitals in Europe became part of the new 15th Panzergrenadier Division.

== Commanding officers ==
The commanders of the division:

- Generalleutnant Friedrich Kühn (November 1940 – 21 March 1941)
- Generalleutnant Heinrich von Prittwitz und Gaffron (22 March 1940 – 10 April 1941)
- Oberst Maximilian von Herff (10 April 1941 – 13 April 1941)
- General der Panzertruppe Hans-Karl Freiherr von Esebeck (13 April 1941 – 13 May 1941 )
- Oberst Maximilian von Herff (13 May 1941 – 16 June 1941)
- Generalmajor Walter Neumann-Silkow (16 June 1941 – 6 December 1941)
- Oberst Erwin Menny (6 December 1941 – 8 December 1941 )
- Generalmajor Gustav von Vaerst (9 December 1941 – 28 May 1942)
- Oberst Eduard Crasemann (28 May 1942 – 15 July 1942)
- Generalmajor Heinz von Randow (15 July 1942 – 25 August 1942)
- Generalleutnant Gustav von Vaerst (25 August 1942 – 11 November 1942 )
- Generalleutnant Willibald Borowitz (11 November 1942 – 13 May 1943 )

== Organisation ==
The organisation of the division in March 1941:

- 8th Panzer Regiment (I & II Battalions)
- 15th Infantry Brigade
  - 104 Motorized Rifle Regiment (I & II Battalions)
  - 115 Motorized Rifle Regiment (I & II Battalions)
  - 15 Motorcycle Battalion
- 33 Reconnaissance Battalion
- 33 Motorized Artillery Regiment (I, II & III Battalions)
- 33 Combat Engineer Battalion
- 33 Antitank Battalion
- 33 Divisional services
