= Eduard Crasemann =

German general in the Wehrmacht during World War II

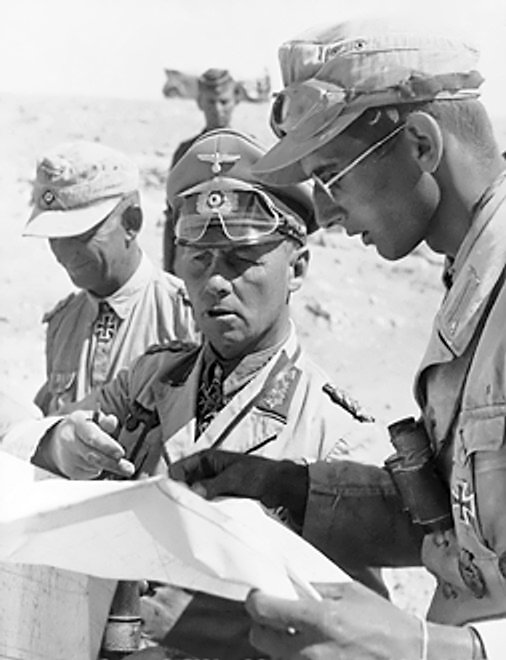
- Eduard Crasemann (behind Erwin Rommel)
- Born: 5 March 1891; Hamburg, German Empire
- Died: 29 April 1950 (aged 59); Werl Prison, Werl, West Germany
- Military career
- Allegiance: German Empire; Weimar Republic; Nazi Germany
- Branch: Imperial German Army; Reichswehr; German Army
- Service years: 1910–1919; 1936–1945
- Rank: General der Artillerie
- Commands: 15th Panzer Division; 26th Panzer Division; XII SS Army Corps
- Conflicts: World War I; World War II; Invasion of Poland; Battle of France; Western Desert Campaign; Siege of Tobruk; First Battle of El Alamein; Moro River Campaign; Battle of Monte Cassino; Gothic Line Offensive; Ruhr Pocket
- Awards: Knight's Cross of the Iron Cross with Oak Leaves

Eduard Crasemann (5 March 1891 – 29 April 1950) was a German General der Artillerie in the Wehrmacht and convicted war criminal who commanded several Panzer divisions during World War II.

Crasemann fought as an artillery officer during World War I on both the Western and Eastern Fronts but left the military in 1919, returning to civilian life. In 1936, he joined the Heer (Army) branch of the Wehrmacht. He served in the Battle of France and the Western Desert Campaign as a battalion- and regimental-level commander. He was briefly acting commander of the 15th Panzer Division in mid-1942. In 1944 he was given command of the 26th Panzer Division, which was operating in Italy. He then commanded the XII SS Army Corps from January to April 1945 until it surrendered to United States troops. He was a recipient of the Knight's Cross of the Iron Cross with Oak Leaves of Nazi Germany.

Under Crasemann's command, the 26th Panzer Division massacred over 160 Italian civilians in the Padule di Fucecchio massacre. In 1947 he was tried by a war crimes tribunal run by the British authorities in Padua. Convicted and sentenced to 10 years in prison, Crasemann died in prison in 1950.

== Early life ==
Born in the city of Hamburg on 5 March 1891, Eduard Crasemann joined the Imperial German Army in 1910 as a Fahnenjunker (officer cadet). He was commissioned as a Leutnant in the 46th Field Artillery Regiment the following year.

== World War I ==
Crasemann's regiment was attached to the 20th Infantry Division during World War I and he saw extensive service on the Western Front from August 1914 to March 1915 at which time the division was transferred to the Eastern Front. At the time, he was a Oberleutnant and regimental adjutant and had been awarded the Iron Cross, 2nd Class. Involved in fighting engagements in Poland and Ukraine, his regiment was soon back in France where it participated in battles in the areas around Champagne and Aisne. Crasemann was awarded the Iron Cross, 1st Class, for his part in these battles.

In response to a summer offensive launched by the Russians, the 20th Infantry Division was one of several that were transferred to the Eastern Front. It incurred several casualties and it was withdrawn from the front lines in September 1916. After completing a refit and a period of training, it was sent back to France. It was soon engaged in the Battle of Chemin des Dames and during this time, Crasemann was temporary commander of an artillery battery. Casualties were heavy and the division was soon out of the line for rest before being transferred to the Eastern Front for a few months. It returned to France in September but at this stage of the war, Crasemann was on a temporary transfer to the infantry as a commander of a company in the 77th Infantry Regiment.

Crasemann had only just returned to his regular duties as regimental adjutant in November 1917 when he was appointed to the General Staff of the Army and posted to the headquarters of the Marinekorps (Naval Corps), which provided naval personnel serving as infantry in Belgium. He remained here for six months before taking a post with the 35th Infantry Division as its quartermaster, which was also serving in Belgium. Promoted to Hauptmann in August 1918, his role ceased with the disbandment of the division following the end of the war. Crasemann returned to his original regiment and became a battalion commander. He applied to continue to serve with the newly formed Reichswehr (Imperial Defence) but was declined and subsequently left the military in April 1919.

== Interwar period ==
After several years of civilian life, Crasemann returned to service with the Heer (Army) branch of the Wehrmacht (Defence Force) in 1936 and was posted to the operations branch of the Oberkommando des Heeres (High Command of the Army), known as OKH. He was promoted to Major that June and the following year was transferred to the maneuvers and operational planning branch of the OKH. In November 1938 he was posted to II. Battalion of the 20th Artillery Regiment, where he spent six months on staff before taking up a battery command with the 73rd Artillery Regiment, 1st Panzer Division. This gave him vital experience in leading motorised formations, particularly when supporting tanks.

== World War II ==
During the invasion of Poland, Crasemann led his battery as the 1st Panzer Division advanced on and into Warsaw. Once the Polish Campaign was over, and after a spell in Germany, in February 1940 he was given command of II. Battalion, 78th Motorised Artillery Regiment. It was attached to the 7th Panzer Division, commanded by Generalmajor Erwin Rommel, and performed well during the campaign in France. Promoted to Oberstleutnant in August 1940, he was on occupation duty in France when Rommel, having taken command of the Afrika Korps in February 1941, arranged his transfer to North Africa. Here Crasemann was appointed commander of the 33rd Motorised Artillery Regiment.

Crasemann's new command was part of 15th Panzer Division and with it, he participated in the significant engagements in North Africa, including Operation Crusader and the battles around Tobruk. Awarded the Knight's Cross of the Iron Cross on 26 December 1941 for his leadership of the 33rd Motorised Artillery Regiment, he was promoted to Oberst early the following year. When the commander of the 15th Panzer Division was wounded in May 1942, Crasemann was made its acting commander. He led the division through the Battle of Gazala and, along with the rest of Rommel's forces, contributed to the British defeat. In late July, after the subsequent fighting during which the division, along with the 21st Panzer Division, captured Tobruk and 35,000 Allied soldiers, Crasemann reverted to command of the 33rd Artillery Regiment as Generalmajor Heinz von Randow had arrived in Africa to take over the division.

The regiment participated in the Battle of Alam Halfa and the subsequent Second Battle of El Alamein, after which it had only seven guns. The Afrika Korps was now in retreat from Egypt and it had withdrawn to Tripolitania when, on 17 January 1943, Crasemann was dispatched back to Germany and placed in reserve. After a period of three months, he was posted to the Eastern Front as commander of the 116th Panzer Artillery Regiment, 5th Panzer Division. He performed well in the fighting around Orel from mid-July to mid-August and on 1 September 1943 was given a posting to XXIV Panzer Corps as commander of 143rd Artillery Command. Under General der Panzertruppe (General of Panzer Troops) Walter Nehring, he served throughout the defensive battles of late 1943 and early 1944.

In April 1944, Crasemann went to Germany for a period of leave and then, instead of returning to Russia, he went on a one-month divisional commanders' course at the War Academy at Hirschberg. In early July 1944 he was posted to Italy as the acting commander of 26th Panzer Division. His term in command was short, as Generalmajor Hans Boelsen arrived on 18 July, with Crasemann reverting to deputy commander. However, the following month Boelsen took over the 18th Panzergrenadier Division while Crasemann became the permanent commander of 26th Panzer Division. Engaged in the fighting on the Gothic Line with the Eighth Army, the 26th Panzer Division fought a series of delaying actions, retreating to just south of Bologna at which time it was withdrawn for a rest. Crasemann was awarded the Oak Leaves to his Knight's Cross. promoted to Generalmajor in October, and was recalled to Germany for promotion.

Crasemann was appointed commander of XII SS Army Corps, 15th Army, in early 1945, taking over from General der Infanterie Günther Blumentritt. Despite the SS designation in its title, his new command consisted largely of Heer personnel. Stationed on the Western Front along the Ruhr River it opposed the United States Ninth Army, which commenced an offensive on 23 February. He was promoted Generalleutnant two days later. The Germans were pushed back and by 1 April had become encircled in the Ruhr Pocket. XII SS Army Corps was destroyed and Crasemann surrendered to United States troops on 17 April. Despite his capture, Crasemann was promoted to General der Artillerie on 20 April 1945.

== Trial and conviction ==
Imprisoned in Special Camp 11 along with several other high ranking German personnel, in 1947 Crasemann faced a war crimes tribunal run by British authorities in Padua. This was in relation to a charge of complicity with the massacre of 162 Italian civilians in Padule di Fucecchio near Florence on 23 August 1944, during his time in command of 26th Panzer Division. He was found guilty of war crimes and sentenced to 10 years imprisonment. He spent the rest of his life in prison, dying of unknown causes in Werl Prison on 28 April 1950.

== Summary of career ==
=== Awards and decorations ===
- Iron Cross (1914)
  - 2nd Class (13 September 1914)
  - 1st Class (15 October 1915)
- Clasp to the Iron Cross (1939)
  - 2nd Class (30 September 1939)
  - 1st Class (1 June 1940)
- German Cross in Gold on 1 November 1943 as Oberst with Panzer-Artillerie-Regiment 116
- Knight's Cross of the Iron Cross with Oak Leaves
  - Knight's Cross on 26 December 1941 as Oberstleutnant and commander of Artillerie-Regiment 33 (motorized)
  - 683rd Oak Leaves on 18 December 1944 as Generalmajor and commander of 26th Panzer Division

=== Dates of rank ===
Imperial German Army
18 August 1911:	Leutnant (second lieutenant)
18 August 1918:	Hauptmann (captain)
Wehrmacht
1 June 1938:	Major (major)
1 August 1940:	Oberstleutnant (lieutenant colonel)
1 February 1942:	Oberst (colonel)
1 October 1944:	Generalmajor (brigadier general)
27 February 1945:	Generalleutnant (major general)
20 April 1945:	General der Artillerie (General of the Artillery)

Military offices
Preceded by Generalmajor Gustav von Vaerst	Acting commander of 15th Panzer Division; 26 May 1942 – 25 July 1942	Succeeded by Generalmajor Heinz von Randow
Preceded by Generalmajor Smilo Freiherr von Lüttwitz	Commander of 26th Panzer Division; 6 July 1944 – 18 July 1944	Succeeded by Generalmajor Dr. rer. pol. Dr. jur. Hans Boelsen
Preceded by Generalmajor Dr. rer. pol. Dr. jur. Hans Boelsen	Commander of 26th Panzer Division; 26 August 1944 – 28 January 1945	Succeeded by Oberst Alfred Kuhnert
Preceded by Generalleutnant Fritz Bayerlein	Commander of XII SS Corps; 29 January 1945 – 16 April 1945	Succeeded by Capitulation
