= Heinz von Randow =

German army general (1890–1942)

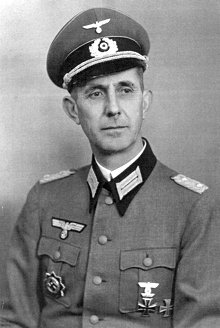
- Randow, c. 1942
- Born: Heinz Friedrich von Randow; 15 November 1890; Grammow, Grand Duchy of Mecklenburg-Schwerin, German Empire
- Died: 21 December 1942 (aged 52) near Sirte, Libya
- Buried: German war cemetery, Tobruk, Libya
- Allegiance: German Empire; Weimar Republic; Nazi Germany
- Service years: 1910–1942
- Rank: Generalleutnant
- Conflicts: World War I; World War II; Invasion of Poland; Battle of France; Operation Barbarossa; North African campaign
- Awards: German Cross in gold Clasp to the Iron Cross, 1st and 2nd class
- Spouse: Elisabeth von Trotha
- Children: 3

Heinz Friedrich von Randow (15 November 1890 – 21 December 1942) was a German career army officer who fought in both world wars. During World War II, he was a regimental – later a division – commander who took part in the invasion of Poland, the Battle of France, the Russian campaign and the North African campaign. He was killed in action in Libya and was given a posthumous promotion to Generalleutnant.

== Early career and World War I ==
Randow was born in Grammow in the Grand Duchy of Mecklenburg-Schwerin. He joined the Royal Prussian Army as a Fahnenjunker (officer cadet) in 1910, then attended the military academy and was commissioned as a Leutnant on 20 November 1911, five days after his 21st birthday. He was assigned to the 18th (2nd Mecklenburgian) Dragoon Regiment in Parchim. With the Parchim dragoons he fought during World War I, first in France, and later on the eastern front, mostly near Dünaburg (Daugavpils), then in Riga. In January 1917, he was promoted to Oberleutnant.

== Interwar years ==
After the war, he remained in the post-war Reichswehr, first becoming a riding instructor at the army riding school in Hanover. In 1922, he was posted to the 14th Cavalry Regiment and advanced to Rittmeister in 1924. From 1925, he was the regimental adjutant and, from 1926 to 1929, chief of the 2nd squadron. In 1936, Randow was promoted to Oberstleutnant, and was named commander of the 2nd battalion of his regiment in Parchim. In October 1937, he advanced to become the commander of the 13th Cavalry Regiment in Lüneburg and was promoted to Oberst in February 1939.

== World War II and death ==
Randow took part in the invasion of Poland in September 1939 as commander of the 1st Cavalry Brigade. On 26 October 1939, he took over as commander of the 26th Infantry Regiment and participated in the campaign in France. In March 1941, he was given command of the 2nd Cavalry Brigade and he took part in the invasion of the Soviet Union the following June. He was awarded the German Cross, in gold, on 19 December 1941.

In April 1942, Randow was promoted to Generalmajor. He then successively led the 17th Rifle Brigade of the 17th Panzer Division from April 1942, the 15th Panzer Division from July, and the 21st Panzer Division from September, the latter two units attached to the German Africa Corps. On 21 December 1942, Randow's vehicle struck a land mine south of Sirte in Libya and he was killed. He was buried in the German military cemetery at Tobruk. After his death, he was granted a posthumous promotion to Generalleutnant, effective 1 December 1942.

== Family ==
On 24 May 1933, Randow married the then 32-year-old Elisabeth von Trotha, daughter of retired army Major Wilhelm von Trotha and his wife Irmgard Baroness von Cornberg. The wedding was at the Trotha's estate in Lower Lusatia, Kümmritz. Randow had three children.

== Awards and decorations ==
- Iron Cross (1914) 2nd and 1st class
- Military Merit Cross of Mecklenburg-Schwerin 1st class
- Hanseatic Cross of Hamburg
- Honour Cross of the World War 1914/1918
- German Cross in gold (19 December 1941)
- Clasp to the Iron Cross 2nd and 1st class
- Wound Badge in gold

== Sources ==
- Patzwall, Klaus D.; Scherzer, Veit (2001). Das Deutsche Kreuz 1941–1945. Geschichte und Inhaber. Vol. II. Norderstedt: Verlag Klaus D. Patzwall. ISBN 978-3-931-53345-8.
- Webb, James Jack (2025). Generals and Admirals of the Third Reich: For Country or Fuehrer. Vol. 3: P–Z. Havertown, PA: Casemate Publishers. ISBN 978-1-952-71518-1.

Military offices
Preceded by Generalleutnant Eduard Crasemann	Commander of 15th Panzer Division; 15 July 1942 – 25 August 1942	Succeeded by General Gustav von Värst
Preceded by Generalleutnant Carl-Hans Lungershausen	Commander of 21st Panzer Division; 18 September 1942 – 21 December 1942	Succeeded by Generalleutnant Hans-Georg Hildebrandt
