= Lüttwitz =

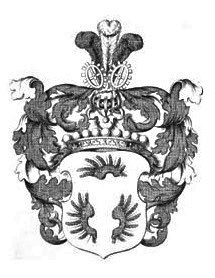
Coat of arms of the Lüttwitz family

The Lüttwitz family is an old Silesian noble family originating from Upper Lusatia, whose members held significant military posts within the German Empire.

== Notable members ==
- Heinrich Freiherr von Lüttwitz (1896–1969), German army officer and equestrian
- Smilo Freiherr von Lüttwitz (1895–1975), German army general
- Walther von Lüttwitz (1859–1942), German army general
