= Hans-Georg Leyser =

- Born: 16 June 1896
- Died: 18 April 1980 (aged 83)
- Military career
- Allegiance: German Empire; Weimar Republic; Nazi Germany
- Branch: Army
- Service years: 1914–1945
- Rank: Generalmajor
- Commands: 29th Motorized Infantry Division
- Conflicts: World War II
- Awards: Knight's Cross of the Iron Cross

Hans-Georg Leyser (16 June 1896 – 18 April 1980) was a general in the Wehrmacht during World War II who commanded the 29. Infanterie-Division. He was a recipient of the Knight's Cross of the Iron Cross. Leyser surrendered on 31 January 1943 during the Battle of Stalingrad.

== Awards and decorations ==
- Knight's Cross of the Iron Cross on 3 May 1942 as Oberst and commander of Infanterie-Regiment 51 (mot.)

Military offices
Preceded by Generalmajor Max Fremerey	Commander of 29. Infanterie-Division (mot.); 25 September 1941 – 31 January 1943	Succeeded by Generalmajor Walter Fries
