= Von Luettwitz =

von Luettwitz can refer to either:

- Heinrich Freiherr von Lüttwitz
- Smilo Freiherr von Lüttwitz
- Walther von Lüttwitz
