= Nustrow =

- Municipality
- Location of Nustrow within Rostock district
- Interactive map of Nustrow
- Location within Germany Location within Mecklenburg-Vorpommern
- Coordinates: 54°1′N 12°36′E
- Country: Germany
- State: Mecklenburg-Vorpommern
- District: Rostock
- Municipal assoc.: Tessin

Government
  - Mayor: Horst Eggers

Area
  - Total: 6.95 km^{2} (2.68 sq mi)
- Elevation: 31 m (102 ft)

Population (2025-12-31)
  - Total: 173
  - Density: 24.9/km^{2} (64.5/sq mi)
- Time zone: UTC+01:00 (CET)
  - Summer (DST): UTC+02:00 (CEST)
- Postal codes: 18195
- Dialling codes: 038205
- Vehicle registration: DBR
- Website: Amt Tessin

Nustrow is a municipality in the Rostock district, in Mecklenburg-Vorpommern, Germany.
