= Max Fremerey =

- Born: 5 May 1889
- Died: 20 September 1968 (aged 79)
- Military career
- Allegiance: Nazi Germany
- Branch: Army (Wehrmacht)
- Rank: Generalleutnant
- Commands: 29th Motorized Infantry Division; 155th Reserve Panzer Division
- Conflicts: World War II
- Awards: Knight's Cross of the Iron Cross

Max Fremerey (5 May 1889 – 20 September 1968) was a German general in the Wehrmacht during World War II who commanded several divisions. He was a recipient of the Knight's Cross of the Iron Cross.

== Awards and decorations ==
- Knight's Cross of the Iron Cross on 28 July 1942 as Generalmajor and commander of 29. Infanterie-Division (motorisiert)

Military offices
Preceded by Generalmajor Walter von Boltenstern	Commander of 29. Infanterie-Division (motorisiert); 20 September 1941 - 25 September 1942	Succeeded by Generalmajor Hans-Georg Leyser
Preceded by Generalleutnant Franz Landgraf	Commander of 155. Reserve-Panzer-Division; 1 October 1943 - 30 April 1944	Succeeded by None (Absorbed in 9. Panzer-Division)
