= Curt von Jesser =

Austrian general in the Wehrmacht of Nazi Germany

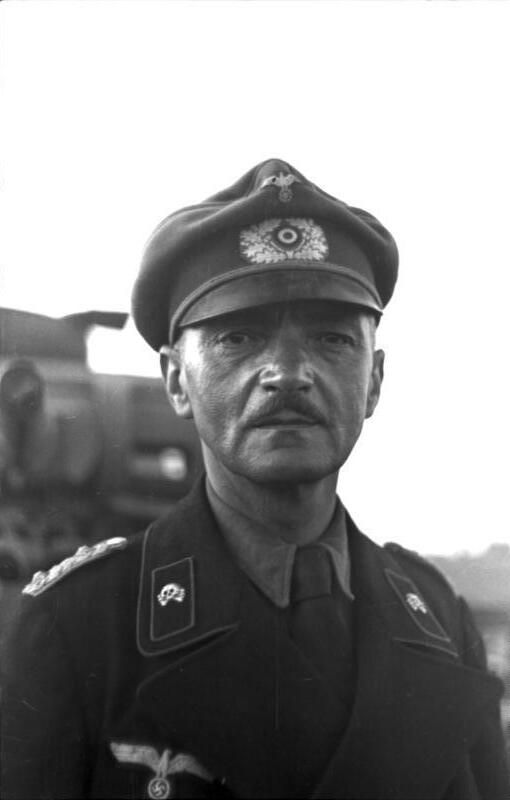
- Oberst Curt von Jesser
- Born: 4 November 1890; Wadowice, Kingdom of Galicia and Lodomeria, Austria-Hungary
- Died: 18 August 1950 (aged 59); Vienna, Austria
- Military career
- Allegiance: Austria-Hungary (to 1918); First Austrian Republic (to 1938); Nazi Germany
- Branch: Army
- Service years: 1909–1938 (Austria); 1938–1945 (Germany)
- Rank: Oberstleutnant (Austria); Generalmajor (Germany)
- Commands: 155th Reserve Panzer Division
- Conflicts: World War I; World War II; Battle of Belgium; Battle of France; Invasion of Yugoslavia; Operation Barbarossa; Battle of Brody; Battle of Uman; Battle of Rostov; Battle of Mont Mouchet; Battle of Mont Gargan
- Awards: Knight's Cross of the Iron Cross

Curt von Jesser (4 November 1890 – 18 August 1950) was an Austrian general in the Wehrmacht of Nazi Germany during World War II. He was a recipient of the Knight's Cross of the Iron Cross.

Jesser was born on November 4, 1890, in Wadowice as the son of future Austrian-Hungarian Feldmarschalleutnant Moritz von Jesser. He entered the Austrian Army on August 18, 1909, with the rank of Kadett-Offiziersstellvertreter and was assigned to the 6th Rifle-Regiment (Schützen Regiment 6). He remained in Austrian service after World War I and became a Wehrmacht soldier after the Anschluss of Austria in 1938. In World War II he was promoted to the rank of Generalmajor. He commanded the 155. Reserve-Panzer-Division from 24 August 1943 to 6 September 1943. On July 18, 1944, Georges Guingouin brigade was attacked by General von Jesser brigade which had arrived on the scene, supported by various reinforcements, notably Jean de Vaugelas French Milice, triggering the battle of Mont-Gargan, which ended on July 24. Between June and August 1944, he commanded Sicherungs-Brigade 74, also known as Kampfgruppe Jesser or "Jesser Brigade" in operations against Maquis in rural France. He was given command of Festungsabschnitt Steiermark in 1945.

Curt von Jesser died in Vienna on 18 August 1950.

== Awards ==
- Knight's Cross of the Iron Cross on 18 January 1942 as Oberst and commander of Panzer-Regiment 36
- German Cross in Gold (29 November 1941)
- Iron Cross, 1st Class (1939)
- 1939 Clasp to the Iron Cross 2nd Class
- Austrian Military Merit Cross, 3rd class with War Decoration (World War I award)
- Austrian Military Merit Medal in Silver with Swords (World War I award)
- Austrian Military Merit Medal in Bronze with Swords (World War I award)
- 1914 Iron Cross 2nd Class (World War I award)
- Karl Troop Cross (World War I award)
- Austria-Hungary Wound Medal (World War I award)
- Panzer Badge in Silver
- Wehrmacht Long Service Award 1st Class

Military offices
Preceded by Generalleutnant Franz Landgraf	Commander of 155. Reserve-Panzer-Division; 24 August 1943 – 6 September 1943	Succeeded by Generalleutnant Franz Landgraf
