= Hans Hecker =

- Born: 26 February 1895; Duisburg-Meiderich
- Died: 1 May 1979 (aged 84) near Hannoversch Münden
- Military career
- Allegiance: German Empire; Weimar Republic; Nazi Germany
- Branch: Army (Wehrmacht)
- Service years: 1914–1919; 1924–1945
- Rank: Generalmajor
- Commands: 345th Infantry Division; 26. Panzer-Division; 3rd Infantry Division
- Conflicts: World War I: World War II; Invasion of Poland; Battle of France; Operation Barbarossa; Battle of Białystok–Minsk; Battle of Smolensk (1941); Battle of Moscow; North African Campaign; Battle of Gazala; First Battle of El Alamein; Second Battle of El Alamein; Battle of Anzio; Operation Diadem; Battle of Metz
- Awards: Knight's Cross of the Iron Cross

Hans Hecker (26 February 1895 – 1 May 1979) was a German general during World War II who commanded several divisions. He was a recipient of the Knight's Cross of the Iron Cross of Nazi Germany.

== Awards and decorations ==
- Knight's Cross of the Iron Cross on 5 August 1940 as Oberstleutnant and commander of Pionier-Battalion 29 (mot.)

Military offices
Preceded by General der Panzertruppe Smilo Freiherr von Lüttwitz	Commander of 26. Panzer-Division; 22 January 1944 – 20 February 1944	Succeeded by General der Panzertruppe Smilo Freiherr von Lüttwitz
Preceded by General der Panzertruppe Fritz-Hubert Gräser	Commander of 3. Panzergrenadier-Division; March 1944 – 1 June 1944	Succeeded by Generalleutnant Hans-Günther von Rost
