= Max von Hartlieb-Walsporn =

German general (1883–1959)

- Born: 20 October 1883; Hienheim, Kingdom of Bavaria, German Empire
- Died: 25 July 1959 (aged 75); Starnberg, Bavaria, West Germany
- Military career
- Allegiance: German Empire (to 1918); Weimar Republic (to 1933); Nazi Germany
- Service years: 1904–1945
- Rank: Generalleutnant
- Commands: 5th Panzer Division; 179th Reserve Panzer Division
- Conflicts: World War I World War II: Battle of France

Max von Hartlieb-Walsporn (20 October 1883 – 25 July 1959) was a German army officer who served as a Wehrmacht general during the Second World War.

Hartlieb-Walsporn commanded the 5th Panzer Brigade in the early fall of 1939, then took charge of the 5th Panzer Division on 8 October 1939. As commander of this division, he participated in the Battle of France of 1940, but he came to be seen as a weak leader when the lightly defended French town of Le Quesnoy was able to resist his armoured forces for some four days. By May 28, he was in reserve; later in 1940, he was given command of the 179th Division, but in January 1942 he was again relegated to reserve or administrative posts and never again commanded front-line troops.

Wounded on 19 May 1942, Hartlieb-Walsporn was hospitalized for almost five months and spent several more months in reserve before accepting other administrative posts over the remainder of the war. After the war ended, he was captured as a prisoner of war and imprisoned for two years.

== Military awards ==
- Iron Cross (1914) 2nd Class & 1st Class
- Clasp to the Iron Cross (1939) 2nd Class & 1st Class
