= Friedrich Polack =

German educationist and author

See Fritz Polack for the WWII era general.

Friedrich Polack (1835–1915) was a German educationist and author. He was born in Flarchheim, Province of Saxony, educated in Erfurt and worked as a teacher in Schierschwenda, Kammerforst, Erfurt and Nordhausen. From 1876 until his retirement in 1904, he was district school inspector in Worbis. After 1904, he was active as author of school books on history, science and literature. He founded the journal Pädagogische Brosamen in 1898, acting as editor until 1906.

== Bibliography ==
- 1883, Jugendleben
- 1883, Geschichtsbilder aus der allgemeinen und vaterländischen Geschichte
- 1896–1890 Brosamen, Erinnerungen aus dem Leben eines Schulmannes (autobiographical, 3 vols.)
- 1887, Amtsleben in der Stadt
- 1888, Aus meiner Jugendzeit
- 1896, Philipp Melanchthon, Deutschlands Lehrer und Luthers Freund und Mithelfer : Bilder aus seinem Leben und Wirken; Zur Jubelfeier von Melanchthons 400jähr. Geburtstage (16. Februar 1897)
- 1905, Unser Schiller : zur hundertsten Wiederkehr von Schillers Todestage
- Geschichtsleitfaden für Bürger- und Mittelschulen (with Sattler)
- Illustriertes Realienbuch
- Kleines Realienbuch (with Machold, 2 vols.)

Editor

- 1880–1905, Aus deutschen Lesebüchern (with Dietlein, Frick, Machold, Richter, 6 vols.)
- 1881, Historische Gedichte Für Schule und Haus
- 1885, Epische und lyrische Dichtungen erläutert für die Oberklassen der höheren Schulen und für das deutsche Haus (with Otto Frick)
- 1887, Lyrische Dichtungen
- 1889, Aus der Jugend für die Jugend (fairy tales)
- 1912, Dichtungen in Poesie und Prosa für die Unterstufe
