= Tessin, Germany =

Town in Mecklenburg-Vorpommern, Germany

Tessin
- Town
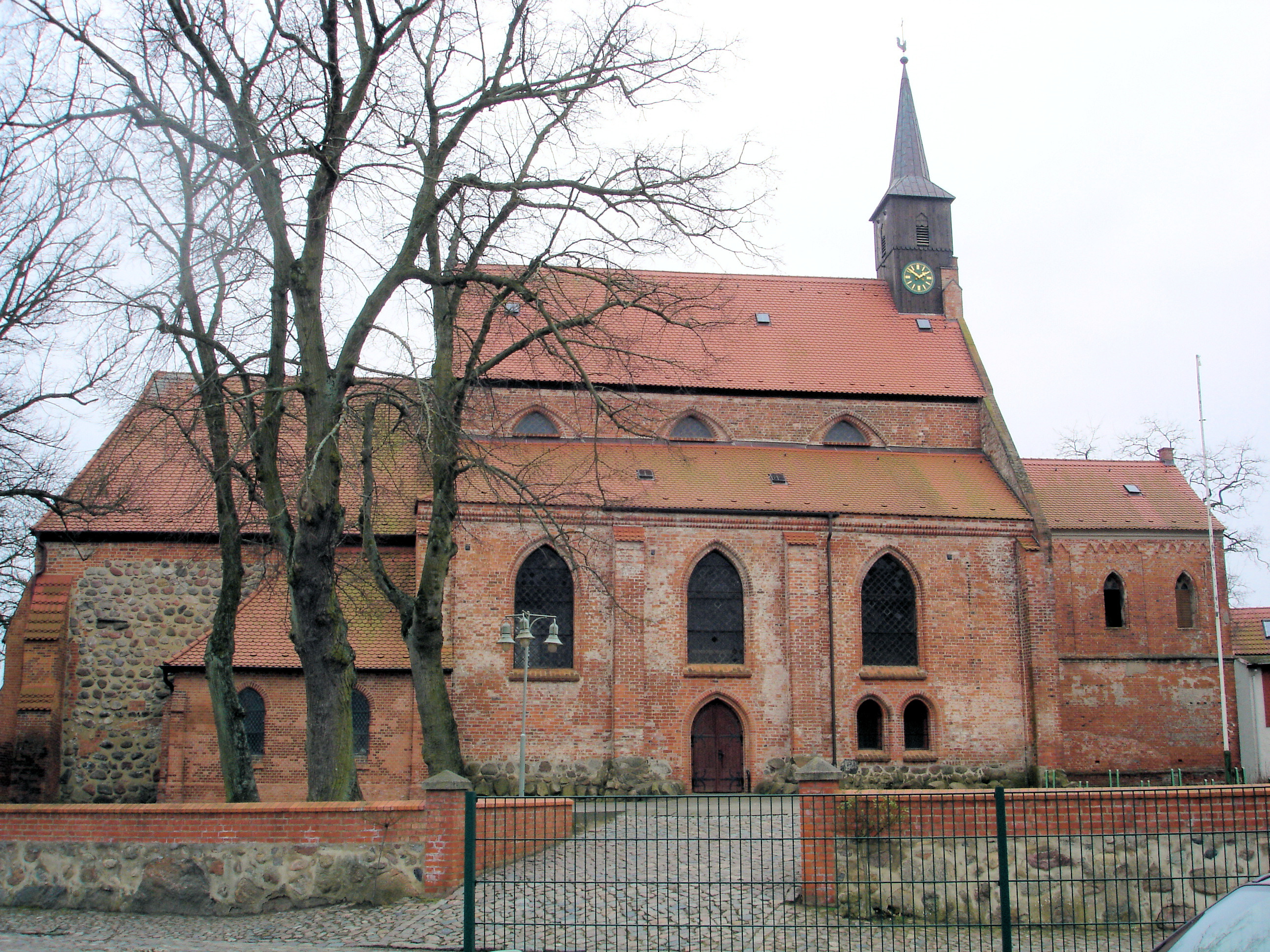
- Church in Tessin

- Coat of arms

- Location of Tessin within Rostock district
- Interactive map of Tessin
- Location within Germany Location within Mecklenburg-Vorpommern
- Coordinates: 54°1′N 12°28′E
- Country: Germany
- State: Mecklenburg-Vorpommern
- District: Rostock
- Municipal assoc.: Tessin

Government
  - Mayor: Fred Ibold

Area
  - Total: 24.51 km^{2} (9.46 sq mi)
- Elevation: 15 m (49 ft)

Population (2025-12-31)
  - Total: 4,174
  - Density: 170.3/km^{2} (441.1/sq mi)
- Time zone: UTC+01:00 (CET)
  - Summer (DST): UTC+02:00 (CEST)
- Postal codes: 18195
- Dialling codes: 038205
- Vehicle registration: LRO
- Website: www.tessin.de

Tessin (German pronunciation: [tɛˈsiːn]) is a town in the Rostock district, in Mecklenburg-Western Pomerania, Germany. It is situated on the river Recknitz, 22 km east of Rostock.

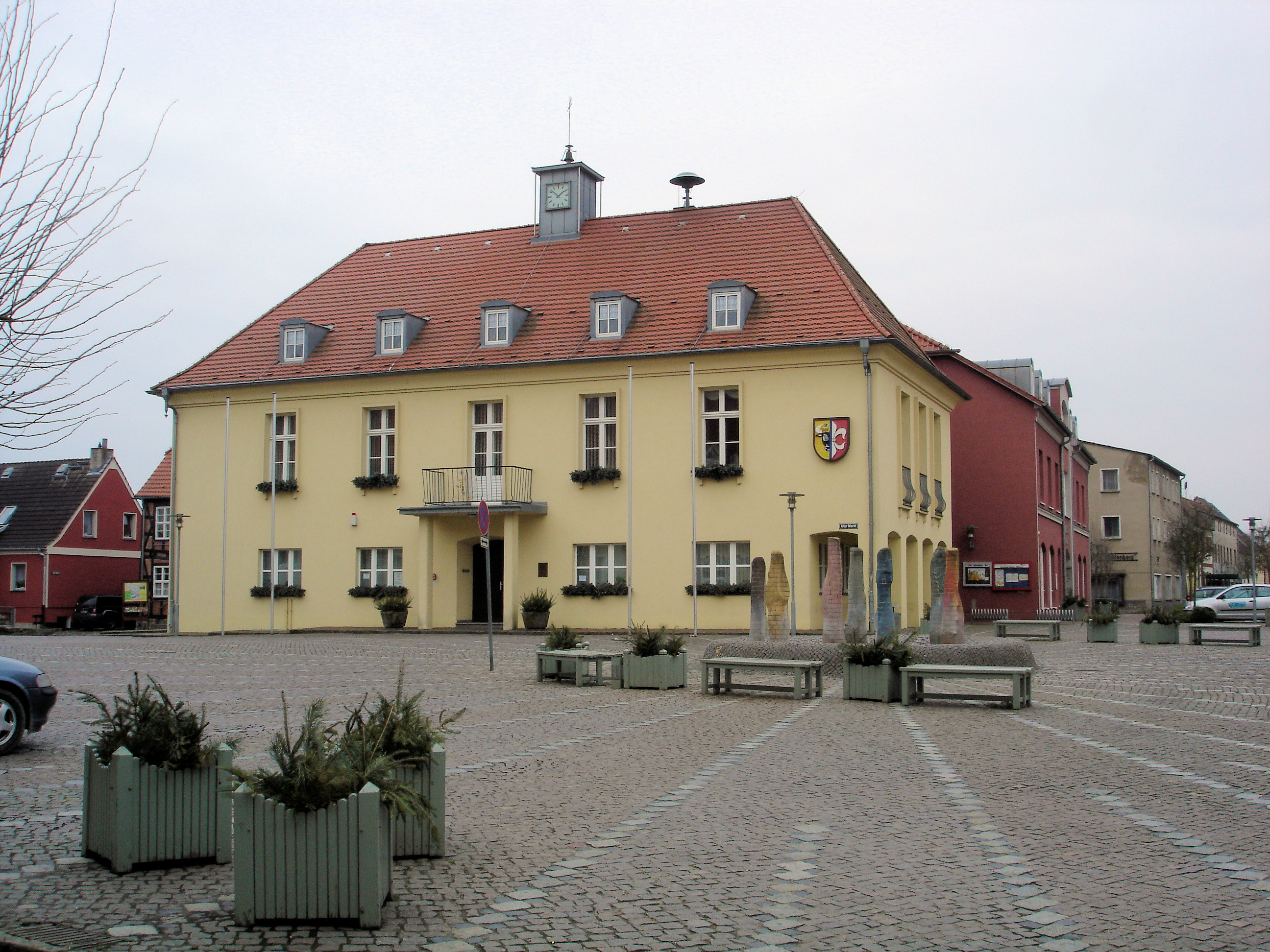
Tessin Town hall

== Notable people ==
- Ernst Heydemann (1876–1930), German politician and from 1919 to 1930 mayor and Lord Mayor of the Hansestadt Rostock.
- Carl Heydemann (1878–1939), the last Lord Mayor in the Hansestadt Stralsund before the takeover of the National Socialists.
- Roland Methling (born 1954), engineer, Lord Mayor of the Hansestadt Rostock since 2005
