= 179th =

179th is the ordinal form of the number 179. 179th or One hundred and seventy-ninth may also refer to:

- A fraction, 1/179, equal to one of 179 equal parts

== Geography ==
- 179th meridian east, a line of longitude
- 179th meridian west, a line of longitude

== Military ==
- 179th Brigade (disambiguation)
- 179th Reserve Panzer Division, Wehtmacht
- 179th Reserve Panzer Division, Red Army
- 179th Regiment (disambiguation)

== See also ==
- June 28, 179th day of the year in a standard year
