= Franz Landgraf =

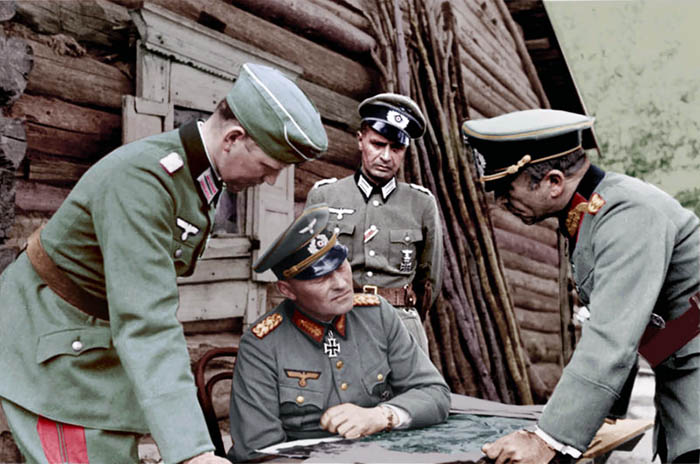
- Franz Landgraf standing at the right
- Born: 16 July 1888
- Died: 19 April 1944 (aged 55)
- Military career
- Allegiance: German Empire; Weimar Republic; Nazi Germany
- Branch: Army
- Service years: 1909–1944
- Rank: Generalleutnant
- Commands: 6th Panzer Division; 155th Reserve Panzer Division
- Conflicts: World War I World War II: Annexation of Austria; Battle of France; Operation Barbarossa; Baltic Operation; Battle of Raseiniai; Siege of Leningrad; Battle of Moscow; Battles of Rzhev
- Awards: Knight's Cross of the Iron Cross

Franz Landgraf (16 July 1888 – 19 April 1944) was a general in the Wehrmacht of Nazi Germany during World War II. He was a recipient of the Knight's Cross of the Iron Cross.

During the invasion of the Soviet Union he led the 6th Panzer Division in the Baltic Region, fighting a battle at Raseiniai.

He died in Stuttgart on 19 April 1944.

== Awards and decorations ==
- Knight's Cross of the Iron Cross on 16 June 1940 as Oberst and commander of 4. Panzer-Brigade

Military offices
Preceded by General der Panzertruppe Werner Kempf	Commander of 6. Panzer-Division; 6 January 1941 - June 1941	Succeeded by General der Panzertruppe Wilhelm Ritter von Thoma
Preceded by General der Panzertruppe Wilhelm Ritter von Thoma	Commander of 6. Panzer-Division; 15 September 1941 - 1 April 1942	Succeeded by Generalleutnant Erhard Raus
Preceded by None	Commander of 155. Reserve-Panzer-Division; 1 August 1943 – 23 August 1943	Succeeded by Generalmajor Curt von Jesser
Preceded by Generalmajor Curt von Jesser	Commander of 155. Reserve-Panzer-Division; 6 September 1943 – 30 September 1943	Succeeded by Generaleutnant Max Fremerey
