= Viktor Linnarz =

German military officer (1894–1979)

Viktor Leopold Linnarz
- Born: 19 August 1894; Alfeld, Lower Saxony
- Died: 14 October 1979 (aged 85); Weiden in der Oberpfalz, Bavaria
- Military career
- Allegiance: German Empire (to 1918); Weimar Republic (to 1933); Nazi Germany
- Branch: Army
- Service years: 1914–1945
- Rank: Generalleutnant
- Commands: 26. Panzer-Division
- Conflicts: World War I World War II; *Operation Barbarossa; *Spring 1945 offensive in Italy
- Awards: German Cross in Silver

Generalleutnant Viktor Leopold Linnarz (19 August 1894 – 14 October 1979) was a German army officer who served in the Prussian Army in World War I and the German Army during World War II.

He joined the Prussian Army in March 1914 and was awarded the Iron Cross during his service in World War I. At the outbreak of World War II in September 1939 he was an Oberstleutnant. He was promoted to Oberst (colonel) in 1940 and served as a brigade commander in the 3rd Panzer Division from 27 June 1941 to August 1941. In 1942 he was appointed the Deputy Chief of the Army Personnel Office (HPA) at the Army High Command (OKH). On 1 January 1943 he was promoted to Generalmajor (Major General) and on 1 April 1944 to Generalleutnant (lieutenant general). On 21 July 1944 he arrived at the country home of Generalfeldmarschall Erwin von Witzleben, having been ordered to arrest him following his involvement in the 20 July plot coup attempt.

Linnarz was the commander of the 26th Panzer-Division in Italy from 1 March to 8 May 1945. He surrendered his division to the British and was held in the prisoner-of-war camp at Ghedi, Italy where he made a posthumous award of a Knight's Cross of the Iron Cross to a major in a Panzergrenadier regiment without authority. Linnarz was interrogated about his wartime role and recollections on 25 February 1948. He died aged 85 in 1979 in Weiden in der Oberpfalz.

== Awards ==
- Iron Cross (1914)
- Clasp to the Iron Cross (1939)
- German Cross in Silver (15 January 1945)
