= Selpin =

- Municipality
- Location of Selpin within Rostock district
- Interactive map of Selpin
- Location within Germany Location within Mecklenburg-Vorpommern
- Coordinates: 53°59′N 12°29′E
- Country: Germany
- State: Mecklenburg-Vorpommern
- District: Rostock
- Municipal assoc.: Tessin

Government
  - Mayor: Benno Bredemeier (CDU)

Area
  - Total: 32.99 km^{2} (12.74 sq mi)
- Elevation: 44 m (144 ft)

Population (2025-12-31)
  - Total: 546
  - Density: 16.6/km^{2} (42.9/sq mi)
- Time zone: UTC+01:00 (CET)
  - Summer (DST): UTC+02:00 (CEST)
- Postal codes: 18195
- Dialling codes: 038205
- Vehicle registration: LRO
- Website: Amt Tessin

Selpin is a municipality in the Rostock district, in Mecklenburg-Vorpommern, Germany.
