= Zarnewanz =

- Municipality
- Location of Zarnewanz within Rostock district
- Interactive map of Zarnewanz
- Location within Germany Location within Mecklenburg-Vorpommern
- Coordinates: 54°3′N 12°30′E
- Country: Germany
- State: Mecklenburg-Vorpommern
- District: Rostock
- Municipal assoc.: Tessin

Government
  - Mayor: Bodo Waldbauer

Area
  - Total: 15.31 km^{2} (5.91 sq mi)
- Elevation: 40 m (130 ft)

Population (2025-12-31)
  - Total: 458
  - Density: 29.9/km^{2} (77.5/sq mi)
- Time zone: UTC+01:00 (CET)
  - Summer (DST): UTC+02:00 (CEST)
- Postal codes: 18195
- Dialling codes: 038205
- Vehicle registration: LRO
- Website: www.zarnewanz.de

Zarnewanz is a municipality in the Rostock district, in Mecklenburg-Vorpommern, Germany.
