= Fritz Polack =

- Born: 22 October 1892; Gera, German Empire
- Died: 6 April 1956 (aged 63); England
- Military career
- Allegiance: Nazi Germany
- Branch: Army
- Service years: 1911–1920; 1934–1945
- Rank: Generalleutnant
- Commands: 29. Panzergrenadier Division
- Conflicts: World War I World War II: Invasion of Poland; Battle of the Caucasus; Operation Husky; Gothic Line Offensive; Spring 1945 offensive in Italy; Battle of the Argenta Gap
- Awards: Knight's Cross of the Iron Cross

See Friedrich Polack for the educationist.

Fritz Polack (22 October 1892 – 6 April 1956) was a highly decorated Generalleutnant in the Wehrmacht during World War II. He was also a recipient of the Knight's Cross of the Iron Cross. General Polack surrendered to the US 85th Infantry Division at La Stanga, Italy, near Belluno.

== Biography ==
He served in the Saxon Fußartillerie-Regiment Nr. 10 from 1911, promoted to lieutenant in 1912 and to the first lieutenant in 1916. He was discharged in 1920 and studied political economy at Erfurt University, completing a doctorate (Dr. rer. pol.). He re-joined the army as a captain in 1934, serving in Artillerie-Regiment 29, then promoted to major in 1937.

In 1938 he became commander of the third division of Artillerie Regiment 29 in Kassel, participating in the Invasion of Poland in the summer of 1939. He was promoted to lieutenant colonel in 1940, serving as commander of Artillerie-Lehr-Regiment 2. Promoted to colonel in 1942, he commanded Panzer Artillerie Regiment 140, active in the southern part of the eastern front. He retired from command in December 1942 but was reactivated in March 1943 as commander of Artillerie Regiment (motorisiert) 29 as part of the "Italy Group". For his service in Sicily he was decorated with the Knight's Cross of the Iron Cross in 1943.

Polack was promoted to major general in 1944, commanding the 29th Panzer Grenadier Division, and finally promoted to lieutenant general on 15 March 1945. He was nominated to receive the Knight's Cross of the Iron Cross with Oak Leaves, the award was announced and confirmed by OB 10th Armee under the command of General der Panzertruppe Traugott Herr, who stated that he received approval to make the award after a telephone inquiry to HPA Traunstein. Polack received his Oak Leaves on 30 April 1945.

He was a POW until he was released in October 1947. He resumed his career as a professor in political science and died from a stroke while visiting England in 1956.

== War crimes ==
In the final days of the war, on 29 April 1945, the 29th Panzergrenadier Division, commanded by Polack, was involved in the San Martino di Lupari massacre, where it used Italian civilians as human shields against partisan attacks and eventually executed 125 hostages. The Military Prosecutor of Padua investigated the massacre and Polack's involvement in 1960 and, again, in 1995.

== Awards and decorations ==
- Iron Cross (1914)
  - 2nd Class (6 September 1914)
  - 1st Class (16 November 1916)
- Wound Badge (1914)
  - in Black
- Honour Cross of the World War 1914/1918
- Clasp to the Iron Cross (1939)
  - 2nd Class (25 September 1939)
  - 1st Class (5 December 1942)
- Knight's Cross of the Iron Cross on 27 August 1943 as Oberst and commander of Artillerie-Regiment 29 (motorized)
- Oak Leaves on 30 April 1945 as Generalleutnant and commander of the 29. Panzergrenadier-Division.

Military offices
Preceded by General der Panzertruppe Walter Fries	Commander of 29. Panzergrenadier Division; 24 August 1944 – 24 April 1945	Succeeded by None
