= Padule di Fucecchio massacre =

1944 war crime in Italy

- Part of War crimes of the Wehrmacht
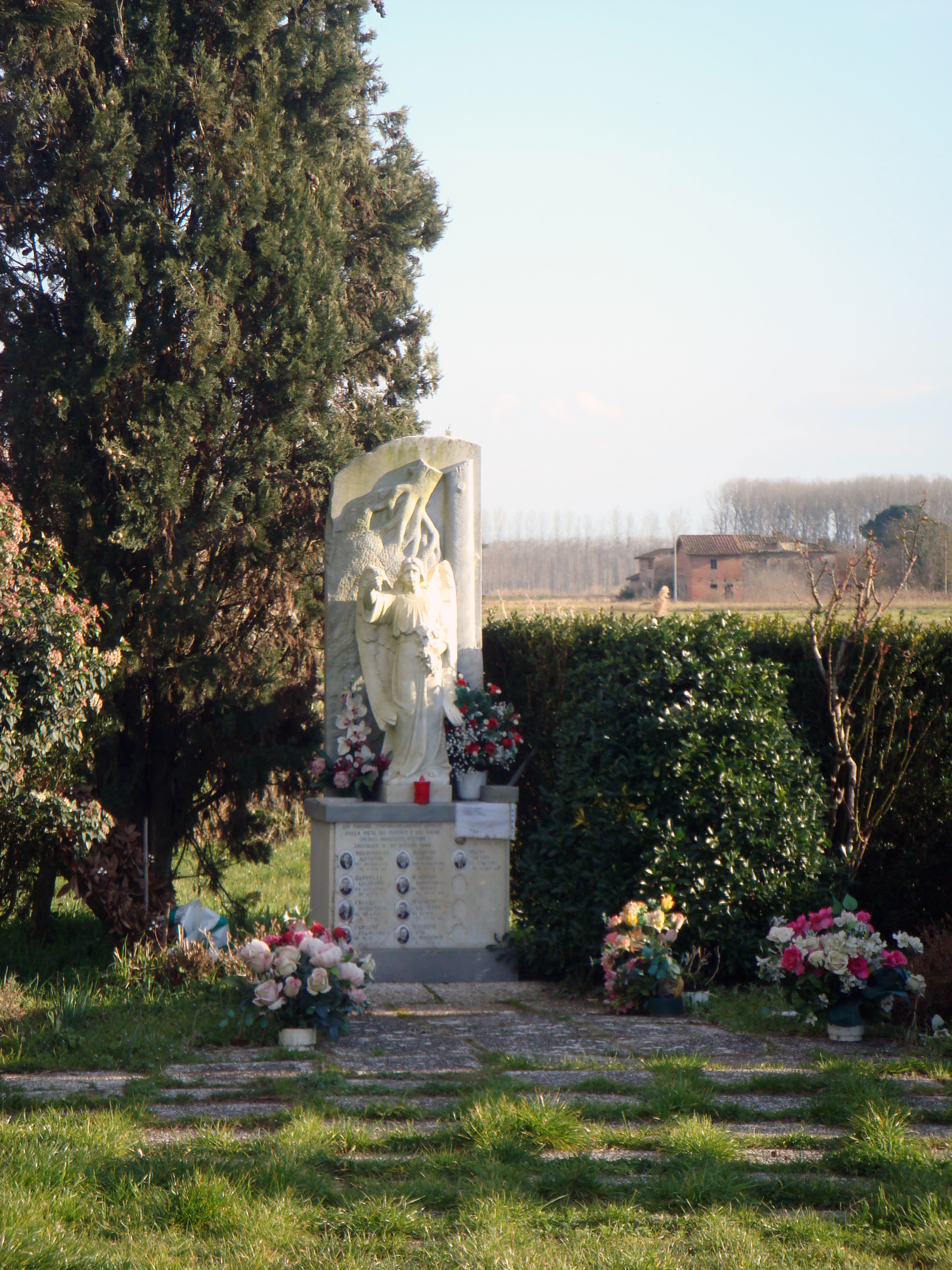
- A memorial to the massacre at Ponte Buggianese

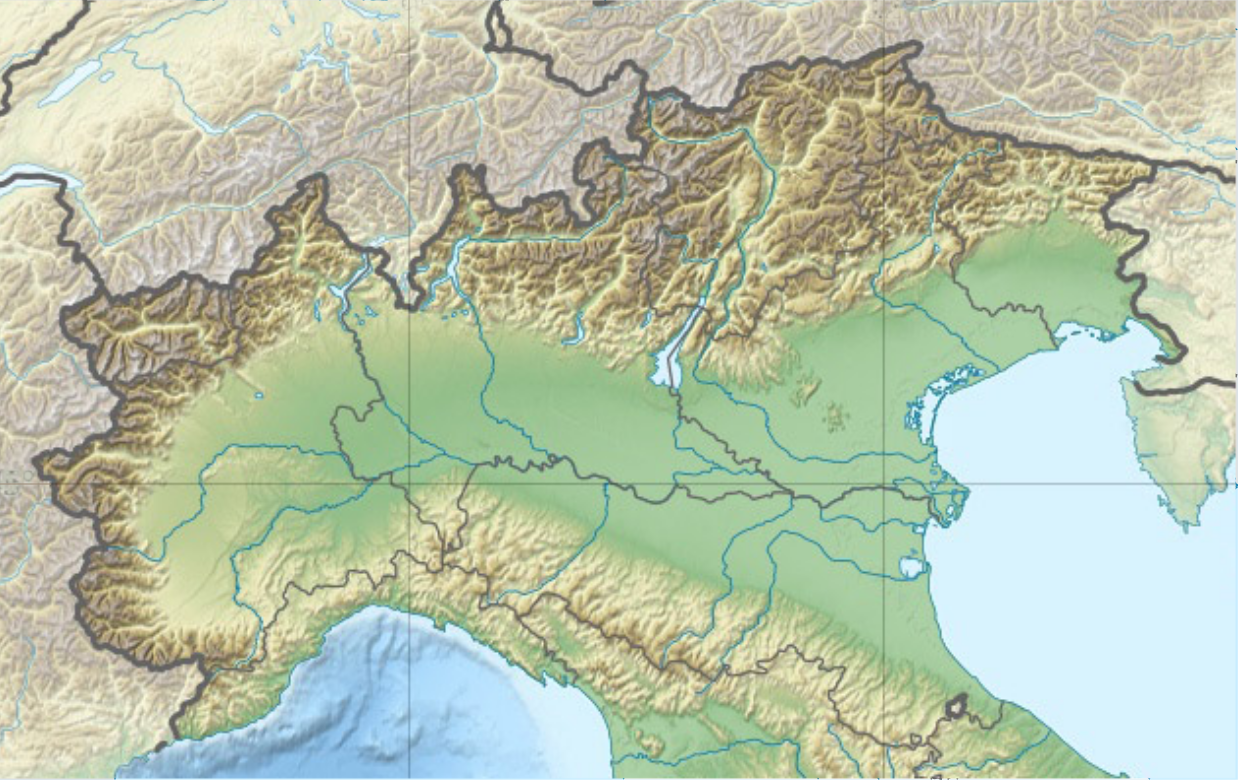
- Padule di Fucecchio massacre (Northern Italy)
- Native name: Eccidio del Padule di Fucecchio
- Location: 43°48′N 10°48′E; Padule di Fucecchio, Tuscany, Italy
- Date: 23 August 1944
- Target: Italian civilian population
- Attack type: Massacre
- Weapon: Machine guns
- Deaths: At least 174
- Perpetrators: Ernst Pistor, Fritz Jauss, Johan Robert Riss, Gerhard Deissmann: Eduard Crasemann
- Motive: Reprisal for Italian partisan activity
- Inquiry: Sergeant Charles Edmondson
- Charges: Murder
- Verdict: Crasemann: 10 years (died in prison in 1950) Pistor, Jauss, and Riss: Life imprisonment (in absentia): Germany ordered to pay €14 million
- Convicted: Crasemann (1947); Pistor, Jauss, and Riss (2011)
- Website: L'Eccidio del Padule di Fucecchio

The Padule di Fucecchio massacre (Italian: Eccidio del Padule di Fucecchio) was the murder of at least 174 Italian civilians, (Note: Estimates for the number of victims vary. News articles about the 2011 trial state 184, the Italian government stated 175 in 2015, while the commemorative site and the Atlas of Nazi and Fascist Massacres in Italy state 174.) carried out by the 26th Panzer Division at Padule di Fucecchio, a large wetland north of Fucecchio, Tuscany, on 23 August 1944. After the war, the commander of the 26th Panzer Division was sentenced for war crimes, but the men who carried out the massacre were not convicted until 2011 and none served any jail time. The massacre has been described as "one of the worst Nazi atrocities in Italy".

== Massacre ==
The massacre was carried out as a reprisal for the wounding of two German soldiers by Italian partisans. An Italian military court was later told that the Germans had rounded up 94 men, 63 women and 27 children and murdered them with machine gun fire. According to the prosecutor, the murders were committed "in cold blood, looking the innocent in the eyes". An Italian historian described the massacre as "not a reprisal but an operation of total desertification".

== Prosecution ==
=== Initial investigation ===
British military police Sergeant Charles Edmondson investigated the massacre in 1945. He took statements from survivors. This evidence was used decades later, after Edmondson's death in 1985, in the prosecution of some of the perpetrators.

Edmondson established that the massacre was carried out by soldiers of the 26th Panzer Division. The division was commanded by Eduard Crasemann at the time, who was sentenced to 10 years' imprisonment for war crimes by a British military court. He died in a West German prison in 1950.

=== Trial ===
In 2011, a military court in Italy tried four of the suspected perpetrators and found three of them guilty while the fourth one died during the trial. Ernst Pistor (Captain), Fritz Jauss (Warrant officer), and Johan Robert Riss (Sergeant) were found guilty while Gerhard Deissmann died before the sentencing, aged 100. The three were unlikely to serve time in jail because Germany was not obliged to extradite them. None of the three showed any remorse for their action. Some of the perpetrators of the massacre were also accused of participating in the murder of the family of Robert Einstein.

=== Compensation ===
Marco De Paolis, the military prosecutor in the case, asked Germany to pay €14 million in compensation to 32 relatives of the victims but Germany denied liability, citing immunity agreements with Italy in 1947 and 1961.

== Commemoration ==
In 2015, the Italian Foreign Minister, Paolo Gentiloni, together with his German counterpart Frank-Walter Steinmeier, who would later serve as President of Germany, opened a Documentation Centre on the Padule di Fucecchio Massacre. The official press release by the Italian Ministry of Foreign Affairs and International Cooperation puts the number of victims in the massacre at 175.
