= 155th Reserve Panzer Division =

- 155. Reserve-Panzerdivision
- Active: 10 May 1942 - 30 April 1944
- Disbanded: 30 April 1944
- Country: Nazi Germany
- Branch: Army
- Type: Panzer
- Role: Armoured warfare
- Size: Division
- Garrison/HQ: Ludwigsburg

The 155th Reserve Panzer Division (German 155. Reserve-Panzer-Division) was formed by redesignation of Panzer-Division Nr.155 in August 1943. The division was stationed in France from August 1943 to April 1944 when it was absorbed by 9th Panzer Division.

== Commanders ==
- Generalleutnant Franz Landgraf (1 Aug 1943-23 Aug 1943)
- Generalmajor Curt von Jesser (24 Aug 1943-6 Sep 1943)
- Generalleutnant Franz Landgraf (7 Sep 1943-30 Sep 1943)
- Generaleutnant Max Fremerey (1 Oct 1943-30 Apr 1944)

== Area of operations ==
France (August 1943 - April 1944)

== Order of battle ==
- Reserve Panzer Abteilung 7
- Reserve Panzergrandier Regiment 5
- Reserve Grenadier Regiment (mot) 25
- Reserve Artellerie Abteilung (mot) 260
- Reserve Aufklarungs Abteilung (mot) 9
- Reserve Panzerjager Abteilung 5
- Reserve Panzer Nachrichten Kompanie 1055
- Reserve Panzer Versorgungstruppen
