= XII SS Corps =

XII SS Army Corps
- Active: August 1944 – April 1945
- Country: Germany
- Branch: Waffen-SS
- Size: Corps
- Engagements: World War II

The XII SS Army Corps was a corps of the Waffen-SS. It saw action on both the Western and Eastern Fronts during World War II.

== History ==
The corps was formed on 1 August 1944 in Silesia from the remnants of Kampfgruppe von Gottberg and the LIII Army Corps, and added to the 3rd Panzer Army. From September 1944, it fought in the Western Front as part of the 1st Parachute Army. Later it fought under the 15th Army on the Siegfried Line and the Ruhr Front. The corps was surrounded and destroyed in the Ruhr pocket in April 1945.

== Commanders ==
- 1 August 1944: SS-Obergruppenführer und General der Waffen-SS Matthias Kleinheisterkamp
- 6 August 1944: SS-Obergruppenführer und General der Waffen-SS Curt von Gottberg
- 18 October 1944: SS-Obergruppenführer und General der Waffen-SS Karl Maria Demelhuber
- 20 October 1944: General der Infanterie Günther Blumentritt
- 20 January 1945: Generalleutnant Fritz Bayerlein
- 29 January 1945: Generalleutnant Eduard Crasemann

== Orders of battle ==
16 September 1944

- 548th Grenadier Division
- 7th Panzer Division

1 March 1945

- 176th Infantry Division
- 183rd Volksgrenadier Division
- 338th Infantry Division
- Panzer-Lehr-Division

== Sources ==
- Rolf Stoves: Die gepanzerten und motorisierten deutschen Großverbände 1935–1945. Ed. Dörfler im Nebel-Verlag, Eggolsheim 2003, ISBN 3-89555-102-3
