= Karl Maria Demelhuber =

German Waffen-SS commander, SS-Obergruppenführer

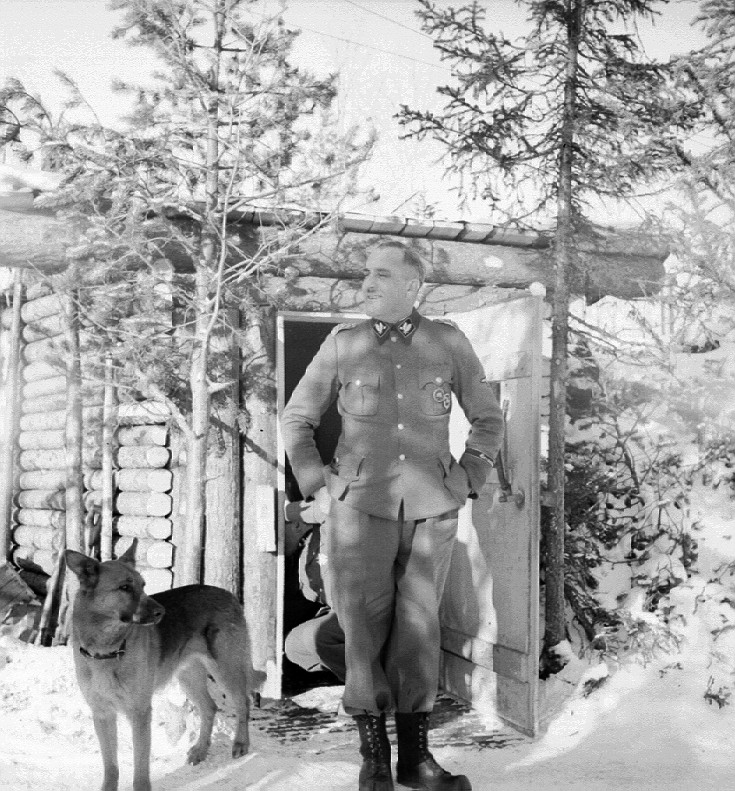
- Demelhuber in 1942
- Born: 26 May 1896; Freising, German Empire
- Died: 18 March 1988 (aged 91); Seeshaupt, West Germany
- Military career
- Allegiance: German Empire; Weimar Republic; Nazi Germany
- Branch: Waffen-SS
- Service years: 1914–1945
- Rank: SS-Obergruppenführer and General of the Waffen-SS
- Commands: SS-Standarte Germania; 6th SS Mountain Division Nord; XII SS Corps; XVI SS Corps
- Awards: German Cross in Silver; Order of the Cross of Liberty 1st class

Karl Maria Demelhuber (26 May 1896 – 18 March 1988) was a German SS functionary during the Nazi era.

Reaching the rank of Obergruppenführer (general) in the Waffen-SS during World War II, he commanded the SS-Standarte Germania, 6th SS Mountain Division Nord, XII SS Corps and XVI SS Corps.

== See also ==
- List SS-Obergruppenführer

Military offices
Preceded by SS-Brigadeführer Karl Herrmann	Commander of 6. SS-Gebirgs-Division Nord; 15 May 1941 – September 1941	Succeeded by SS-Obergruppenführer Georg Keppler
Preceded by SS-Obergruppenführer Georg Keppler	Commander of 6. SS-Gebirgs-Division Nord; October 1941 – 1 April 1942	Succeeded by SS-Obergruppenführer Matthias Kleinheisterkamp
Preceded by SS-Obergruppenführer Curt von Gottberg	Commander of XII. SS-Armeekorps; 18 October 1944 – 20 October 1944	Succeeded by General der Infanterie Günther Blumentritt
Preceded by none	Commander of XVI. SS-Armeekorps; January 1945 – February 1945	Succeeded by dissolved in February 1945
