= Walter von Boltenstern =

German general (1889–1952)

- Born: 26 November 1889; Breslau
- Died: 19 January 1952 (aged 62); Voikovo prison camp, Soviet Union
- Military career
- Allegiance: German Empire; Weimar Republic; Nazi Germany
- Branch: Army
- Service years: 1910–1945
- Rank: Generalleutnant
- Commands: 29th Motorized Infantry Division; 179th Reserve Panzer Division
- Conflicts: World War I World War II
- Awards: Knight's Cross of the Iron Cross

Walter von Boltenstern (26 November 1889 – 19 January 1952) was a German general in the Wehrmacht of Nazi Germany during World War II who commanded several divisions. He was a recipient of the Knight's Cross of the Iron Cross.

Boltenstern joined the Royal Prussian Army in 1910 and fought in World War I as a junior officer. He was awarded the Iron Cross, 1st and 2nd class, the Military Merit Order of Bavaria, 4th class with swords and the Hanseatic Cross of Hamburg. After the end of the war, he remained in the peacetime Reichswehr. He fought in World War II as a divisional commander. Boltenstern was discharged from active service in early 1945 and, later that year, was taken prisoner by the Soviet Red Army. He died in Soviet captivity at the Voikovo prison camp in 1952.

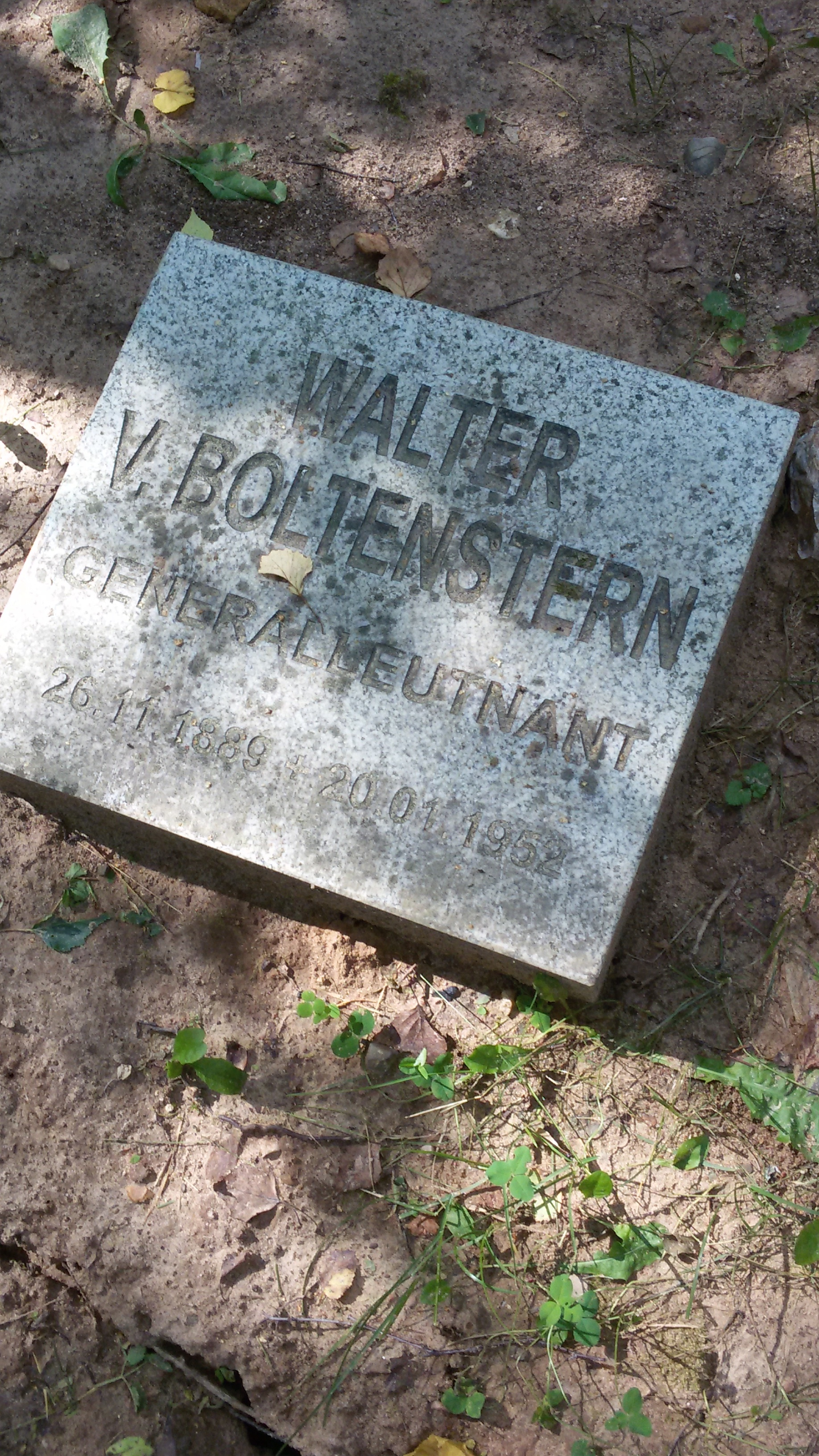
Grave in Cherntsy

== Awards and decorations ==
- Knight's Cross of the Iron Cross on 13 August 1941 as Generalmajor and commander of 29.Infanterie-Division (mot.)

Military offices
| Preceded by Generalmajor Willibald Freiherr von Langermann und Erlencamp | Commander of 29. Infanterie-Division (mot.); 1 July 1940 – 20 September 1941 | Succeeded by Generalmajor Max Fremerey |
