= Tessin (Amt) =

Amt in Rostock, Mecklenburg-Vorpommern, Germany

- Amt
- Map of Rostock highlighting Tessin
- Interactive map of Tessin
- Location within Germany Location within Mecklenburg-Vorpommern
- Coordinates: 54°02′N 12°30′E
- Country: Germany
- State: Mecklenburg-Vorpommern
- District: Rostock
- Seat: Tessin
- Subdivisions: 9 municipalities

Area
  - Total: 173.86 km^{2} (67.13 sq mi)

Population (2025-12-31)
  - Total: 7,306
  - Density: 42.02/km^{2} (108.8/sq mi)
- Time zone: UTC+01:00 (CET)
  - Summer (DST): UTC+02:00 (CEST)
- Website: stadt-tessin.de/amt-tessin

Tessin is an Amt in the district of Rostock, in Mecklenburg-Vorpommern, Germany. The seat of the Amt is in Tessin.

The Amt Tessin consists of the following municipalities:

1. Cammin
2. Gnewitz
3. Grammow
4. Nustrow
5. Selpin
6. Stubbendorf
7. Tessin
8. Thelkow
9. Zarnewanz
