= XVI SS Corps =

XVI SS Army Corps
- Active: January 1945 – February 1945
- Country: Germany
- Branch: Waffen-SS
- Size: Corps

The XVI SS Army Corps was a short-lived corps of the Waffen-SS, which was formed in January 1945 in Pomerania.

The core of the corps was the 1st Latvian SS Division. It fought in the Piła (Schneidemühl) - Bydgoszcz (Bromberg) area against the Soviet East Prussian offensive and was dissolved in February after the retreat from that area.

== Commanders ==
The corps' only commander was SS-Obergruppenführer Karl Maria Demelhuber.

== Sources ==
- okh.it
- Axis History
- Rolf Stoves: "Die gepanzerten und motorisierten deutschen Großverbände 1935—1945", Nebel-Verlag, 2003, ISBN 3-89555-102-3
