= Cammin, Rostock =

Cammin
- Municipality
- Location of Cammin within Rostock district
- Interactive map of Cammin
- Location within Germany Location within Mecklenburg-Vorpommern
- Coordinates: 53°58′N 12°20′E
- Country: Germany
- State: Mecklenburg-Vorpommern
- District: Rostock
- Municipal assoc.: Tessin

Government
  - Mayor: Michael Hahn

Area
  - Total: 32.15 km^{2} (12.41 sq mi)
- Elevation: 42 m (138 ft)

Population (2025-12-31)
  - Total: 853
  - Density: 26.5/km^{2} (68.7/sq mi)
- Time zone: UTC+01:00 (CET)
  - Summer (DST): UTC+02:00 (CEST)
- Postal codes: 18195
- Dialling codes: 038205
- Vehicle registration: LRO
- Website: Amt Tessin

Cammin (German pronunciation: [kaˈmiːn]) is a municipality in the Rostock district, in Mecklenburg-Vorpommern, Germany.

== Notable people ==
- Gustav Bachmann (1860–1943) a German naval officer and an admiral in World War I

== Gallery ==
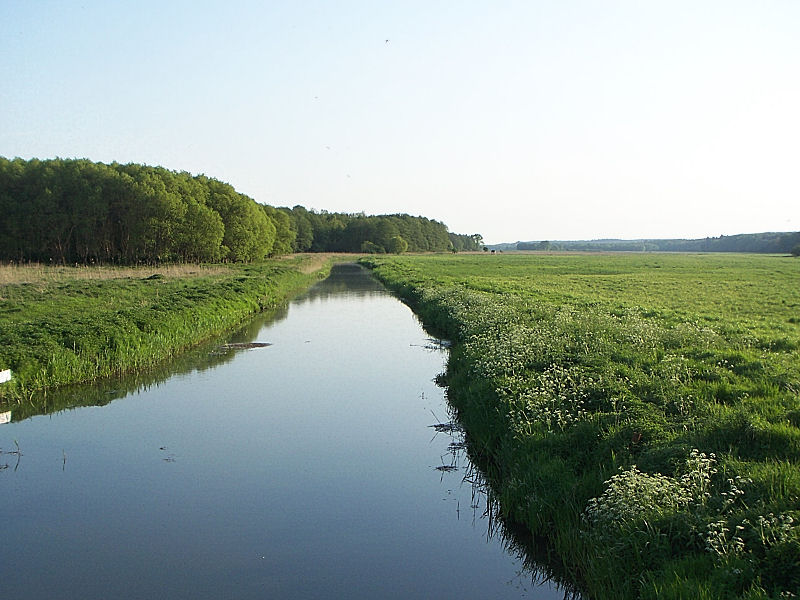
Recknitz river valley at Cammin

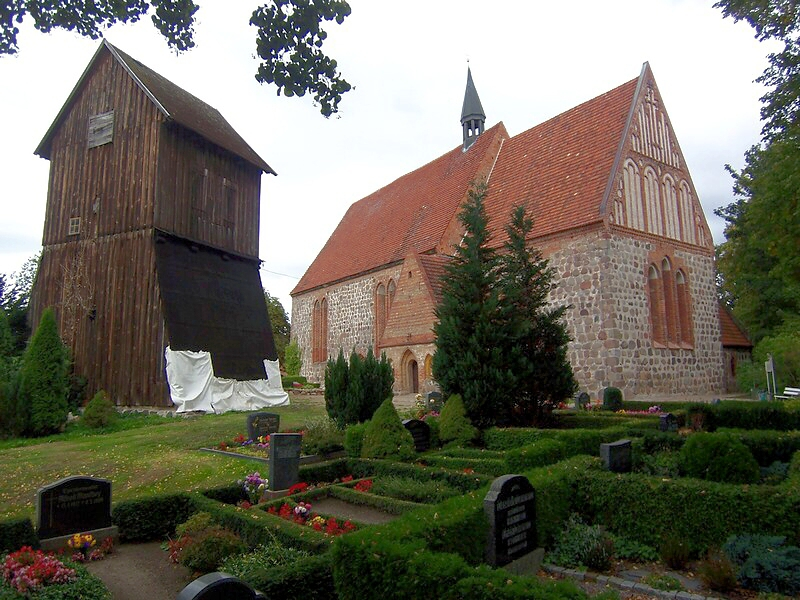
Brick Gothic church of Cammin

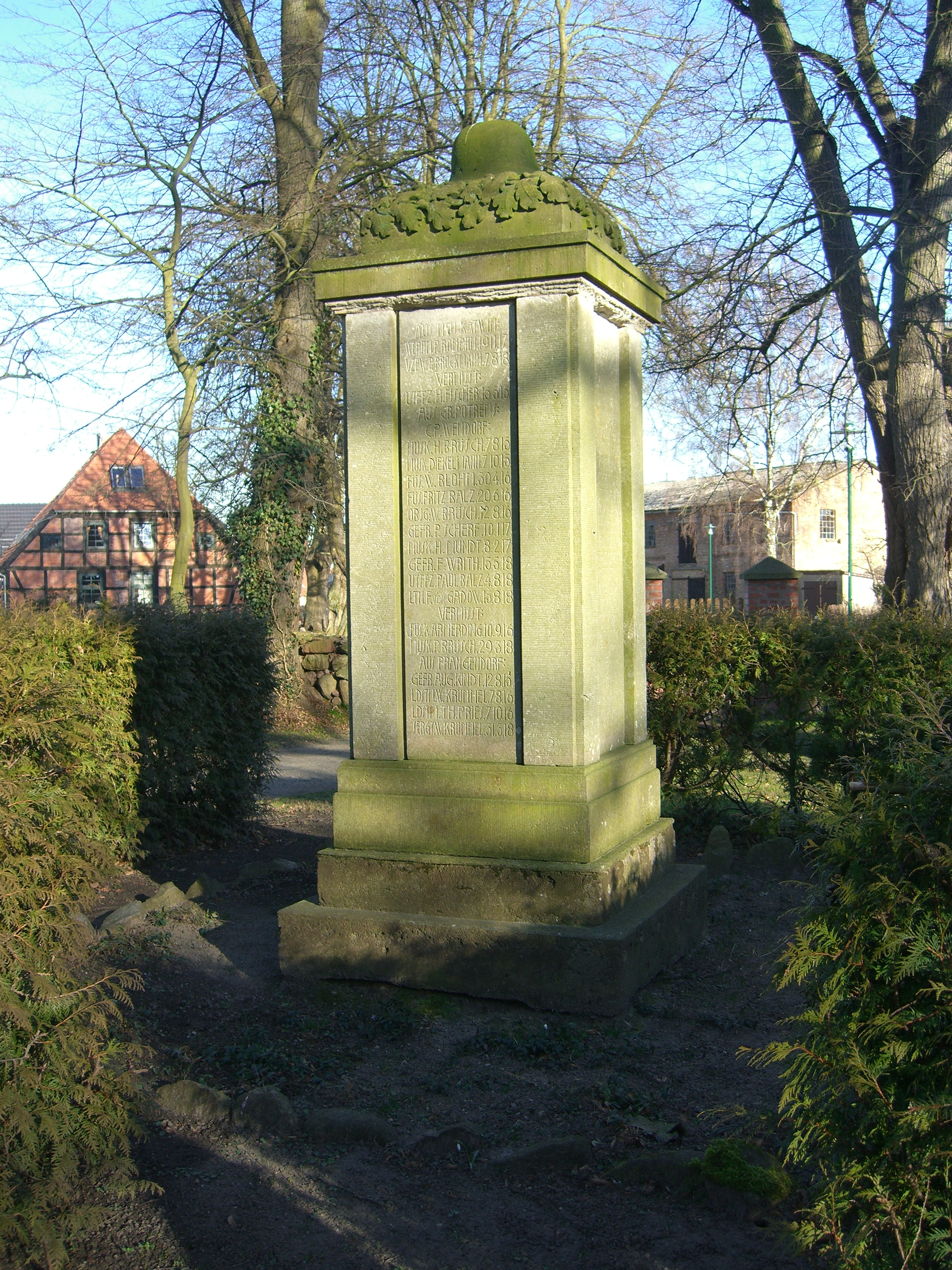
World War I memorial in Cammin

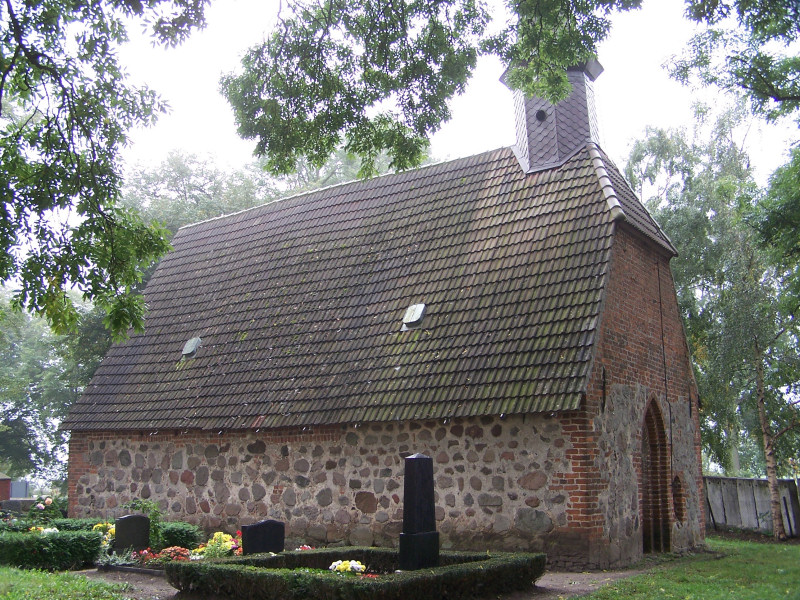
Weitendorf church
