= Gnewitz =

- Municipality
- Location of Gnewitz within Rostock district
- Interactive map of Gnewitz
- Location within Germany Location within Mecklenburg-Vorpommern
- Coordinates: 54°4′N 12°30′E
- Country: Germany
- State: Mecklenburg-Vorpommern
- District: Rostock
- Municipal assoc.: Tessin

Government
  - Mayor: Frank Barnick

Area
  - Total: 10.09 km^{2} (3.90 sq mi)
- Elevation: 38 m (125 ft)

Population (2025-12-31)
  - Total: 267
  - Density: 26.5/km^{2} (68.5/sq mi)
- Time zone: UTC+01:00 (CET)
  - Summer (DST): UTC+02:00 (CEST)
- Postal codes: 18195
- Dialling codes: 038228
- Vehicle registration: LRO
- Website: Amt Tessin

Gnewitz is a municipality in the Rostock district, in Mecklenburg-Vorpommern, Germany. It is located 30 kilometres east of Rostock.
