= 23rd Infantry Division (Wehrmacht) =

German army division during World War II

German 23rd Infantry Division
- 23. Infanteriedivision (23. InfDiv )
- Unit insignia, based on Frederick II of Prussia's monogram
- Active: 1 October 1934 – 14 September 1942; 23 October 1942 – 8 May 1945
- Country: Germany
- Branch: Army
- Type: Infantry
- Size: Division
- Garrison/HQ: Potsdam, Wehrkreis III
- Nickname: Grenadierkopf

Insignia
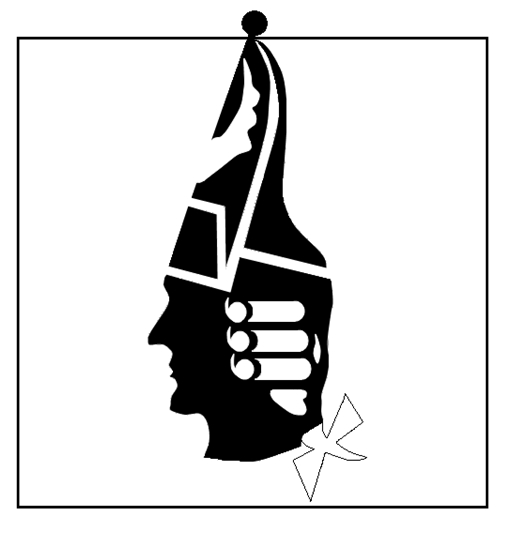
- Identification symbol

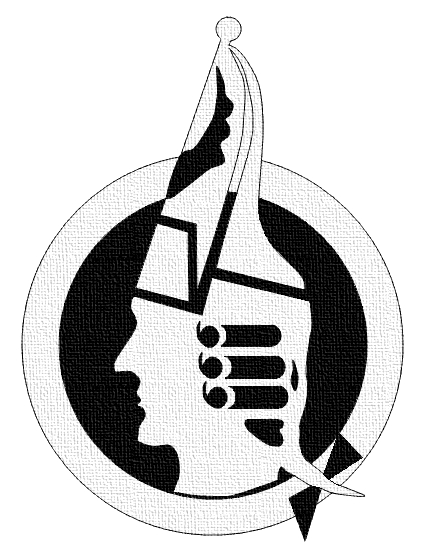
- As the 26th Panzer Division

The German 23rd Infantry Division (23. Infanterie-Division), later the 26th Panzer Division, was a military unit operational during World War II. It was organized along standard lines for a German infantry division. It was non-motorised and relied on horse-drawn wagons for its mobility. The unit carried the nickname Grenadierkopf ("grenadier head").

The 23rd Infantry participated in the invasion of Poland in 1939 as part of the reserve component of the 4th Army. The division was commanded by Walter Graf von Brockdorff-Ahlefeldt and consisted of the 9th, 67th, and 68th infantry regiments.

Some members of the division, particularly from the 9th Infantry Regiment like Henning von Tresckow or Philipp von Bismarck, were part of the July 20 plot against Adolf Hitler.

== Commanding officers ==
- Generalleutnant Ernst Busch, creation – 4 February 1938
- General der Infanterie Walter Graf von Brockdorff-Ahlefeldt, 4 February 1938 – 1 June 1940
- Generalleutnant Heinz Hellmich, 1 June 1940 – 17 January 1942
- Generalleutnant Curt Badinski, 17 January 1942 – 9 July 1942

== 26th Panzer Division ==
In July 1942, the division was reorganized as the 26th Panzer Division (26. Panzer-Division). It then served occupation duties in the west until mid-1943, whereupon it transferred to Italy to resist the Allied invasion, fought at Salerno, and remained in Italy for the rest of the war, surrendering to the British near Bologna at the end.

26th Panzer Division in 1943 consisted of the following units. 26th Panzer regiment, 9th Panzer Grenadier regiment, 67th Panzer Grenadier regiment, 93rd Panzer Artillery regiment, 26th Motorcycle battalion, 93rd Panzerjaeger battalion, 93rd Panzer Engineer battalion, 93rd Panzer Signals battalion, 304th Army Flak artillery battalion.

Soldiers of the division, then commanded by Eduard Crasemann, were involved in the Padule di Fucecchio massacre on 23 August 1944. Crasemann was sentenced to 10 years imprisonment for war crimes after the war and died in jail in West Germany in 1950.

=== Commanding officers ===
- General der Panzertruppe Smilo Freiherr von Lüttwitz, 14 September 1942
- Generalmajor Hans Hecker, 22 January 1944
- General der Panzertruppe Smilo Freiherr von Lüttwitz, 20 February 1944
- Oberst Dr. rer. pol. Dr. jur. Hans Boelsen, 11 April 1944 – 7 May 1944 (deputy)
- Generalleutnant Eduard Crasemann, 6 July 1944
- Oberst Carl Stollbrock, 15 December 1944 - 15 January 1945 (deputy)
- Generalmajor Alfred Kuhnert, 29 January 1945
- Generalleutnant Viktor Linnarz, 19 April 1945

== New 23rd Infantry Division ==
In November 1942 a new 23rd Infantry Division was formed, with the new 9th and 67th regiments called Grenadier to distinguish them from the original 9th and 67th regiments now called Panzergrenadier in the 26th Panzer Division. This new division served on the Eastern Front for the remainder of the war, ultimately surrendering in East Prussia.

=== Commanding officers ===
- Generalmajor Friedrich von Schellwitz, re-creation - August 1943
- General der Artillerie Horst von Mellenthin, August 1943 - 1 September 1943
- Generalleutnant Paul Gurran, 1 September 1943 - 22 February 1944
- Generalleutnant Walter Chales de Beaulieu, 22 February 1944 - 1 August 1944
- Generalleutnant Hans Schirmer, 1 August 1944 - disbanded

== See also ==
- German order of battle for Operation Fall Weiss
- List of German divisions in World War II
- SS Panzer Division order of battle
- Panzer division
