= Grammow =

- Municipality
- Location of Grammow within Rostock district
- Interactive map of Grammow
- Location within Germany Location within Mecklenburg-Vorpommern
- Coordinates: 54°2′N 12°37′E
- Country: Germany
- State: Mecklenburg-Vorpommern
- District: Rostock
- Municipal assoc.: Tessin

Government
  - Mayor: Elisabeth Terpstra- van der Velde

Area
  - Total: 16.20 km^{2} (6.25 sq mi)
- Elevation: 24 m (79 ft)

Population (2025-12-31)
  - Total: 164
  - Density: 10.1/km^{2} (26.2/sq mi)
- Time zone: UTC+01:00 (CET)
  - Summer (DST): UTC+02:00 (CEST)
- Postal codes: 18195
- Dialling codes: 038205
- Vehicle registration: LRO
- Website: Amt Tessin

Grammow is a municipality in the Rostock district, in Mecklenburg-Vorpommern, Germany.
