= Gustav von Vaerst =

German general during World War II

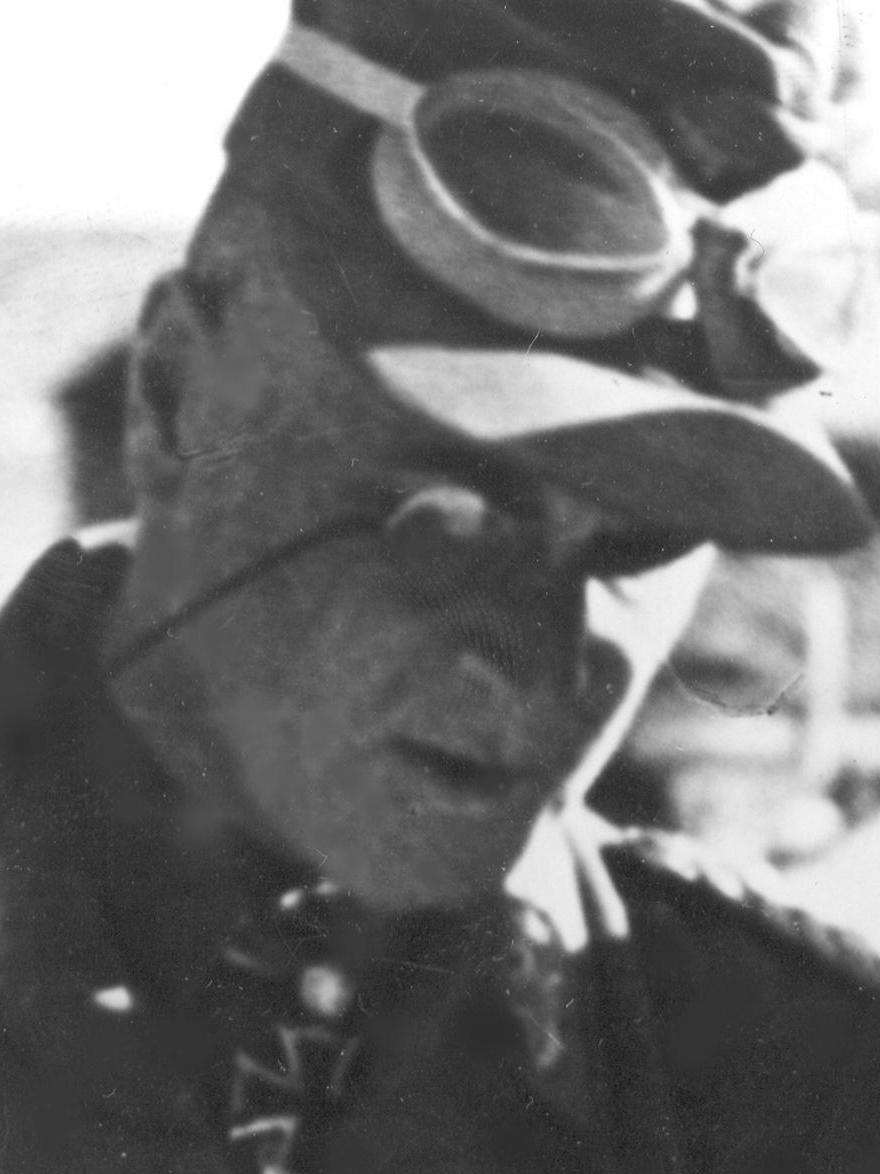
- Born: 19 April 1894
- Died: 10 October 1975 (aged 81)
- Military career
- Allegiance: Nazi Germany
- Branch: German Army
- Rank: General der Panzertruppe
- Conflicts: World War I World War II
- Awards: Knight's Cross of the Iron Cross

Gustav von Vaerst (19 April 1894 – 10 October 1975) was a German general during World War II.

He was the last commander of the 5th Panzer Army, which was trapped in Northern Tunisia, between 28 February and 9 May 1943. He surrendered with his army to the British and Americans and was held in captivity until his release in 1947.

== Awards and decorations ==
- Prussia: Iron Cross (1914)
- Nazi Germany: Knight's Cross of the Iron Cross

Military offices
Preceded by Generalleutnant Erwin Menny	Commander of 15. Panzer-Division; 9 December 1941 – 26 May 1942	Succeeded by Generalleutnant Eduard Crasemann
Preceded by Generalleutnant Heinz von Randow	Commander of 15. Panzer-Division; 25 August 1942 – 11 November 1942	Succeeded by Generalleutnant Willibald Borowietz
Preceded by Generaloberst Hans-Jürgen von Arnim	Commander of 5th Panzer Army; 28 February 1943 – 9 May 1943	Succeeded by None (Surrender)
