= 29th Infantry Division (Wehrmacht) =

29th Infantry Division 29th Panzergrenadier Division
- 29. Infanterie-Division; 29. Panzergrenadier-Division
- Active: 1 October 1936 – 2 May 1945
- Country: Nazi Germany
- Branch: Army
- Type: Panzergrenadier
- Role: Bandenbekämpfung; Maneuver warfare Raiding
- Size: Division
- Nickname: Falcon Division
- Engagements: World War II: Invasion of Poland; Operation Barbarossa; Moscow; Battle of Stalingrad

The 29th Infantry Division was a unit of the German army created in autumn 1936. It was based on the old Reichswehr 15th Infantry Regiment and drew its initial recruits from Thuringia. It was upgraded to 29th Motorized Infantry Division in autumn 1937. The division was also known as the Falke-Division (Falcon Division).

== Operational history ==
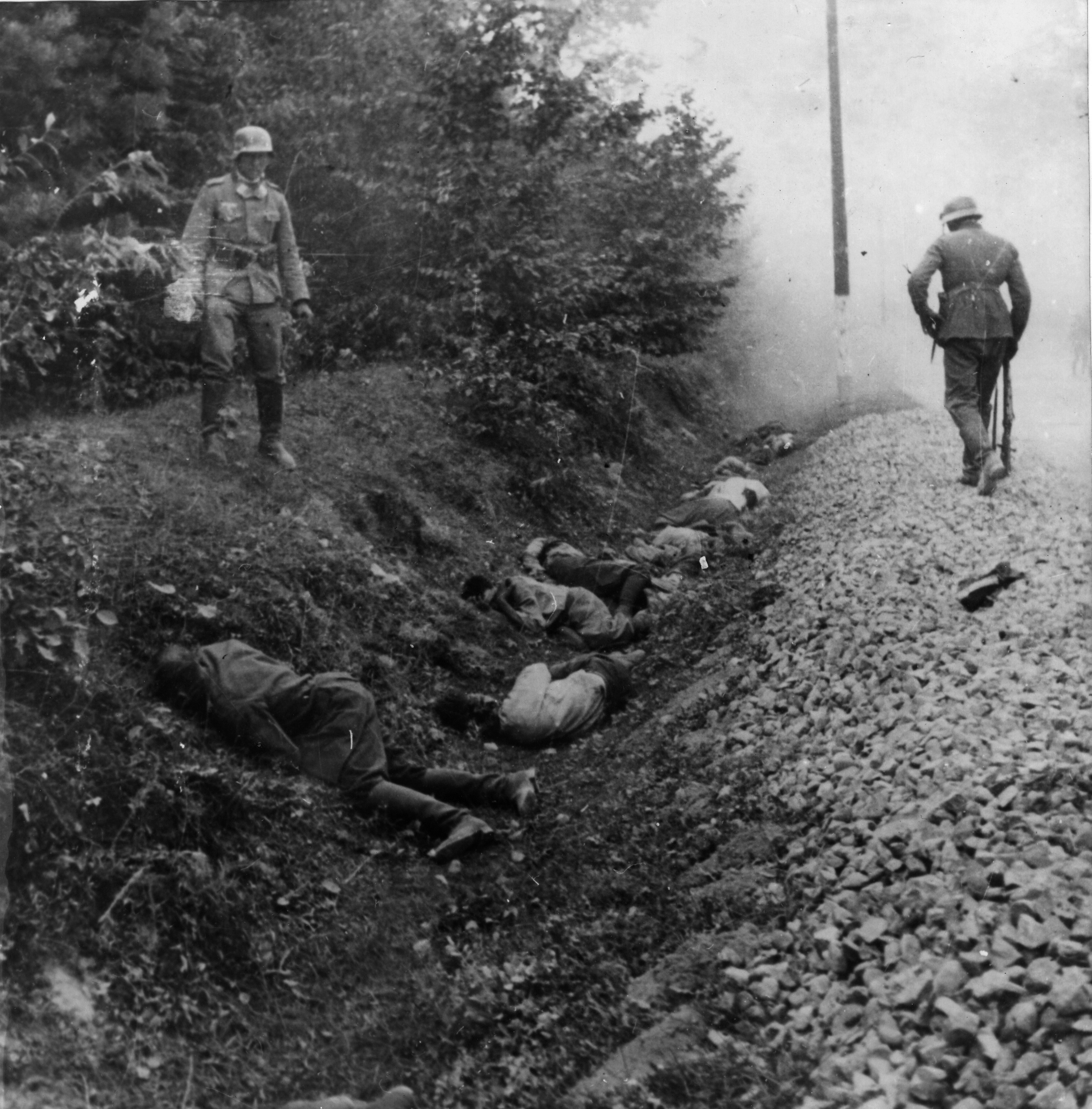
German soldiers of the 15th Regiment of 29th Infantry Division after the execution of Polish civilians during the Invasion of Poland, 9 September 1939.

The division was mobilized in August 1939 and joined the XIV Corps of the German 10th Army for the invasion of Poland.

On 8 September 1939, forces of the 29th Infantry Division occupied Lipsko, where members of the division's 71st Infantry Regiment's third battalion staged a pogrom on 9 September, killing between 60 and 80 Jewish inhabitants of the town.

The division took part in the encirclement of Polish forces at Radom, Poland and committed the Massacre in Ciepielów, where about 300 Polish prisoners of war were executed.

In December 1939 it was transferred to the west. During the invasion of France it joined the 16th Army. As a strategic reserve it was used during the drive for the English Channel. After the Dunkirk evacuation it joined Heinz Guderian's Panzer Group for an advance through eastern France. It was then employed in occupation duties until early 1941.

Taking part in Operation Barbarossa it was attached to the German 4th Army and took part in a number of actions against isolated Soviet formations at Minsk, Smolensk and Bryansk. It was then sent to support Guderian's 2nd Panzer Army near Tula. The division lost most of its vehicles and many killed and captured during the retreat from Moscow at Mordves, south of Kashira in the Moscow oblast. In 1942 it spent the first 6 months in action near Orel and then in July 1942 was assigned to the German 6th Army as part of Army Group South. It took part in the fighting on the approaches to Stalingrad, and in the city itself. It was redeployed to serve as the 4th Panzer Army's mobile reserve at the end of September, and relocated behind the IV Corps guarding the southern flank of the 6th Army forces in Stalingrad.

When the Red Army's second pincer attack was launched from the south, the division was pushed into the south-west corner of the pocketed German forces. Having been held in reserve for most of the Stalingrad campaign, the division was at 90% combat strength according to its situation reports. On 21 January 1943 it was attacked by the Soviet 21st Army, and was destroyed.

It was then reconstituted in France in the early spring from the recently formed 345th Infantry Division. It was transferred to the Sicilian Campaign as the 29th Panzergrenadier Division for sometime in the defence of the Northern Route to Messina. Thereafter it fought in Italy at Salerno, Anzio, and San Pietro and was destroyed by the British in northern Italy just before the end of the war.

In the final days of the war, on 29 April 1945, the division was involved in the San Martino di Lupari massacre, where it used Italian civilians as human shields against partisan attacks and eventually executed 125 hostages.

== Organization ==
Structure of the division in 1944:

- Headquarters
- 29th Panzer Battalion
- 15th Grenadier Regiment
- 71st Grenadier Regiment
- 29th Motorized Artillery Regiment
- 129th Panzer Reconnaissance Battalion
- 29th Tank Destroyer Battalion
- 29th Motorized Engineer Battalion
- 29th Motorized Signal Battalion
- 313th Army Anti-Aircraft Battalion
- 29th Field Replacement Battalion
- 29th Panzergrenadier Division Supply Group

== Commanding officers ==
- Generalleutnant Gustav Anton von Wietersheim, 1 October 1936 – 1 March 1938
- Generalleutnant Joachim Lemelsen, 1 March 1938 – 7 May 1940
- Generalmajor Willibald Freiherr von Langermann und Erlencamp, 7 May 1940 – 7 September 1940
- Generalmajor Walter von Boltenstern, September 1940 – September 1941
- General Max Fremerey, September 1941 – September 1942
- General Hans-Georg Leyser, September 1942 – February 1943
- General der Panzertruppe Walter Fries, 1 March 1943 – 5 March 1943
- Oberst Dr. Hans Boelsen 5 March 1943 – 20 March 1943
- General der Panzertruppe Walter Fries 20 March 1943 – 31 August 1944
- Generalleutnant Dr. Fritz Polack, 24 August 1944 – 24 April 1945
