= LI Mountain Corps =

- LI. Gebirgs-Armeekorps
- Active: 15 August 1943 – 8 May 1945
- Country: Germany

The LI Mountain Corps was a German military formation in World War II.

== History ==
The LI Mountain Corps was formed on 15 August 1943 at Vienna in Wehrkreis XVII. Its staff came from the LI Army Corps, which had been destroyed in the Battle of Stalingrad.

The unit fought in Italy and participated in the Fourth Battle of Monte Cassino (May 1944), on the Trasimene Line (June 1944), on the Gothic Line (August 1944 - March 1945) and in Operation Grapeshot (April 1945).
It surrendered at Brescia in May 1945.

== Commanders ==
- General of Mountain troops Valentin Feurstein (25 August 1943 - January 1945)
- General of the Artillery Friedrich-Wilhelm Hauck (January 1945 - 8 May 1945)

== Sources ==
- LI. Gebirgs-Armeekorps sur lexikon-der-wehrmacht.de
