= Hans Boelsen =

German military general (1894-1960)

- Born: 6 March 1894; Emden, German Empire
- Died: 24 October 1960 (aged 66); Frankfurt am Main, West Germany
- Military career
- Allegiance: German Empire (to 1918); Weimar Republic (to 1919); Nazi Germany
- Branch: Army (Wehrmacht)
- Service years: 1914–1919; 1934–1945
- Rank: Generalleutnant
- Commands: 29th Panzer Grenadier Division; 26th Panzer Division; 114th Jäger Division; 18th Panzergrenadier Division
- Conflicts: World War I World War II
- Awards: Knight's Cross of the Iron Cross

Hans Boelsen (6 March 1894 – 24 October 1960) was a general in the Wehrmacht of Nazi Germany during World War II. He was a recipient of the Knight's Cross of the Iron Cross. During his time in command of the 114th Jäger Division, the unit was complicit in two massacres in Italy, in the towns of Filetto di Camarda and Gubbio. Boelsen was never prosecuted for these crimes.

== Awards and decorations ==
- German Cross in Gold on 17 November 1941 as Oberstleutnant in Kradschützen-Bataillon 160 (motorized)
- Knight's Cross of the Iron Cross on 17 September 1943 as Oberst and commander of Panzergrenadier-Regiment 111

Military offices
Preceded by Generalleutnant Walter Fries	Commander of 29th Panzergrenadier Division; 5 March 1944 – 20 March 1944	Succeeded by Generalleutnant Walter Fries
Preceded by General der Panzertruppe Smilo Freiherr von Lüttwitz	Commander of 26th Panzer Division; 11 April 1944 – 7 May 1944	Succeeded by Generalleutnant Eduard Crasemann
Preceded by Generalleutnant Alexander Bourquin	Commander of 114th Jäger Division; 19 May 1944 – 19 July 1944	Succeeded by Generalmajor Hans-Joachim Ehlert
Preceded by Generalleutnant Karl-Ludwig Zutavern	Commander of 18th Panzergrenadier Division; 10 September 1944 – 1 January 1945	Succeeded by Generalmajor Josef Rauch
