= Operation Diadem =

Pivotal battle in the Italian campaign, leading to the Allied liberation of Rome

- Part of the Winter Line and the battle for Rome of the Italian campaign, World War II
- Allied plan for Operation Diadem
| Date | 11 May to 4 June 1944 |
| Location | Liri Valley, Italy |
| Result | Allied victory |

Belligerents
| United Kingdom: (British Raj) British India; United States; Free France (Polish government-in-exile) Poland; Canada | Germany; Italian Social Republic |

Commanders and leaders
| (United Kingdom) Sidney Kirkman (United States) Geoffrey Keyes (Polish government-in-exile) Władysław Anders (Free France) Alphonse Juin | (Nazi Germany) F. v. Senger und Etterlin (Nazi Germany) Valentin Feurstein (Nazi Germany) Traugott Herr (Nazi Germany) Eberhard von Mackensen |

Units involved
| (United Kingdom) XIII Corps (United States) II Corps (Polish government-in-exile) II Corps (Free France) CEFI | (Nazi Germany) XIV Panzer Corps (Nazi Germany) LI Mountain Corps (Nazi Germany) LXXVI Panzer Corps (elements) |

Operation Diadem, also referred to as the Fourth Battle of Monte Cassino or, in Canada, the Battle of the Liri Valley, was an offensive operation undertaken by the Allies of World War II (U.S. Fifth Army and British Eighth Army) in May 1944, as part of the Italian Campaign of World War II. Diadem was supported by air attacks called Operation Strangle. The opposing force was the German 10th Army.

The object of Diadem was to break the German defenses on the Gustav Line (the western half of the Winter Line) and open up the Liri Valley, the main route to Rome. General Sir Harold Alexander, Commander-in-Chief of the Allied Armies in Italy, planned Diadem to coordinate roughly with the invasion of Normandy, so that German forces would be tied down in Italy, and could not be redeployed to France.

Four corps were employed in the attack. From right to left these were the Polish II Corps and the British XIII Corps, of the Eighth Army, and the French Corps (including Moroccan Goumiers) and the U.S. II Corps, of the Fifth Army. The Fifth Army also controlled the U.S. VI Corps in the Anzio beachhead, some 60 miles northwest.

Diadem was launched at 23:00 on 11 May 1944 by elements of the British 4th Infantry Division and 8th Indian Infantry Division, with supporting fire from the 1st Canadian Armoured Brigade. They made a successful strongly opposed night crossing of the Garigliano and Rapido rivers. This broke into the heart of the German defenses in the Liri valley against strong opposition and drew in German theater reserves, reducing pressure on the Anzio beachhead. The French Corps pushed through the mountains to the left on 14 May, supported by U.S. II Corps along the coast. On 17 May, Polish II Corps on the right attacked Monte Cassino.

When their position collapsed, the Germans fell back from the Gustav Line to the Hitler Line some 10 miles to their rear.

On 23 May, the four corps attacked the Hitler Line. On the same day, the U.S. VI Corps attacked out of the Anzio beachhead.

The Hitler Line was breached by the 1st Canadian Infantry Division's 4th Princess Louise Dragoon Guards at Pontecorvo on 23 May. The German Tenth Army was forced to retire northwestward. The U.S. VI Corps, moving northeast from Anzio, was at the point of cutting off the German line of retreat when Lieutenant General Mark W. Clark, commander of the Fifth Army, inexplicably ordered them to turn northwest and advance on Rome instead. There is much speculation that he did this so that his Fifth Army would capture Rome ahead of the Eighth Army advancing up the Liri Valley. The German Tenth Army thus avoided being surrounded.

The Germans fought a series of delaying actions, retired to the Trasimene Line, and then to the Gothic Line (identified on German maps as the "Green" Line), north of the Arno River.

== Gustav line ==
In his autobiography, General Mark W. Clark describes how the French Expeditionary Corps (FEC) broke through the Gustav Line in May 1944.

Meantime, the French forces had crossed the Garigliano (River) and moved forward into the mountainous terrain lying south of the Liri River. It was not easy. As always, the German veterans reacted strongly and there was bitter fighting. The French surprised the enemy and quickly seized key terrain including Mounts Faito Cerasola and high ground near Castelforte. The 1st Motorized Division helped the 2nd Moroccan Infantry Division take key Mount Girofano and then advanced rapidly north to S. Apollinare and S. Ambrogio In spite of the stiffening enemy resistance, the 2nd Moroccan Division penetrated the Gustav Line in less than two days' fighting. The next 48 hours on the French front were decisive. The knife-wielding Goumiers swarmed over the hills, particularly at night, and General Juin's entire force showed an aggressiveness hour after hour that the Germans could not withstand. Cerasola, San Giogrio, Mt. D'Oro, Ausonia and Esperia were seized in one of the most brilliant and daring advances of the war in Italy, and by May 16 the French Expeditionary Corps had thrust forward some ten miles on their left flank to Mount Revole, with the remainder of their front slanting back somewhat to keep contact with the British 8th Army. For this performance, which was to be a key to the success of the entire drive on Rome, I shall always be a grateful admirer of General Juin and his magnificent FEC... The 8th Army's delay made Juin's task more difficult because he was moving forward so rapidly that his right flank---adjacent to the British---constantly was exposed to counter-attacks.

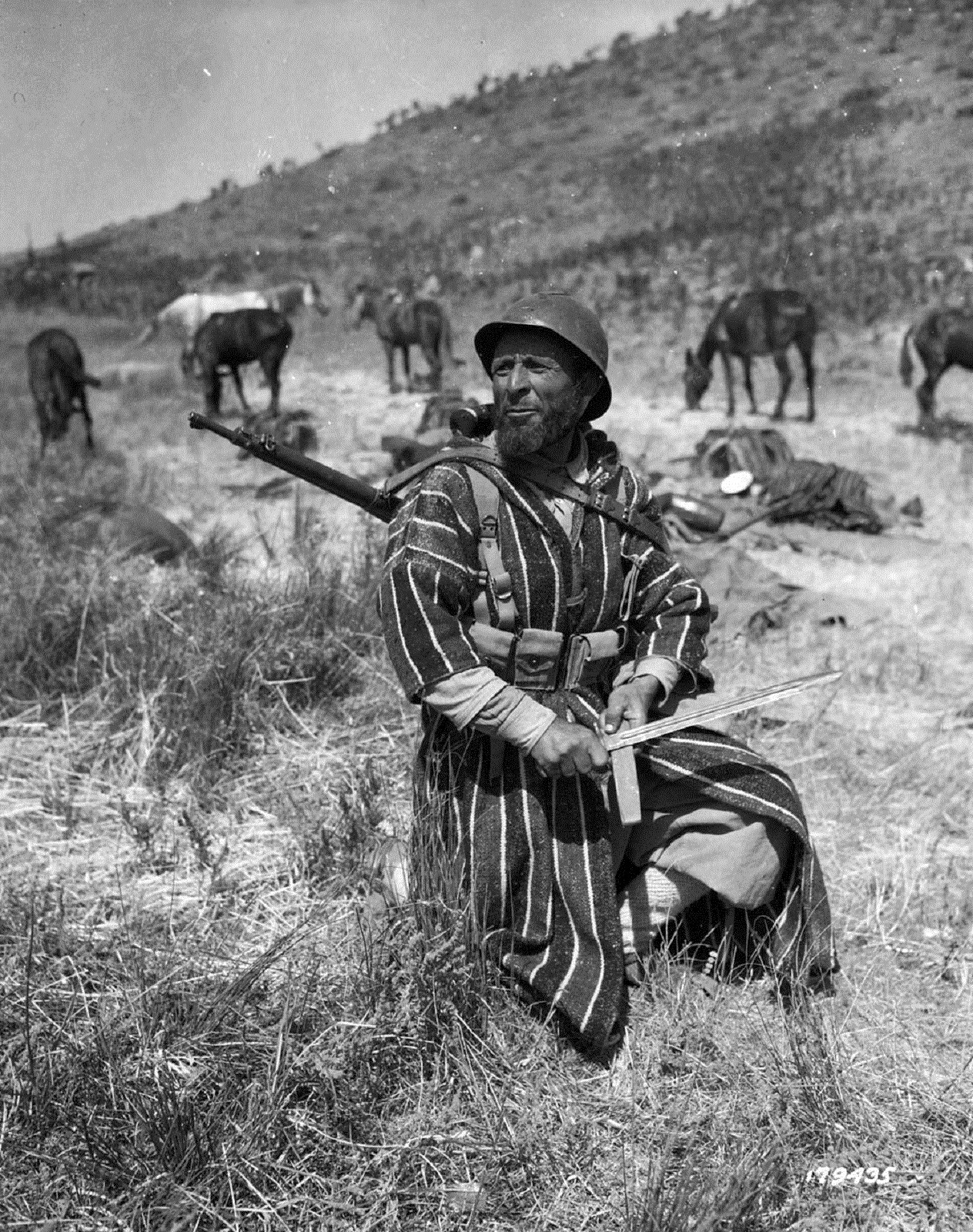
Moroccan Goumier sharpening his bayonet. Italy 1944.

In a letter to future Marshal Juin, General Mark Clark paid tribute to the Tirailleur units and Goumiers of the CEF in particular:

For me, it has been a deep source of satisfaction to see how the vital part played by the French troops of the Fifth Army throughout our Italian campaign against the common enemy has been universally acknowledged. During these long months, I have had the real privilege of seeing for myself the evidence of the outstanding calibre of the French soldiers, heirs of the noblest traditions of the French Army. Nevertheless, not satisfied with this, you and all your people have added a new epic chapter to the history of France; you have gladdened the hearts of your compatriots, giving them comfort and hope as they languish under the heavy and humiliating yoke of a hated invader. . . . With my deepest gratitude for the tremendous contribution that you have made to our joint victories, my dear General.

== See also ==
- Operation Diadem order of battle
- Battle of Monte Cassino: Operation Diadem
- Anzio: Operation Diadem
