= Hans-Günther von Rost =

German general

- Born: 15 November 1894; Hanover, Province of Hanover, German Empire
- Died: 23 March 1945 (aged 50); Székesfehérvár, Government of National Unity (Hungary)
- Military career
- Allegiance: Nazi Germany
- Branch: Wehrmacht
- Service years: 1914-1945
- Rank: Generalleutnant
- Commands: 3rd Infantry Division; 44th Infantry Division
- Conflicts: World War II: Operation Frühlingserwachen †
- Awards: Knight's Cross of the Iron Cross

Hans-Günther von Rost (15 November 1894 – 23 March 1945) was a German general during World War II. He was a recipient of the Knight's Cross of the Iron Cross. Rost was killed on 23 March 1945 near Székesfehérvár, Hungary.

== Awards and decorations ==
- Knight's Cross of the Iron Cross on 21 March 1945 as Generalleutnant and commander of 44. Reichsgrenadier-Division "Hoch- und Deutschmeister"

Military offices
Preceded by Generalmajor Hans Hecker	Commander of 3. Panzergrenadier-Division; 1 June 1944 – 25 June 1944	Succeeded by Generalleutnant Walter Denkert
Preceded by Generalleutnant Bruno Ortner	Commander of 44. Reichsgrenadier-Division "Hoch- und Deutschmeister"; 25 June 1944 – 23 March 1945	Succeeded by Oberst Hoffmann
