= Willibald Borowietz =

German general

- Born: 17 September 1893; Ratibor, German Empire
- Died: 1 July 1945 (aged 51); Camp Clinton, Clinton, Mississippi, United States
- Military career
- Allegiance: Nazi Germany
- Branch: Army (Wehrmacht)
- Rank: Generalleutnant
- Commands: 15th Panzer Division
- Conflicts: World War II
- Awards: Knight's Cross of the Iron Cross with Oak Leaves

Willibald Borowietz (17 September 1893 – 1 July 1945) was a German general during World War II who commanded several divisions. He was a recipient of the Knight's Cross of the Iron Cross with Oak Leaves of Nazi Germany.

Borowietz surrendered to Allied forces together with the Afrika Korps. He was held as a POW by the United States in Camp Clinton, Mississippi, where he died by suicide, electrocuting himself in a bathtub on 1 July 1945. Reports initially described his death as a cerebral hemorrhage while official Army records recorded it as an electrocution.

His wife, Eva Ledien, was of Jewish descent. She took her own life in October 1938 so that their children could be Aryanized. Eva's sister, Käthe (Ledien) Bosse, was killed in Ravensbrück concentration camp on 16 December 1944.

== Awards and decorations ==
- Iron Cross (1914) 2nd Class (6 October 1914) & 1st Class (25 June 1915)
- Clasp to the Iron Cross (1939) 2nd Class (25 September 1939) & 1st Class (11 June 1940)
- German Cross in Gold on 14 June 1942 as Oberst in Schützen-Regiment 10
- Knight's Cross of the Iron Cross with Oak Leaves
  - Knight's Cross on 24 July 1941 as Oberstleutnant and commander of Schützen-Regiment 10
  - Oak Leaves on 10 May 1943 as Generalmajor and commander of 15.Panzer-Division

Military offices
Preceded by Generalmajor Gustav von Vaerst	Commander of 15. Panzer-Division; 11 November 1942 – 13 May 1943	Succeeded by Unit Surrendered
