= Walter Fries =

German general (1894–1982)

- Born: 22 April 1894; Gusternhain (Breitscheid, Hesse)
- Died: 6 August 1982 (aged 88); Weilburg / Lahn
- Military career
- Allegiance: German Empire; Weimar Republic; Nazi Germany
- Branch: German Army
- Service years: 1912–1945
- Rank: General der Panzertruppe
- Commands: 29th Panzergrenadier Division; XXXXVI Army Corps
- Conflicts: World War I World War II
- Awards: Knight's Cross of the Iron Cross with Oak Leaves and Swords

Walter Fries (22 April 1894 – 6 August 1982) was a German general in the Wehrmacht of Nazi Germany during World War II. He was a recipient of the Knight's Cross of the Iron Cross with Oak Leaves and Swords.

== Awards ==
- Iron Cross (1914) 2nd and 1st Class
- Clasp to the Iron Cross (1939) 2nd Class (24 September 1939) & 1st Class (9 October 1939)
- Eastern Front Medal (18 July 1942)
- German Cross in Gold on 9 October 1942 as Oberst in Infanterie-Regiment 87 (mot.)
- Knight's Cross of the Iron Cross with Oak Leaves and Swords
  - Knight's Cross on 14 December 1941 as Oberst and commander of the Infanterie-Regiment 87 (mot.)
  - Oak Leaves on 29 January 1944 as Generalleutnant and commander of the 29. Panzergrenadier-Division
  - Swords on 11 August 1944 as Generalleutnant and commander of the 29. Panzergrenadier-Division

Military offices
Preceded by: 29. Infanterie-Division	Commander of 29 Panzergrenadier Division; 1 March 1943 – 5 March 1943	Succeeded by Generalleutnant Dr. rer. pol. Dr. jur. Hans Boelsen
Preceded by Generalleutnant Dr. rer. pol. Dr. jur. Hans Boelsen	Commander of 29 Panzergrenadier Division; 20 March 1943 – 24 August 1944	Succeeded by Generalleutnant Dr. Fritz Polack
Preceded by General der Artillerie Maximilian Felzmann	Commander of XXXXVI. Panzerkorps; 20 September 1944 – 19 January 1945	Succeeded by General der Infanterie Martin Gareis
