= 179th Reserve Panzer Division =

- Active: 1943–44
- Country: Nazi Germany
- Branch: Army
- Type: Panzer
- Role: Armoured warfare
- Size: Division

Commanders
- Notable commanders: Generalleutnant Walter von Boltenstern

The 179th Reserve Panzer Division (German: 179. Reserve-Panzer-Division) of the German army in World War II was formed in July 1943. The division was stationed in France from July 1943 to May 1944 when it was disbanded and absorbed by the 116th Panzer Division.

== Commanders ==
- Generalmajor Herbert Stimmel
- Generalleutnant Max von Hartlieb-Walsporn (1940-06-20 - 1940-05-22)
- Generalleutnant Walter von Boltenstern (1943-07-30 - 1944-05-10)

== Order of battle ==
- Reserve-Panzer-Abteilung 1 (Reserve Armoured Unit 1)
- Reserve-Panzergrenadier-Regiment 81 (Reserve Armoured Infantry Regiment 81)
- Reserve-Grenadier-Regiment (mot.) 29 (Reserve Grenadier Regiment (mechanised) 29)
- Reserve-Artillerie-Abteilung 29 (Reserve Artillery Unit 29)
- Reserve-Panzeraufklärungs-Abteilung 1 (Reserve Armoured Reconnaissance Unit 1)
- Reserve-Panzerjäger-Abteilung 9 (Reserve Tank Destroyer Unit 9)
- Reserve-Panzerversorgungstruppen (Reserve armoured supply units)
