= Smilo Freiherr von Lüttwitz =

German general (1895–1975)

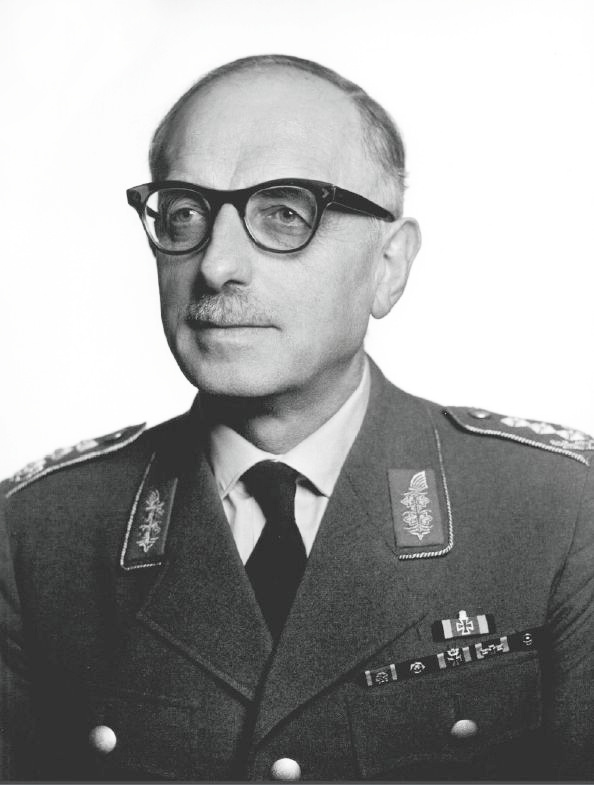
- Lüttwitz, c. 1960
- Born: 23 December 1895; Straßburg, German Empire
- Died: 19 May 1975 (aged 79); Koblenz, West Germany
- Burial place: Cemetery Rüngsdorf. Section 3
- Relatives: Walther von Lüttwitz (father)
- Military career
- Allegiance: German Empire; Weimar Republic; Nazi Germany; West Germany
- Branch: German Army; Bundeswehr)
- Service years: 1914–1945; 1957–1960
- Rank: General der Panzertruppe; Generalleutnant
- Conflicts: World War I World War II
- Awards: Knight's Cross of the Iron Cross with Oak Leaves and Swords; Order of Merit of the Federal Republic of Germany

Smilo Walther Hinko Oskar Constantin Wilhelm Freiherr von Lüttwitz (23 December 1895 – 19 May 1975) was a German general during World War II and son of Walther von Lüttwitz. After World War II he joined the Bundeswehr in 1957 and served as the first commander of the III Corps until his retirement in 1960.

== Biography ==
Lüttwitz was born on 23 December 1895 in Straßburg (now Strasbourg) into a family with a long history of military service. He joined the military service during the mobilisation on 3 August 1914 as an officer cadet in the 25th Division in Darmstadt. Lüttwitz was posted to the Eastern Front and saw combat at Tannenberg, Courland and Düna. He was severely wounded twice in 1915 and received the Iron Cross 1st class. He was commissioned as an officer in 1915.

In 1916 Lüttwitz was transferred to a staff position with the X Corps in the Heeresgruppe Kronprinz for two years. The corps was under the command of his father General Walther von Lüttwitz. His father, a recipient of the Pour le Mérite, was one of the most highly decorated generals of the German Empire. He returned to front line duty in 1918 as an adjutant with the Darmstädter Dragoner in the temporary occupation of Ukraine and southern Russia. By the end of World War I, he had received both classes of the Iron Cross and the Wound Badge in Silver. He remained in the Weimar Republic's Army, serving in various cavalry units. After the beginning of the Nazi leadership, he joined the Panzer (armor) branch.

In 1939 he was promoted to lieutenant colonel and served as adjutant in the XV Army Corps. He was later commanding an infantry regiment and the 4th Rifle Brigade. He served on the Eastern Front. Later, he commanded the 26th Panzer Division in Italy, the LXXXV Army Corps and the 9th Army. During this time, he learned of the government issued orders for summary justice. He opposed it and faced a trial, but was allowed to retain command of his unit.

He was released from internment in 1947. He then went to the Evangelical Academy in Friedewald. During the period of 1954 to 1957, he was the head business manager for the relief organization Order of St. John in Rolandseck. Later, he returned to the Evangelical Academy as Head of Administration.

In 1957, he joined the new West German army (Bundeswehr) as a lieutenant general. He was appointed commanding general of the III Corps in Koblenz. He retired in 1960. In 1963, he became chairman of the board for a defense industry. In 1955, Lüttwitz was made a knight in the Order of St. John. In 1963, he took over as president of that organization. At the end of his military service, Lüttwitz received the American Legion of Merit in recognition of his service.

== Awards ==
- Iron Cross (1914) 2nd and 1st class
- General Honor Decoration (Hesse)
- Honour Cross of the World War 1914/1918
- Wehrmacht Long Service Award 1st to 4th Class
- Clasp to the Iron Cross (1939) 2nd Class (6 October 1939) & 1st Class (27 May 1940)
- German Cross in Gold on 27 October 1941 as Oberstleutnant and commander of the Schützen-Regiment 12
- Knight's Cross of the Iron Cross with Oak Leaves and Swords
  - Knight's Cross on 14 January 1942 as Oberst and commander of the Schützen-Regiment 12
  - 426th Oak Leaves on 16 March 1944 as Generalleutnant and commander of the 26. Panzer-Division
  - 76th Swords on 4 July 1944 as Generalleutnant and commander of the 26. Panzer-Division
- Rechtsritter (Knight of Justice) of the Order of Saint John (Bailiwick of Brandenburg)
- Eastern Front Medal
- Great Cross of Merit with star
- Legion of Merit

Military offices
Preceded by none	Commander of 26. Panzer-Division (Wehrmacht); 14 September 1942 – 22 January 1944	Succeeded by Generalmajor Hans Hecker
Preceded by Generalmajor Hans Hecker	Commander of 26. Panzer-Division (Wehrmacht); 20 February 1944 – 11 April 1944	Succeeded by Oberst Dr. rer. pol. Dr. jur. Hans Boelsen
Preceded by Generalleutnant Fritz Becker	Commander of XXXXVI Panzer Corps; 24 July 1944 - 28 August 1944	Succeeded by General of the Artillery Maximilian Felzmann
Preceded by General Nikolaus von Vormann	Commander of 9. Armee (Wehrmacht); 1 September 1944 – 19 January 1945	Succeeded by General Theodor Busse
Preceded by —	Commander of III. Corps (Bundeswehr); 1 June 1957 – 31 December 1960	Succeeded by Generalleutnant Heinrich Gaedcke
