= Operation Nordwind order of battle =

Operation Nordwind was launched by German ground forces on 31 December 1944 against U.S. and French ground forces in the Rhineland-Palatinate and the Alsace and Lorraine regions of southwestern Germany and northeastern France as part of the European Theatre in World War II. It ended on 25 January 1945.

== North of Strasbourg ==
Allied Forces

Sixth Army Group
Lieutenant General Jacob L. Devers

Forces deployed North to South:

US Seventh Army
Lieutenant General Alexander McC. Patch (Note: Died of pneumonia approx. 5-1/2 months after the end of the war in Europe.)

XV Corps
Major General Wade H. Haislip

103rd Infantry Division (Maj. Gen. Charles Haffner)
44th Infantry Division (Brig. Gen. William F. Dean)
100th Infantry Division (Maj. Gen. Withers A. Burress)
63rd Infantry Division (Brig. Gen. Frederick Harris)

VI Corps
Major General Edward H. Brooks

45th Infantry Division (Maj. Gen. Robert Frederick)
70th Infantry Division (Brig. Gen. Thomas W. Herren)
42nd Infantry Division (Maj. Gen. Harry J. Collins)
79th Infantry Division (Maj. Gen. Ira Wyche)

French 2nd Armored Division (Gen. Div. Philippe Leclerc de Hauteclocque) (Note: Leclerc, the 2nd Armored's commander, refused to serve under de Lattre owing to the latter's having served under Pétain, whom Leclerc considered to be a collaborationist. [Beevor, p. 326])

Axis Forces

Army Group G
Generaloberst Johannes Blaskowitz

First Army
Generalleutnant Hans von Obstfelder

25th Panzergrenadier Division (Oberst Arnold Burmeister)
21st Panzer Division (Generalleutnant Edgar Feuchtinger)
6th SS Mountain Division Nord (SS-Gruppenführer Karl-Heinrich Brenner)

XIII SS Corps
SS-Obergruppenführer Max Simon (Note: Served approx. 8 years for war crimes)

19th Volksgrenadier Division (Generalleutnant Walter Wißmath)
36th Volksgrenadier Division (Generalmajor Helmut Kleikamp)
17th SS Panzergrenadier Division Götz von Berlichingen (SS-Standartenführer Hans Lingner)

XC Corps
General der Flieger Erich Petersen

559th Volksgrenadier Division (Generalleutnant Kurt Freiherr von Mühlen)
257th Volksgrenadier Division (Generalmajor Erich Seidel)

LXXXIX Corps
General der Infanterie Gustav Höhne

361st Volksgrenadier Division (Generalmajor Alfred Philippi)
245th Infantry Division (Generalleutnant Edwin Sander)
256th Volksgrenadier Division (Generalmajor Gerhard Franz)

== South of Strasbourg (Colmar Pocket) ==
Allied Forces

Sixth Army Group (cont.)
Lieutenant General Jacob L. Devers

Forces deployed North to South:

French First Army
Lieutenant General Jean de Lattre de Tassigny (Note: Later successfully led French forces against the Việt Minh in the First Indochina War.)

II Corps
Géneral Joseph de Goislard de Monsabert

1st Armored Division (Gén. Aimé Sudré)
9th Colonial Infantry Division (Gén. Joseph Magnan)
2nd Moroccan Infantry Division (Gén. Marcel Carpentier)
4th Moroccan Mountain Division (Gén. Réne de Hesdin)
5th Armored Division (Gén. Henri de Vernejoul)
10th Infantry Division (Gén. Pierre Billotte)

US XXI Corps
Major General Frank W. Milburn

12th Armored Division (Maj. Gen. Roderick R. Allen)
14th Armored Division (Maj. Gen. Albert Smith)
36th Infantry Division (Maj. Gen. John Dahlquist)

I Corps
Géneral Antoine Béthouart

1st Infantry March Division (Gén. Diego Brosset)
3rd Algerian Infantry Division (Gén. Augustin Guillaume)

Axis Forces

Army Group Upper Rhine
Reichsführer-SS Heinrich Himmler

Nineteenth Army
General der Infanterie Siegfried Rasp

10th SS Panzer Division Frundsberg (SS-Brigadeführer Heinz Harmel)
LXIV Corps
General der Infanterie Helmut Thumm

189th Infantry Division (Generalmajor Eduard Zorn) (Note: Killed in action 4 February.)
198th Infantry Division (Generalmajor Otto Schiel)
708th Volksgrenadier Division (Generalmajor Wilhelm Bleckwenn)
16th Infantry Division

LXIII Corps
General der Infanterie Erich Abraham

338th Infantry Division (Generalmajor Konrad Barde) (Note: Committed suicide 4 May.)
159th Infantry Division (Generalmajor Heinrich Bürky)
716th Infantry Division (Generalmajor Wolf Ewert)
269th Infantry Division (Generalleutnant Hans Wagner)

XIV SS Corps
SS-Obergruppenführer Erich von dem Bach-Zelewski (Note: Brutally suppressed the Warsaw uprising; died in prison 1972.)

553rd Volksgrenadier-Division (Generalmajor Gerhard Hüther)
10th SS Panzer Division Frundsberg (from 15 January) (SS-Brigadeführer Heinz Harmel)

== Sources ==
Beevor, Antony (2015). Ardennes 1944: The Battle of the Bulge. New York: Penguin. ISBN 978-0-1431098-6-0.
Cirillo, Roger. The Ardennes-Alsace. The U.S. Army Campaigns of World War II. United States Army Center of Military History. CMH Pub 72-26. Archived from the original on 2008-12-06.
Clarke, Jeffrey J.; Ross Smith, Robert (1993). Riviera to the Rhine. Washington, DC: U.S. Army Center of Military History. Archived from the original on November 8, 2010.
Engler, Richard (1999). The Final Crisis: Combat in Northern Alsace, January 1945. Aberjona Press. ISBN 978-0-9666389-1-2.
Zaloga, Steven (2010). Operation Nordwind 1945. Oxford: Osprey. ISBN 978-1-84603-683-5.
"US 44th Infantry Division - Nordwind". [ Battle History of the United States 44th Infantry Division, ETO 1944 - 1945]. Archived from the original on 2005-03-06.
14th Armored Division Combat History
The NORDWIND Offensive (January 1945) on the website of the 100th Infantry Division Association contains a list of German primary sources on the operation.
