= General Buck =

General Buck may refer to:

- Albert Buck (1895–1942), German Wehrmacht major general
- Beaumont B. Buck (1860–1950), U.S. Army major general
- David J. Buck (fl. 1980s–2010s), U.S. Air Force lieutenant general
