= General Ott =

General Ott may refer to:

- Charles A. Ott Jr. (1920–2006), U.S. Army major general
- Eugen Ott (ambassador) (1889–1977), German Army generalmajor
- Eugen Ott (general) (1890–1966), German Wehrmacht general

== See also ==
- Friedrich-Wilhelm Otte (1898–1944), German Wehrmacht general
