= Friedrich-Carl Rabe von Pappenheim =

- Born: 5 October 1894; Münster, German Empire
- Died: 9 June 1977 (aged 82); Hamm, West Germany
- Military career
- Allegiance: Nazi Germany
- Branch: Army
- Service years: 1914–1945
- Rank: Generalleutnant
- Commands: 97th Jäger Division
- Conflicts: World War I World War II: Battle of France; Invasion of Yugoslavia; Operation Barbarossa; Battle of Kiev (1941); Crimean Campaign (1941–1942); Lvov–Sandomierz Offensive; Battle of the Dukla Pass; Upper Silesian Offensive
- Awards: Knight's Cross of the Iron Cross

Friedrich-Carl Rabe von Pappenheim (5 October 1894 – 9 June 1977) was a general in the Wehrmacht of Nazi Germany during World War II and later an intelligence officer in the Federal Republic of Germany.

== Life ==
Friedrich-Carl was descended from an old Westphalian noble family. He was a son of the Prussian Major General Walter Rabe von Pappenheim (1862–1941) and his wife Charlotte, née von Witzendorff (1868–1935).

After passing his high school diploma, Rabe von Pappenheim joined the reserve squadron of the "von Driesen" (Westphalian) No. 4 cuirassier regiment at the beginning of the First World War on August 2, 1914 as a flag cadet. In October 1914 he fought on the Western Front, took part in the battles of the Somme, Arras and Lille and was promoted to non-commissioned officer on October 20. From November 1914 he was on the Eastern Front and received his promotion to ensign on December 24. For his services, Rabe von Pappenheim received the Iron Cross, Second Class in January 1915 and was appointed lieutenant on April 26, 1915. In November 1916 he took part in a machine gun officer course in Döberitz and in May 1917 he was assigned to the staff of the 9th Cavalry Division as a machine gun officer. On April 19, 1917 he received the Iron Cross, First Class. At the beginning of 1918, Rabe von Pappenheim came to the MG Sniper Command West and became company commander of the Machine Gun Sniper Division 44 on March 15, 1918. From June 1918 until the end of the war he was an orderly officer on the staff of the 14th Reserve Division and at the General Command of the VII Army Corps.

After the end of the First World War, Rabe von Pappenheim was taken over into the Reichswehr. On March 10, 1920 he married Hildegard, née Freiin von der Recke-Uentrop. Their son Günter was born in December of the same year. In September 1923 he was promoted to first lieutenant and in October took part in a course for assistant commanders . After his promotion to captain in 1928, Rabe von Pappenheim became chief of the 6th squadron in the 15th (Prussian) Cavalry Regiment. His second son Burkhard was born in August 1931.

As a captain, he was transferred to the Reichswehr Ministry in Berlin on November 1, 1933 as First General Staff Officer (Ia) of the attaché group in the Army Department, which was later attached to the Foreign Armies Department. Promoted to major in 1935, he took over leadership of the group in the same year. Two years later, on October 1, 1937, he moved to the German legations in The Hague and Brussels as a military attaché with the rank of lieutenant colonel, and in January 1940 he was entrusted with the consequences of the Mechelen Incident. Here he experienced the peculiarities that took place there from September 1939 with the German attack on Poland.

After German troops invaded Belgian and Dutch territory, he was expelled from the country. In the same year he received his appointment as colonel. In October he received his first front command as commander of the 463rd Infantry Regiment in the 263rd Infantry Division (Wehrmacht). From October 1941 to 1943 he was a military attaché at the German legation in Budapest. On October 8, 1943, Rabe von Pappenheim was transferred to the commander reserve at the Army High Command as a major general (since August 8, 1943) and took a division commander course in Döberitz in November. Appointed in December 1943, he took up command of the 97th Jaeger Division in February 1944 and received his commission as lieutenant general on July 1, 1944. Rabe von Pappenheim received the German Cross in Gold on November 8, 1944 and the Knight's Cross of the Iron Cross on April 30, 1945, but at that time he was no longer commander of the 97th Jäger Division, which was in Bohemia. On May 8, 1945 he was taken prisoner by the Americans and was transferred to Soviet captivity on June 1, 1945. The extradition took place after agreements between the American and Soviet high command, according to which all troops that were ultimately under the high command of Army Group Schörner became Soviet prisoners of war. At the “Homecoming of the Ten Thousand” in October 1955, Rabe von Pappenheim was also released by the Soviets.

From 1956 to 1967 he worked in the civil service and was retired on October 1, 1967. Friedrich-Carl Rabe von Pappenheim died on June 9, 1977 in Uentrop near Hamm at the age of 82. His wife Hildegard died in 1973.

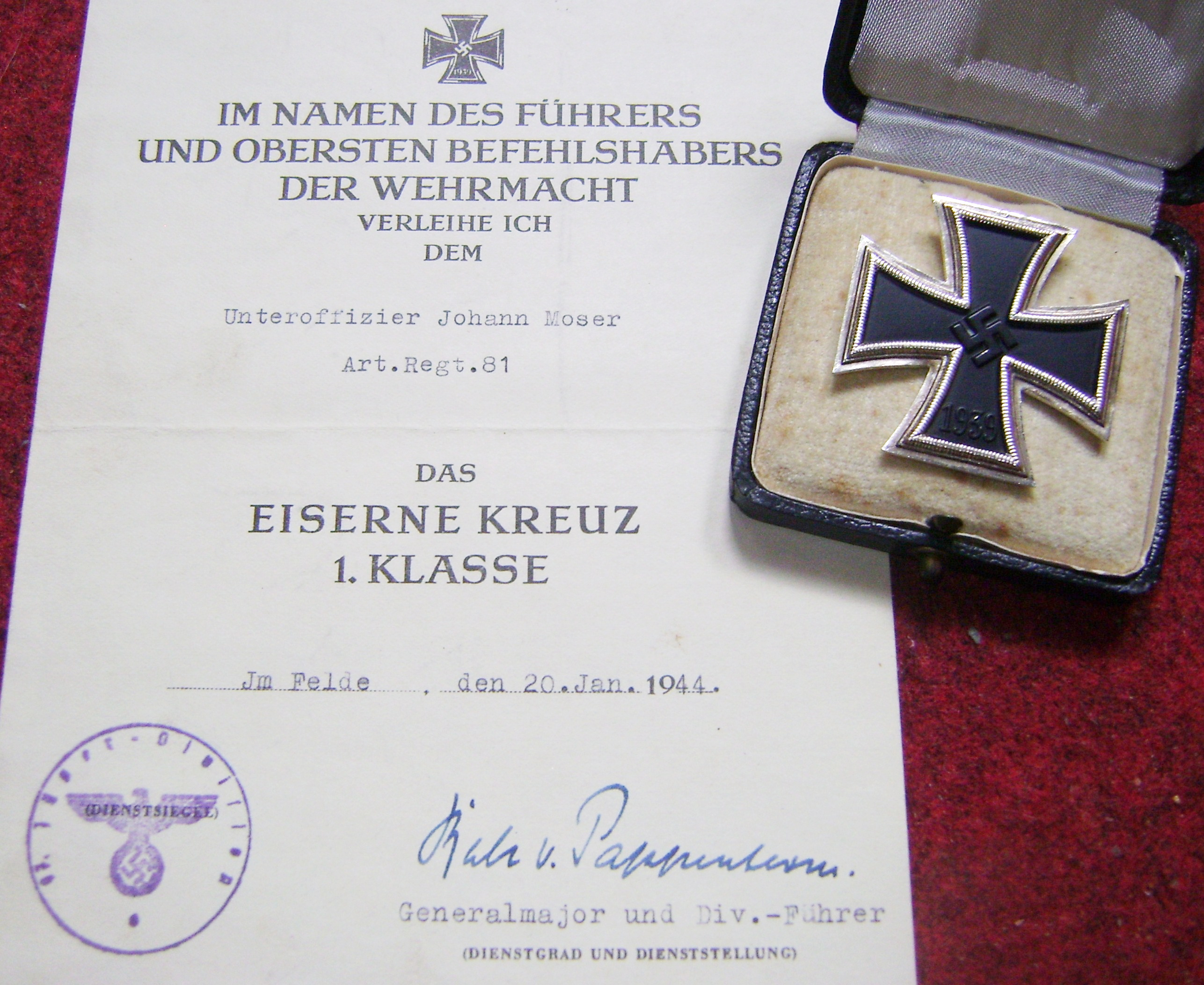
Iron Cross First Class issued to a soldier of Artillery Regiment 81 of 97th Jäger Division, with a certificate signed by Pappenheim.

Von Pappenheim held the command of 97th Jäger Division between 13 December 1943 and February 1945.

== Awards ==
- Iron Cross (1914)
  - 2nd Class (12 January 1915)
  - 1st Class (19 April 1917)
- Honour Cross of the World War 1914/1918
- Knight First Class of the Order of the White Rose of Finland (6 September 1937)
- Estonian Order of the Eagle Cross 3rd Class (30 October 1937)
- Officer's Cross of the Order of the Crown of Italy (26 November 1937)
- Yugoslavian Order of the White Eagle (20 January 1938)
- Royal Dutch Order of Orange-Nassau with swords (19 February 1938)
- Iron Cross (1939)
  - 2nd Class (17 June 1940)
  - 1st Class (10 April 1941)
- German Cross in Gold (8 November 1944)
- Knight's Cross of the Iron Cross on 30 April 1945 as Generalleutnant and commander of 97. Jäger-Division

== See also ==
- Mechelen Incident
- May 1941 Sanski Most revolt

Military offices
Preceded by General der Infanterie Ludwig Müller	Commander of 97th Jäger Division; 13 December 1943 – 17 April 1945	Succeeded by Generalmajor Robert Bader
