= Ludwig Müller (general) =

Nazi general (1892–1972)

Johann Ludwig Müller
- Born: 28 June 1892; Zeselberg
- Died: 28 June 1972 (aged 80); Ettlingen
- Military career
- Allegiance: German Empire; Weimar Republic; Nazi Germany
- Branch: German Army
- Service years: 1914–1945
- Rank: General der Infanterie
- Commands: 198th Infantry Division; 97th Jäger Division; XXXXIV Army Corps
- Conflicts: World War I; World War II; Battle of France; Operation Barbarossa; Battle of Kiev (1941); Battles of Rzhev; Battle of the Caucasus; Lower Dnieper Offensive; Jassy–Kishinev Offensive (August 1944)
- Awards: Knight's Cross of the Iron Cross with Oak Leaves

Johann Ludwig Müller (28 June 1892 – 28 June 1972) was a German general (General of the Infantry) in the Wehrmacht during World War II, and a recipient of the Knight's Cross of the Iron Cross with Oak Leaves of Nazi Germany.

Müller, as commander of the XXXXIV Army Corps, surrendered to the Soviet forces in August 1944 and was held in the Soviet Union as a war criminal until 1955.

== Awards and decorations ==
- Iron Cross (1914) 2nd Class (10 July 1915) & 1st Class (8 April 1918)
- Clasp to the Iron Cross (1939) 2nd Class (21 October 1939) & 1st Class (31 May 1940)
- German Cross in Gold on 28 February 1942 as Oberst im Generalstab in the General Staff of the XXIII. Armeekorps
- Knight's Cross of the Iron Cross with Oak Leaves
  - Knight's Cross on 25 October 1943 as Generalleutnant and commander of 97. Jäger Division
  - 440th Oak Leaves on 6 April 1944 as Generalleutnant and deputy leader of XXIX Armeekorps

Military offices
Preceded by Generalmajor Albert Buck	Commander of 198. Infanterie-Division; 27 August 1942 – 5 February 1943	Succeeded by Generalleutnant Hans-Joachim von Horn
Preceded by Generalmajor Friedrich-Wilhelm Otte	Commander of 97. Jäger Division; 3 June 1943 – 12 December 1943	Succeeded by Generalleutnant Friedrich-Carl Rabe von Pappenheim
Preceded by General der Artillerie Maximilian de Angelis	Commander of XXXXIV Army Corps; 8 April 1944 – August 1944	Succeeded by none (Corps destroyed)
