= Mechelen incident =

Event during the Phoney War in the first stages of World War II

Coordinates: 50.9729°N 5.7158°E

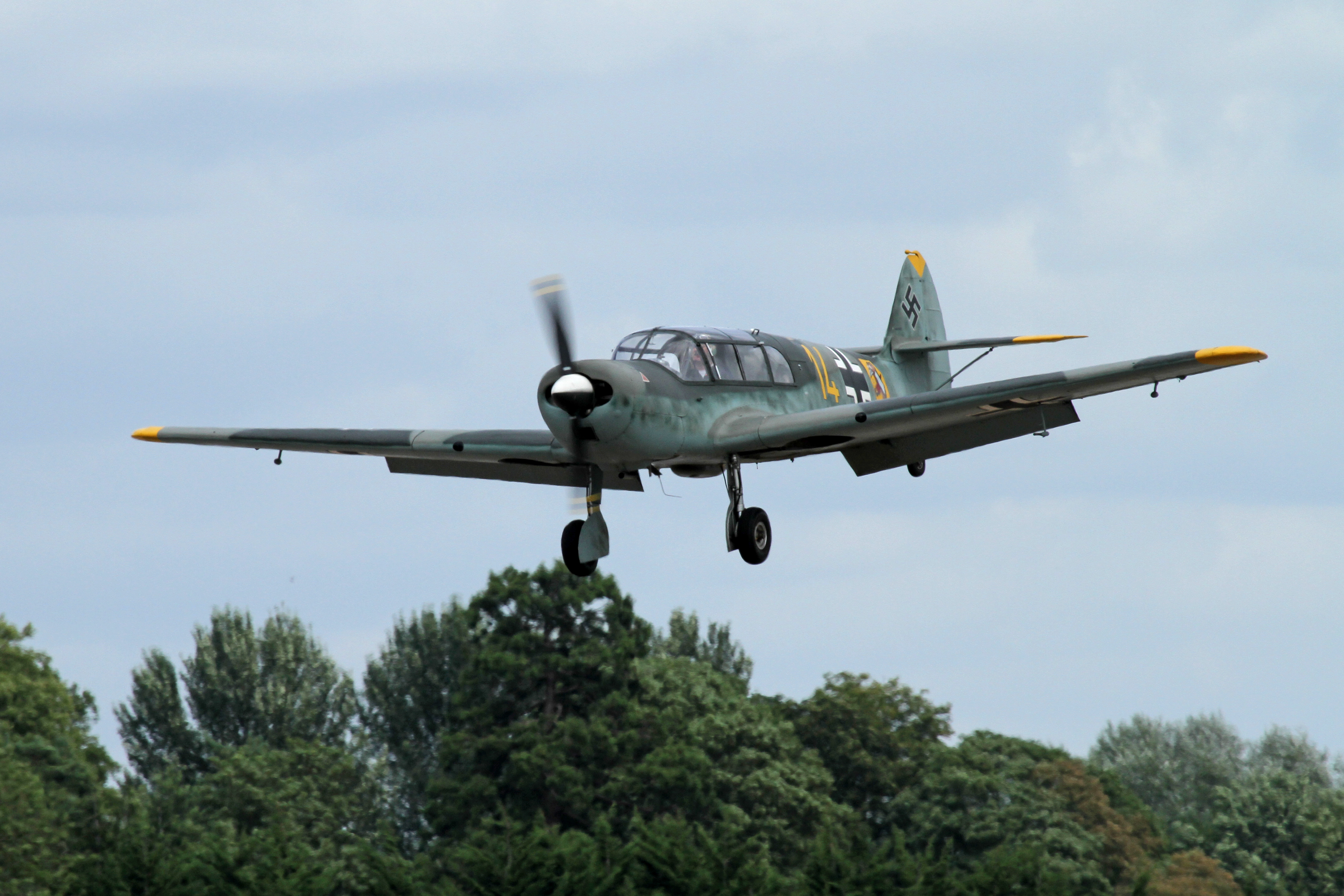
A Messerschmitt Bf.108, the type of aircraft that Erich Hoenmanns flew.

The Mechelen incident of 10 January 1940, also known as the Mechelen affair, took place in Belgium during the Phoney War in the first stages of World War II. A German aircraft with an officer on board carrying the plans for Fall Gelb (Case Yellow), the German attack on the Low Countries, crash-landed in neutral Belgium near Vucht in the modern-day municipality of Maasmechelen (Mechelen-aan-de-Maas) within the Province of Limburg. This prompted an immediate crisis in the Low Countries and amidst the French and British authorities, whom the Belgians notified of their discovery; however, the crisis abated relatively quickly once the dates mentioned in the plans passed without incident. It has been argued that the incident led to a major change in the German attack plan, but this hypothesis has also been disputed.

== The crash ==
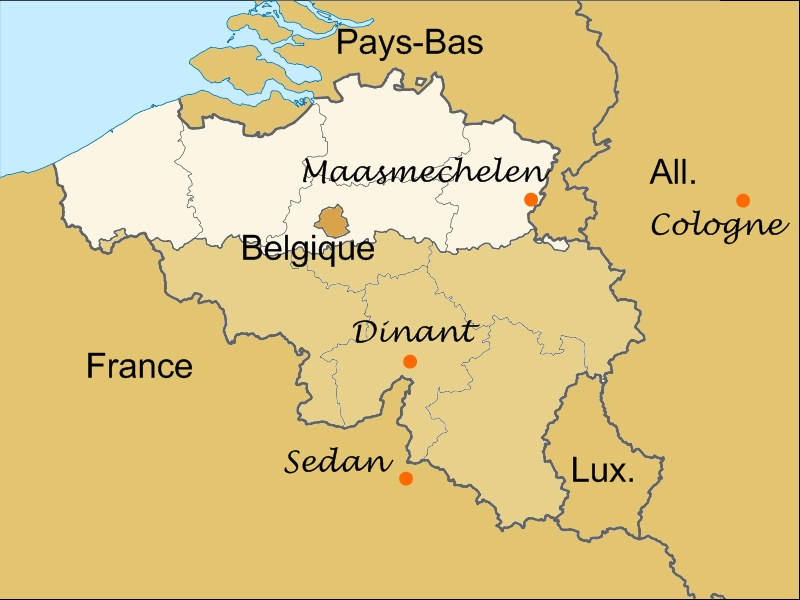
The location of the crash site

The incident was caused by an error by the German aviator Major Erich Hoenmanns, the fifty-two-year-old base commander of Loddenheide airfield, near Münster. On the morning of 10 January 1940, he had been flying a Messerschmitt Bf 108 Taifun, an aircraft used for reconnaissance, liaison, and other miscellaneous roles, from Loddenheide to Cologne when he lost his way; extensive low fogbanks obscured his view of the landscape. In response he changed course to the west, hoping to regain his bearings by reaching the River Rhine. However, having already crossed over the frozen and indistinguishable Rhine at the moment he changed direction, he left German territory flying all the way to the River Meuse, the border in this area between Belgium and the Netherlands, and ended up circling Vucht.

At that moment, Hoenmanns seems by mistake to have cut off the fuel supply to the plane's engine by moving a lever inside the cockpit. The engine spluttered, then stopped, and Hoenmanns was forced to land in a nearby field at about 11:30 AM. The aircraft was severely damaged. Both wings were broken off when they hit two Canadian poplar trees as he sped between them; the heavy engine tore off the nose section. The plane was damaged beyond repair, but Hoenmanns survived unscathed.

Had Hoenmanns been alone in the plane, nothing of great significance would likely have happened, apart from his internment for landing without permission in a neutral country. However, he had a passenger, Major Helmuth Reinberger, who was responsible for organising the German 7th Air Division's supply, the formation that was to land paratroopers behind the Belgian lines at Namur on the day of the coming attack. Reinberger was going to Cologne for a staff meeting. The previous evening, over a drink in the mess, Hoenmanns had offered to fly him there. Usually, Reinberger would have had to make the tedious trip by train, but Hoenmanns needed some extra flying hours anyway and wanted to take his laundry to his wife in Cologne. Hoenmanns was unaware that Reinberger would be carrying documents related to the German plan for the attack on the Netherlands and Belgium, which on the day of the flight was decreed by Hitler to take place a week later on 17 January.

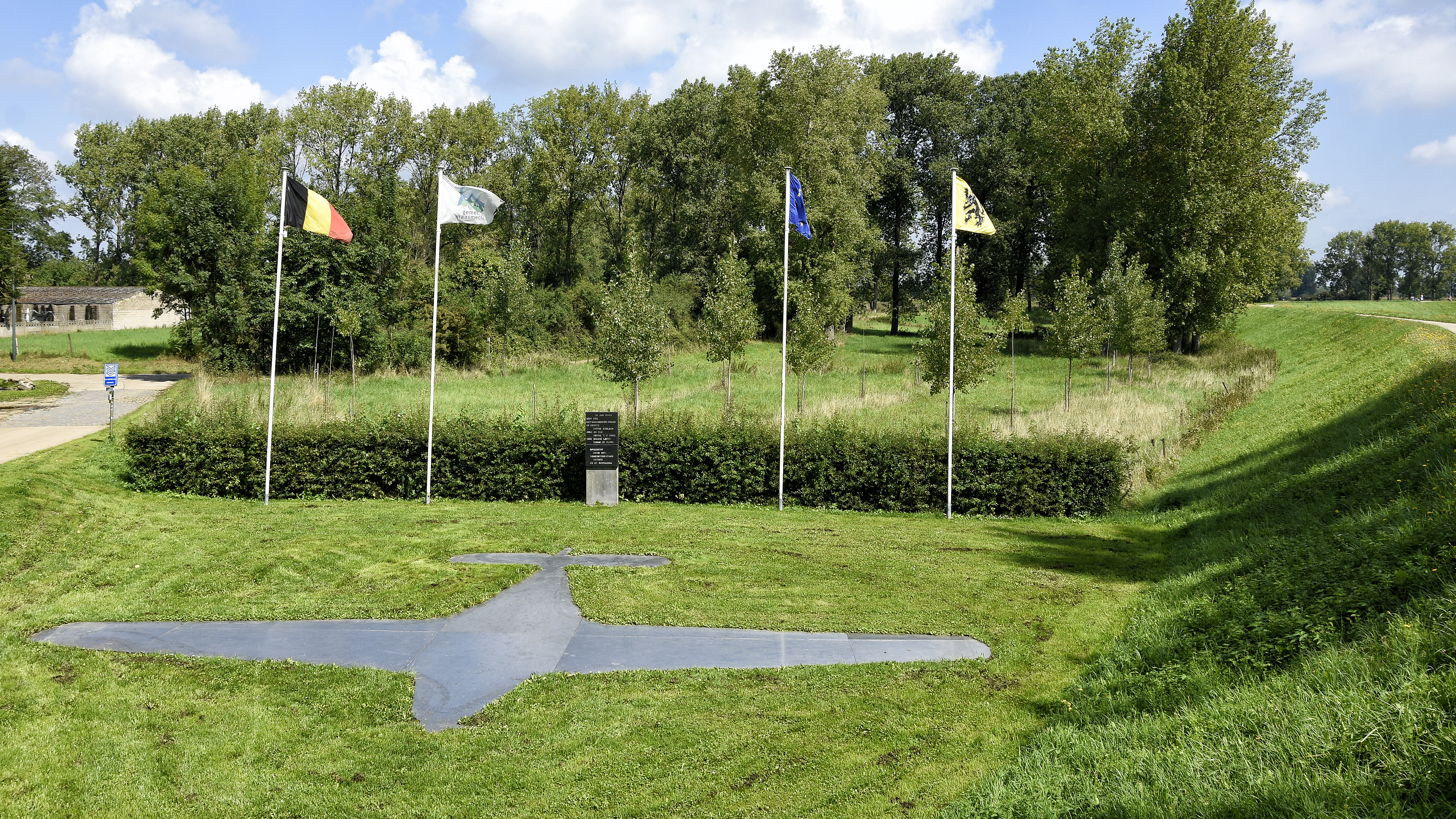
Today, a monument commemorates the crash

Only after landing did Hoenmanns become aware that Reinberger was carrying secret documents when they asked a farmhand, Engelbert Lambrichts, where they were, to be told that they had unknowingly crossed Dutch territory and landed just inside Belgium. On hearing this, Reinberger panicked and rushed back to the plane to secure his yellow pigskin briefcase, crying that he had secret documents that he must destroy immediately. To let him do this Hoenmanns, as a diversion, moved away from the plane. Reinberger first tried to set fire to the documents with his cigarette lighter but it malfunctioned; he then ran to the farmhand who gave him a single match. With this Reinberger hid behind a thicket and piled the papers on the ground to burn them. But soon two Belgian border guards, Sergeant Frans Habets and Corporal Gerard Rubens, arrived on bicycles. Seeing smoke coming from the bushes, Rubens rushed over to save the documents from being completely destroyed. Reinberger fled at first but allowed himself to be taken prisoner after two warning shots had been fired.

The two Germans were taken to the Belgian border guardhouse near Mechelen-aan-de-Maas (French: Malines-sur-Meuse). There they were interrogated by Captain Arthur Rodrique, who placed the charred documents on a table. As a diversion once more, Hoenmanns asked the Belgian soldiers to let him use the toilet; Reinberger then tried to stuff the papers into a burning stove nearby. He succeeded but yelled with pain when lifting the extremely hot lid of the stove. Startled, Rodrique turned and snatched the papers from the fire, badly burning his hand in the process. The documents were then locked away in a separate room. The failure to burn them made Reinberger realise that he would surely be shot, for letting the attack plan fall into the hands of the enemy. He decided to commit suicide and tried to grab Rodrique's revolver. When the infuriated captain knocked him down, Reinberger burst into tears, shouting 'I wanted your revolver to kill myself'. Hoenmanns supported Reinberger saying: 'You can't blame him. He's a regular officer. He's finished now.

Two hours later officers from the Belgian intelligence service arrived, and brought the papers to the attention of their superiors in the late afternoon.

== Initial German reaction ==
Late in the evening of 10 January news of the incident reached Berlin via press reports about a crashed German plane. In the Oberkommando der Wehrmacht, the German armed forces high command, it caused general consternation, as it was soon deduced that Reinberger must have had papers revealing parts of the attack plan with him. On 11 January an enraged Hitler fired both the commander of Luftflotte 2, General Hellmuth Felmy, and Felmy's chief of staff Colonel Josef Kammhuber. It was nevertheless decided to proceed with the attack as originally planned, while the Luftwaffe attaché in The Hague, Lieutenant-General Ralph Wenninger, and the military attaché in Brussels, Colonel Friedrich-Carl Rabe von Pappenheim, would investigate whether the plan had been fatally compromised or not. On 12 January, the day of the attachés' first meeting with Reinberger and Hoenmanns, General Alfred Jodl, the Wehrmacht's Chief of Operations, gave Hitler a worrying assessment of what the Belgians might have learned from it. A note in Jodl's diary on 12 January summed up what he had said to Hitler: 'If the enemy is in possession of all the files, situation catastrophic!' However, the Germans were initially falsely reassured by Belgian deception measures.

== Deception ==
The Belgians decided to try tricking Reinberger into believing that the papers had been destroyed and give him the opportunity to pass this information on to the German authorities. There were two parts to the deception: in the first the Belgian investigators asked Reinberger what was in the plans and told him that he would be treated as a spy if he did not tell them. Later Reinberger testified saying: "From the way this question was asked, I realised he [the interrogator] could not have understood anything from the fragments of the documents he had seen." The second part of the plan was to let Reinberger and Hoenmanns meet the German Air and Army Attachés, Wenninger and Rabe von Pappenheim, while their conversations were secretly recorded. During this meeting Reinberger informed Wenninger that he had managed to burn the papers enough to make them unreadable. This act of deception was fairly successful, at least in the short term. After the meeting at the police station, Vicco von Bülow-Schwante, Germany's ambassador to Belgium, telegraphed his superiors: 'Major Reinberger has confirmed that he burnt the documents except for some pieces which are the size of the palm of his hand. Reinberger confirms that most of the documents which could not be destroyed appear to be unimportant.' This appears to have convinced General Jodl. His diary for 13 January included the entry: "Report on conversation of Luftwaffe Attaché with the two airmen who made forced landing. Result: despatch case burnt for certain."

== Belgian reaction ==
During 10 January the Belgians still doubted the authenticity of the documents, which had been quickly translated by the Deuxième Section (military intelligence) of the general staff in Brussels. Most had indeed been badly damaged by Reinberger's consecutive attempts to burn them, but the general outlines of an attack against Belgium and the Netherlands were clear from the remaining passages, although the date of the attack was not mentioned and most of the text was concerned with specific instructions to 7. Flieger-Division only. As their content conformed to earlier warnings from the Italian Foreign Minister, Count Galeazzo Ciano, about a German attack to take place around 15 January, on 11 January General Raoul Van Overstraeten concluded that the information was basically correct. That afternoon King Leopold III of Belgium decided to inform his own Minister of Defence, General Henri Denis, and the French supreme commander, Maurice Gamelin. At 17:15 the French liaison officer, Lieutenant-Colonel Hautcœur, was given a two-page abstract of the contents, albeit without any explanation of how the information had been obtained. Lord Gort, the commander of the British Expeditionary Force, was also warned, and Leopold personally telephoned Princess Juliana of the Netherlands and Grand Duchess Charlotte of Luxembourg, telling the former "Be careful, the weather is dangerous", and the latter "Beware of the flu", both predetermined code phrases indicating the Belgians considered a German attack to be imminent.

== French reaction ==
On the morning of 12 January, Gamelin held a meeting with the highest French operational army commanders and the Chief of Military Intelligence Colonel Louis Rivet. Rivet was sceptical of the warning but Gamelin considered that, even if it were a false alarm, this would be an excellent opportunity to pressure the Belgians into allowing a French advance into their country. Gamelin intended to execute a decisive offensive against Germany in 1941 through the Low Countries; their neutrality would however, be an obstacle to these plans. If this invasion scare would make the Belgians take the side of France and Britain, this awkward problem would be partially solved and strategically vital ground from which to launch the attack effortlessly gained. On the other hand, if Germany really went ahead with the invasion, it was very desirable that the French forces could entrench themselves in central Belgium before the enemy arrived. Both to intensify the crisis and to be ready for any occasion that presented itself, Gamelin thus ordered 1st Army Group and the adjoining Third Army to march towards the Belgian frontier.

== The warning by Sas ==
That their deception plan seemed to prove that the documents were genuine, that day further increased Belgian anxiety; the next day they became convinced the situation was critical. In the evening of 13 January, a message from Colonel Georges Goethals, Belgium's Military Attaché in Berlin, included these words: "Were there tactical orders or parts of them on the Malines plane? A sincere informer, whose credibility may be contested, claims that this plane was carrying plans from Berlin to Cologne in relation to the attack on the West. Because these plans have fallen into Belgian hands, the attack will happen tomorrow to pre-empt countermeasures. I make explicit reservations about this message, that I do not consider reliable, but which it is my duty to report." The "sincere informer" was the Dutch Military Attaché in Berlin Gijsbertus Sas who spoke with Goethals at about 17:00; his information always had to be carefully considered because he was in contact with a German intelligence officer who was an opponent of the Nazi regime, known today to have been Colonel Hans Oster.

General Van Overstraeten, Belgium's military adviser to the King was informed of the message at about 20:00. He was astonished that the informant appeared to know about the capture of the plans. It had not been mentioned in any press report of the crash. It was possible that it was part of a grand German deception plan, but equally possible that it was genuine. Acting on the assumption that it could be taken seriously, Van Overstraeten altered the warning that the Belgian Chief of the General Staff Lieutenant-General Édouard van den Bergen had drafted and which was about to be sent to all Belgian Army commanders on 13 January; whereas it had stated that an attack on the next morning was 'probable', it now said an attack was 'quasi-certain'. Van den Bergen, who had secretly promised Gamelin to bring Belgium in on the allied side, then decided to broadcast (on a popular current affairs radio programme) that night at about 22:30, an immediate recall to their units of all the 80,000 Belgian soldiers on leave. "Phase D", as it was known, would ensure that their forces would be at full strength at the moment of the German attack.

This dramatic gesture was made without reference to Leopold III of Belgium or Van Overstraeten and without knowing the decision that had been taken to keep Germany in the dark about whether Belgium was in possession of its attack plans. Then, again without reference to the King or Van Overstraeten, Van den Bergen ordered the barriers to be moved aside on the southern border with France so that French and British troops could march in swiftly when they were called in, in response to the German attack. If the Germans had indeed attacked on 14 January, Van den Bergen would probably have been congratulated for his energetic decision-making. As it was, he fell into disgrace for acting without the King's permission, as Leopold III was the Supreme Commander of all the Belgian armed forces. Van den Bergen was rebuked so harshly by Van Overstraeten that the Belgian Chief of Staff's reputation never recovered; at the end of January he resigned. One of Van Overstraeten's complaints about Van den Bergen's actions was that he had given the Germans reason to believe that the Dutch had their attack plans.

== Dutch reaction ==
Although Queen Wilhelmina of the Netherlands and her government were alarmed by the Belgian warning, Dutch supreme commander Izaak H. Reijnders was sceptical of the information. When the Belgian military attaché in The Hague, Lieutenant-Colonel Pierre Diepenrijckx, handed him a personal memorandum from Van Overstraeten on 12 January, he responded "Do you believe in these messages yourself? I don't believe in them at all." Again the Dutch were not informed of the precise source, and the Belgians hid the fact that the Germans in these plans only intended a partial occupation of the Netherlands, not including the Dutch National Redoubt, the Vesting Holland.

Whether Reijnders was also warned the next day by Sas is still unknown – after the war he even denied having spoken to the Belgian attaché – but on the morning of 14 January, in reaction to the Belgian alert, he ordered that no leave was to be granted to any soldier – unlike the Belgians, the Dutch thus did not recall anyone – and to close the strategic bridges while fuses should be placed within their explosive charges. The civilian population in the afternoon became worried by the radio broadcast about the leave cancellation. They feared that the Germans would take advantage of the severe cold to cross the New Hollandic Water Line, now that it was frozen. The next week, to reassure the people, much press coverage was given to the motorised circular saws that were available to cut the ice sheets over inundations.

== Climax and anti-climax ==
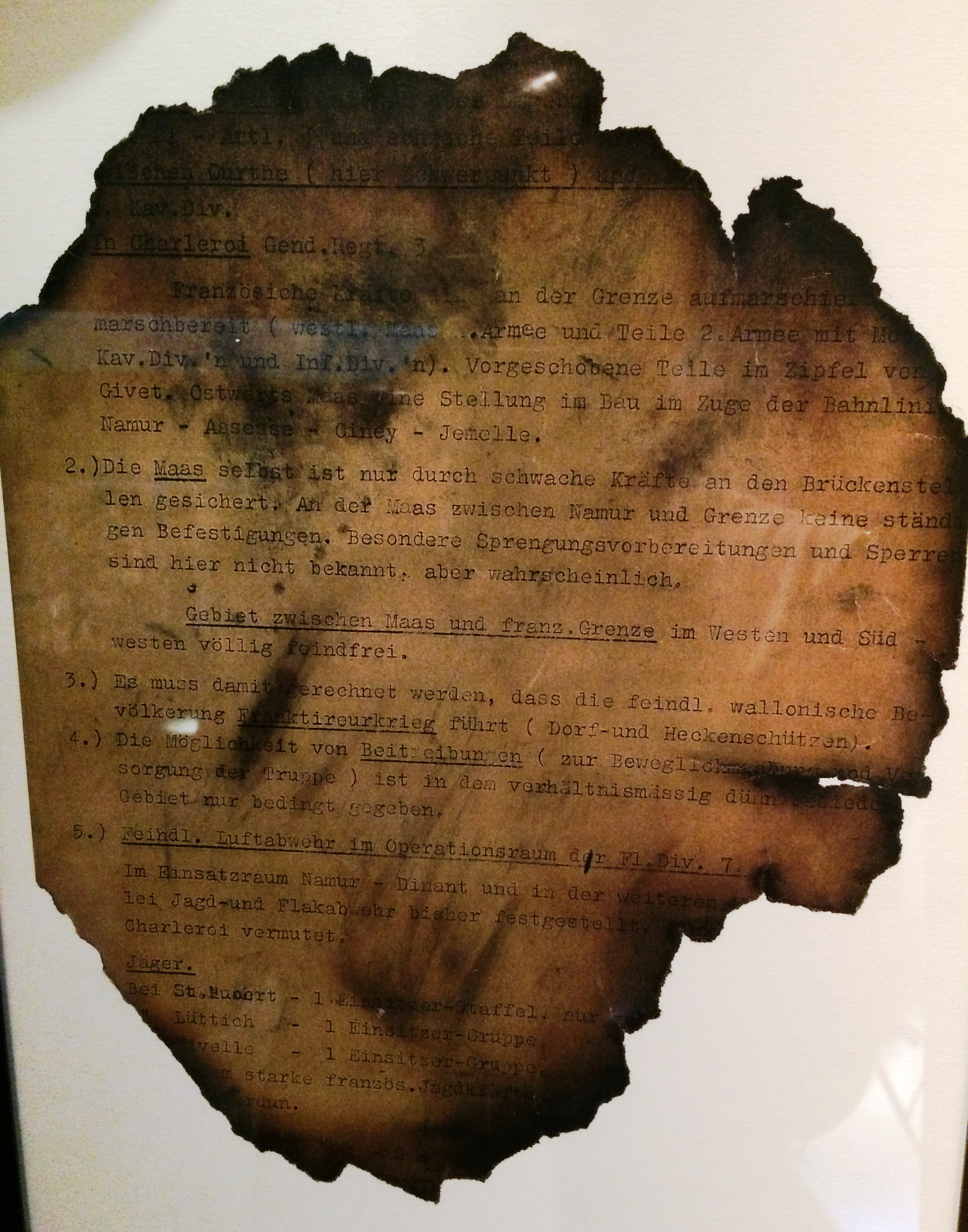
Original German plans captured at Maasmechelen, now in the collection of the Royal Museum of the Armed Forces and Military History in Brussels

The Belgian Government's (second cabinet of Paul van Zeeland) desire to keep their possession of the plans a secret was yet further undermined, this time by the King himself. On the morning of 14 January, he had sent a message to Winston Churchill, then First Lord of the Admiralty, via Admiral Sir Roger Keyes asking for certain guarantees. This was sent through Keyes because he had established himself as the secret link between the British Government and the Belgian King. The aforementioned guarantees included assuring that the Allies would not open negotiations for a settlement of any conflict without Belgium's agreement. Keyes added a rider that he believed Leopold might be able to persuade his government to call the Allies immediately if the guarantees were forthcoming. This was of interest to the Allies because both Britain and France had been trying to persuade Belgium to let their troops in ever since the beginning of the war.

There is no transcript of Keyes' conversation with Churchill but if Keyes really did say what he meant to say then it was changed the further down the line it went. By the time that it reached the French that afternoon, there was no reference to the fact that Keyes was only giving his personal opinion about the calling-in of the Allies. The French record of what was on offer stated that 'the King would ask his Government to ask the Allied armies to occupy defensive positions inside Belgium immediately', if the Belgians received satisfaction in related guarantees. Édouard Daladier, the French Président du Conseil in January 1940, quickly told the British Government that, as far as France was concerned, the guarantees could be given. So the French believed that the Belgians would receive a satisfactory response from the British Government in relation to the guarantees, and would then immediately invite the Allied Armies to march in.

At 15:50 Daladier informed Gamelin that the Belgians had in principle agreed to a French advance and asked whether he was ready to execute it. Gamelin was very pleased, responding that due to heavy snowfall in the area of the Belgian-German border the Germans would be themselves unable to advance quickly, that a German invasion was therefore unlikely and that this posed an ideal situation for a French entrenchment, adding "We must now seize the occasion". Gamelin ordered that the Allied troops under his control during the night of 14–15 January should make their approach march to the Franco-Belgian border so that they would be ready to enter at a moment's notice.

At 16:45 Gamelin was however telephoned by his deputy, the commander of the Western Front General Alphonse Georges. Alarmed by the order, Georges worried that the decision was irreversible and would set a series of events in motion that would make a German invasion inevitable at a moment when the French army and airforce had not yet completed their rearmament. Gamelin lost his temper and abused Georges, forcing him to agree with the order. During the night, the Belgians were told of the manoeuvre. It was only at 8 a.m. on 15 January that Gamelin saw the British response to the guarantees: they were offering a watered down version that was most unlikely to be acceptable to the Belgians. At the same time he received messages from the advancing forces that the Belgian border troops had stopped removing the border obstacles and had not been ordered to allow them entrance into their country. Three hours later Daladier, prompted by the desperate Gamelin who insisted that the premier would make the Belgian government "face up to its responsibilities", told Pol le Tellier, Belgium's Ambassador in Paris, that unless the French had an invitation to enter Belgium by 8 p.m. that evening, they would not only withdraw all British and French troops from the border but would also refuse to carry out similar manoeuvres during further alerts until after the Germans had invaded.

The Belgian cabinet that day proved unable to come to a positive decision about the invitation. The invasion had after all already been predicted for the 14th but failed to materialise. Heavy snowfall continued on the eastern border, making an immediate German attack unlikely. The King and Van Overstraeten, both staunch neutralists, hoped a diplomatic solution could be reached to end the war and had no intention of involving their country unless it were absolutely necessary. At about 12:00 Van Overstraeten ordered the Belgian border troops to rebuild the barriers and reminded them of the standing order to "repulse by force any foreign unit of whatever nationality which violated Belgian territory". At 18:00 Daladier told a disappointed Gamelin he "could not take the responsibility of authorising us to penetrate preventively into Belgium", i.e. violate Belgian neutrality.

== The Germans call off the invasion ==
When Jodl learned on 13 January 1940 that the documents were probably unreadable, he called off plans to execute the attack three days early on 14 January – the same plans that would cause the crisis in Belgium – and postponed them to 15 or 16 January, to be decided as the circumstances demanded. In the evening came the surprising news that the Belgian and Dutch troops – who had already been mobilised since September 1939 – had been put on alert. This was attributed to the crash and the too obvious approach march of the German Sixth Army, the latter causing the element of surprise to be lost. On 15 January road conditions were so poor due to the snowfall and the weather prospects so bleak that Jodl advised Hitler to call the invasion off indefinitely. The Führer hesitantly concurred on 16 January at 19:00.

== Results ==
In the short term no damage appeared to have been done but it has been argued that in the longer term the consequences of this incident were disastrous for Belgium and France. When the real invasion came, on 10 May 1940, the Germans had fundamentally changed their strategy and this change resulted in the swift Fall of France, whereas arguably even a partial German victory would have been far from certain if the original plan had been followed. Determining the exact nature of the causal connection between the incident and the change in strategy has however proven to be problematic.

In the more traditional account of events, the incident caused Hitler to ask for a drastic change of strategy. He told Jodl that "the whole operation would have to be built on a new basis in order to secure secrecy and surprise." The Belgians felt obliged to tell the Germans that they had the attack plan. When Joachim von Ribbentrop, Germany's Foreign Minister, retorted that it was out of date, he would then have been more truthful than he intended. In reaction to Hitler's demand the German High Command would have gone on a search for an alternative, finally finding it in the proposals of General Erich von Manstein, the former Chief of Staff of the German Army Group A, who for some months had been championing a new concept: instead of being committed to the attack detailed in the captured documents, whose principal thrust was on Belgium's north-eastern frontier, the German Panzer Divisions were to be concentrated further south. Jodl recorded on 13 February that Hitler concurred, referring to the Mechelen Incident: "We should then attack in the direction of Sedan," Hitler told Jodl. "The enemy is not expecting us to attack there. The documents held by the Luftwaffe officers who crash landed have convinced the enemy that we only intend to take over the Dutch and Belgian coasts." Within days of this discussion Hitler had personally talked to Von Manstein and the Führer had given it the green light. The plan that had caused so much tumult when it was captured by the Belgians in 1940 was replaced.

However, the importance of the incident has also been vehemently denied. Hitler was already hesitant about the original plan from its very beginning. The postponement was one of many and even on this occasion more to be attributed to the weather conditions than to the disclosure of the content of the documents. As the plan was rather traditional and predictable, no fundamental secrets were compromised and as such there was no direct need for a change. Hitler's demand for surprise referred not to an unpredictable new strategy but to a shortened approach and concentration phase, so that a tactical surprise could be gained before the enemy could react. To this end the armoured divisions were located further west and organisation was improved. There was no direct change in strategic thinking and when an improved concept was finished, within a continuous process of amendments, on 30 January, this Aufmarschanweisung N°3, Fall Gelb ("Deployment Directive, Case Yellow"), did not fundamentally differ from earlier versions. In this view only the fact that some of Von Manstein's friends managed to bring his proposals to Hitler's attention really caused a fundamental turn. The main consequence of the incident would have been that it disclosed, not the German plan, but the way the Allies would deploy in case of an invasion, allowing the Germans to adapt their attack accordingly.

The adoption of the revised Fall Gelb by the Germans, while the Allies were still expecting Hitler to go ahead with the captured version meant that the Germans could set a trap. There would still be an attack made on central Belgium but this would merely be a diversion to pull as many troops as possible to the north while the main German attack fell on the Ardennes, and would then cross the Meuse between Sedan and the area north of Dinant, to penetrate as far as the Channel coast. In doing so the armies in Belgium would be cut off from their supplies and forced to surrender. This ruse may have been clever, but it would only work if Gamelin stuck to his original strategy; which was asking rather a lot, given that until 14 January 1940 his intuition had been impeccable.

However, Gamelin failed to change his strategy on the presumption the Germans would change theirs, despite misgivings from Gort and the British Government. Perhaps the Allies still believed that the captured documents were a 'plant'. Perhaps the British were embarrassed by the size of their contribution, and therefore hesitated to overly criticize their ally's strategy.

Gamelin has been severely criticized for not changing his plan. His stance has been explained as an inability to believe that the very traditional German High Command would resort to innovative strategies, let alone to the even more novel "Blitzkrieg" tactics needed to make them work; any large concentration of forces being supplied through the poor road network in the Ardennes would have had to act very quickly. Also in this respect the incident would thus not have important consequences.

== Aftermath ==
Erich Hoenmanns and Helmuth Reinberger were tried in absentia in Germany and condemned to death. Transporting secret documents by plane without explicit authorisation was strictly forbidden and a capital offence. The verdicts would never be executed. After a stay in an internment camp in Huy both men were evacuated in 1940, first to Britain and then to Canada. Hoenmanns's wife Annie was interrogated by the Gestapo, who feared that her husband was a traitor. She denied this, but from the fact that she was unaware of an extramarital affair of Hoenmanns, it was concluded that she was an unreliable source of information. His two sons were allowed to serve in the army and were killed in action during the war. Later in the war, the men were part of prisoner of war exchanges in 1943 (Hoenmanns) and 1944 (Reinberger). On returning to Germany they were put on trial. Hoenmanns was partially pardoned while Reinberger was fully acquitted.
