= Kurt Oppenländer =

German General in World War II

- Born: 11 February 1892; Ulm, Baden-Württemberg, German Empire
- Died: 17 March 1947 (aged 55); Garmisch-Partenkirchen, Bavaria, Allied-occupied Germany
- Military career
- Allegiance: German Empire; Weimar Republic; Nazi Germany
- Branch: German Army
- Service years: 1911–1945
- Rank: Generalleutnant
- Commands: 305th Infantry Division; 198th Infantry Division
- Conflicts: World War I; World War II; Battle of France; Invasion of Yugoslavia; Operation Barbarossa; Battle of Kiev (1941); Battle of the Caucasus; Battle of Stalingrad
- Awards: Knight's Cross of the Iron Cross

Kurt Oppenländer (11 February 1892 – 17 March 1947) was a general in the Wehrmacht of Nazi Germany during World War II who commanded several divisions. He was a recipient of the Knight's Cross of the Iron Cross. Oppenländer died in American custody on 17 March 1947.

== Awards and decorations ==
- Knight's Cross of the Iron Cross on 25 July 1942 as Generalmajor and commander of 305. Infanterie-Division

Military offices
Preceded by Generalleutnant Kurt Pflugradt	Commander of 305. Infanterie-Division; 12 April 1942 - 1 November 1942	Succeeded by Generalleutnant Bernhard Steinmetz
Preceded by Generalmajor Otto Richter	Commander of 198. Infanterie-Division; 1 August 1944 - 5 August 1944	Succeeded by Generalmajor Alfred Kuhnert
