= 97th Jäger Division =

- Insignia of the 97th Jäger Division
- Active: 1941–1945
- Country: Nazi Germany
- Branch: Army
- Type: Infantry
- Role: light infantry
- Size: Division
- Nicknames: Spielhahn Division; Spielhahnfeder
- Engagements: World War II: Odessa Offensive

Commanders
- Notable commanders: Walter Weiß

The 97th Jäger Division was a light infantry Division of the German Army during World War II. It can trace its origins to the 97th (Light) Infantry Division (97. (leichte) Infanterie-Division) which was formed in December 1940. It was then redesignated the 97th Jäger Division in July 1942.

The division fought in the Battle of Kursk and suffered heavy losses. It was then transferred to the lower Dnieper river area and fought well during the retreat through Ukraine. It was transferred to Slovakia in October 1944 and surrendered to the Red Army near Deutschbrod in May 1945.

== Background ==
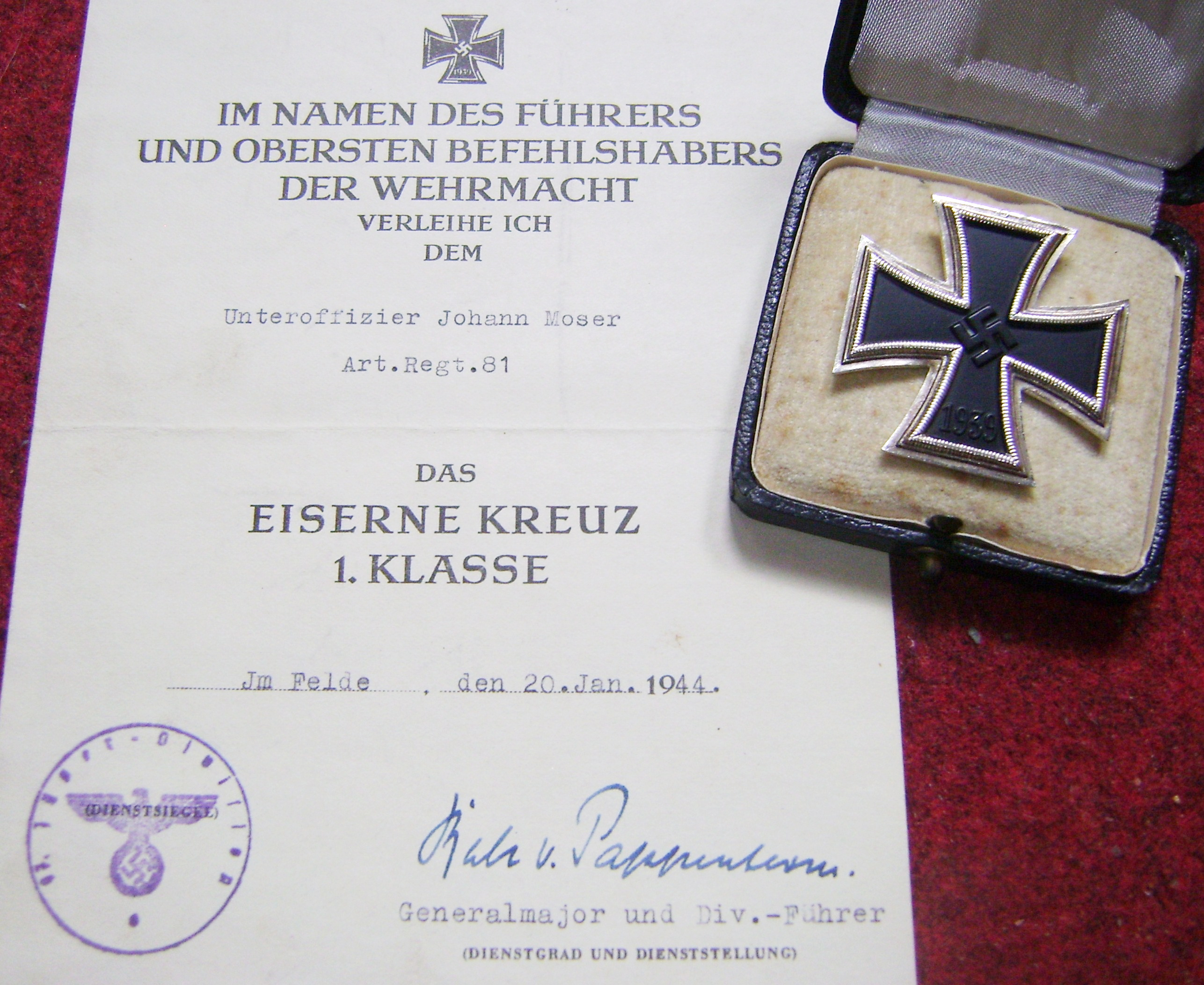
Iron Cross 1st Class issued to a soldier of 81st Artillery Regiment, which was part of the 97th Division

The main purpose of the German Jäger Divisions was to fight in adverse terrain where smaller, coordinated units were more flexibly combat-capable than the brute force offered by the standard infantry divisions. The Jäger divisions were more heavily equipped than mountain divisions, but not as well armed as a larger infantry division. In the early stages of the war, they were the interface divisions fighting in rough terrain and foothills as well as urban areas, between the mountains and plains. The Jägers (hunters in German), relied on a high degree of training and slightly superior communications, as well as their not inconsiderable artillery support. In the middle stages of the war, as the standard infantry divisions were downsized, the Jäger structure of divisions with two infantry regiments became the standard table of organization.

== History ==
On 1 January 1945, the 97th Jäger Division (then part of Army Group Heinrici under Army Group A) had a strength of 10,113 men.

== Commanders ==
- Generaloberst Walter Weiß (15 December 1940 – 15 January 1941)
- General der Infanterie Sigismund von Förster (15 January 1941 – 15 April 1941)
- General der Artillerie Maximilian Fretter-Pico (15 April 1941 – 27 December 1941)
- Generalleutnant Ernst Rupp (1 January 1942 – 30 May 1943)
- Generalmajor Friedrich-Wilhelm Otte (30 May 1943 – 3 June 1943)
- General der Infanterie Ludwig Müller (3 June 1943 – 12 December 1943)
- Generalleutnant Friedrich-Carl Rabe von Pappenheim (13 December 1943 – 17 April 1945)
- Generalmajor Robert Bader (17 April 1945 – 8 May 1945)

== Area of operations ==
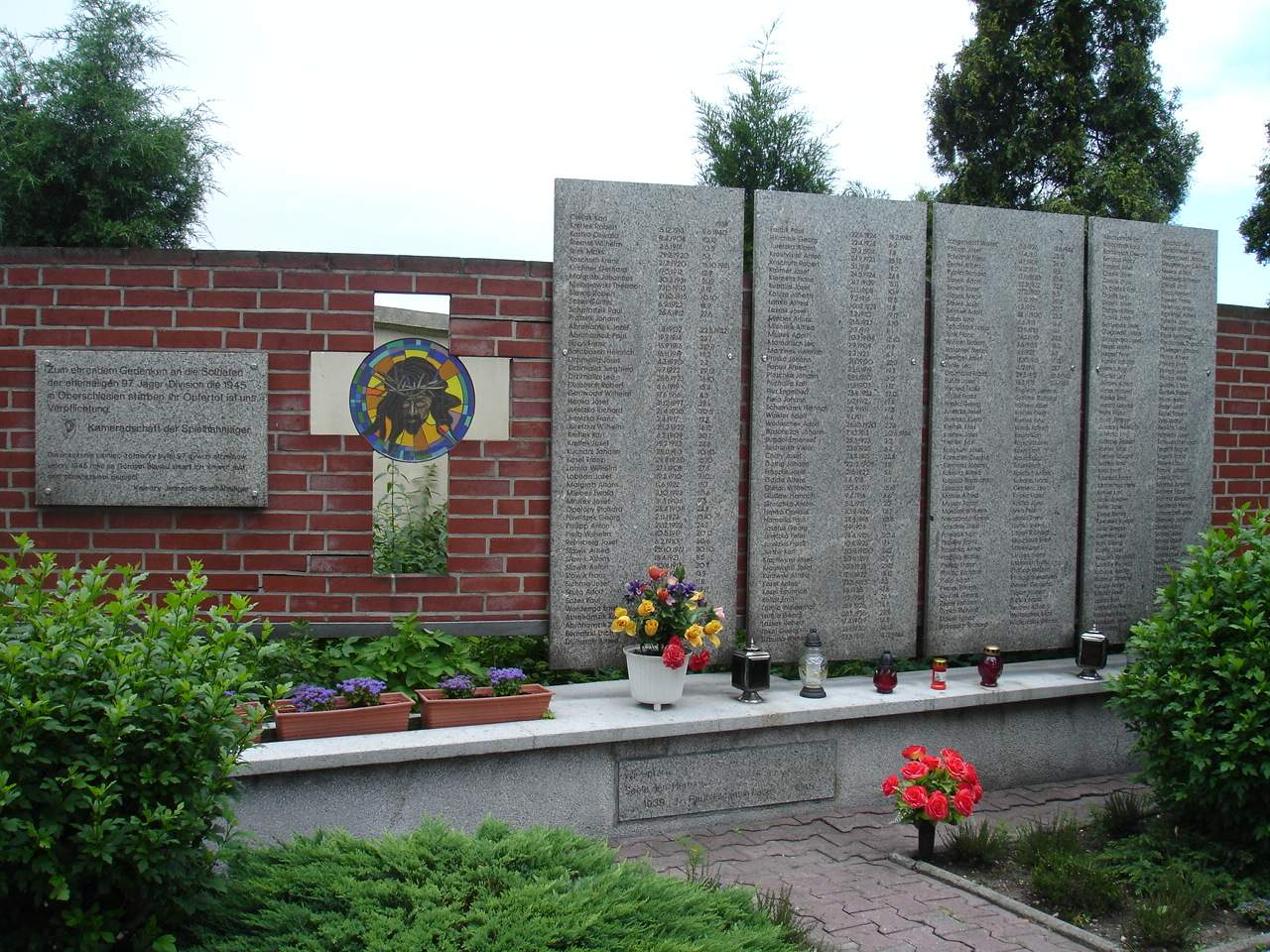
The 97th JD Memorial to the Victims of Wars, Krzanowice

As 97th Light Division

- Germany (Dec 1940 – June 1941)
- Eastern front, southern sector (June 1941 – July 1942)

As 97th Jäger Division

- Eastern front, southern sector (July 1942 – October 1944)
- Slovakia (October 1944 – May 1945) see: Battle of the Dukla Pass

== Order of battle ==
- Jäger Regiment 204
- Jäger Regiment 207
- Reconnaissance Battalion 97
- Artillerie Regiment 81
- Pionier Battalion 97
- Panzerjäger Battalion 97
- Signals Battalion 97
- Feldersatz Battalion 81
- Versorgungseinheiten 97
- Schlächterei-Kompanie 97
