= Otto Lasch =

German general in the Wehrmacht

- Born: 25 June 1893; Pleß, German Empire
- Died: 28 April 1971 (aged 77); Bonn, North Rhine-Westphalia, West Germany
- Military career
- Allegiance: German Empire; Nazi Germany
- Branch: German Army
- Service years: 1914–1918; 1935–1945
- Rank: General of the Infantry
- Conflicts: World War I; World War II
- Awards: Knight's Cross of the Iron Cross with Oak Leaves

Otto Lasch (25 June 1893 in Pleß, Oberschlesien – 28 April 1971) was a German general in the Wehrmacht during World War II who commanded the LXIV Corps. Lasch commanded German forces in the Battle of Königsberg and surrendered the city of 9 April 1945.

== Career ==
After World War I, Lasch served in the Freikorps in the East Prussian city of Lyck. He joined the Wehrmacht in 1935 and later took part in Operation Barbarossa, playing a pivotal role in capturing Riga in early July 1941. He rose to the rank of General of the Infantry and functioned as Commandant of Königsberg in East Prussia from November 1944 onward. As Fortress Commandant of Königsberg he was responsible for defending the city and maintaining order among the flood of refugees fleeing from the advancing Red Army.

Following heavy fighting and a three month siege of the city during the Battle of Königsberg by the 36-division-strong 3rd Byelorussian Front under Ivan Chernyakhovsky, Lasch disobeyed Hitler's orders and surrendered Königsberg to the Red Army on 9 April 1945. As a result of his surrender Hitler sentenced him in absentia to death by hanging, and his family in Berlin (plus his wife and eldest daughter who were in Denmark), was arrested. They were released after the Surrender of the Wehrmacht. Lasch went into Soviet captivity and was convicted as a war criminal in the Soviet Union and sentenced to twenty-five years in a corrective labor camp. He was released in 1955. Lasch died in Bonn in 1971 and is buried in Bad Godesberg with his wife, who predeceased him.

Lasch authored So fiel Königsberg. Kampf und Untergang von Ostpreußens Hauptstadt, which was published in 1958. In 1965 he wrote Zuckerbrot und Peitsche about his years as a Soviet prisoner of war.

== Awards and decorations ==
- Iron Cross (1914) 2nd Class (5 October 1914) & 1st Class (2 July 1916)
- Clasp to the Iron Cross (1939) 2nd Class (13 September 1939) & 1st Class (20 October 1939)
- Knight's Cross of the Iron Cross with Oak Leaves
  - Knight's Cross on 17 July 1941 as Oberst and commander of Infanterie-Regiment 43
  - Oak Leaves on 10 September 1944 Generalleutnant and commander of 349. Infanterie-Division

Military offices
| Preceded by Generalleutnant Friedrich Bayer | Commander of 217. Infanterie-Division; September 27, 1942 - October 1, 1943 | Succeeded by Generalleutnant Walter Poppe |
| Preceded by none | Commander of 349. Infanterie-Division; November 20, 1943 - August 1944 | Succeeded by none |
| Preceded by none | Commander of LXIV. Armeekorps; August 5, 1944 - November 1, 1944 | Succeeded by General der Infanterie Helmut Thumm |
