= 305th Infantry Division =

305th Infantry Division (Bodensee)
- German: 305. Infanterie-Division
- German 305th Infantry Divisional Insignia
- Active: October 1940 – April 1945
- Country: Nazi Germany
- Branch: Heer
- Size: Division
- Part of: German VII Army in France; German VI Army in the Soviet Union; German X Army in Italy
- Nicknames: Bodensee Division; Baden-Württembergische Division; Fels im Meer
- Engagements: Second Battle of Kharkov; Battle of Kalach; Battle of Stalingrad; Operation Achse; Italian Campaign

Commanders
- Notable commanders: Generalleutnant Kurt Oppenländer; General der Artillerie Friedrich-Wilhelm Hauck

The 305th Infantry Division (German: 305. Infanterie-Division) was a German Army unit that saw extensive front-line action during World War II. This division was present at the Battle of Stalingrad, the Battle of Monte Cassino, and surrendered to U.S. Army's 88th Infantry Division in Northern Italy near Trento in late April 1945.

== Formation ==
The 305th Infantry Division was part of the 13th wave of Wehrmacht mobilizations October through November 1940. In December 1940, the 305th Infantry Division was based out of Ravensburg, Upper Swabia on the Bodensee.

== Division history ==
=== Battle of Stalingrad ===
The 305th Infantry Division was under the command of Lieutenant General Kurt Oppenländer during the Battle of Stalingrad. Infantry Regiment 578 was disbanded on 21 December due to the division's inability to maintain three line regiments, and its constituent battalions were redistributed to the division's remaining infantry regiments. The remnants of the division surrendered in Northern Kessel on 2 February 1943.

== First formation ==
- In December 1940, the 305th was acting as a garrison division, absorbing one-third of the 78th Infantry Division and the 296th Infantry Division.
- On 7 February 1942, the division was converted from garrison division to a field division.
- In March 1942 divisions received full armaments and was led up to staff infantry division.
- In May 1942 the division arrived on southern segment front in the Soviet Union, where it participated as part of the VIII Army Corps in the Second Battle of Kharkov and Battle of Kalach.
- From August 1942 onward the division was engaged against Soviet forces towards Stalingrad and later in the city of Stalingrad itself.
- The division was destroyed in the North Sector of Stalingrad in January 1943.
- Last units of the 305th saw action on 1 February 1943 near the tractor factory in the North Sector of Stalingrad. Very few survivors made it out of the city.

== Second formation ==
The 305th Infantry Division was reformed in Brittany during the first half of 1943.

After Mussolini's fall, the division was relocated in August 1943, to the Ligurian coast in the Italian theater of war. During Operation Achse, the division was entrusted with the occupation of the military port of La Spezia, but could not prevent the escape of the Italian warships anchored there.

In October, the division was moved to southern Italy in the eastern section of the Volturno Line, where it took part in defensive battles against the advancing 5th US Army. The division then withdrew to the Sangro River in the eastern section of the Gustav Line. After the fall of the Gustav Line in the spring of 1944, the division, with the Allies in close pursuit, marched towards Umbria and had to be replenished with troops from the 94th Infantry Division.

Before retreating to the Gothic Line in the summer of 1944, it fought against Allied forces in Tuscany near Arezzo and in Casentino. From autumn 1944 to the Allied spring offensive in April 1945, the 305th division was stationed in Romagna, east of Bologna. The division was taken prisoner in May 1945 north of Lake Garda.

== War crimes ==
The division has been implicated in a number of war crimes in Italy between October 1943 and April 1945, with up to twelve civilians executed in each incident.

== Commanding officers ==
- Generalleutnant Kurt Pflugradt (15 December 1940 – 12 April 1942)
- Generalleutnant Kurt Oppenländer (12 April 1942 – 1 November 1942)
- Generalleutnant Bernhard Steinmetz (1 November 1942 – 31 January 1943)
- Dr. Ing. Albrecht Czimatis (31 January 1943 - February 2, 1943), surrendered
- General der Artillerie Friedrich-Wilhelm Hauck (5 March 1943 – December 1944)
- Oberst Friedrich Trompeter (December 1944 – 29 December 1944)
- Generalmajor Friedrich von Schellwitz (29 December 1944 – 23 April 1945), taken POW

== Order of battle ==
=== 1942 ===
- 576th Infantry Regiment
- 577th Infantry Regiment
- 578th Infantry Regiment
- 305th Artillery Regiment
- 305th Pioneer Battalion
- 305th Anti-tank Battalion
- 305th Communications Battalion
- 305th Supply Unit

=== 1944 ===
- 576th Grenadier Regiment
- 577th Grenadier Regiment
- 578th Grenadier Regiment
- 305th Fusilier Battalion
- 305th Artillery Regiment
- 305th Pioneer Battalion
- 305th Anti-tank Battalion
- 305th Communications Battalion
- 305th Field Replacement Battalion
- 305th Supply Unit

== Knight's Cross Holders ==
- Kurt Oppenländer (25 July 1942)
- Wilhelm Braun (20 January 1943)
- Josef Bruetsch (17 February 1945)
