= Stare Olesno =

- Village
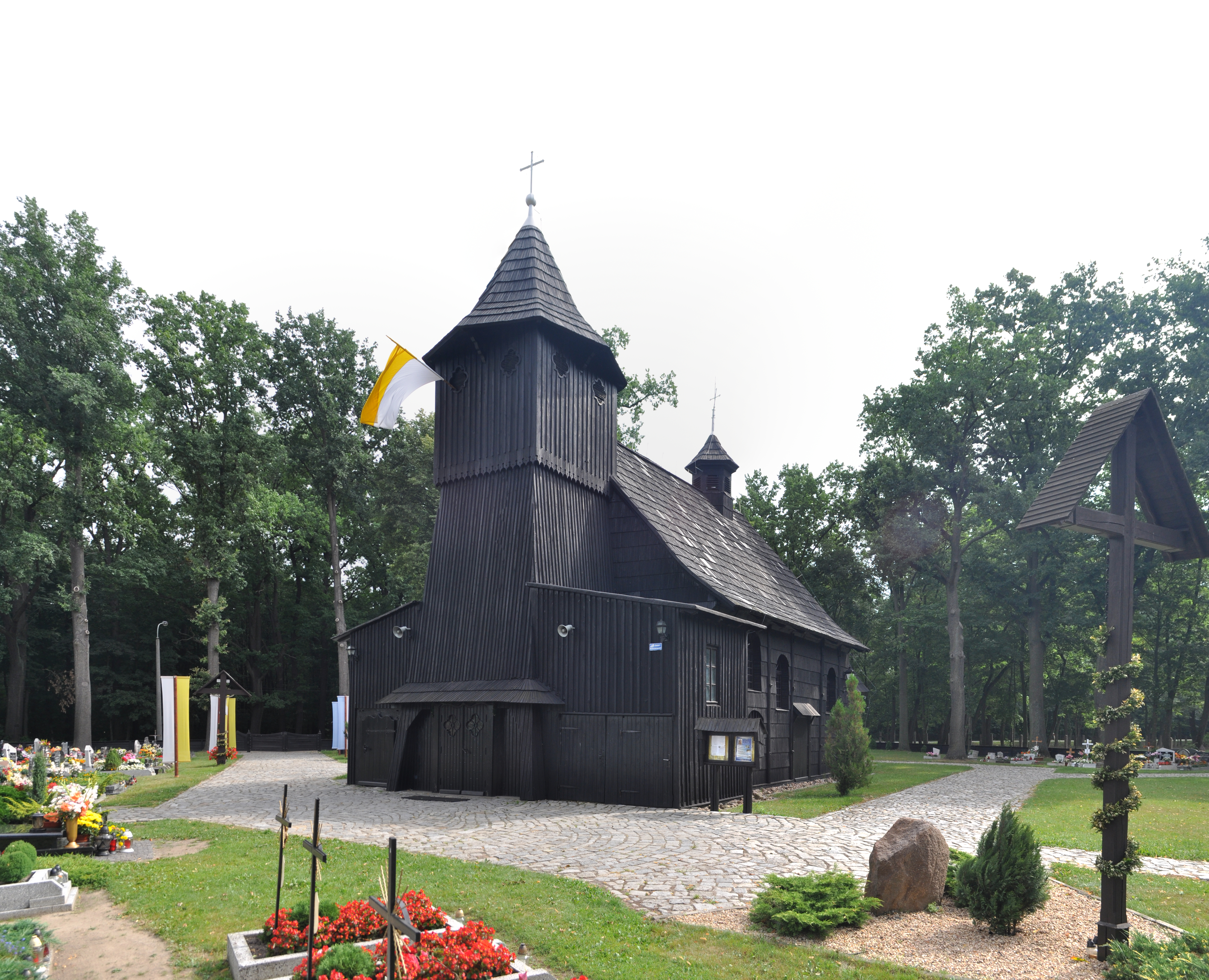
- Church in Stare Olesno

- Location within Poland
- Coordinates: 50°55′N 18°21′E
- Country: Poland
- Voivodeship: Opole
- County: Olesno
- Gmina: Olesno

Stare Olesno [ˈstarɛ ɔˈlɛsnɔ] (German: Alt Rosenberg) is a village in the administrative district of Gmina Olesno, within Olesno County, Opole Voivodeship, in south-western Poland.

== Notable residents ==
- Konrad Barde (1897–1945), general
