= Ernst Rupp =

Ernst Johann Rupp
- Born: 13 January 1892
- Died: 30 May 1943 (aged 51); Krymsk, Soviet Union
- Military career
- Allegiance: Nazi Germany
- Branch: Army
- Service years: 1911–1943
- Rank: Generalleutnant
- Commands: 97th Jäger Division
- Conflicts: World War II: Battle of France; Operation Barbarossa; Battle of Smolensk (1941); Battle of the Caucasus †
- Awards: Knight's Cross of the Iron Cross

Ernst Johann Rupp (13 January 1892 – 30 May 1943) was a German general in the Wehrmacht during World War II who commanded the 97th Jäger Division. He was a recipient of the Knight's Cross of the Iron Cross of Nazi Germany. Rupp was killed on 30 May 1943, near Krymsk, Soviet Union during the operations at the Kuban bridgehead.

== Awards and decorations ==
- Knight's Cross of the Iron Cross on 7 March 1943 as Generalleutnant and commander of 97. Jäger-Division

Military offices
Preceded by General der Artillerie Maximilian Fretter-Pico	Commander of 97. Jäger-Division; 1 January 1942 – 30 May 1943	Succeeded by Generalmajor Friedrich-Wilhelm Otte
