= May 1941 Sanski Most revolt =

Revolt in Axis-occupied Yugoslavia

- Part of World War II in Yugoslavia
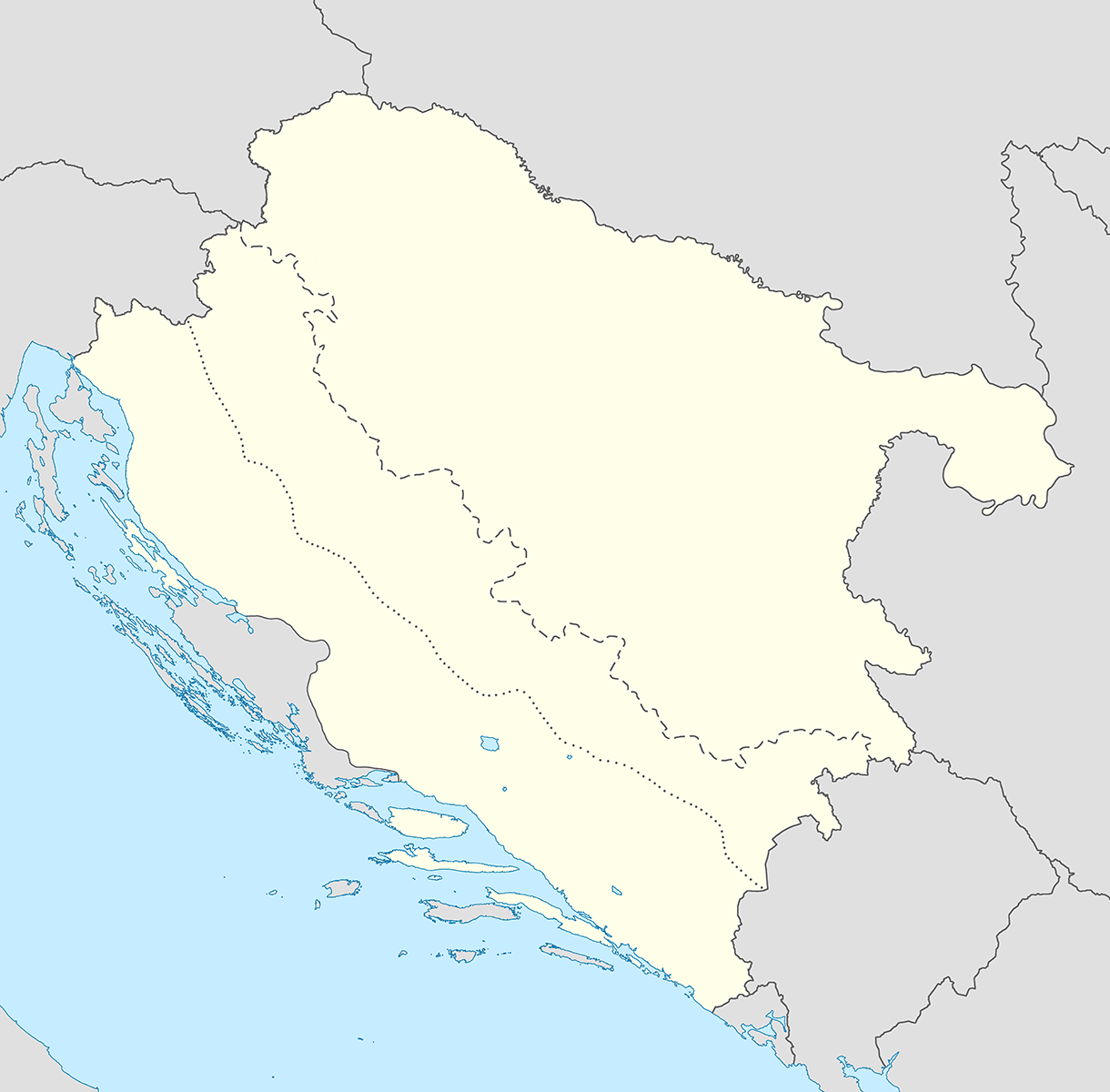
- Location of Sanski Most in the Independent State of Croatia May 1941 Sanski Most revolt (Bosnia and Herzegovina) =
Date	6 – 8 May 1941
Location	Villages south-east of Sanski Most, Independent State of Croatia (present-day Bosnia and Herzegovina)
Result	Uprising suppressed

Belligerents
Serb insurgents: Detachment of volunteers; Former members of reserve military units; Serb villagers from Kijevo, Vidovići, Tramošnja, Kozica and other neighboring places	Axis powers: (Independent State of Croatia) Ustaše Muslims from Kijevo; (Independent State of Croatia) Ustaše Gendarmerie; (Nazi Germany) The 132nd Infantry Division; One company of 132 Pioneer Battalion; 3rd battalion of the 436 Infantry Regiment; Motorized infantry battalion from Bosanski Novi strengthened with one artillery battery of two cannons

Commanders and leaders
Unknown	(Nazi Germany) Rudolf Sintzenich; (Nazi Germany) von Pappenheim; (Nazi Germany) Henigs

Casualties and losses
Several dozens Serb peasants killed during the uprising 27 Serb civilians executed after the suppression of the uprising	2–6 Ustaše wounded 2–3 Nazis wounded

The May 1941 Sanski Most revolt (also known as the Đurđevdan uprising (Serbian: Ђурђевдански устанак) or the rebellion of the Sana peasants (Serbian: Побуна санских сељака)) occurred near the town of Sanski Most in what was at the time Axis-occupied Yugoslavia. The Serb population revolted against oppression by the Ustaše regime, the rulers of the Independent State of Croatia who were sponsored by Nazi Germany and Fascist Italy. Many civilians died during the three days of hostilities.

== Introduction ==
On 6 May 1941, during Đurđevdan slava, an Eastern Orthodox holy day in honour of Saint George, the uprising began in Kijevo and Tramošnja villages and continued for three days. It was the first episode of hostility against the occupying forces.

The celebration of Đurđevdan in Kijevo and Tramošnja was disturbed by the Ustaše. This provoked local Serb civilians to rise up against the Ustaše. To suppress the uprising, the Ustaše requested help from Germany. On 7–8 May 1941, German infantry and artillery forces arrived in the villages. They took 450 Serb civilians hostage. By 8 May 1941, the uprising was suppressed. Many Serb civilians were killed. Up to three Nazis and two Ustaše were injured. On 9 May 1941, 27 Serb civilians were executed in retaliation. Their bodies were hanged in the center of Sanski Most. In 1973, their bodies were interred in a memorial in Sušnjar.

== Background ==
The Independent State of Croatia (NDH) was a World War II puppet state of Nazi Germany and Italy. It was created on 10 April 1941 from part of Democratic Federal Yugoslavia which had been occupied by the Axis powers. The Independent State of Croatia consumed most of current day Croatia and Bosnia and Herzegovina and part of Serbia.

Oppression by the Ustaše regime was directed at Serbs, Jews, Muslims and Roma people, as part of a larger campaign of genocide. In Sanski Most, NDH officials, including Viktor Gutić, commissioner incited local Croats and Muslims to attack Serbs. On 23 April 1941, Gutić ordered all Serbs and Montenegrins living in the Bosanska Krajina, who had been born in Serbia or Montenegro, to leave the area within five days. This edict, which had been publicised on local radio and in the press was executed by some local Croats and Muslims. Eugen Dido Kvaternik, a Croatian nationalist politician, and Ante Pavelić, the Croatian fascist dictator, were involved. Under the premise that Đurđevdan, also known as the day of hajduk (bandits), was one of Serb rebel gatherings, they attacked notable Serb civilians.

== 6 May 1941 ==
Oppression by the Ustaše regime caused spontaneous resistance by civilians which developed into armed uprisings in villages south-east of Sanski Most.

On 6 May 1941, hostilities were precipitated by Ustaše (mostly Muslims) breaking into houses of Serb civilians in Kijevo and Donja Tramošnja. In Tramošnja, several houses were burned. A group of about twenty Serb civilians, most of them with no firearms, prevented the burning of other houses. Up to six Ustaše were injured. The Serb civilians were joined by former members of reserve military units and villagers from Sjenokosi hamlet. The Serb civilians chased away the Ustaše who escaped to Kijevo and Sanski Most and requested help from the German garrison in Prijedor.

== 7 May 1941 ==
On the morning of 7 May 1941, Ustaše authorities imprisoned several notable Serb civilians in the army barracks at the railway station. The population was warned they would be executed if harm came to any member of the Ustaše or German army. One member of the Ustaše, a local forest ranger, may have intentionally wounded himself and then reported to Ustaše authorities in Sanski Most that he had been attacked and wounded by the Serb civilians.

The Germans sent a reconnaissance patrol of one platoon. The forty-two soldiers of the 1st Battalion of the 132nd Infantry Division stationed in Prijedor arrived on 7 May 1941. Together with Ustaše and gendarmes, they chased the insurgent Serb civilians. In the early morning of 7 May 1941, Ustaše killed three Serb civilians in Sanski Most.

The Serb civilians, buoyed by their success of the day before, resisted. Serbs from Banja Luka, Prijedor and Sanski Most traveled to Tramošnja to join the fight. They numbered about 200 and were armed with various types of rifles, one machine-gun and one automatic gun. They positioned their force in Kijevo and Tomina. The Serb civilians from Kijevo, Vidovići, Tramošnja, Kozica and other neighbouring places quickly took defensive positions on the slopes of Kijevska Gora above Sjenokos. They resisted the attack of the Axis forces. In this battle, three German soldiers were wounded.

== 8 May 1941 ==
Rudolf Sintzenich, general and commander of the 132nd Infantry Division ordered the 3rd battalion of the 436 Infantry Regiment (von Pappenheim) to entrain at 0200h. Their route was from Banja Luka to Sanski Most via Prijedor. The 3rd battalion was commanded by Henigs. One company of 132 Pioneer Battalion traveled by bicycle and one motorised battery from Kostajnica joined Henig's forces.

On 8 May 1941, the German force was strengthened by motorized infantry from Bosanski Novi and a battery of two cannons from the Artillery division garrisoned in Prijedor. Before firing, the Germans captured 450 Serbs. Between 8 and 11 a.m., the German forces fired 38 grenades from two cannons positioned in Čaplje, killing several dozen Serbs. After shelling Tramošnja and Kijevska Gora (a mountain near Kijevo), the German forces moved toward Tomina, Podovi and Kozica villages.

The uprising was suppressed on 8 May 1941. Germans and Ustaše burned all the houses at Sjenokose hamlet, Kijevo. Many Serb civilians were captured unarmed, having discarded their weapons. The Serb civilians of Tomina were released at the intervention of an Italian soldier. However, the German forces did transport about thirty Serb prisoners from the Tomina area to Sanski Most, even though they had not individually participated in the hostilities.

== Aftermath ==
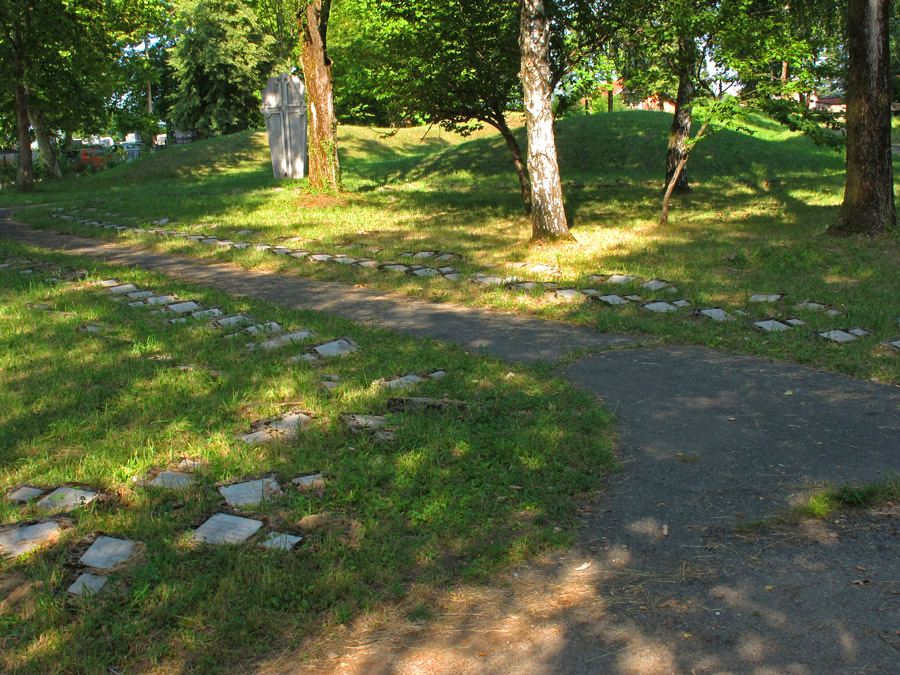
The memorial complex, Šušnjar

On 9 May 1941, Germans killed twenty-seven Serb civilians. Jews and Serb civilians were forced to hang the bodies in the center of Sanski Most. The bodies remained hanging for two days.

At the end of May 1941, Gutić said, "The roads will wish for the Serbs, but Serbs will be no more." He announced further measures to kill all Serb civilians. The Đurđevdan uprising and the June 1941 uprising in eastern Herzegovina preceded a general uprising organized by the Communist Party of Yugoslavia.

Until the end of July 1941, most of the leaders of the Đurđevdan uprising hid in a wooded area near Kmećani and planned their next action. The Ustaše oppression and harassment of Serbs and Jews in retaliation to the Đurđevdan uprising continued.

Following the collapse of the NDH in 1945, Gutić fled to Austria and Italy. In Venice he was recognized, arrested, and taken to a camp in Grottaglie. In early 1946, he was extradited to Yugoslavia and in Sarajevo he was sentenced to death. On 20 February 1947, Gutić's execution was carried out in Banja Luka.

In 1971, Serb civilians killed during this conflict were interred in a Memorial complex in Šušnjar. In July 2003, the complex was renewed and designated a national monument of Bosnia and Herzegovina.

== Sources ==
- Bokan, Branko (1972). Podgrmeč u NOB.: Podgrmeč do ustanka i u ustanku 1941. Vojnoizdavački zavod.
- Đurđev B.; et al. (1973). 1941, Hiljadu devetsto četrdeset i prva, u historiji naroda Bosne i Hercegovine: Naučni skup, održan u Drvaru od 7. do 9. Oktobra 1971 [n the history of the people of Bosnia and Herzegovina: conference held in Drvar October 7 – 9, 1971] (in Bosnian). Institut za istoriju radničkog pokreta. Sarajevo: Veselin Masleša.
- Petranović, Branko (1992). Srbija u drugom svetskom ratu: 1939-1945. Vojnoizdavaćki i Novinski Centar.
- Dizdar, Zdravko; Grčić, Marko; Ravlić, Slaven; Stuparić, Darko (1997). Tko je tko u NDH (in Serbo-Croatian). Zagreb: Minerva. ISBN 953-6377-03-9.
- Avakumović, Ivan; Nikolić, Kosta (2004). Михаиловић према немачким документима. Institut za savremenu istoriju. ISBN 9788674030882.
- Dodik, P. (2011). Šušnjar 1941: zbornik saopštenja, svjedočenja i dokumenata [Šušnjar 1941: collection of announcements, testimonies and documents] (in Serbian). Oštra Luka: Opština Oštra Luka. ISBN 978-99938-41-08-1.
