= Friedrich-Wilhelm Hauck =

German general

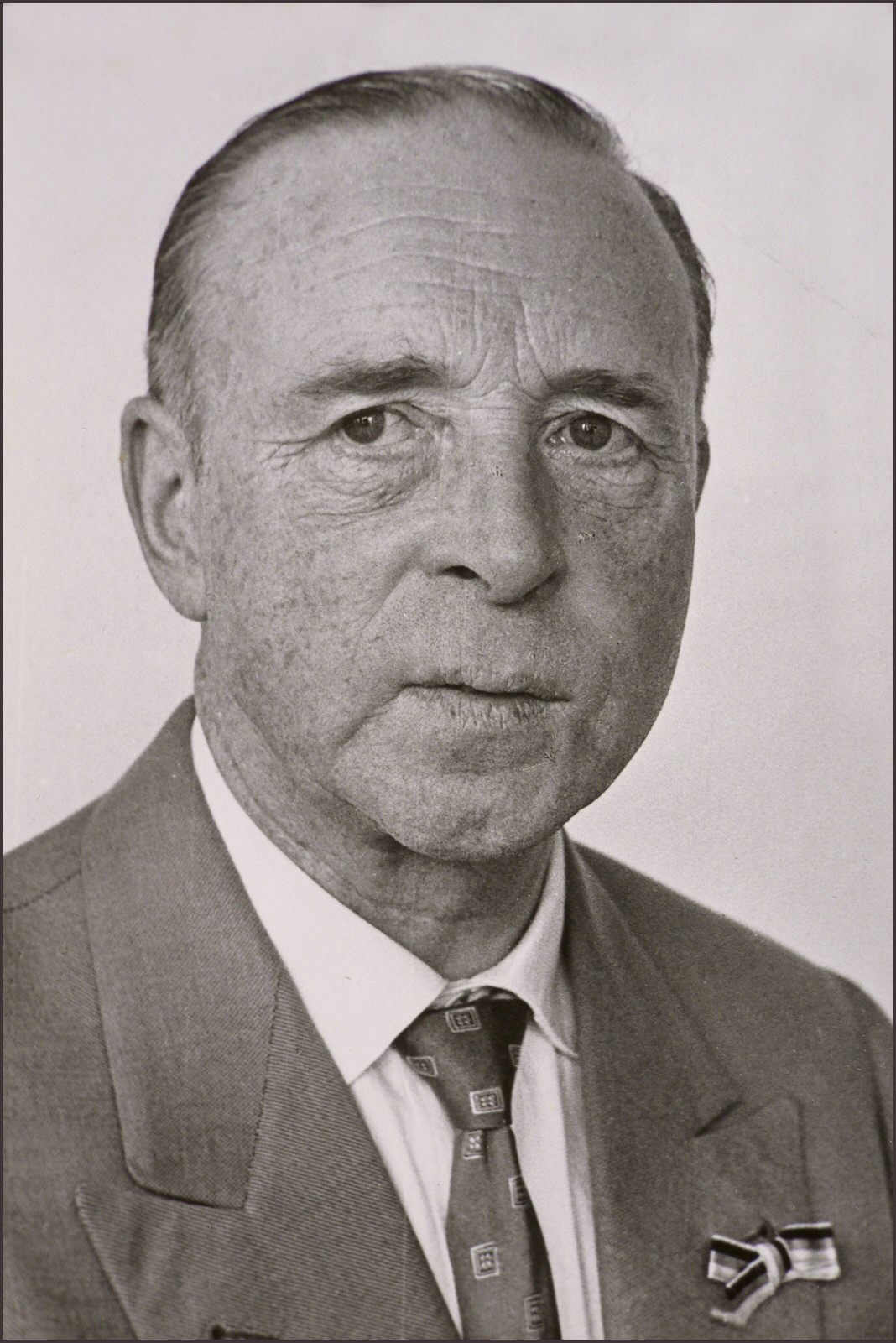
- Born: 10 January 1897; Breslau, Province of Silesia, Kingdom of Prussia, German Empire
- Died: 15 April 1979 (aged 82); Überlingen, Baden-Württemberg, West Germany
- Relatives: ∞ 1924 Ruth Viebig; 4 children
- Military career
- Allegiance: German Empire; Weimar Republic; Nazi Germany
- Branch: Imperial German Army; Reichsheer; German Army
- Service years: 1914–1945
- Rank: General der Artillerie
- Commands: Grenadier-Regiment 386; 305th Infantry Division; LXIV Army Corps; LI Mountain Corps
- Conflicts: World War I; World War II; Phoney War; Battle of France; Operation Barbarossa; Siege of Sevastopol (1941–1942); Battle of the Kerch Peninsula; Italian Campaign; Operation Diadem; Gothic Line Offensive
- Awards: Knight's Cross of the Iron Cross
- Other work: Military author

Ewald Kurt Friedrich-Wilhelm Hauck (10 January 1897 – 15 April 1979) was a German general during World War II who commanded several corps. He was a recipient of the Knight's Cross of the Iron Cross.

== Life ==
Friedrich-Wilhelm Hauck was the son of Paul Hauck, a Landesrat (member of a provincial government) and government councilor, and his wife Luise, née Wagner. Shortly after the outbreak of the First World War, he volunteered for the 1st Silesian Field Artillery Regiment "von Peucker" No. 6. In the spring of 1915, he marched off to the battlefields of the First World War with the newly formed Baden Field Artillery Regiment No. 104. In 1917, he became an officer candidate and was appointed a 2nd Lieutenant in the reserves on 12 June 1917. He was transferred to active duty on 12 September 1918.

He served for many years in the Reichswehr and was transferred to the Wehrmacht as a General Staff officer in 1935. In the autumn of 1936, he was assigned as Ia (Operations Officer) to the 2nd Infantry Division. On 10 November 1938, he was transferred as Ia to the staff of the V Army Corps. He then participated with the V Army Corps in the Phoney War and the Western Campaign. During the Western Campaign, on 1 June 1940, he was appointed Chief of the General Staff of the Higher Command for Special Purposes XXXVII. On 18 February 1941, he relinquished his post as Chief of the General Staff of the Higher Command for Special Purposes XXXVII. He was then appointed Quartermaster General of the 11th Army. On 18 September 1942, he was transferred to the Army General Staff and assigned to the Quartermaster General. On 27 November 1942, he was given command of Grenadier Regiment 386. On 5 March 1943, he relinquished this command and was appointed commander of the 305th Infantry Division. Under his command in WWII, the 305th Infantry Division were implicated in war crimes in Italy, but he was never charged.

On 24 November 1944, he was assigned the deputy command of the LXXVI Panzer Corps. On 7 December 1944, he relinquished command of the corps and was transferred to the Führerreserve (Officer Reserve). In January 1945, he attended a course for commanding generals in Hirschberg. In mid-January 1945, he was assigned command of the LXIV Army Corps. He relinquished command at the end of January 1945 and was then assigned command of the LI Mountain Army Corps. On 20 April 1945, he was promoted to General of the Artillery and simultaneously appointed Commanding General of the LI Mountain Army Corps. With the surrender of the Army Group C in Italy, he was taken prisoner of war on 2 May 1945.

Released from US captivity at the beginning of 1948, he worked for the Evangelical Relief Organization, as Eugen Gerstenmaier's office manager. Over six years, he wrote on behalf of the United States Army and with the collaboration of six other former German generals, The Operations of the German Army Groups on the Eastern Front 1941–1945, Southern Territory. With an assessment by Colonel-General Franz Halder, and a letter of thanks from the Commander-in-Chief of the United States Army in Germany, he transferred the work (16 volumes) to the Federal Archives-Military Archives in Freiburg im Breisgau.

== Promotions ==
- 1 September 1914 Kriegsfreiwilliger (War Volunteer)
- 10 March 1915 Gefreiter (Private E-2 / Lance Corporal)
- 5 November 1915 Unteroffizier (NCO / Corporal / Junior Sergeant)
- 22 August 1916 Vizefeldwebel (Vice Sergeant / Vice Staff Sergeant)
- 12 June 1917 Leutnant der Reserve (2nd Lieutenant of the Reserves)
- 12 September 1918 Leutnant (active 2nd Lieutenant) with Patent from 19 February 1916
  - 1 July 1922 received Reichswehr Rank Seniority (RDA) from 1 September 1915 (319)
- 31 July 1925 Oberleutnant (1st Lieutenant) with effect and RDA from 1 April 1925 (272)
- 1 August 1931 (1) Hauptmann (Captain)
- 18 January 1936 Major with effect from 1 January 1936 and RDA from 1 December 1935 (64a)
- 31 December 1938 Oberstleutnant (Lieutenant Colonel) with effect and RDA from 1 January 1939 (69)
  - 20 March 1939 received new and improved RDA from 1 January 1938 (65a)
- 20 November 1940 Oberst (Colonel) with effect and RDA from 1 December 1940 (30)
- 15 May 1943 Generalmajor (Major General) with effect and RDA from 1 June 1943 (11)
- 20 March 1944 Generalleutnant (Lieutenant General) with effect and RDA from 1 March 1944 (1)
- 15 April 1945 (telex date) General der Artillerie (General of the Artillery) with effect and RDA from 20 April 1945

== Awards and decorations ==
- Iron Cross (1914), 2nd and 1st Class
  - 2nd Class on 27 October 1916
  - 1st Class on 14 May 1918
- Wound Badge (1918) in Black on 19 October 1919
- Honour Cross of the World War 1914/1918 with Swords on 30 December 1934
- Wehrmacht Long Service Award, 4th to 1st Class
  - 2nd Class on 2 October 1936
  - 1st Class in 1939
- Sudetenland Medal
- Repetition Clasp 1939 to the Iron Cross 1914, 2nd and 1st Class
  - 2nd Class on 21 April 1940
  - 1st Class on 3 June 1940
- Order of the Star of Romania, Commander's Cross with Swords on 19 September 1941
- German Cross in Silver on 6 July 1942
- Winter Battle in the East 1941–42 Medal on 10 August 1942
- Crimea Shield on 10 September 1942
- Knight's Cross of the Iron Cross on 11 June 1944 as Generalleutnant and Commander of the 305. Infanterie-Division

== Sources ==
- German Federal Archives: BArch PERS 6/607 and PERS 6/299804

Military offices
Preceded by Generalleutnant Bernhard Steinmetz	Commander of 305. Infanterie-Division; 5 March 1943 - ? December 1944	Succeeded by Oberst Friedrich Trumpeter
Preceded by General der Infanterie Helmut Thumm	Commander of LXIV. Armeekorps; 15 January 1945 - 21 January 1945	Succeeded by General der Artillerie Max Grimmeiß
Preceded by General der Gebirgstruppe Valentin Feurstein	Commander of LI. Gebirgs-Armeekorps; 24 January 1945 - 2 May 1945	Succeeded by none
