= Alfred Kuhnert =

- Born: 19 March 1898
- Died: 28 November 1977 (aged 79)
- Military career
- Allegiance: Nazi Germany
- Branch: German Army
- Service years: 1914–19; 1935–1945
- Rank: Generalmajor
- Commands: 198th Infantry Division; 26th Panzer Division
- Conflicts: World War I World War II
- Awards: Knight's Cross of the Iron Cross
- Other work: Police officer

Alfred Kuhnert (19 March 1898 – 28 November 1977) was a German general during World War II who commanded several divisions. He was a recipient of the Knight's Cross of the Iron Cross of Nazi Germany.

== Awards ==
- Knight's Cross of the Iron Cross on 20 April 1944 as Oberst and commander of Grenadier-Regiment 51 (motorized)

Military offices
| Preceded by Generalleutnant Kurt Oppenländer | Commander of 198. Infanterie-Division; 6 August 1944 – 1 September 1944 | Succeeded by Generalmajor Otto Schiel |
| Preceded by Oberst Carl Stollbrock | Commander of 26. Panzer-Division; 29 January 1945 – 28 February 1945 | Succeeded by Generalleutnant Viktor Linnarz |
