= Maximilian Fretter-Pico =

German general (1892–1984)

- Born: 6 February 1892; Karlsruhe, German Empire
- Died: 4 April 1984 (aged 92); Kreuth, West Germany
- Relatives: Otto Fretter-Pico (brother)
- Military career
- Allegiance: German Empire; Weimar Republic; Nazi Germany
- Branch: German Army
- Service years: 1910–1945
- Rank: General der Artillerie
- Commands: XXX Army Corps; 6th Army
- Conflicts: World War I World War II
- Awards: Knight's Cross of the Iron Cross with Oak Leaves

Maximilian Fretter-Pico (6 February 1892 – 4 April 1984) was a German general during World War II. He was a recipient of the Knight's Cross of the Iron Cross with Oak Leaves of Nazi Germany.

A veteran of WWI, he would serve in the Battle of France, in the Eastern Front and in Hungary.

== Early life ==
Fretter-Pico was born on 6 February 1892 in Karlsruhe, Grand Duchy of Baden, in the German Empire, joining the Field Artillery Regiment "Grand Duke" (1st Badisches) No. 14 (German: Feldartillerie-Regiment „Großherzog“ (1. Badisches) Nr. 14) of the Prussian Army in Karlsruhe on 20 September 1910 as an officer candidate, and attended the Military School in Danzig from March to November 1911. On 27 January 1912 he was promoted to lieutenant (German: Leutnant) and completed a course at the artillery school in Jüterbog from September 1913 to January 1914.

== First World War ==
With his regiment he went to the First World War as an adjutant and took over an anti-balloon gun platoon in January 1915. On 18 September 1915 he was promoted to senior lieutenant (German: Oberleutnant). In May 1916 he gave up his command again and worked as an adjutant in various brigades and divisions until 1918. In January and February 1918 he completed general staff training in the high command of the Army Group Duke Albrecht von Württemberg. Before the end of the war, he was promoted to captain (German: Hauptmann) on 18 October 1918 and as such he was accepted into the Reichswehr.

== Interwar Years ==
There he was first active in the staff of the 1st (Prussian) Artillery Regiment (German: 1. (Preußischen) Artillerie-Regiments) in Königsberg and was then transferred to the staff of Group Command 1 (German: Gruppenkommandos 1) in Berlin until April 1923. This was followed by an activity in the Ministry of the Reichswehr in the Army Operations Department T 1 (German: Heeres-Operationsabteilung T 1) until October 1927, which was only interrupted by a one-year transfer from October 1925 to October 1926 as a company commander in the 6th (Prussian) Artillery Regiment (German: 6. (Preußische) Artillerie-Regiment) in Hanover.

He then returned to Hanover as chief of the 8th Battery of the 6th Artillery Regiment (German: 8. Batterie des 6. Artillerie-Regiments) and held this command until September 1930. After Fretter-Pico had completed a two-month training course at the Army Riding School (German: Heeres-Reitschule), he was transferred to the staff of the 1st Cavalry Division (German: 1. Kavallerie-Division) moved to Königsberg. He stayed there until October 1933. On 1 April 1932 he was promoted to major and on 1 March 1935 to lieutenant colonel (German: Oberstleutnant). In October 1935 he was transferred to the foreign department in the Army High Command and on 1 August 1937 he was promoted to colonel (German: Oberst). In 1938 he was posted to the Turkish Army as a military attaché for a few months until November of the same year. After his return he was appointed Chief of Staff of the General Command of the Saar-Palatinate Border Troops (German: Generalkommandos der Grenztruppen Saarpfalz) in Kaiserslautern.

== Second World War ==
After the beginning of the Second World War, this General Command was renamed XXIV Army Corps on 17 September 1939. As part of the Western Campaign, the corps took part in the fighting in France. On 1 March 1941 Maximilian was promoted to major general (German: Generalmajor) and in April of the same year he was briefly transferred to the Führerreserve. On 19 April 1941 he took over as commander of the 97th Light Infantry Division (German: 97. leichte Infanterie-Division). With this unit he fought from the beginning of Operation Barbarossa, the attack on the Soviet Union, in the area of Army Group South. On 1 November 1941 the division took the city of Artemovsk and, as a measure for the coming winter, expanded it into a supply and refitting center for the 17th Army. To do this, the division had to bring the city out of range of enemy artillery, which was achieved by further advances to the east and the formation of the Troitskoye-Kalinowo-Kaganowitscha line. Although this line went far beyond the defence capabilities of a division and there was insufficient winter equipment, the division was able to repel enemy attacks by the vastly outnumbered enemy troops throughout December.

For the success of his division, Fretter-Pico was awarded the Knight's Cross of the Iron Cross on 27 December 1941 and he was then entrusted the leadership of the XXX. Army Corps. On 15 January 1942 he was promoted to lieutenant general (German: Generalleutnant) and on 1 June 1942 to general of the artillery (German: General der Artillerie) and thus commanding general of the corps (German: Kommandierender General des Korps).

In the winter of 1942/43, Fretter-Pico led the Fretter-Pico army division (German: Armeeabteilung Fretter-Pico), which was temporarily formed from his corps, and then again the XXX. Army Corps. At the beginning of July 1944 he was briefly reassigned to the Führerreserve in order to take over command of the 6th Army in the middle of the month, which was destroyed a little later during the Soviet Jassy-Kishinev operation and then had to be reorganised. Due to the subordination of the Hungarian 2nd and 3rd Army, it was temporarily referred to as the Army Group Fretter-Pico (German: Armeegruppe Fretter-Pico). This formation took part in the Battle of Debrecen, from 6 to 29 October 1944. On 23 December 1944 he gave up his command and was z. b. V. of the Army High Command. On 25 March 1945, he was appointed an assessor in the court-martial in Torgau of General der Panzertruppe Walter Fries. Contrary to Hitler's express order, Fries had given up the city of Warsaw, which had been declared a fortress (German: Festung), and withdrew the German troops. The trial ended on 30 March 1945 with Fries' acquittal, and Fretter-Pico was appointed commander of military district IX, based in Kassel (German: Wehrkreis IX (Kassel)), this being his last command. There he was taken prisoner by the US Army on 22 April 1945, being released in mid-1947.

== Post-War Period ==
In the post-war years he wrote several books in which he dealt with the role of the Wehrmacht.

Maximilian Fretter-Pico died at the age of 92 on 4 April 1984 in Kreuth am Tegernsee. He was buried in Cemetery IV of the Jerusalem and New Churches on Bergmannstrasse in Berlin-Kreuzberg, in the hereditary family grave of the Soltmann family, from which his wife Gertrude (1901-1993) was born.

== Family ==
He was the elder brother of Otto Fretter-Pico (one year younger), also a German general during World War II.

== Awards ==
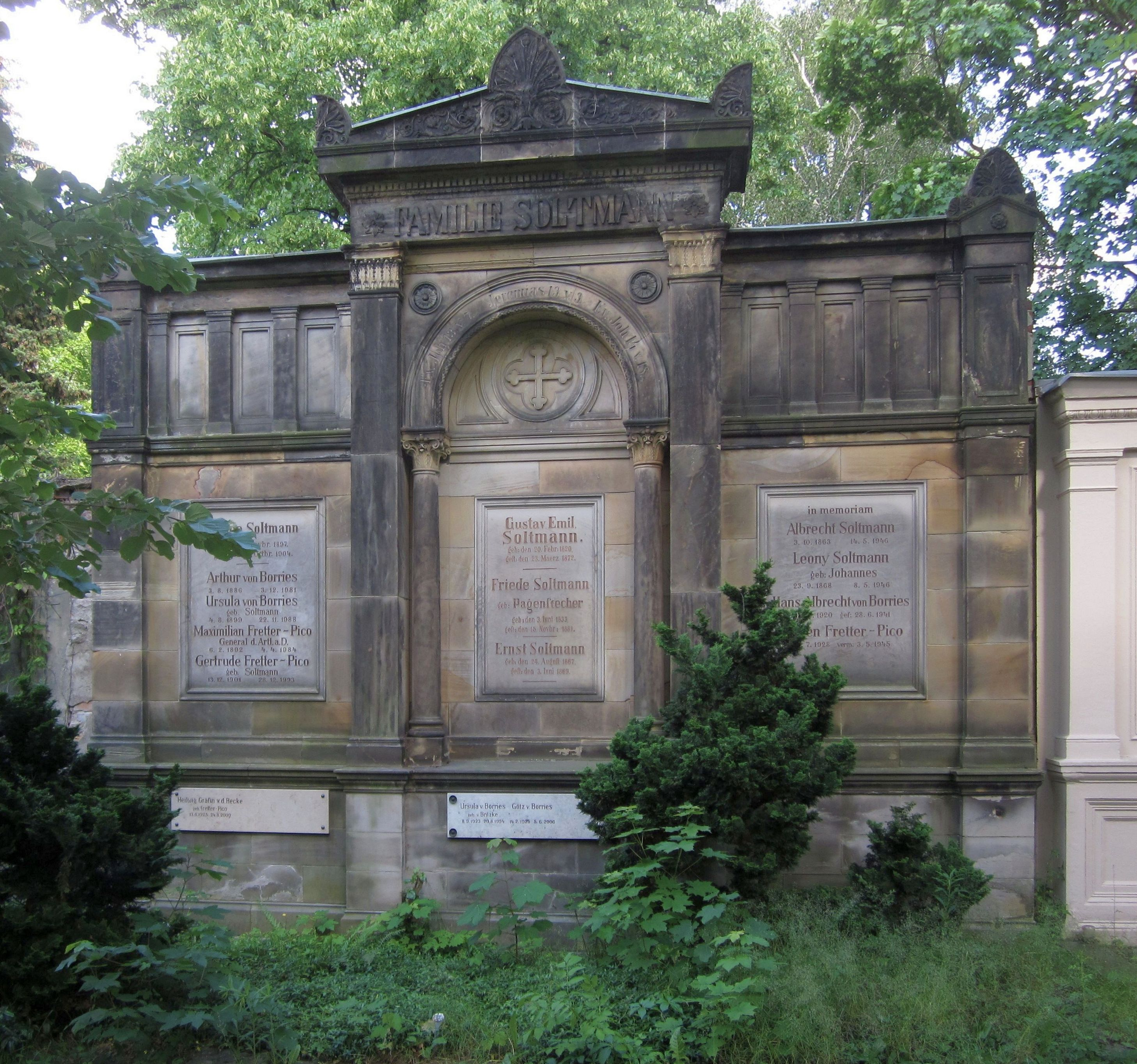
Family grave in Berlin-Kreuzberg.

- Iron Cross (1914) 2nd Class (12 October 1914) & 1st Class (23 December 1916)
- Knight's Cross 2nd Class of the Order of the Zähringer Lion with Swords (10 October 1914)
- Hanseatic Cross of Hamburg (20 January 1918)
- Wound Badge in Black (June 1918)
- Clasp to the Iron Cross (1939) 2nd Class (31 October 1939) & 1st Class (16 June 1940)
- West Wall Medal (22 November 1940)
- German Cross in Gold as General der Artillerie and commanding general of the XXX. Armeekorps (19 September 1942)
- Knight's Cross of the Iron Cross with Oak Leaves
  - Knight's Cross as Generalmajor and commander of the 97. leichte Infanterie-Division (26 December 1941)
  - Oak leaves as General der Artillerie and commanding general of the XXX. Armeekorps (16 January 1944)

== Works ==
- Mißbrauchte Infanterie – Deutsche Infanterie-Divisionen im osteuropäischen Großraum 1941 bis 1944 [Mishandled Infantry - German infantry divisions in the Eastern European metropolitan area 1941 to 1944]. Verlag für Wehrwesen Bernard & Graefe, Frankfurt am Main, 1957.
- Verlassen von des Sieges Göttern – (Mißbrauchte Infanterie) [Forsaken by the Gods of Victory - (Mishandled Infantry)]. Kyffhäuser Verlag, Wiesbaden, 1969.

== Bibliography ==
- Dermot Bradley (Hrsg.): Soldatenschicksale des 20. Jahrhunderts, Band 5: Maximilian Fretter-Pico – Die Jahre danach: Erinnerungen des Generals der Artillerie a. D. 1945 bis 1984 [Soldier Fates of the 20th Century, Volume 5: Maximilian Fretter-Pico - The Years After: Memories of the General of the Artillery a. D. 1945 to 1984]. Biblio-Verlag, Osnabrück 1986, ISBN 3-7648-1464-0.
- Dermot Bradley: Die Generale des Heeres 1921 bis 1945, Band 4 [The Generals of the Army 1921 to 1945, Volume 4]. Biblio-Verlag, Bissendorf 1996, ISBN 3-7648-2488-3, S. 75 f.

Military offices
Preceded by General der Infanterie Sigismund von Förster	Commander of 97. Infanterie-Division; 15 April 1941 – 27 December 1941	Succeeded by Generalleutnant Ernst Rupp
Preceded by Generaloberst Hans von Salmuth	Commander of XXX. Armeekorps; 27 December 1941 – 4 July 1944	Succeeded by General der Kavallerie Philipp Kleffel
Preceded by General Maximilian de Angelis	Commander of 6. Armee; 17 July 1944 – 22 December 1944	Succeeded by General Hermann Balck
