= LXIV Army Corps =

- LXIV. Armeekorps
- Active: 24 September 1942 – 8 May 1945
- Disbanded: 8 May 1945
- Country: Nazi Germany

The LXIV Corps (German: LXIV. Armeekorps) was a corps-level command of the German Army on the Western Front during World War II.

== History ==
It was created on 24 September 1942, in Military Region (Wehrkreis) VIII as the LXIV Reserve Corps with the mission of supervising reserve divisions assigned to OB West, the German high command in the west. Activated on 5 August 1944 and renamed the LXIV Corps.

LXIV Corps was headquartered in the vicinity of Dijon from October 1942 until April 1944. During May and June 1944, the LXIV Corps Headquarters was located in northern France. In July 1944, the corps was sent to southwestern France near the Gironde Estuary. The following month, the LXIV corps had to retreat under difficult conditions to avoid being cut off by Allied units that had broken out of Normandy and other Allied forces that had invaded southern France.

By September 1944, LXIV Corps had established a line of defense in the Vosges Mountains as part of the German Nineteenth Army. The corps, however, was in a weak state, with its two assigned divisions only able to muster some 4,250 effectives. By late November 1944, Allied advances had forced the Nineteenth Army into an area around Colmar, nicknamed the Colmar Pocket. An offensive by French First Army and U.S. XXI Corps troops during January and February 1945 collapsed the Colmar Pocket, forcing the LXIV Corps to retreat across the Rhine River into Baden.

In April 1945, with the Allies across the Rhine as well, French forces thrust forward on April 18 and seized Tübingen, splitting the LXIV Corps into two parts. Attempts by the corps to reunite its elements failed in the face of Allied strength, and the commander of the corps at that time, General der Artillerie Max Grimmeiss, was found sheltering at a hospital in Konstanz and taken prisoner by the French army on April 26.

Remnants of the LXIV Corps fought alongside other equally tattered remnants of the Nineteenth Army in late April and early May until the unconditional surrender of Germany ended the war in Europe.

== Commanding officers ==
- General der Pioniere Karl Sachs, formation – 1 September 1944
- General der Infanterie Otto Lasch, 1 September 1944 – 1 November 1944
- General der Infanterie Helmut Thumm, 1 November 1944 – 15 January 1945
- Generalleutnant Friedrich-Wilhelm Hauck, 15 January 1945 – 21 January 1945
- General der Artillerie Maximilian Grimmeiß 21 January 1945 – 15 April 1945
- Generalleutnant Helmut Friebe, 15 April 1945 – April 1945 (deputy)
- General der Artillerie Rudolf Freiherr von Roman, April 1945 – German surrender
