= Albert Buck =

German general

- Born: 23 January 1895; Stuttgart
- Died: 6 September 1942 (aged 47); Novorossiysk, Soviet Union
- Military career
- Allegiance: German Empire; Weimar Republic; Nazi Germany
- Branch: German Army
- Service years: 1913–1920; 1935–1942
- Rank: Generalmajor
- Commands: 198th Infantry Division
- Conflicts: World War I; World War II; Battle of Denmark; Battle of France; Operation Barbarossa; Battle of Uman; Battle of Kiev (1941); Battle of Rostov (1941); Second Battle of Kharkov; Battle of the Caucasus (KIA)
- Awards: Knight's Cross of the Iron Cross

Albert Buck (23 January 1895 – 6 September 1942) was a German general during World War II. He was a recipient of the Knight's Cross of the Iron Cross of Nazi Germany.

Buck was born on 23 January 1895 in Stuttgart, Wurttemberg, in the German Empire. He served in the Reichswehr after 1913 and fought in World War I, gaining the Iron Cross (1st Class) and the Honour Cross of the World War, and during World War II he fought in the invasions of Denmark, France, and the Soviet Union. He became the Major-General in command of the German 198th Infantry Division during the war in the Soviet Union and served at Uman, Kiev, and Rostov, among other battles. He was killed at Novorossiysk on 6 September 1942 when several grenades exploded near his car.

== Awards and decorations ==
- Iron Cross (1939) 2nd Class (17 April 1940) & 1st Class (1 August 1940)
- Knight's Cross of the Iron Cross on 17 July 1941 as Oberst and commander of Grenadier-Regiment 305
- German Cross in Gold on 13 September 1942 as Generalmajor and commander of the 198. Infanterie-Division

Military offices
Preceded by General der Infanterie Otto Röttig	Commander of 198. Infanterie-Division; 10 April 1942 – 6 September 1942	Succeeded by General der Infanterie Ludwig Müller
