= Helmut Thumm =

German general

- Born: 25 August 1895; Ravensburg, Baden-Württemberg, German Empire
- Died: 13 July 1977 (aged 81); Welzheim, West Germany
- Military career
- Allegiance: German Empire; Weimar Republic; Nazi Germany
- Branch: German Army
- Service years: 1914–1945
- Rank: General der Infanterie
- Commands: LXIV Army Corps
- Conflicts: World War I World War II
- Awards: Knight's Cross of the Iron Cross with Oak Leaves

Helmut Thumm (25 August 1895 – 13 July 1977) was a German general during World War II. Thumm led German forces during the Allied offensive into the Colmar Pocket in January 1945. After pulling Hitler Youth teenagers out of the front lines against orders from above, he was relieved of his command of the LXIV Army Corps on 20 January 1945. He was arrested at his home in Welzheim, Germany, on 24 April 1945 by troops of the 44th Division. Thumm died in 1977 in Welzheim.

== Awards ==
- Iron Cross (1914) 2nd Class (26 August 1915) &1st Class (3 July 1918)
- Clasp to the Iron Cross (1939) 2nd Class (3 June 1940) & 1st Class (13 June 1940)
- Knight's Cross of the Iron Cross with Oak Leaves
  - Knight's Cross on 30 June 1941 as Oberstleutnant and commander of Infantry Regiment 56
  - 166th Oak Leaves on 23 December 1942 as Oberst and commander of Jäger Regiment 56

Military offices
Preceded by General der Infanterie Otto Lasch	Commander of LXIV. Armeekorps; 1 November 1944 – 15 January 1945	Succeeded by General der Artillerie Friedrich-Wilhelm Hauck
