= 198th Infantry Division (Wehrmacht) =

- 198. Infanterie-Division
- Division insignia
- Active: December 1939–May 1945
- Country: Nazi Germany
- Branch: Army
- Type: Infantry
- Size: Division
- Engagements: German invasion of Denmark; Battle of Greece; German-Soviet War; Operation Barbarossa; Battle of Rostov (1941); Case Blue; Battle of Rostov (1942); Winter campaign of 1941–42; Belgorod-Kharkov Offensive Operation; Battle of the Korsun–Cherkassy Pocket; Western Front; Operation Nordwind; Colmar Pocket

The 198th Infantry Division (German: 198. Infanterie-Division) was an infantry division of the German Heer during World War II.

Initially assembled in December 1939, the 198th Infantry Division participated in the German invasion of Denmark as well as the occupation of Copenhagen on 9 April 1940. The division was subsequently transferred in July 1940 to serve occupation duty in German-occupied France between July 1940 and March 1941. It was then sent to the German-aligned Kingdom of Romania and transferred through the German-friendly Kingdom of Bulgaria to participate in the German invasion of Greece in early April 1941. After the German victory in Greece, it was redeployed to Romania, from where it participated in the German invasion of the Soviet Union ("Operation Barbarossa") on 22 June 1941.

The 198th Infantry Division remained in combat on the Eastern Front against the forces of Soviet Union until early 1944. It participated in the First Battle of Rostov, Winter campaign of 1941/42, the German summer offensive of 1942 ("Case Blue"), the Second Battle of Rostov, defended against the Belgorod–Kharkov offensive operation and was eventually decisively battered in the Battle of the Korsun-Cherkassy Pocket, from which only remnants of the division escaped. The 198th Infantry Division was subsequently replenished and sent to the newly-formed Western Front after the Normandy landings in June 1944. Faced with advancing Western Allied armies, the division withdrew to the Upper Rhine sector by winter 1944/45 and participated in the failed attack against Strasbourg ("Operation Solstice", part of "Operation Northwind"). The offensive failed under heavy casualties, forcing the division back on the defensive. The majority of the division was crushed by the Western Allies in the Colmar Pocket in March 1945; a token leftover force escaped across the Rhine into southwestern Germany. The remnants of the 198th Infantry Division surrendered to US forces in Upper Bavaria near the end of the war.

== History ==
=== Homefront, 1939–1940 ===
The 198th Infantry Division was formed in the Prague-Plzeň area in the Protectorate of Bohemia and Moravia on 1 December 1939. Its initial personnel consisted of replacement formations staffed by recruits from Wehrkreis V. The two initial regiments of the 198th Infantry Division were the Infantry Regiments 305 and 308, with the former being assembled using personnel of the Infantry Replacement Regiments 5, 25, and 35, all part of the 155th Division, whereas the latter was assembled with manpower from the Infantry Replacement Regiments 78, 215, and 260, all part of the 165th Reserve Division. Additionally, the 198th Infantry Regiment was strengthened by the Light Artillery Detachment 235.

On 17 January 1940, the division was transformed into a full infantry division after the addition of the Landwehr Infantry Regiment 35, which was subsequently renamed Infantry Regiment 326. This regiment had previously been part of the 14th Landwehr Division. As a result, the 326th Regiment was primarily staffed by older soldiers, typically between ages 35 and 45. Furthermore, the Light Artillery Detachment 235 was strengthened with the staff as well as the 2nd Detachment of Artillery Regiment 223 from Wehrkreis IV. The resulting artillery formation was dubbed Artillery Regiment 235.

The initial divisional commander of the 198th Infantry Division, appointed on 10 January 1940, was Otto Röttig.

=== Denmark, 1940 ===
The 198th Infantry Division participated in the German invasion of Denmark and was present for the occupation of Copenhagen on 9 April 1940. One of its battalions, II./308, was brought into Copenhagen harbor by a German naval group ("Kriegsschiffgruppe 8"), consisting of German minelayer Hansestadt Danzig and German icebreaker Stettin, when Hansestadt Danzig steamed into Copenhagen harbor at 04:50 hours, minutes ahead of the German army's attack against the Danish border. II./308 subsequently seized Kastellet bastion without firing a shot before marching on Amalienborg palace, where a firefight broke out between the German infantrymen and the Danish Royal Life Guards. The skirmish was still ongoing when Luftwaffe flyovers of the city, and the connected threat of bombardment, ultimately convinced Christian X of Denmark to order a ceasefire and to proceed with a surrender to Germany.

Subsequently, the 2nd Battalion of Infantry Regiment 326 was deployed permanently in occupied Denmark to become Guard Battalion Copenhagen. A new infantry battalion was formed to take its place within the 326th Regiment on 28 May 1940.

=== France, 1940–1941 ===
The division was subsequently deployed to France, but only arrived there in July 1940, too late to take part in the Battle of France, which had concluded on 25 June. The division remained on occupation duty in France until March 1941.

On 1 September 1940, Artillery Regiment 235 was equipped with an additional three batteries, the former 4th, 5th, and 6th Batteries of Artillery Regiment 300, to a total of nine. Furthermore, Artillery Regiment 235 was equipped with heavy artillery from the 4th Detachment of Artillery Regiment 300. This heavy artillery subsequently became the 4th Artillery Detachment of Artillery Regiment 235.

On 30 October 1940, the 198th Infantry Division passed the staff of Infantry Regiment 326 as well as the 3rd Battalions of both Infantry Regiments 305 and 308 to the 327th Infantry Division, a new division of the 13th Aufstellungswelle, where the staff and two battalions would help form the Infantry Regiment 595.

=== Romania and Greece, 1941 ===
In March 1941, the 198th Infantry Division was ordered to Romania in preparation for the Battle of Greece. The division participated in the German invasion of Greece starting 5 April 1941. After the successful conclusion of that campaign, the 198th Infantry Division was put under supervision of Army Group South to participate in Operation Barbarossa.

=== Soviet Union, 1941–1944 ===
During Operation Barbarossa, the German invasion of the Soviet Union that started on 22 June 1941, the 198th Infantry Division secured a river crossing from within the German-allied Kingdom of Romania over the Prut river at Sculeni on the first day of fighting. On the following day (23 June 1941), the 198th Infantry Division and two allied Romanian divisions repulsed a swift Soviet counterattack aimed to recapture the Axis bridgehead. With the beginning of Operation München, the 198th Infantry Division initially fought west of the Dnieper, then took part in the attacks against Dnipropetrovsk. The city was captured by the 13th Panzer Division by 26 August 1941. On 14 August, the staff as well as the 2nd and 3rd Battalions of Infantry Regiment 326 were dissolved. These dissolutions had become necessary as a result of the large casualties that the division had sustained.

Subsequently, the division participated in the advance towards the Mius river, and the Battle of Rostov, during which the German advance was eventually temporarily repelled. During the winter battles of 1941 and 1942, the 198th Infantry Division fought along the Mius river. They would eventually be reassembled on 19 February 1943, using personnel from Wehrkreis IX and V.

On 10 April 1942, Röttig was replaced as divisional commander by Albert Buck. In the summer of 1942, the 198th Infantry Division participated in Case Blue and assisted in the Second Battle of Rostov. After the German victory at Rostov, the 198th Infantry Division fought in the Battle of the Caucasus between 1942 and 1943. Ludwig Müller was appointed as divisional commander, replacing Buck, who had been killed in action, on 6 September 1942. The 198th Infantry Division assisted the German capture of Novorossiysk after the Soviet landings in that region in February 1943. On 5 February 1943, Müller was replaced as divisional commander by Hans-Joachim von Horn.

Later in the year 1943, the 198th Infantry Division fought in the Izium area between June and July, and participated in the German resistance against the Soviet Belgorod-Kharkov Offensive Operation in August. As part of the German defeat at Kharkov, the 198th Infantry Division was heavily damaged and effectively reduced to Kampfgruppe strength.

On 11 September 1943, the 3rd Battalions of each of the 198th Infantry Division's former Infantry Regiments, now called Grenadier Regiments, were dissolved, leaving Grenadier Regiments 305, 308 and 326 with two battalions each. Further, the 198th Infantry Division was equipped with Fusilier Battalion 198 and with Artillery Regiment 235, the latter still equipped with all four of its detachments.

In February 1944, the 198th Infantry Division was encircled in the Korsun–Cherkassy Pocket. The division, already battered during the battles at Kharkov, managed to break out of the encirclement and escape, but suffered severe losses once again as it retreated to Romania. As a result, the division was taken out of the line in March 1944 and sent to Milovice in the Protectorate of Bohemia and Moravia for reinforcements.

=== Western Front, 1944–1945 ===
On 12 June 1944, in the immediate aftermath of the Allied Normandy landings, the 198th Infantry Division was using personnel of the Grenadier Regiment Bohemia within Shadow Division Bohemia, and sent to Narbonne in France to assist in the German defense against the Allied invasion. The division did so under the supervision of Otto Richter, who had been appointed to divisional command on 1 June 1944. Richter was replaced by Kurt Oppenländer on 1 August, who was in turn replaced by Alfred Kuhnert on 5 August, before Kuhnert eventually was replaced later that same month by Richter, who once again returned to his command post, but was then swapped out for Freiherr von Finck, an Oberstleutnant who had previously served as the division's general staff officer, on 28 August. Finck was in turn replaced by Otto Schiel on 3 September, who held the command post until January 1945.

The 198th Infantry Division once more suffered heavy casualties during its retreat to the Vosges mountains. After the German retreat from France, several minor formations were folded into the 198th Infantry Division during its defensive operations in the Upper Rhine area. These formations included two battalions from Grenadier Regiment O/V, the Fortress Infantry Battalion 1432, the Fortress Machine Gun Battalion 40, the 8th Kriegsmarine Ship Cadre Battalion, parts of the 2nd Battalion of the Security Regiment 200, the remnants of Battalion Mahnke and Battalion Märker, as well as several additional smaller units and disorganized groups of retreating soldiers.

In January 1945, the 198th Infantry Division took part in the attack of Army Group Upper Rhine against Strasbourg, dubbed "Operation Solstice" (part of "Operation Northwind"). This offensive failed and inflicted another round of heavy casualties on the division. By the end of January, the division was down to a strength of 6,800 men, about half of the planned manpower of an infantry division. On 18 January 1945, Schield was replaced as divisional commander by Konrad Barde.

In March 1945, large parts of the division were crushed in the Colmar Pocket. Parts of the formation did however manage to escape across the Rhine into Germany, where the remnants of the 198th Infantry Division continued to put up token resistance against the Western Allies. After retreating from the Neckar area, the division was taken prisoner by U.S. forces in Weilheim in Oberbayern. The last commander of the division, appointed on 26 April 1945, was Helmut Staedtke.

== Noteworthy individuals ==
Commanders

- Otto Röttig (10 January 1940 – 10 April 1942).
- Albert Buck (10 April 1942 – 6 September 1942). Killed in action on 6 September 1942.
- Ludwig Müller (6 September 1942 – 5 February 1943).
- Hans-Joachim von Horn (5 February 1943 – 1 June 1944).
- Otto Richter (1 June 1944 – 1 August 1944, after 5 August 1944 – 28 August 1944).
- Kurt Oppenländer (1 August 1944 – 5 August 1944).
- Alfred Kuhnert (appointed 5 August 1944, tenure ended before 28 August 1944).
- Freiherr von Finck (28 August 1944 – 3 September 1944), Generalstabsoffizier of the 198th Infantry Division (30 May 1944 – 30 September 1944).
- Otto Schiel (3 September 1944 – 18 January 1945).
- Konrad Barde (18 January 1945 – 26 April 1945).
- Helmut Staedtke (appointed 26 April 1945). Final divisional commander. Surrendered to the Americans at Weilheim.

Others

- Georg Grossjohann, soldier and later non-commissioned officer of the 198th Infantry Division who wrote a memoir about his experiences in World War II.
