= Wolf Ewert =

German General (1905–1994)

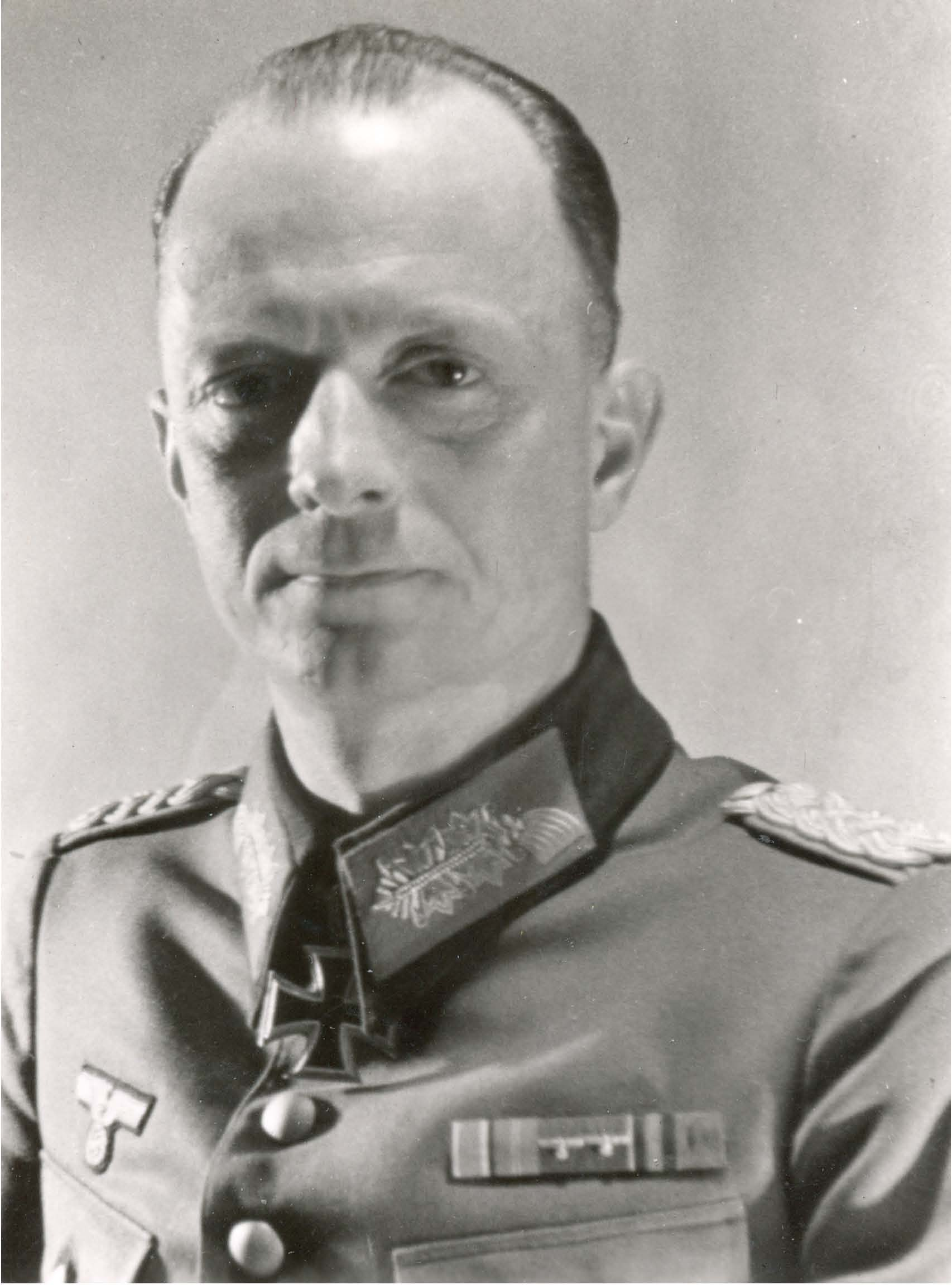
- Born: 31 July 1905
- Died: 16 March 1994 (aged 88)
- Military career
- Allegiance: Nazi Germany
- Branch: Army
- Rank: Generalmajor
- Commands: 716th Infantry Division; 338th Infantry Division
- Conflicts: World War II
- Awards: Knight's Cross of the Iron Cross

Wolf Ewert (31 July 1905 – 16 March 1994) was a German general in the Wehrmacht of Nazi Germany. He was a recipient of the Knight's Cross of the Iron Cross.

== Awards and decorations ==
- Knight's Cross of the Iron Cross on 18 July 1944 as Oberstleutnant and commander of Grenadier-Regiment 274

Military offices
Preceded by Generalmajor Ernst von Bauer	Commander of 716. Infanterie-Division; 30 December 1944 – 18 January 1945	Succeeded by None
Preceded by Generalmajor Konrad Barde	Commander of 338. Infanterie-Division; 18 January 1945 – 15 April 1945	Succeeded by None
