= 338th Infantry Division =

- German: 338. Infanterie-Division
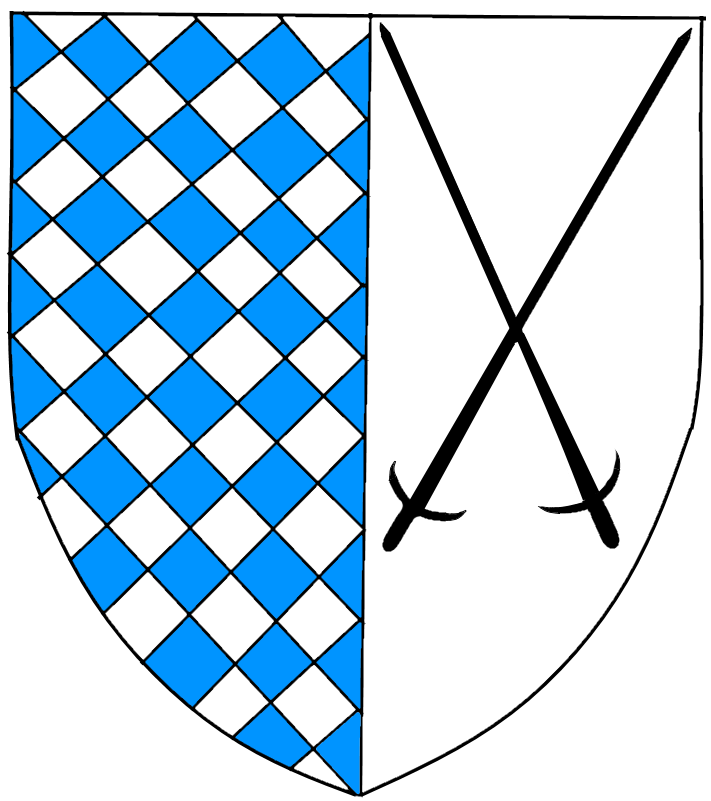
- 338. Infanterie Division Vehicle Insignia
- Active: 1944
- Country: Nazi Germany
- Branch: Army
- Type: Infantry
- Size: Division
- Engagements: World War II: Operation Dragoon

The 338th Infantry Division (German: 338. Infanterie-Division) was a division of the German Army in World War II.

In 1944, the division was in southern France, and fought against the Western Allies in Operation Dragoon.

== Order of Battle 1944 ==
- 757th Fortress Grenadier Regiment (two battalions)
- 758th Fortress Grenadier Regiment (two battalions)
- 759th Fortress Grenadier Regiment (two battalions)
- 338th Artillery Regiment (three battalions)
- 338th Panzerjäger Battalion
- 338th Reconnaissance Battalion
- 338th Pioneer Battalion
- 338th Signals Battalion

=== Commanders ===
The following commanders commanded the 338th Infantry Division:

- 10 Nov 1942 to 5 Jan 1944: Generalleutnant Josef Folttmann
- 5 Jan 1944 to 18 Sep 1944: Generalleutnant René de l'Homme de Courbière
- 18 Sep 1944 to Oct 1944: Generalmajor Hans Oschmann
- Oct 1944: Oberst Hafner
- Oct 1944 to 14 Nov 1944: Generalmajor Hans Oschmann
- 14 Nov 1944 to 29 Dec 1944: Colonel of Reserves Rudolf von Oppen
- 29 Dec 1944 to 18 Jan 1945: Oberst Konrad Barde
- 18 Jan 1945 to Apr 1945: Generalmajor Wolf Ewert

== Divisional Insignia ==
The divisional emblem is described as "A shield divided into two halves. The left half shows a blue and white diamond pattern design. The right half two black swords crossed on a white background."
