= Konrad Barde =

German Generalmajor

- Born: 13 November 1897; Stare Olesno, Lower Silesia
- Died: 4 May 1945 (aged 47); Traunstein, Bavaria
- Military career
- Allegiance: German Empire; Weimar Republic; Nazi Germany
- Branch: Prussian Army; German Army
- Service years: 1916–1920; 1935–1945
- Rank: Generalmajor
- Commands: 338th Infantry Division; 198th Infantry Division
- Conflicts: World War I; Battle of the Somme; Battle of Verdun; World War II; Occupation of Czechoslovakia; Invasion of Poland; Battle of France; Operation Barbarossa; Battles of Rzhev; Colmar Pocket; Western Allied invasion of Germany
- Awards: Iron Cross; The Honour Cross; Sudetenland Medal; German Cross; Eastern Medal; Knight's Cross of the Iron Cross

Konrad Barde (13 November 1897 – 4 May 1945) was a general in the Wehrmacht during World War II. He was a recipient of the Knight's Cross of the Iron Cross. Barde committed suicide on 4 May 1945.

== Awards and decorations ==
- Iron Cross (1914)
  - 2nd Class
  - 1st Class
- Iron Cross (1939)
  - 2nd Class
  - 1st Class
- German Cross in Gold on 26 December 1941 as Oberstleutnant in the IV./Artillerie-Regiment 104
- Knight's Cross of the Iron Cross on 5 January 1943 as Oberst and commander of Artillerie-Regiment 104

Military offices
Preceded by Generalmajor der Reserve Rudolf von Oppen	Commander of 338. Infanterie-Division; 29 December 1944 – 18 January 1945	Succeeded by Generalmajor Wolf Ewert
Preceded by Generalmajor Otto Schiel	Commander of 198. Infanterie-Division; 18 January 1945 – 4 May 1945	Succeeded by Generalleutnant Helmuth Städke
