= Friedrich-Wilhelm Otte =

German general and Knight's Cross recipient (1898–1944)

- Born: 22 September 1898
- Died: 8 May 1944 (aged 45); Sevastopol
- Military career
- Allegiance: Nazi Germany
- Branch: Army
- Rank: Generalmajor (Posthumously)
- Commands: 97th Jäger Division
- Conflicts: Crimean Offensive †
- Awards: Knight's Cross of the Iron Cross

Friedrich-Wilhelm Otte (22 September 1898 – 8 May 1944) was a German general in the Wehrmacht during World War II. He was a recipient of the Knight's Cross of the Iron Cross. Otte was killed on 8 May 1944 at Sevastopol during the Soviet Crimean Offensive.

== Awards and decorations ==
- Knight's Cross of the Iron Cross on 13 November 1942 as Oberst and commander of Jäger-Regiment 207

Military offices
Preceded by Generalleutnant Ernst Rupp	Commander of 97. Jäger-Division; 30 May 1943 – 3 June 1943	Succeeded by General der Infanterie Ludwig Müller
