= 272nd Infantry Division =

- German: 272. Infanterie-Division
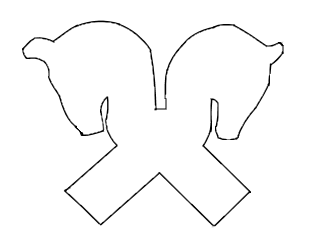
- Division insignia
- Active: December 1943 – September 1944
- Disbanded: Reformed into 272nd Volksgrenadier Division September 1944, disbanded April 1945.
- Country: Nazi Germany
- Branch: Army
- Type: Infantry
- Size: Division, 12,725 men total
- Engagements: Battle of Caen; Operation Atlantic; Operation Spring; Battle of Verrières Ridge; Retreat to the Seine

The 272nd Infantry Division was a Type 1944 Infantry division of the German Wehrmacht during World War II, that was originally formed in December 1943. The division fought in many of the major battles throughout Operation Overlord, culminating in the Retreat from Northern France and the Low Countries in late August/early September 1944.

== Unit origins ==
The 272nd Infantry Division was formed in Belgium beginning on 12 December 1943 from the remnants of the 216th Infantry Division, which had been decimated on the Eastern Front and disbanded the month before. The entire staff of the 216th, its signal battalion, divisional support units, and most of its artillery regiment were simply re-designated with the new divisional number. Grenadier Regiments 396 and 398 were disbanded, except the 2nd Battalion, Grenadier Regiment 396, which was re-designated as Füsilier Battalion 272. Its commander, Generalleutnant Friedrich August Schack, was carried over from his previous command of the 216th.

Only Grenadier Regiment 348, under the command of Oberstleutnant Burian, was withdrawn from Russia in its entirety, to be re-designated as Grenadier Regiment 980. Both Grenadier Regiments 981 and 982 were created from reserve and training battalions of the 182nd Reserve Division, consisting almost entirely of native German personnel or Reichsdeutsche. The combat engineer and antitank battalions were formed from scratch using elements forwarded from the Replacement Army.

The 272nd Infantry Division trained in the Bevern area in Belgium while under the command and control of the Fifteenth Army. In April 1944 it was sent to the French Mediterranean Coast to continue its training plan and to conduct security duties near the Franco-Spanish border while under the control of the Nineteenth Army. By 19 June, it reported that its present for duty strength was 11,211 men and 1,514 Russian auxiliaries or Hiwis, for a total of 12,725 men, close to its authorized strength. For information about its commitment to the defensive front in Normandy and its main engagements, refer to the section shown below.

After surviving the retreat from Normandy, on 17 September 1944 it was redesignated as the 272nd Volksgrenadier Division.

== Divisional organization ==
Upon its formation in December 1943, the 272nd Infantry Division was composed of the following regiments & formations.

Division headquarters and staff company 272
Grenadier Regiment 980 (Oberst Ewald Burian)
Grenadier Regiment 981 (Major Edwin Bodsch)
Grenadier Regiment 982 (Oberstleutnant Paul Roesener)
Füsilier Battalion 272 (Major Gerhard Thuermer)

Artillerie-Regiment 272 (Oberstleutnant August Wilbrandt)
Panzerjäger-Abteilung 272 (Hauptmann Friedrich Adrario)
Pionier Battalion 272 (Hauptmann Hassinger)
Nachrichten Battalion 272 (Major Schossig)
Divisions-Nachschubführer 272 (Major Ritter)
Feld-Ersatz Battalion 272 (Major Schuetz)

== Division commanders ==
Generalleutnant Friedrich August Schack (15 Dec 1943 to 3 Sep 1944)

Ia (Operations Officer): Oberstleutnant i.G. Hubert Werner

== The 272nd Infantry Division during the Battle of Caen, July – August 1944 ==
On 25 July 1944, after a preliminary barrage lasting upwards of five hours, forces of the II Canadian Corps initiated a massive offensive across a 7 km front, stretching from the Orne River to Bourguebus Ridge, along the entire northern slope of Verrières Ridge. Although initial successes were made by Canadian forces, strong adherence to defensive doctrine by German forces across the ridge prevented major gains. The ridge's defenders, including the 272nd Division, inflicted particularly heavy casualties on the Black Watch (Royal Highland Regiment) of Canada with 315 out of the 325 men who left the Canadian start line killed, wounded, or captured.

Counterattacks were carried out throughout the 25 and 26 July by Heer and Waffen SS troops and tanks, so that by the evening of 26 July, the tip of the Anglo-Canadian spearhead had been broken off and the front line pushed back between two and three kilometers. The next evening, the exhausted survivors of the 272nd were pulled out of line and sent to a quiet area on the front line near the town of Troarn to rest, reconstitute and take in replacements. It continued to reorganize until 3 August, absorbing the bulk of the disbanded 16th Luftwaffe Field Division. This brought the 272nd back up to 50–60% of its authorized strength. By being transferred to the Troarn area, the division avoided being trapped in the Falaise Pocket. Though it had fought hard during the effort to stop Operation Goodwood, much more lay ahead – fighting at Troan, retreat across the Dives, the tank battle at Lisieux, and the retreat across the Seine and the low countries.

The Grenadiers of the 272nd had acquitted themselves well against British tanks, using Panzerfaust, hand grenade bundles and antitank guns to make numerous tank kills in ten days of combat while undergoing some of the fiercest bombardments of the Normandy Campaign.
