= 552nd Division =

552nd Division may refer to:

- 552nd Grenadier Division, Wehrmacht, Germany
- 552nd Airborne Warning and Control Division, United States

== See also ==
- List of military divisions by number
