= Colmar Pocket =

WWII German-held area in France

The Colmar Pocket
- Part of World War II
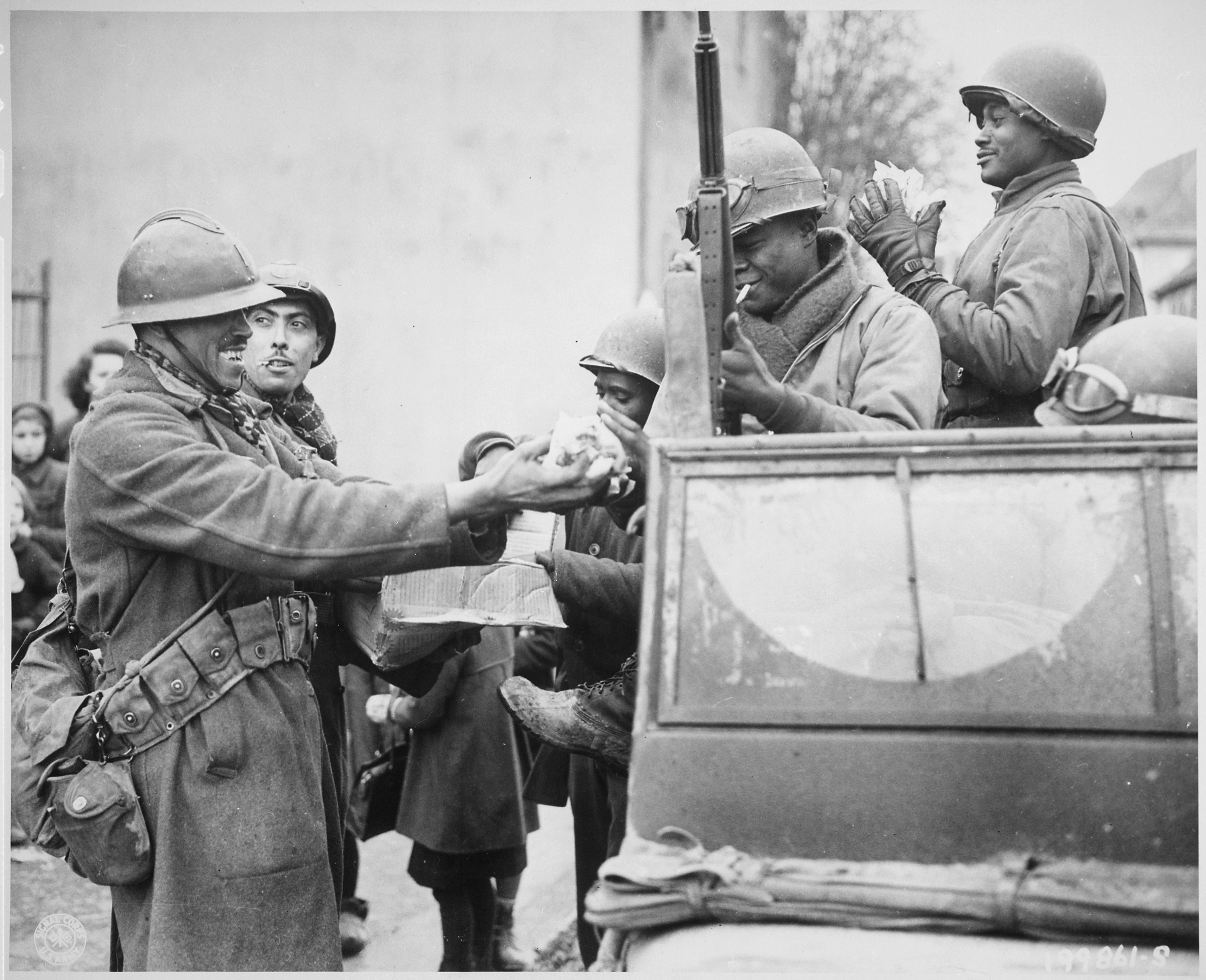
- U.S. and French Moroccan troops link up at Rouffach, February 1945. The junction of the two forces split the Colmar Pocket.
Date	20 January – 9 February 1945
Location	Around Colmar, Alsace 48°4′50″N 7°21′36″E
Result	Allied victory

Belligerents
France; United States	Germany

Commanders and leaders
Jacob L. Devers; Jean d.L. de Tassigny; Antoine Béthouart; J d.G. de Monsabert	Paul Hausser; Siegfried Rasp; Max Grimmeiss; Erich Abraham

Units involved
1st Army; I Corps; II Corps; XXI Corps	19th Army; LXIII Corps; LXIV Corps

Strength
420,000 troops	c. 50,000 troops c. 130 AFVs

Casualties and losses
France: 13,390; United States: 8,000	22,000—38,500 men 70 AFVs

The Colmar Pocket (French: Poche de Colmar; German: Brückenkopf Elsass) was the area held in central Alsace, France, by the German Nineteenth Army from November 1944 to February 1945, against the U.S. 6th Army Group (6th AG) during World War II. It was formed when 6th AG liberated southern and northern Alsace and adjacent eastern Lorraine, but could not clear central Alsace. During Operation Nordwind in December 1944, the 19th Army attacked north out of the Pocket in support of other German forces attacking south from the Saar into northern Alsace. In late January and early February 1945, the French First Army (reinforced by the U.S. XXI Corps) cleared the Pocket of German forces.

== Background ==
=== Formation of the Pocket ===
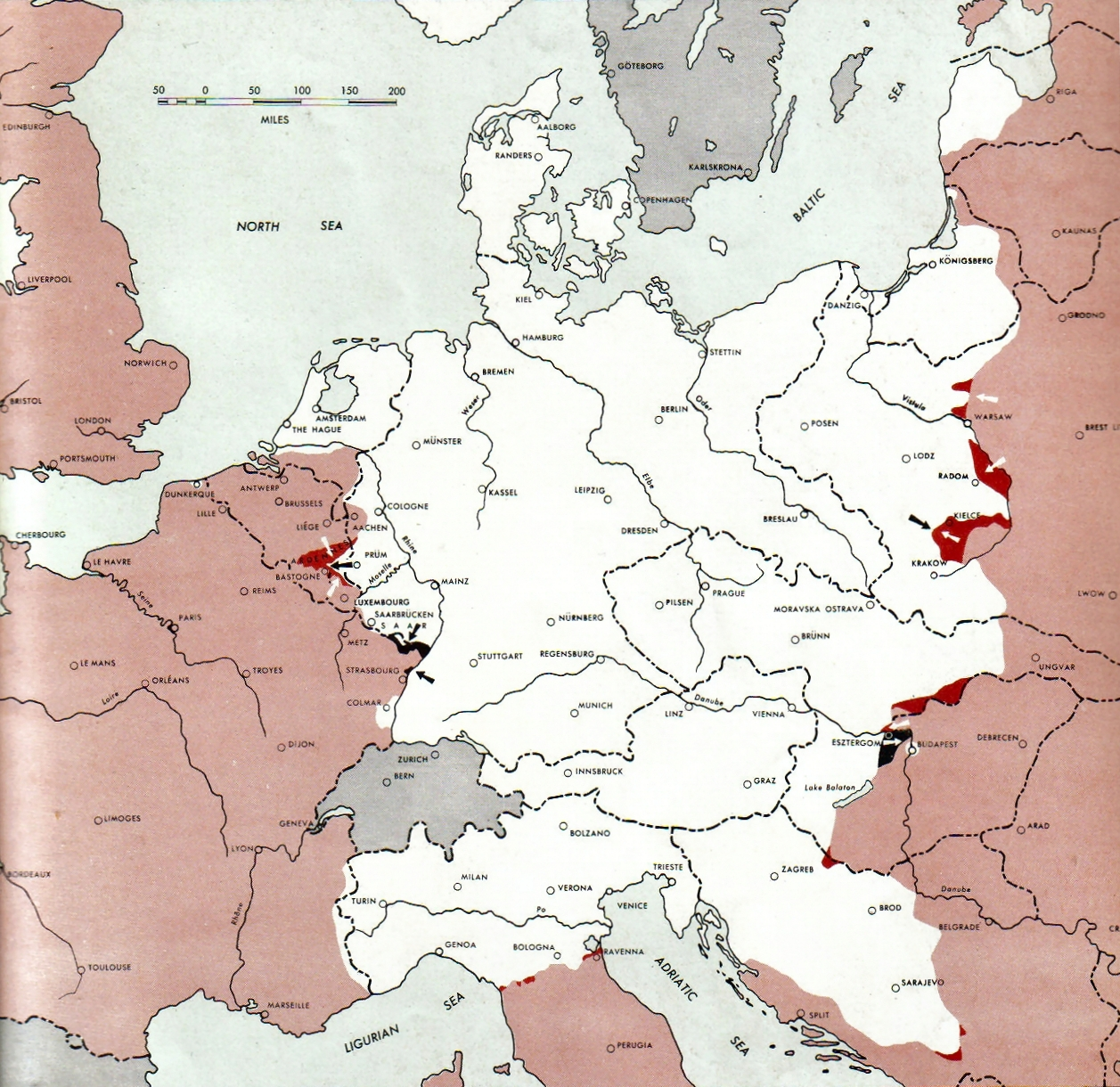
War situation on 15 January 1945; the German bridgehead in the vicinity of Colmar is clearly visible on the map.

A German bridgehead on the west bank of the Rhine 65 kilometres (40 mi) long and 50 kilometres (30 mi) deep was isolated in November 1944 when the German defenses in the Vosges Mountains collapsed under the pressure of an offensive by the U.S. 6th Army Group. General Jean de Lattre de Tassigny's French First Army forced the Belfort Gap and destroyed the German IV Luftwaffe Field Corps near the town of Burnhaupt in the southern Vosges Mountains. Soon afterwards, French forces reached the Rhine in the region north of the Swiss border between Mulhouse and Basel. Likewise, in the northern Vosges Mountains, the French 2nd Armored Division spearheaded a U.S. Seventh Army advance, forced the Saverne Gap, and drove to the Rhine, liberating Strasbourg on 23 November 1944. The effect of these two advances was to collapse the German presence in southern Alsace west of the Rhine to a semi-circular bridgehead centered on the town of Colmar that came to be known as the "Colmar Pocket".

=== German view ===
Apart from Normandy, the areas of France most bitterly defended by the Germans were Alsace and Lorraine. This occurred in part because the Allied surge across France in 1944 was slowed down by logistical difficulties as the Allies reached the easternmost extent of France, but the primary reason for the stout German defenses of these regions is that Alsace and Lorraine were claimed as part of Germany and would be defended as strongly as any other German soil. This perception informed Hitler's decisions of 24 November and 27 November 1944, that committed General Siegfried Rasp's 19th Army to a do-or-die defense of the region around Colmar. On 26 November, the Germans formed Army Group Oberrhein under the command of Heinrich Himmler and tasked his command with the defense of the front between the Bienwald and the Swiss border. Of prime importance to the German defense around Colmar were the bridges over the Rhine at Breisach and Chalampé, since it was over these bridges that supplies were delivered.

Forces, 20 January 1945
German

Nineteenth Army
(General der Infanterie Siegfried Rasp)

- 2nd Mountain Division
- 106th Panzer Brigade
- LXIV Corps (Generalleutnant Max Grimmeiss)
  - 198th Infantry Division
  - 189th Infantry Division
  - 708th Volksgrenadier Division
  - 16th Volksgrenadier Division
- LXIII Corps (Generalleutnant Erich Abraham)
  - 338th Infantry Division
  - 159th Infantry Division
  - 716th Infantry Division
Allied

French First Army
(Général d'armée Jean de Lattre de Tassigny)

- 10th Infantry Division
- French I Corps (Général de corps d'armée Antoine Béthouart)
  - 4th Moroccan Mountain Division
  - 2nd Moroccan Infantry Division
  - 9th Colonial Infantry Division
  - 1st Armored Division
- French II Corps (Général de corps d'armée Joseph de Goislard de Monsabert)
  - 3rd Algerian Infantry Division
  - 1st Infantry Division
  - 2nd Armored Division
  - 5th Armored Division
  - 3rd U.S. Infantry Division
  - 28th U.S. Infantry Division
  - 44th U.S. Infantry Division, Company E, 1st Bn

=== Allied limitations ===
The logistical crisis and heavy combat of autumn 1944 had dulled the fighting edge of Allied forces throughout northwestern Europe. Restricted logistical support imposed limits on the usage of artillery ammunition and the number of divisions the Allies could effectively employ in the front lines. Faulty forecasts for the numbers of infantry replacements needed prevented U.S. rifle companies from maintaining full strength.

On the part of the French, their replacement system was limited by the amount of training infrastructure they had been able to re-establish since reentering France in August 1944 and was further strained by a controversial French decision to "whiten" the French forces in Alsace by sending experienced Senegalese and other colonial troops—exhausted from fighting in Italy—to the south and replacing them with French Forces of the Interior (FFI) troops of varying quality and experience. While the FFI troops were capable of defensive operations, they had to undergo a steep learning curve in order to become effective at offensive operations, particularly where complex activities such as combined-arms operations were concerned.

At the close of November 1944, the French First Army deployed two kinds of units—highly experienced colonial units and "green" units that had recently received a large influx of FFI troops. Coupled with a supporting arms structure (artillery, engineers, etc.) that was weaker than that of other Allied field armies, the sag in French First Army troop proficiency allowed the Germans to hold the Colmar Pocket against an unsuccessful French offensive from 15–22 December 1944.

=== Allied force redeployments ===
On New Year's Day 1945, the Germans launched Unternehmen Nordwind (Operation "North Wind"), one objective of which was the recapture of Strasbourg. German troops of the 198th Infantry Division and the 106th Panzer Brigade attacked north out of the Colmar Pocket from 7–13 January. Although the defending French II Corps suffered some minor losses during this attack, the French held the front south of Strasbourg and frustrated German attempts to recapture the city. (Note: The German name for this attack was Sonnenwende ("solstice").) Following the failure of Nordwind, 6th Army Group was ordered to collapse the Colmar Pocket as part of General Dwight D. Eisenhower's plan for all Allied forces to close on the Rhine prior to invading Germany. Since the bulk of Allied troops surrounding the Colmar Pocket were French, this mission was assigned to the French First Army.

The U.S. 3rd Infantry Division had moved into the Vosges Mountains during mid-December to replace the worn-out U.S. 36th Infantry Division and so was already in place to support the reduction of the Colmar Pocket. Realizing the French would need the assistance of additional U.S. troops for the coming battle, General Jacob Devers, commander of 6th Army Group, arranged for the transfer of a U.S. division from another part of the front. The U.S. 28th Infantry Division duly arrived from the Ardennes front and took up position along the right flank of the U.S. 3rd Infantry Division. With the 28th Division in the Kaysersberg Valley, the 3rd Division would be able to concentrate for an attack against two German divisions, the 708th (a Volksgrenadier division) and the 189th Infantry. Additionally, a U.S. armored division, the 10th, was scheduled to support the offensive, but as events developed, it was the U.S. 12th Armored Division that was eventually committed to the battle.

=== Weather and terrain ===
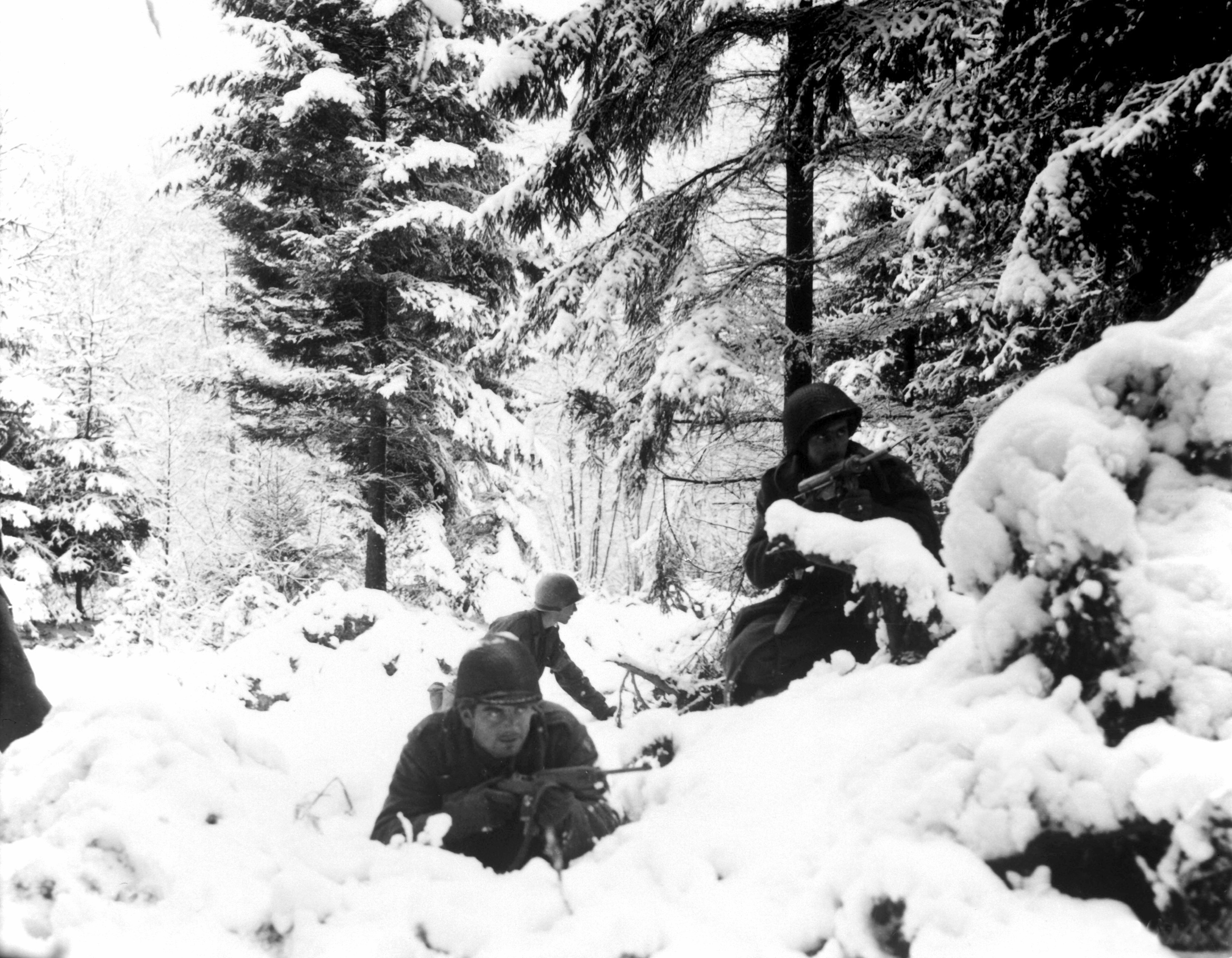
Winter in northwestern Europe, 1945: conditions on the Ardennes front.

The winter of 1944–45 was uncommonly cold for northwestern Europe. In his History of the French First Army, General de Lattre described the weather in Alsace as "Siberian" with temperatures of -20 °C (-4 °F), strong winds, and over three feet (1 m) of snow.

The Alsatian Plain is flat and offers an attacker practically no cover other than occasional woods. The plain is also a drainage basin for the Rhine and is consequently cut by many streams and drainage canals with alluvium-coated bottoms, making them treacherous for vehicles to ford. Dotting the plain are small villages made up of sturdy masonry houses whose multi-storey construction offered defending troops a commanding view of the surrounding fields.

== Battle ==
=== Initial French attack against the south flank of the Colmar Pocket ===
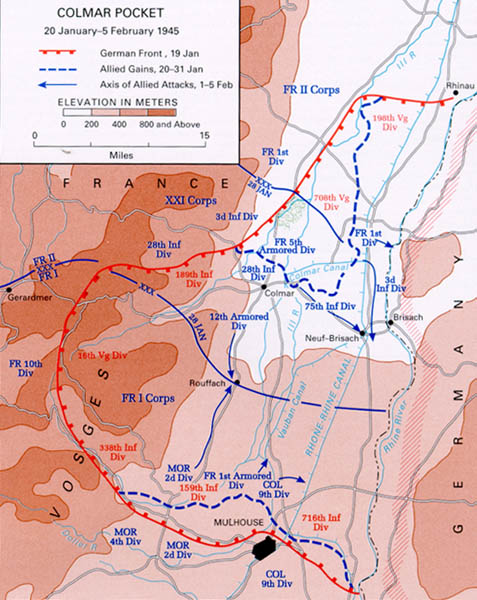
Unit locations and movements

General Émile Béthouart's French I Corps (French: I^{er} Corps d'Armée) attacked on 20 January 1945. The 2nd and 4th Moroccan Divisions had as their initial objective Ensisheim (47°51′59″N 07°21′11″E). The 9th Colonial Division conducted secondary attacks on the right flank of the corps, north of Mulhouse. In support were tanks of the French 1st Armored Division. Attacking in a snowstorm, the French I Corps initially achieved tactical surprise against its opponent, General Erich Abraham's LXIII. Armeekorps. The attack of the French I Corps slowed through the night as German counterattacks began. The difficult weather and terrain coupled with a German defense in depth stymied the French I Corps advance and severely limited its success. The French attack, however, succeeded in drawing German mobile reserves (the 106th Panzer Brigade and the 654th Heavy Antitank Battalion) and the German 2nd Mountain Division south. However, even this limited success was not without significant cost: one brigade of the French 1st Armored Division, Combat Command 1 (CC1), lost 36 of some 50 medium tanks to land mines. Losses in other tank units were similar.

Unlike most of the terrain on the Alsatian Plain, the terrain the French I Corps fought in was hemmed in by woodlands and urban areas, and so ground was won only slowly in January after the first day of the attack. The 4th Moroccan Mountain Division was able to push only some two miles (3 km) to the northeast in the direction of Cernay (47°48′36″N 07°10′37.2″E). On the 4th Division's right flank and to the southeast, the 2nd Moroccan Infantry Division enjoyed greater success, pushing almost four miles (6 km) to the northeast in the direction of Wittelsheim (47°48′00″N 07°14′06″E). On the right flank and starting from the city of Mulhouse, the 9th Colonial Division also pushed 3–4 miles (5–6 km) through the suburbs of Mulhouse and the woods north of the city, with CC1 taking Richwiller (47°46′48″N 07°16′55.2″E) and the 6th Colonial Infantry Regiment liberating Wittenheim (47°48′18″N 07°20′16.8″E). On 24 January, a German armored counterattack near Richwiller was repulsed by the French colonial troops, with the Germans losing 15 tanks and tank destroyers. Overall, the gains of the French I Corps were greater in the western part (right flank) of its sector of the front, but the Germans in large part succeeded in stalemating the corps' advance.

=== Allied attack in the north ===
General Joseph de Goislard de Monsabert's II ^{e} Corps d'Armée launched its attack on 22–23 January. The attacking units were the U.S. 3rd Infantry Division and the French 1st Infantry Marching Division. South of the 3rd Division, the U.S. 28th Infantry Division defended its sector of the front. In reserve was the French 2nd Armored Division.

==== Push to the Colmar Canal and the battle for Jebsheim ====
General John W. O'Daniel's 3rd U.S. Infantry Division attacked to the southeast on 22 January, aiming to cross the Ill River, bypass the city of Colmar to the north, and open a path for the tanks of the French 5th Armored Division to drive on the railway bridge supplying the Germans in the Colmar Pocket at Neuf-Brisach.

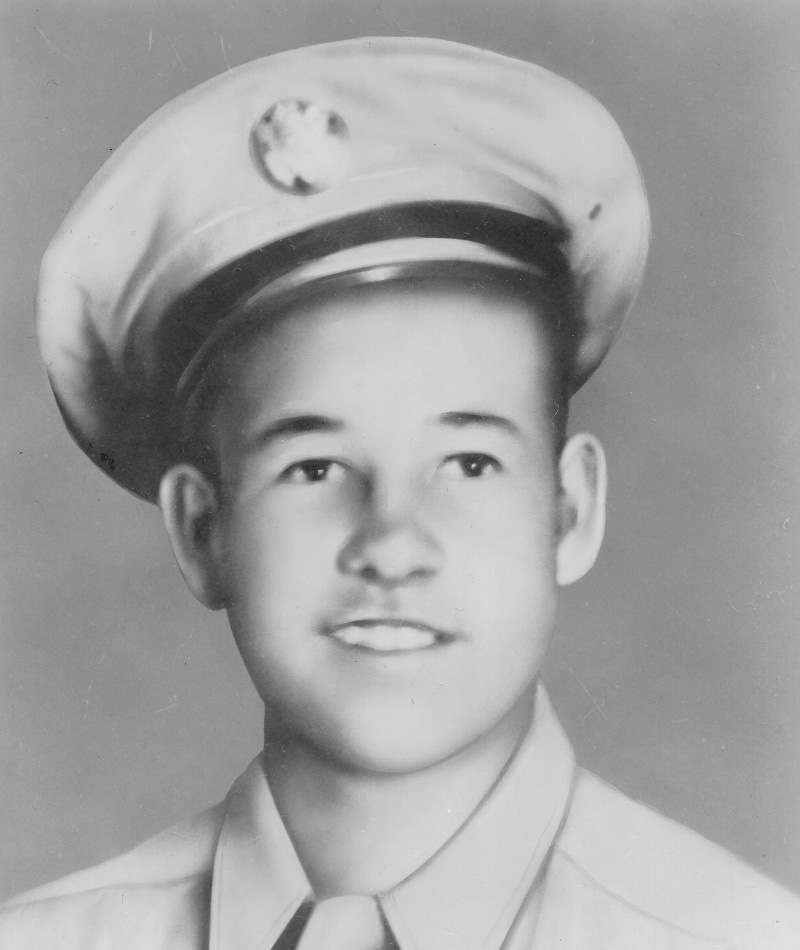
PFC Jose F. Valdez, posthumously awarded the Medal of Honor for his heroism while serving with the U.S. 7th Infantry on 25 January 1945.

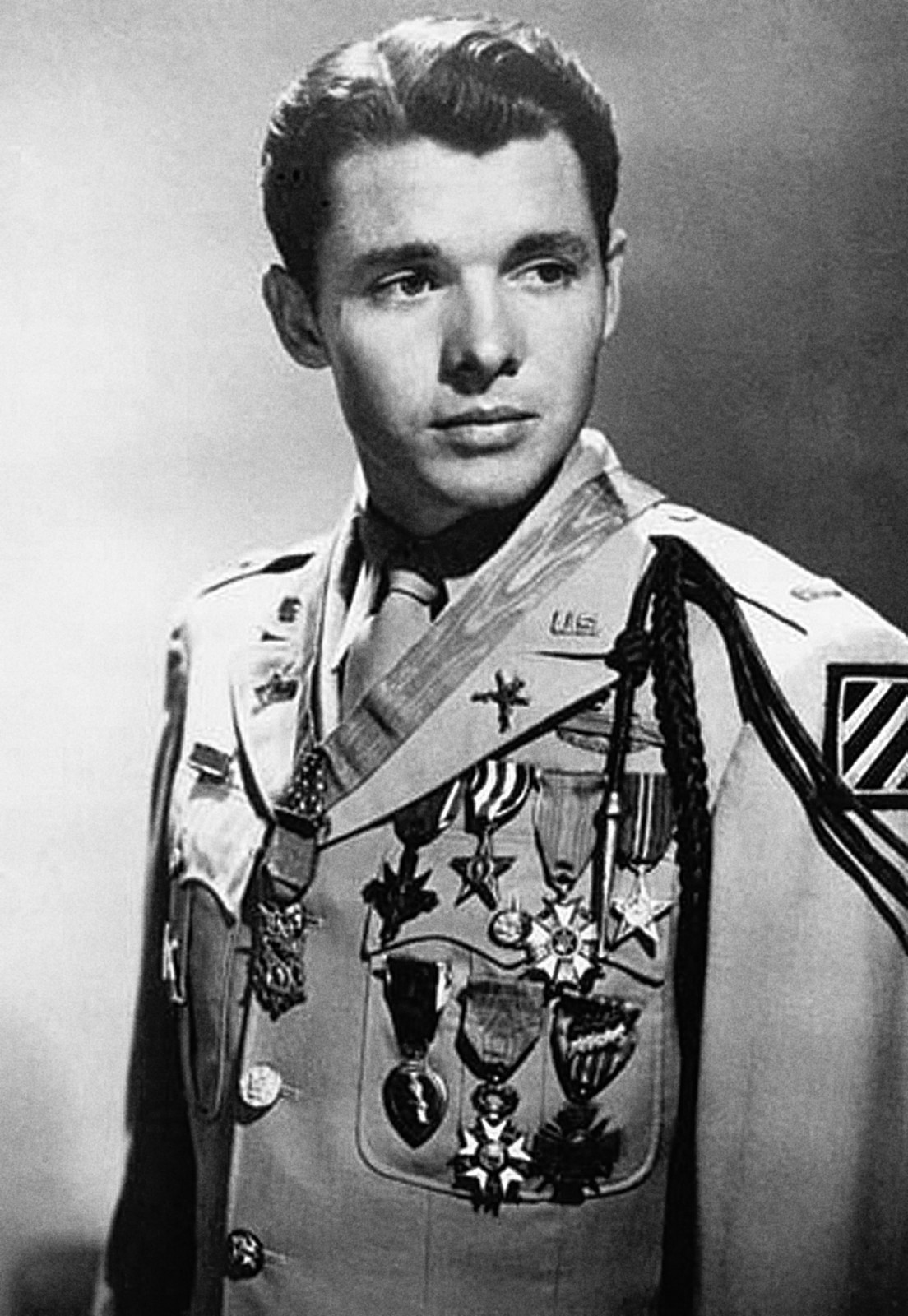
Audie Murphy, highly decorated 3rd Infantry Division officer who was awarded the Medal of Honor for his heroism during the fighting in the Bois de Riedwihr.

The division's 7th Infantry Regiment pushed to the south, clearing the region between the Fecht and Ill Rivers. During the clearing operations of the 7th Infantry, Private First Class Jose F. Valdez sacrificed himself at a small railway station near Rosenkranz (48°07′49.22″N 07°21′22.32″E) to cover the withdrawal of other members of his squad and was posthumously awarded the Medal of Honor. The 30th Infantry Regiment moved southeast, crossed the Ill River north of the timber bridge at the Maison Rouge farm, and moved south early on 23 January, capturing the Maison Rouge bridge (48°09′03.6″N 07°25′22.8″E). The 30th Infantry then moved south into the Riedwihr Woods (French: Bois de Riedwihr), toward the towns of Riedwihr (48°07′26.4″N 07°26′42″E) and Holtzwihr (48°06′36″N 07°25′30″E).

Site of the bridge at Maison Rouge, 2011.

The bridge at Maison Rouge proved unable to support U.S. tanks (the bridge collapsed under the weight of a tank), and so the 30th Infantry had only minimal antitank capability (bazookas and three 57 mm anti-tank guns) when they were counter-attacked late in the afternoon by German infantry and heavy tank destroyers of the 708th Volksgrenadier Division and 280th Assault Gun Battalion. Without cover and unable to dig foxholes because of the frozen terrain, the 30th Infantry was forced to withdraw, taking heavy casualties when the withdrawal assumed the character of a rout. The 30th Infantry reformed on the west bank of the Ill but was out of action for three days while it reorganized.

On 25 January, the U.S. 15th Infantry Regiment followed the course of the 30th Infantry and recaptured the bridge at Maison Rouge. A German counterattack, again supported by heavy tank destroyers, overran an exposed rifle company of the 15th Infantry around 08:00 but was unable to drive on the bridge because of U.S. defensive fire. Later in the day, U.S. engineers erected a bridge over the Ill north of Maison Rouge, and a battalion of the 15th Infantry supported by tanks attacked to the south, finally securing the bridgehead. Over the next two days, the 15th Infantry pushed south toward the towns of Riedwihr and Holtzwihr, entering the Riedwihr Woods. German counterattacks were common, but the U.S. troops were able to parry them with support from tanks and tank destroyers.

On 26 January, on the south edge of the Riedwihr Woods, a German force of infantry and tanks emerged from Holtzwihr to counterattack Company B of the 15th Infantry. Believing the odds hopeless, Lieutenant Audie Murphy ordered his men to withdraw into the woods. Murphy climbed onto a burning M10 tank destroyer and engaged the Germans with the vehicle's heavy machine gun while calling for artillery fire on his own position. Unable to determine where Murphy was firing from, the German force first became confused and then was bombed by U.S. fighter-bombers that had found a hole in the clouds over the battlefield. Dismayed, the German force retreated back to Holtzwihr, pursued by Murphy. He was subsequently awarded the Medal of Honor. Riedwihr fell to the 15th Infantry on 26 January, and Holtzwihr was taken by the 30th Infantry on 27 January. The 30th Infantry continued south, reaching the Colmar Canal on 29 January.

The capture of Jebsheim (48°07′33″N 07°28′40″E) was necessary to protect the north flank of the 3rd Division's advance. With the 3rd Division advancing ahead of the French 1st Infantry Marching Division on the 3rd Division's north flank, O'Daniel committed the U.S. 254th Infantry Regiment (part of the 63rd Infantry Division but attached to the U.S. 3rd Infantry Division for the duration of operations in the Colmar Pocket) to capture Jebsheim. On 26–27 January, troops of the German 136th Mountain Infantry Regiment defended Jebsheim against the advance of the 254th Infantry. On 28–29 January, Jebsheim was taken by the 254th Infantry, French tanks of Combat Command 6 (French 5th Armored Division), and a battalion of the French 1st Parachute Regiment. Subsequently, the 254th Infantry continued to push east in the direction of the Rhône-Rhine Canal. Meanwhile, the 7th Infantry had moved forward, and along with the 15th Infantry Regiment and French 5th Armored Division tanks, were positioned to drive on the fortified town of Neuf-Brisach, about 5 miles (8.0 km) distant from the 3rd Division spearheads.

==== Push to the Rhine in the north ====
On the left flank and north of the U.S. 3rd Division, General Garbay's French 1st Infantry Marching Division attacked to the east on 23 January with the Rhine River as their objective. Facing four battalions of the 708th Volksgrenadier Division (part of General Max Grimmeiss' LXIV Army Corps) supported by heavy tank destroyers and artillery, the 1st Division's 1st Brigade fought in conditions similar to that experienced by the Americans to the south. The Germans mounted a defense in depth, using positions in the villages and forests to command the open ground to their front and liberally planting land mines to slow and channelize the French advance. Two battalions of the 708th Volksgrenadier Division counterattacked the French bridgeheads over the Ill River around 17:00 on 23 January but were repulsed. Wishing to avoid dug-in German infantry and armor in the Elsenheim Woods (Note: 48°10′30″N 07°27′36″E), Garbay directed the 1st Brigade to concentrate their advance along the road from Illhaeusern (Note: 48°10′58″N 07°26′13″E) to Elsenheim. On 26–27 January, the 1st Brigade concentrated on opening this route and skirting the obstacle posed by the Elsenheim Woods, with a key attack into the woods made by the 3rd Battalion of the Marching Regiment of the French Foreign Legion (R.M.L.E.) on 27 January. At heavy cost, the village of Grussenheim (Note: 48°08′42″N 07°29′06″E) was taken on 28 January by supporting tanks of the French 2nd Armored Division. Against crumbling German resistance, the French surged forward, taking Elsenheim and Marckolsheim (Note: 48°09′53″N 07°32′42″E) on 31 January and reaching the Rhine River the following day. In the course of its operations in the Colmar Pocket, the French 1st Division suffered casualties of 220 killed, 1,240 wounded, 96 missing and 550 cases of trench foot.

=== Allied reinforcements ===
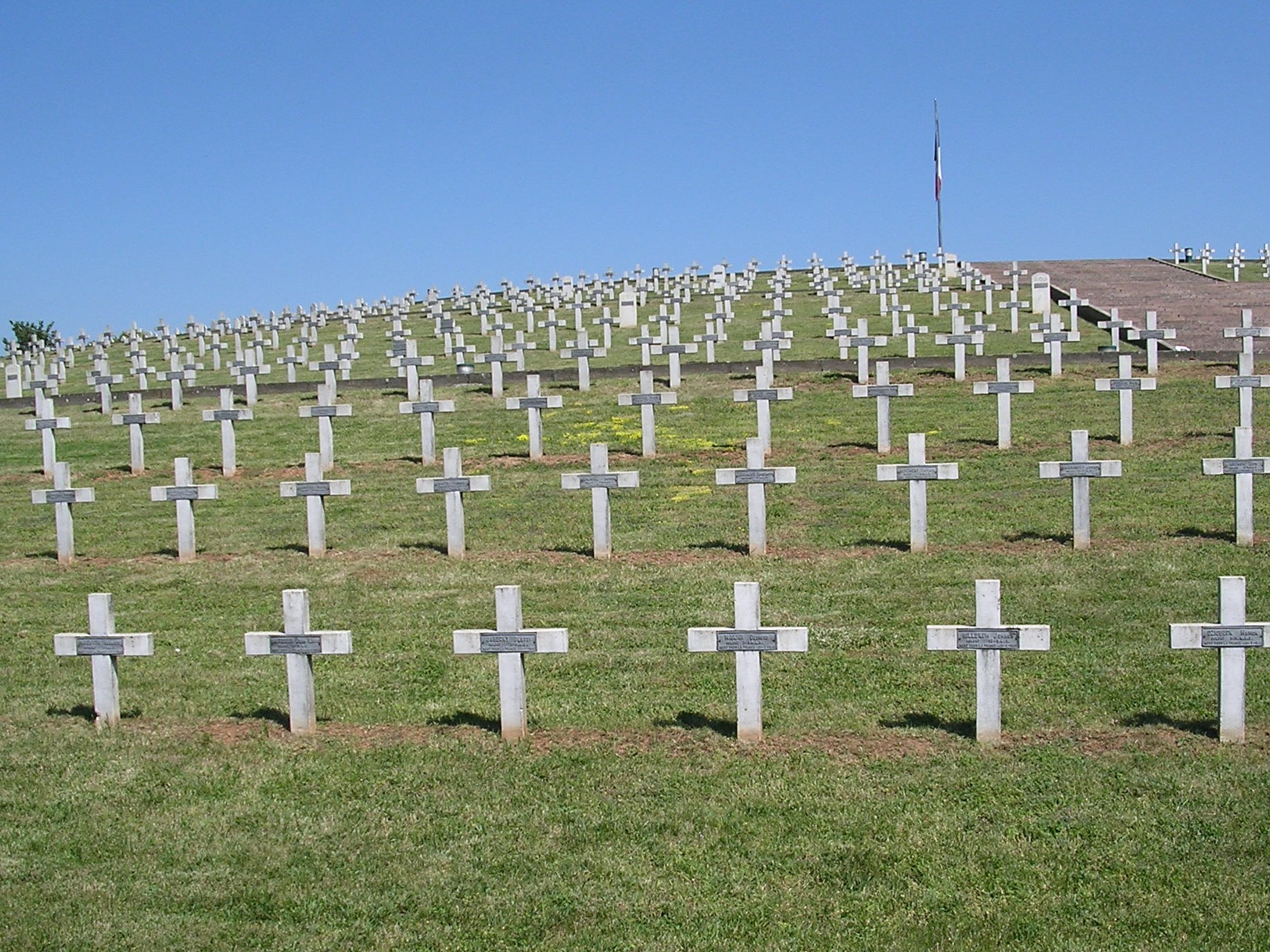
French military cemetery at Sigolsheim

Noting the difficult progress of all Allied units against German resistance in the Colmar Pocket, de Lattre requested reinforcements from the U.S. 6th Army Group. Concurring, Devers subordinated the Headquarters of the U.S. XXI Corps to the French First Army. General Milburn's XXI Corps took up position between the two French corps on 28 January and assumed command of the U.S. 3rd and 28th Infantry Divisions. Two additional U.S. divisions were also assigned to the XXI Corps - the U.S. 75th Infantry Division and the U.S. 12th Armored Division. Finally, the French 5th Armored Division, 1st Parachute Regiment, and 1st Choc (commando) Battalion were placed under XXI Corps' command. The XXI Corps was given the mission of capturing the city of Colmar and driving on the bridge at Breisach.

For their part, the German high command misread the Allied objectives, believing the Allied assault to be a general pressure along the front designed to induce collapse at any given point. Hitler had agreed to a partial withdrawal in the north (the Erstein salient) during the night of 28 January, but forbade a general withdrawal over the Rhine. German outposts in the Vosges Mountains were pulled back, but the confusion of the withdrawal and the pressures of the battlefield resulted in many units becoming mixed with one another. While this did not affect the numbers available for combat, it did lower the defensive cohesion of the German units. On 29 January, Heeresgruppe Oberrhein was dissolved as a headquarters, and the units in the Colmar Pocket were again subordinated to Heeresgruppe G (Army Group G), under the command of SS-Obergruppenführer Paul Hausser.

==== Push to the Rhine in the center ====
The 3rd Division continued its south and east sidestepping maneuver. On the evening of 29 January, divisional artillery fired 16,000 105 mm and 155 mm rounds during a three-hour preparation for the assault of the 7th and 15th Infantry Regiments south across the Colmar Canal. The infantry crossed between 21:00 and midnight. After the crossings were secured, engineers began the construction of three Bailey bridges over the canal to enable armored vehicles to cross. The following day, the French armored combat commands CC4 and CC5 (both of the 5th Armored Division) crossed the canal, with CC4 supporting the U.S. 7th Infantry and CC5 supporting the U.S. 15th Infantry. Soon thereafter, the 15th Infantry and CC5 took Urschenheim in a brisk action, while the 7th Infantry was held up in front of Horbourg. The same day, the 254th Infantry attacked east toward Artzenheim with support of the French armored combat command CC6, but the Germans employed artillery support and dug-in Jagdpanther tank destroyers to parry the thrust, destroying six French tanks and four halftracks. Artzenheim was taken by the French II Corps on 1 February.

Fighting in the zone of the 3rd Division, the French 1st Parachute Regiment attacked and seized Widensolen early on 31 January. By 17:00, patrols of the U.S. 3rd Division had reached the Rhône-Rhine Canal, some 5 miles (8.0 km) southeast from the division's crossing points over the Colmar Canal. On the same day, French CC6 was relieved from attachment to the U.S. 3rd Division, having taken severe losses with only 13 operational tanks in its tank battalion and 30 effectives in its French Foreign Legion rifle company. In its stead arrived a combat command of the French 2nd Armored Division. On 1 February, the 15th and 30th Infantry Regiments moved south along the Rhône-Rhine Canal reaching the area just north of Neuf-Brisach. On 2–3 February, the 7th Infantry drove south along the same canal passing through Artzenheim and taking Biesheim after a bitter day-long battle. Near Biesheim, Technician 5 Forrest E. Peden of 3rd Division artillery dashed through intense German fire on 3 February to summon help for an ambushed infantry unit. Returning on a light tank, Peden was killed when the tank was hit and destroyed. For his heroism, Peden was posthumously awarded the Medal of Honor.

After a day spent consolidating its positions, the 3rd Division moved south again on 5 February, taking Vogelgrun the following day. The fortified town of Neuf-Brisach was swiftly entered and taken on 6 February, by the 30th Infantry, with the help of two French children and another civilian, who showed the Americans undefended passages into the town. The Germans, having evacuated what remained of their men and equipment, had destroyed the bridge over the Rhine at Breisach. The taking of Neuf-Brisach marked the end of operations in the Colmar Pocket for the U.S. 3rd Infantry Division.

==== Clearing the pocket between Colmar and the Rhine ====
The 75th Division entered the front lines on 31 January, between the U.S. 3rd and 28th Infantry Divisions. Attacking on 1 February, the 289th Infantry Regiment cleared Horbourg and the 290th Infantry Regiment advanced on Andolsheim (48°03′54″N 07°24′54″E) occupying the town at 14:00 on 2 February. The same day, the 75th Division made diversionary attacks to cover the Allied drive on the city of Colmar, adjacent to the division's western sector. On 3 February, the 75th Division cleared the Forêt Domaniale (48°03′18″N 07°27′36″E) and consolidated its gains the following day. Moving again on 5 February, the division overran Appenwihr (48°01′37.2″N 07°26′24″E), Hettenschlag (48°00′18″N 07°27′18″E), and Wolfgantzen (48°01′30″N 07°30′00″E). On 6 February, the 75th Division reached the Rhône-Rhine Canal south of Neuf-Brisach. This action brought a close to U.S. 75th Infantry Division operations in the Colmar Pocket.

==== Liberation of Colmar ====
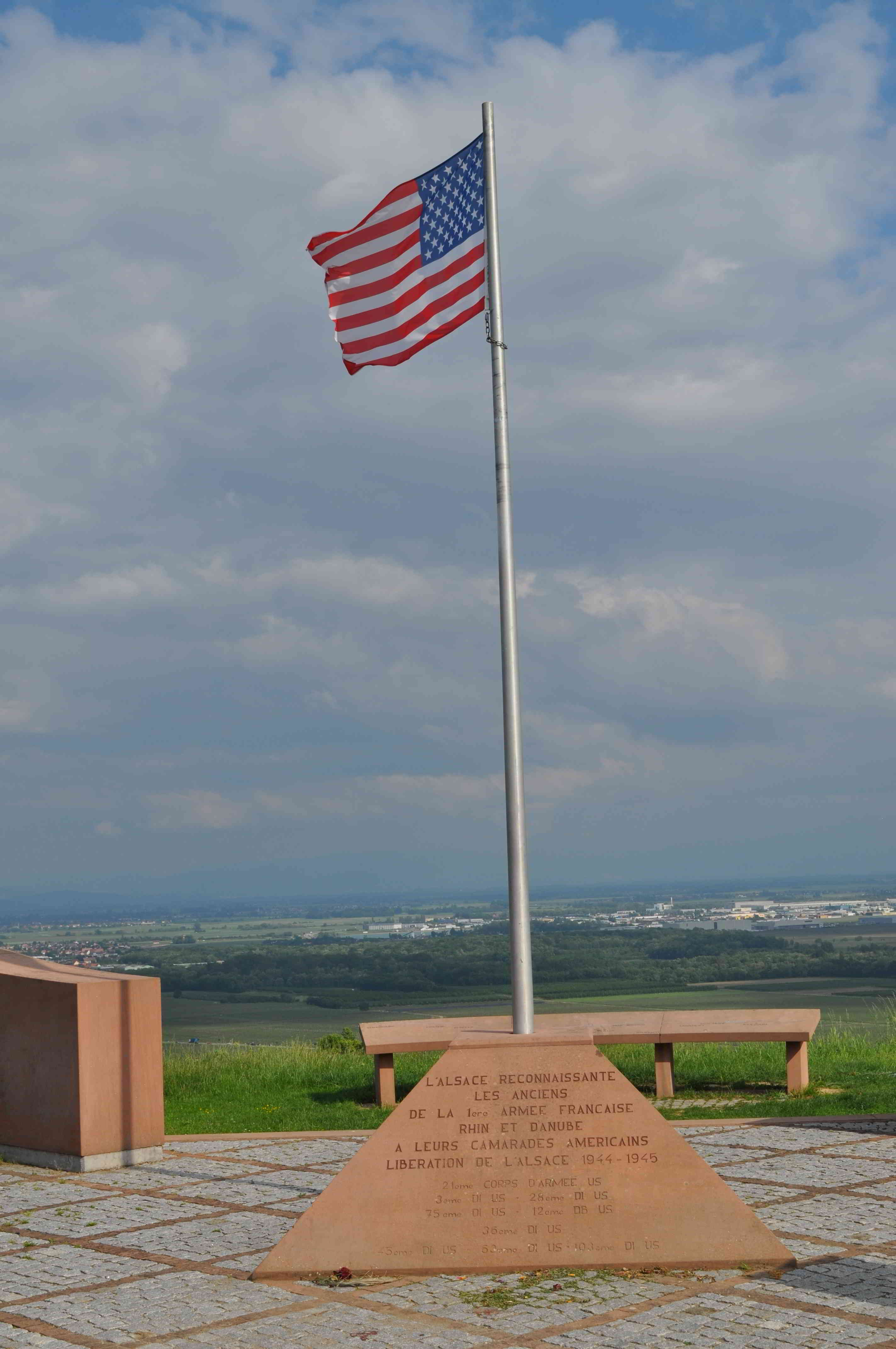
Monument at the top of Mont de Sigolsheim honors the American soldiers who fought for the liberation of Alsace

Having been on the defense to this point in the battle, General Norman Cota's 28th Division was teamed with the French armored combat command CC4 and told to take the city of Colmar. Leading with the U.S. 109th Infantry Regiment on 2 February, the infantry crossed an anti-tank ditch north of the city, while the French armor located a crossing point over the obstacle. This accomplished, the French armor plunged into Colmar reaching the Place Rapp (Rapp Square) at 11:30. On 2–3 February, the 109th Infantry, the French CC4, 1st Parachute Regiment and commandos cleared the city of Germans. In a symbolic act, the French 152nd Infantry Regiment re-entered Colmar, its pre-war garrison. Pushing south on 3 February the 112th Infantry entered Turckheim (48°05′06″N 07°16′30″E) and cleared Ingersheim (48°05′53″N 07°18′18″E) to the west of Colmar. Other units of the 28th Division joined the French in blocking German exit routes from the Vosges Mountains. On 6 February, the 28th Division moved eastwards to the Rhône-Rhine Canal on the south flank of the U.S. XXI Corps ending 28th Division participation in the battle.

==== Colmar Pocket split ====
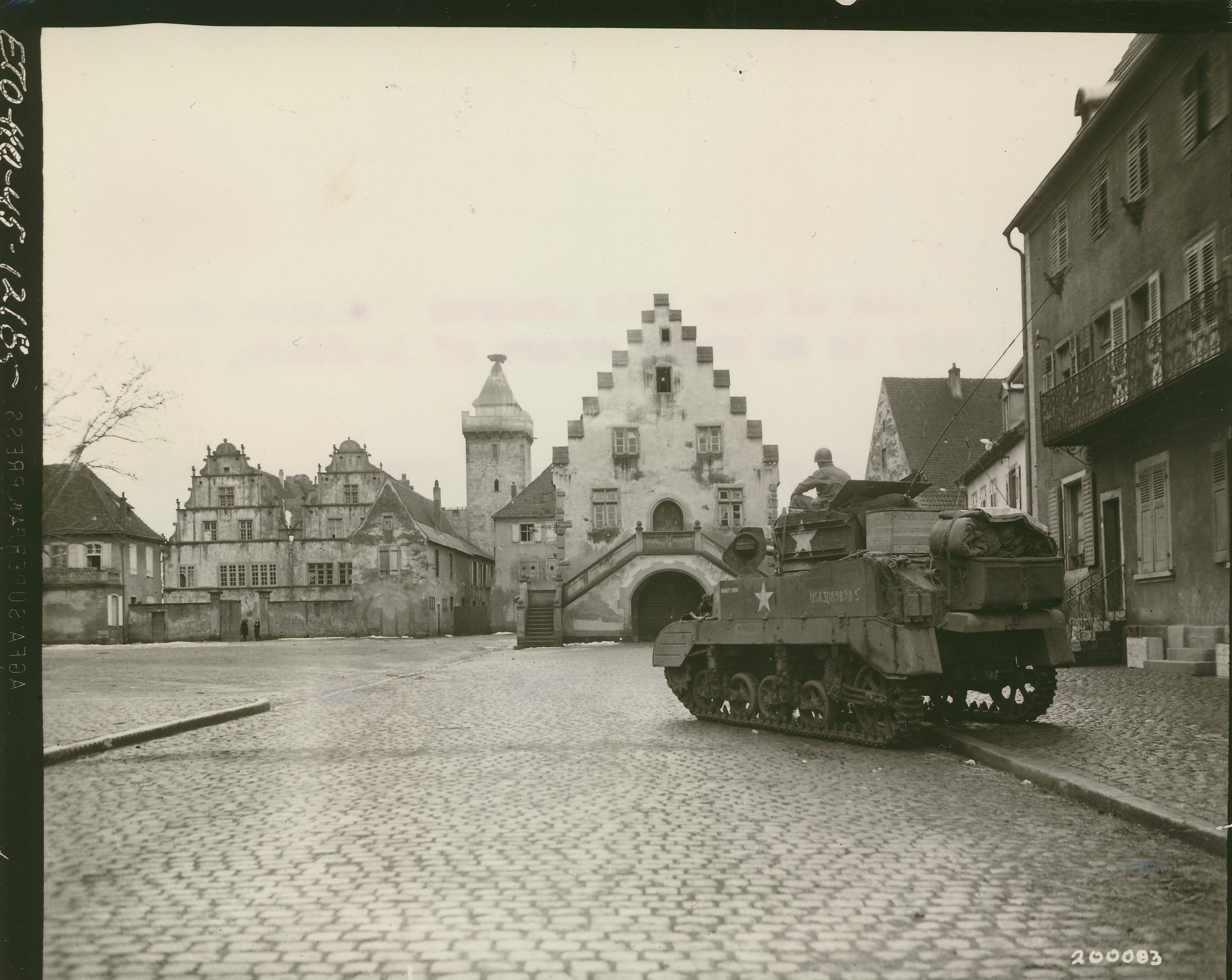
A light tank of the 12th Armored Division in Rouffach, 5 February 1945.

On 3 February, the 12th Armored Division moved south through 28th Division lines with the objective of linking up with the French I Corps and splitting the Colmar Pocket. Combat Command B (CCB) seized a bridgehead near Sundhoffen (Note: 48°02′42″N 07°24′54″E) and CCR advanced on the road between Colmar and Rouffach. (Note: 47°57′18″N 07°17′59″E) The following day, CCA captured Hattstatt (Note: 48°00′36″N 07°08′18″E) on the Colmar-Rouffach Road, but CCR found its way blocked by German defenses. On 5 February, CCA entered Rouffach and made contact with the 4th Moroccan Mountain Division of the French I Corps, some 17 days after French I Corps launched its assault. The same day, CCR entered the village of Herrlisheim-près-Colmar (Note: 48°01′12″N 07°19′12″E), and so the 12th Armored Division attacked, for a second time, a town named Herrlisheim in Alsace (the battles of the 12th Armored Division in mid-January 1945, at Herrlisheim north of Strasbourg saw several battalions of the division manhandled by German troops in the Gambsheim bridgehead.) Thereafter, during the battle, the 12th Armored Division screened German exit routes from the Vosges Mountains and supported the 28th Division by fire.

=== Collapse of the Colmar Pocket ===
At the start of February, the French I Corps was still clearing scattered German resistance south of the Thur River between Cernay and Ensisheim, both of which were still under German control. The clearing of this area was not completed until 3 February. On 4 February, I Corps assaulted north across the Thur River and, encountering only limited German resistance, the 4th Moroccan Mountain Division was able to push to the southern outskirts of Rouffach. Cernay, abandoned by the Germans, was occupied the same day. The following day, the 4th Moroccan Division linked up with the U.S. 12th Armored Division in Rouffach, and the 9th Colonial Infantry Division attacked Ensisheim, the original corps objective. Hirtzfelden was taken by the 2nd Moroccan Infantry Division on 6 February and the 9th Colonial Division completed the capture of Ensisheim and drove east into the Harth Woods. On 7 February, both the 9th Colonial Division and 1st Armored Division reached the Rhône-Rhine Canal east of Ensisheim. The Spahis cavalry brigade and the 151st Infantry Regiment cleared the Harth Woods on 8 February while the 1st Armored Division advanced south toward the German bridgehead at Chalampé in addition to linking up with elements of the French 2nd Armored Division at Fessenheim the same day.

During this period, the shrinking German presence on the west side of the Rhine was subjected to heavy artillery fire and airstrikes by U.S. and French aircraft. Finally, on 9 February I Corps eliminated the German rearguard at Chalampé, and with no major German forces left on the west bank of the Rhine in the region of Colmar, the Germans blew up the bridge over the Rhine at Chalampé. This signaled the end of Allied operations in the Colmar Pocket and the end of any significant German military presence in Alsace.

== Aftermath ==
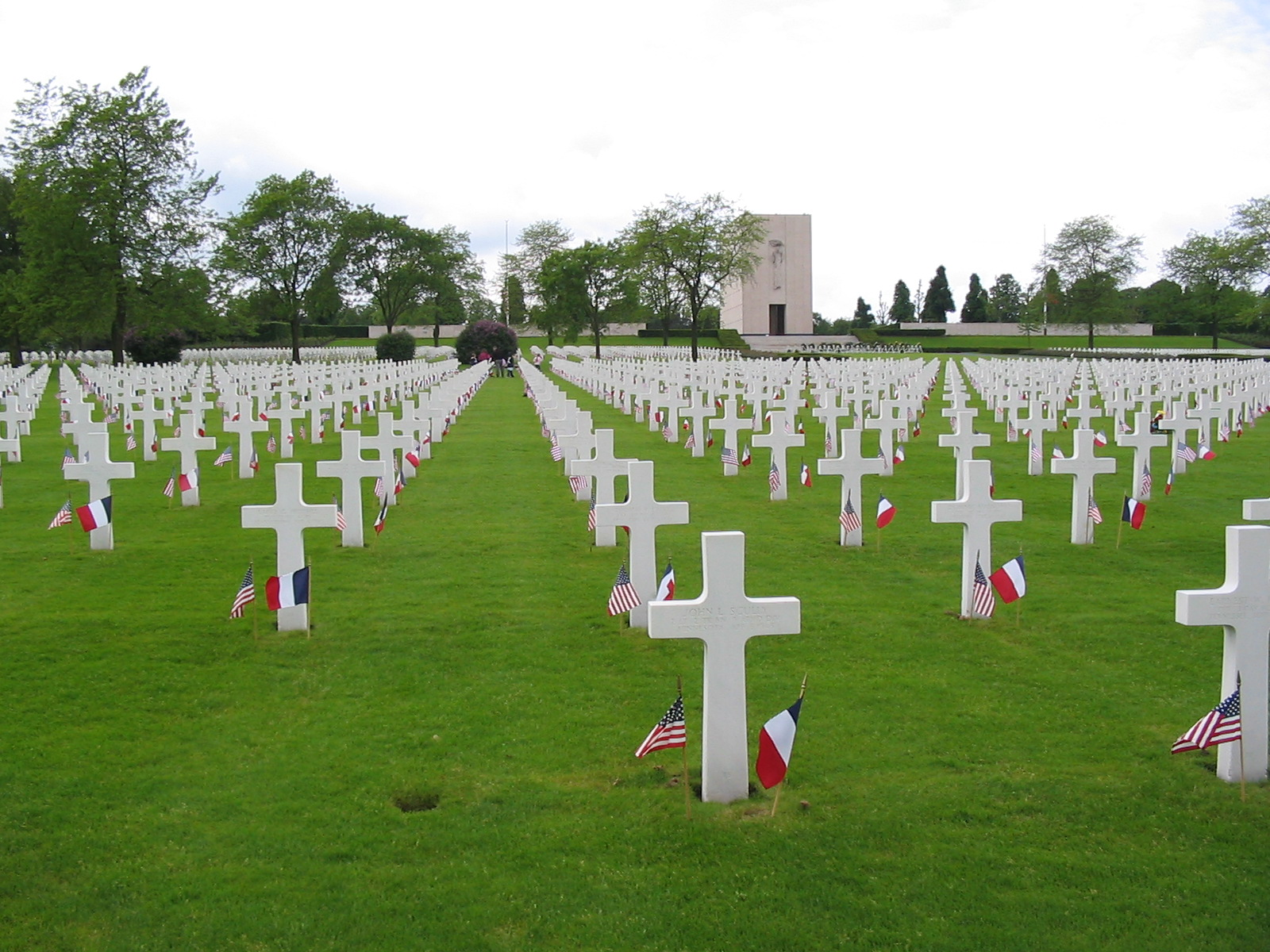
Lorraine American Cemetery in Saint-Avold, final resting place for many U.S. soldiers who fell during the fighting in the Colmar Pocket.

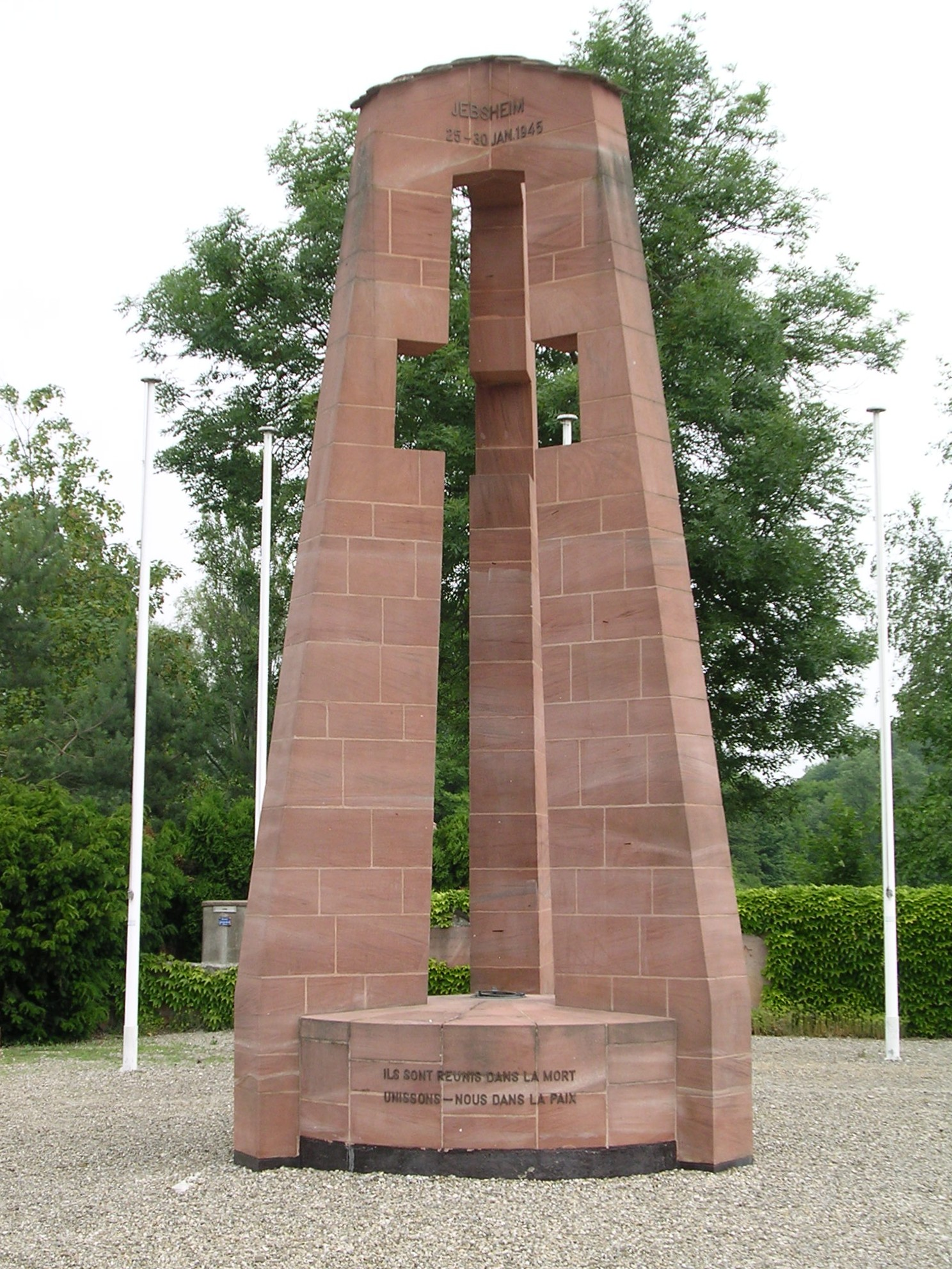
Colmar Pocket monument in Jebsheim

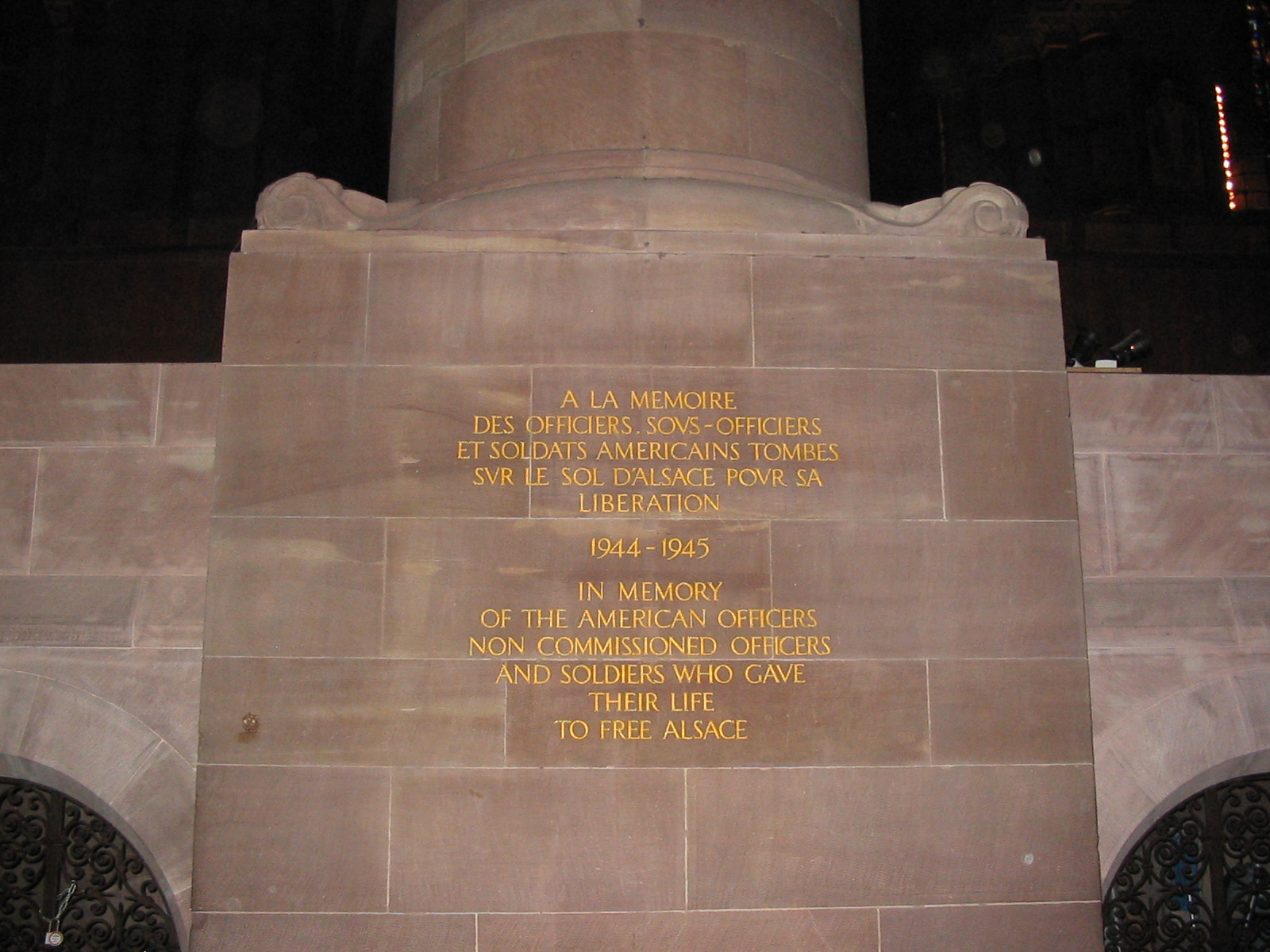
Memorial to fallen U.S. troops in the Strasbourg Cathedral.

In compliance with General Eisenhower's direction, the Colmar Pocket was eliminated, and the U.S. 6th Army Group stood on the Rhine, from the Swiss border to a region well north of Strasbourg. The German 19th Army, although not completely destroyed, lost the bulk of its experienced combat troops (only the 708th Volksgrenadier Division escaped somewhat intact) and was forced to reform in Baden, using large infusions of inexperienced Volkssturm to replace its grievous losses on the plains of Alsace. The Germans left behind 55 armored vehicles and 66 artillery pieces. The elimination of the Colmar Pocket allowed the 6th Army Group to concentrate on Operation Undertone, its assault to penetrate the Siegfried Line and invade Germany, undertaken in March 1945. (Note: Operation Undertone, in which U.S. Seventh Army and French II Corps assaulted through the Wissembourg Gap, the Bienwald Forest, and the Palatinate Forest, defeating German Siegfried Line defenses and closing to the Rhine River from Worms to Karlsruhe.)

For the fourth time in 75 years, the province of Alsace had changed hands between France and Germany.

After the battle, the French granted the U.S. 3rd Infantry Division the right to wear the Croix de Guerre, and the president awarded the division, as an entity, the Distinguished Unit Citation. The U.S. 109th Infantry Regiment (28th Division) was also granted the right to wear the Croix de Guerre.

Today, numerous streets in Alsace are named after Allied commanders and units that fought in the battle, and there are French and U.S. military cemeteries in the area.

== See also ==
- Allied advance from Paris to the Rhine
- Alsace campaign
- Battle of the Bulge
- Liberation of France
- Operation Nordwind

== Notes ==
Footnotes

Citations
