= LXIII Army Corps =

Military unit of the Wehrmacht

The LXIII Army Corps (German: LXIII. Armeekorps) was an army corps of the German Wehrmacht during World War II. The corps was formed in November 1944.

== History ==
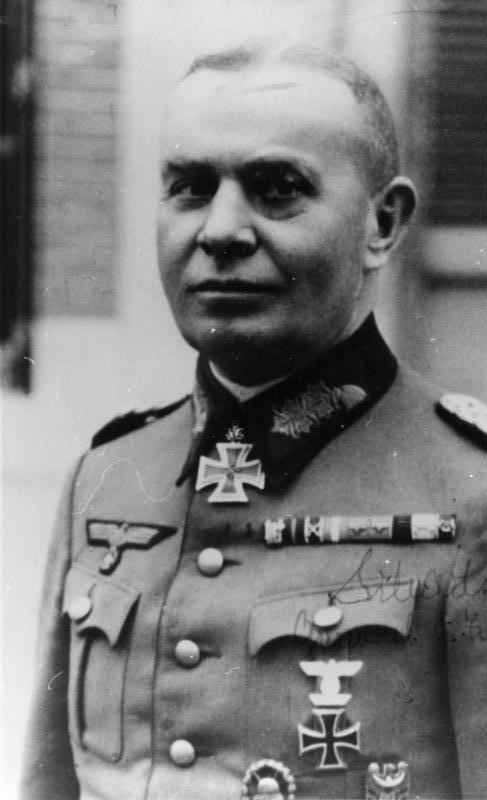
Friedrich-August Schack

The LXIII Army Corps was formed on 14 November 1944 using the officer staff of Generalkommando Dehner in southern France. The initial corps commander of the LXIII Army Corps was Friedrich-August Schack.

The corps was initially assigned to 19th Army (Friedrich Wiese) in the Upper Rhine area, initially under Army Group G (Hermann Balck), between December 1944 and January 1945. On 13 December 1944, Schack was succeeded as corps commander by Erich Abraham.

By 1945, the 19th Army under which LXIII Army Corps was placed had been moved from the supervision of Army Group G to the supervision of Army Group Upper Rhine (Heinrich Himmler). The corps was then moved to the 1st Parachute Army (Alfred Schlemm) under Army Group H (Johannes Blaskowitz) in February and March 1945 and eventually the Army Detachment Lüttwitz (Heinrich v. Lüttwitz) under Army Group B (Walter Model), where it remained until the end of the war.

== Structure ==
Organizational structure of the LXIII (63rd) Wehrmacht Army Corps
Year	Date	Commander	Subordinate Divisions	Army	Army Group
1944	26 November	Friedrich-August Schack	30th SS, 159th Infantry, 189th Infantry, 198th Infantry, 338th Infantry, Panzerbrigade 106	19th Army (Wiese, Rasp)	Army Group G (Balck)
1944	31 December	Erich Abraham	159th Infantry, 269th Infantry, 338th Infantry	19th Army (Wiese, Rasp)	Army Group Oberrhein (Himmler)
1945	19 February	Erich Abraham	None	1st Parachute Army (Schlemm)	Army Group H (Blaskowitz)
1945	1 March	Erich Abraham	406th Infantry	1st Parachute Army (Schlemm)	Army Group H (Blaskowitz)
1945	12 April	Erich Abraham	Hamburg, 2nd Parachute	Army Detachment Lüttwitz (v. Lüttwitz)	Army Group B (Model)

== Noteworthy individuals ==
- Friedrich-August Schack, corps commander between 14 November 1944 and 13 December 1944.
- Erich Abraham, corps commander between 13 December 1944 and the end of the war.
