= Eduard Zorn =

- Born: 8 August 1901; Munich, Bavaria, German Empire
- Died: 4 February 1945 (aged 43); Colmar, Nazi Germany (present-day Grand Est, France)
- Burial place: Munich Waldfriedhof
- Relatives: Hans Zorn (brother)
- Military career
- Allegiance: Weimar Republic); Nazi Germany
- Branch: Army
- Service years: 1921–45
- Rank: Generalmajor (Posthumously)
- Commands: 189th Infantry Division
- Conflicts: World War II: Colmar Pocket †
- Awards: Knight's Cross of the Iron Cross with Oak Leaves

Eduard Emil Karl Zorn (8 August 1901 – 4 February 1945) was a German officer in the Wehrmacht during World War II. He was a recipient of the Knight's Cross of the Iron Cross with Oak Leaves of Nazi Germany. Zorn was killed on 4 February 1945 in the Colmar Pocket. He was posthumously promoted to Generalmajor and awarded the Oak Leaves to his Knight's Cross.

== Awards and decorations ==
- Iron Cross (1939) 2nd Class (18 December 1939) & 1st Class (28 May 1940)
- Knight's Cross of the Iron Cross with Oak Leaves
  - Knight's Cross on 25 December 1944 as Oberst i.G. and commander of 189.Infanterie-Division
  - 739th Oak Leaves on 16 February 1945 as Oberst i.G. and commander of 189.Infanterie-Division

Military offices
Preceded by Generlmajor Joachim Degener	Commander of 189. Infanterie-Division; 15 November 1944 – 4 February 1945	Succeeded by Oberst Mellwig
