= Arnold Freiherr von Biegeleben =

German general (1883–1940)

- Born: 16 April 1883; Hanover, Kingdom of Prussia, German Empire
- Died: 11 October 1940 (aged 57); Jullouville, France
- Burial place: La Cambe German war cemetery
- Military career
- Allegiance: German Empire; Weimar Republic; Nazi Germany
- Branch: Army (Wehrmacht)
- Service years: 1901–1940
- Rank: Generalleutnant
- Commands: 6th Infantry Division
- Conflicts: World War I: First Battle of the Marne; Battle of Verdun; Battle of the Somme; Battle of Passchendaele; Battle of Cambrai (1917); German spring offensive; World War II: Saar Offensive; Battle of France
- Awards: Knight's Cross of the Iron Cross

Arnold Christian Maria Joseph Rüdiger Freiherr von Biegeleben (* 16 April 1883 in Hanover, German Empire, † 11 October 1940 in Jullouville, France) was a German general during World War II who commanded the 6th Infantry Division (6. Infanterie-Division) of the Wehrmacht. He was awarded the Knight's Cross of the Iron Cross.

== Family ==
Arnold Freiherr von Biegeleben came from the Westphalian-Hessian noble family of Biegeleben. He was the son of the Prussian Generalmajor Ludwig Maximilian Freiherr von Biegeleben (1849-1921) and Therese, née Freiin von Esebeck (1854-1945). Ludwig Maximilian's father was Maximilian von Biegeleben (1813-1899), who had been a senior government official of the Grand Duchy of Hesse and had been elevated to the rank of Freiherr (baron) in 1893. Arnold was married on 21 January 1931 to Alexandrine (Alexa), née Freiin von Landsberg-Velen (1902-1935).

== Military Service ==
Biegeleben began his military career on 29 March 1901 as a Fahnenjunker (officer candidate) in the 1. Großherzoglich Hessische Feldartillerie-Regiment Nr. 25. He was commissioned a Leutnant in that regiment on 18 August 1902 and promoted to Oberleutnant on 18 August 1910.

After the outbreak of World War I, Biegeleben went into action with his regiment on the Western Front. He was promoted to Hauptmann on 8 October 1914, serving as a battery commander and from 1 February 1917 as battalion commander of the regiment's III. Abteilung. For his achievements during the war, Biegeleben was decorated with both classes of the Iron Cross, the Knight's Cross with Swords of the Prussian Royal House Order of Hohenzollern, and the Hessian General Honor Decoration "For Bravery."

After the Armistice of 11 November 1918, the return of his regiment to Germany, and its demobilization, Biegeleben spent a year as adjutant in the headquarters (Generalkommando) of the VI Reserve Corps (VI. Reserve-Korps) in the defense of Germany's post-war eastern frontier (Grenzschutz Ost). He was then transferred to the newly formed Reichswehr, serving as a cavalry officer in Reiter-Regiment 6 (later renamed 6. (Preußisches) Reiter-Regiment) from 1920 to 1925, on the staff of the 1. Kavallerie-Division from 1925 to 1929, and with the 15. (Preußisches) Reiter-Regiment from 1929 to 1935. He was promoted to Major on 1 November 1924 and Oberstleutnant on 1 October 1929. He commanded the 15. (Preußisches) Reiter-Regiment from 1 October 1931 until 30 April 1935 and was promoted to Oberst on 1 October 1932.

With his subsequent promotion to Generalmajor on 1 May 1935, Biegeleben was named Kavallerie-Kommandeur Hannover. From 1 April 1936, he served as Höherer Kavallerieoffizier 2, a command formed from the staff of the former 2. Kavallerie-Brigade. He was promoted to Generalleutnant on 1 August 1937 and named Höherer Kavallerieoffizier 4 on 12 October 1937. On 15 February 1938, he was named commander of the 6th Infantry Division with effect from 1 March 1938.

With the mobilization at the start of World War II, Biegeleben's division was initially used to secure Germany's western border, seeing action in the French Saar Offensive. In the 1940 campaign, his division marched through Luxembourg and Belgium into France. He was awarded the Knight's Cross of the Iron Cross on 5 August 1940 for his leadership of the division in the campaign. He remained with his division in the occupation of France and died in Jullouville of a heart attack on 11 October 1940.

== Awards and decorations ==
- Kingdom of Prussia: Iron Cross 2nd Class (14 September 1914)
- Kingdom of Prussia: Iron Cross 1st Class (3 March 1916)
- Grand Duchy of Hesse: General Honor Decoration "For Bravery." (25 November 1914)
- Kingdom of Prussia: Royal House Order of Hohenzollern, Knight's Cross with Swords (24 November 1917)
- Germany: Honor Cross of the World War 1914/1918 for Combatants
- Kingdom of Bulgaria: Order of Saint Alexander, Grand Officer (15 September 1936)
- Germany: Wehrmacht Long Service Award 1st to 4th Class (2 October 1936)
- Germany: 1939 Clasp to the Iron Cross 2nd Class (6 October 1939)
- Germany: 1939 Clasp to the Iron Cross 1st Class (30 October 1939)
- Germany: West Wall Medal (11 March 1940)
- Germany: Knight's Cross of the Iron Cross on 5 August 1940 as Generalleutnant and commander of 6th Infantry Division

Military offices
Preceded by General der Pioniere Walter Kuntze	Commander of 6th Infantry Division; 1 March 1938 - 11 October 1940	Succeeded by Generalleutnant Helge Auleb
