= Erhard Berner =

German general (1894–1960)

- Born: 12 September 1894; Schellerhau
- Died: 25 July 1960 (aged 65)
- Military career
- Allegiance: Nazi Germany
- Branch: Army (Wehrmacht)
- Service years: 1914–1918; 1934–1945
- Rank: Generalmajor
- Commands: 76th Infantry Division
- Conflicts: World War II
- Awards: Knight's Cross of the Iron Cross

Erhard-Heinrich Berner (12 September 1894 – 25 July 1960) was a German general during World War II who commanded several divisions. He was a recipient of the Knight's Cross of the Iron Cross of Nazi Germany. Berner surrendered to the Red Army in 1945. Convicted as a war criminal in the Soviet Union, he was held until 1955.

== Awards and decorations ==
- German Cross in Gold on 24 December 1941 as Major in Infanterie-Regiment 508
- Knight's Cross of the Iron Cross on 18 January 1945 as Oberst and commander of Jäger-Regiment 28

Military offices
Preceded by Oberst Dr. Wilhelm-Moritz Freiherr von Bissing	Commander of 76. Infanterie-Division; 14 February 1945 – 8 May 1945	Succeeded by none
