= XXXII Army Corps (Wehrmacht) =

- Stellvertretendes Generalkommando II. Armeekorps; Generalkommando XXXII. Armeekorps
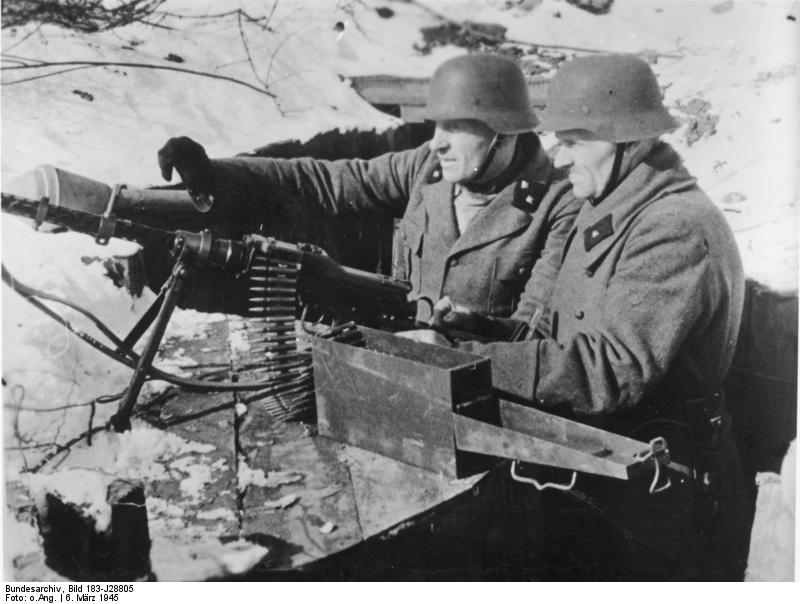
- Active: 26 March 1945 – 8 May 1945
- Disbanded: 8 May 1945
- Country: Nazi Germany

The XXXII Corps (German: XXXII. Armeekorps) was a corps-level command of the German Army in the last two months of World War II.

It was created on 26 March 1945, from the troops in Military Region (Wehrkreis) II in Stettin. The staff came from the Stellvertretendes Generalkommando II. Armeekorps based at Stettin. The Corps was engaged, as part of the 3rd Panzer Army in Army Group Vistula, against the Soviet Army which was at that time already at the gates of the city. The battle ended in defeat and the Soviet Red Army captured Stettin on 26 April 1945.

The Corps fled to the west with the rest of the 3rd Panzer Army, and surrendered to the British.

== Commanding officers ==
- General der Infanterie Friedrich-August Schack, 26 March 1945 – 8 May 1945

=== Commanders of Wehrkreis II (Stellvertretendes Generalkommando II. Armeekorps) ===
- Generalleutnant Hans Feige (26 August 1939 – 14 May 1940)
- Generalleutnant Max Föhrenbach (14 May 1940 – 1 May 1942)
- General der Infanterie Werner Kienitz (1 May 1942 – January 1945)
- General der Kavallerie Walter Braemer (January 1945 – 1 February 1945)
- General der Infanterie Walter Hörnlein (1 February 1945 – 26 March 1945)

== Sources ==
- XXXII. Armeekorps on Lexikon-der-wehrmacht.de
