= General Honor Decoration (Hesse) =

General Honour Decoration Allgemeines Ehrenzeichen
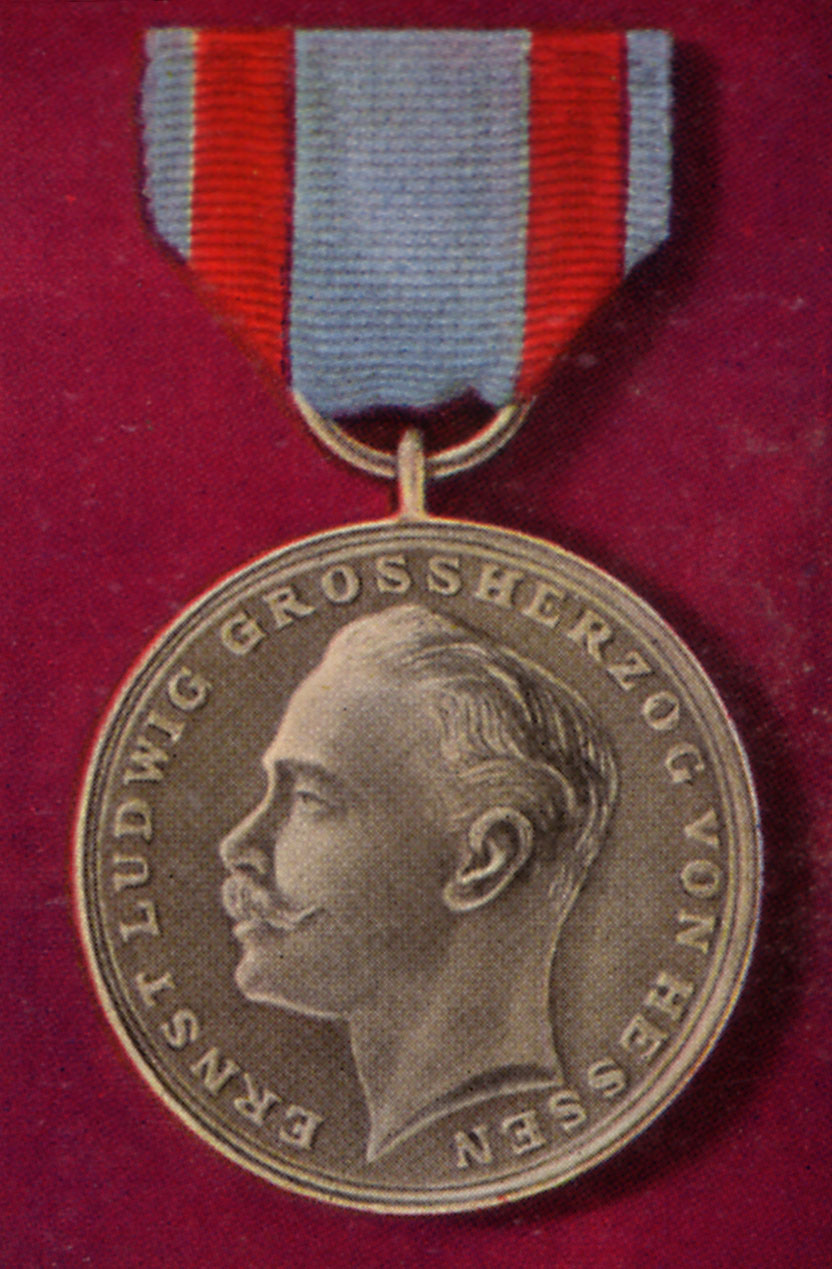
- Obverse of the General Honour Decoration of Hesse
- Type: Civil and military decoration
- Presented by: the Grand Duchy of Hesse
- Established: 25 September 1843
- Ribbon of the decoration

The General Honour Decoration (German: Allgemeines Ehrenzeichen) was a civil and military decoration of the Grand Duchy of Hesse. Established 25 September 1843, the medal could be awarded to recognize several different accomplishments or merits, such as military merit, lifesaving and long service. The reason for the award of the medal was determined by the inscription on the reverse of the medal, with the obverse bearing the effigy of the reigning Grand Duke of Hesse.

The General Honour Decoration with the inscriptions "Für Tapferkeit" ("For Bravery") and "Für Kriegsverdienste" ("For War Merits") served as the primary military decoration of Hesse during World War I. As the rolls of the decoration were lost in World War II, a complete list of recipients is unknown.

== Recipients of the Hessian General Honour Decoration "For Bravery" (Hessische Tapferkeitsmedaille) ==
- Ernest Louis, Grand Duke of Hesse, Prussian general, last Grand Duke of Hesse and by Rhine
- Chlodwig, Landgrave of Hesse-Philippsthal-Barchfeld, Prussian officer
- Philipp, Landgrave of Hesse, Prussian lieutenant, Leib-Dragoner-Regiment (2. Großherzoglich Hessisches) Nr. 24
- Wilhelm II, German Emperor
- Wilhelm, German Crown Prince, Prussian general
- Rupprecht, Crown Prince of Bavaria, Bavarian field marshal (1915)
- Albrecht, Duke of Württemberg, Prussian/Württemberg field marshal (1915)
- Ernst Freiherr von Althaus, German fighter ace
- Walter Assmann, Prussian lieutenant, 5. Großherzoglich Hessisches Infanterie-Regiment Nr. 168, Generalleutnant in World War II
- Otto von Below, Prussian general
- Julius von Bernuth, Prussian lieutenant, Leibgarde-Infanterie-Regiment (1. Großherzoglich Hessisches) Nr. 115, Generalmajor in World War II
- Arnold Freiherr von Biegeleben, Prussian Hauptmann, 1. Großherzoglich Hessisches Feldartillerie-Regiment Nr. 25, Generalleutnant in World War II
- Werner von Blomberg, Prussian Hauptmann, later a German Wehrmacht field marshal
- Curt von Brandenstein, 1879-1964, Prussian Hauptmann, Infanterie-Leibregiment Großherzogin (3. Großherzoglich Hessisches) Nr. 117, recipient of the Pour le Mérite
- Julius Buckler, German fighter ace, native of the Grand Duchy of Hesse
- Nikolaus Burggraf und Graf zu Dohna-Schlodien, German naval officer
- Hans Felber, Prussian lieutenant, Infanterie-Leibregiment Großherzogin (3. Großherzoglich Hessisches) Nr. 117, General der Infanterie in World War II
- Franz Gall, Prussian lieutenant, Großherzoglich Hessisches Reserve-Infanterie-Regiment Nr. 254, Generalleutnant in World War II
- Wilhelm Groener, Prussian/Württemberg general (1916)
- Friedrich-Carl Hanesse, Prussian lieutenant, 1. Großherzoglich Hessisches Feldartillerie-Regiment Nr. 25, native of the Grand Duchy of Hesse, Luftwaffe General der Flieger
- Franz Hemer, German fighter ace, native of the Grand Duchy of Hesse
- Maximilian von Herff, Prussian lieutenant, Leibgarde-Infanterie-Regiment (1. Großherzoglich Hessisches) Nr. 115, SS Obergruppenführer
- Paul von Hindenburg, Prussian field marshal
- Karl-Adolf Hollidt, Prussian lieutenant, Infanterie-Leibregiment Großherzogin (3. Großherzoglich Hessisches) Nr. 117, Generaloberst in World War II
- Oskar von Hutier, Prussian general
- Wilhelm Keitel, Prussian general staff officer, later a German Wehrmacht field marshal
- Alfred Keller, Prussian aviator, later a Luftwaffe Generaloberst
- Konrad Krafft von Dellmensingen, Bavarian general (1915)
- Georg von Küchler, Prussian officer, 1. Großherzoglich Hessisches Feldartillerie-Regiment Nr. 25, later a German Wehrmacht field marshal
- Otto Liman von Sanders, Prussian/Ottoman general who began his military service in Hesse regiments
- Fritz von Loßberg, Prussian colonel, later general
- Erich Ludendorff, Prussian general
- Rudolf Lüters, Prussian officer, native of the Grand Duchy of Hesse, General der Infanterie in World War II
- Smilo Freiherr von Lüttwitz, Prussian lieutenant, Leib-Dragoner-Regiment (2. Großherzoglich Hessisches) Nr. 24, General der Panzertruppe in World War II and Generalleutnant in the Bundeswehr
- Manfred Freiherr von Richthofen, German fighter ace
- Georg Graf von Rittberg, Prussian lieutenant, 2. Großherzoglich Hessisches Feldartillerie-Regiment Nr. 61, Generalleutnant in World War II
- Ehrhard Schmidt, German admiral, native of the Grand Duchy of Hesse
- Ludwig von Schröder, German admiral
- Hans von Seeckt, Prussian general
- Ernst Sieler, Prussian lieutenant, Infanterie-Regiment Prinz Carl (4. Großherzoglich Hessisches) Nr. 118, Generalleutnant in World War II
- Hans-Ludwig Speth, Prussian lieutenant, native of the Grand Duchy of Hesse, General der Artillerie in World War II
- Hermann von Strantz, Prussian general
- Carl-Heinrich von Stülpnagel, Prussian officer, Leibgarde-Infanterie-Regiment (1. Großherzoglich Hessisches) Nr. 115, General der Infanterie in World War II, member of the 20 July Plot
- Walter von Unruh, Prussian officer, General der Infanterie in World War II
- Georg Wetzell, Prussian officer, General der Infanterie in the Reichswehr
- Oskar Ritter und Edler von Xylander, Bavarian general (1916)
- Gustav-Adolf von Zangen, Prussian lieutenant, Infanterie-Leibregiment Großherzogin (3. Großherzoglich Hessisches) Nr. 117, native of the Grand Duchy of Hesse, General der Infanterie in World War II

== Bibliography ==
- Klietmann, Dr. Kurt-Gerhard (1966). Pour le Mérite und Tapferkeitsmedaille. Berlin, Germany: Verlag "Die Ordenssammlung".
- Miller, Michael (2015). Leaders Of The Storm Troops Volume 1. England: Helion & Company. ISBN 978-1-909982-87-1.
- Nimmergut, Jörg (1997). Deutsche Orden und Ehrenzeichen bis 1945. Munich, Germany: Zentralstelle für Wissenschaftliche Ordenskunde. ISBN 3-00-001396-2.
- O'Connor, Neal W. (2002). Aviation Awards of Imperial Germany and the Men Who Earned Them, Volume VII. Princeton, New Jersey: Schiffer Publishing Ltd. ISBN 0-7643-1626-5.
