= Carl Rodenburg =

German Army general (1894-1992)

- Born: 17 May 1894; Geestemünde, German Empire
- Died: 5 November 1992 (aged 98); Greven, Germany
- Military career
- Allegiance: German Empire; Weimar Republic; Nazi Germany
- Branch: Army
- Service years: 1912–1945
- Rank: Generalleutnant
- Commands: 76th Infantry Division
- Conflicts: World War I World War II
- Awards: Knight's Cross of the Iron Cross with Oak Leaves

Carl Rodenburg (17 May 1894 – 5 November 1992) was a lieutenant general in the Wehrmacht of Nazi Germany who commanded the 76th Infantry Division during the Battle of Stalingrad. He was a recipient of the Knight's Cross of the Iron Cross with Oak Leaves. Rodenburg surrendered to the Soviet forces on 31 January 1943, during the Battle of Stalingrad. He was held until 1955.

== First World War ==
Carl Rodenburg was born in Geestemünde bei Bremerhaven as the son of Senator Carl D. Rodenburg, scion of a wealthy merchant family and his wife Julie, née Bade. Aftter having passed his A-levels (Abitur) in 1912, his parents send him on a Grand Tour through Europe. Carl Rodenburg joined the Army of the Kingdom of Wurttemberg/ Imperial German Army on 1 October 1913 as a one-year volunteer (Einjährig-Freiwilliger) i.e. Officer Cadet, a common path for educated young men from privileged backgrounds seeking commissions. He served in the 5th Battalion of Badisches Infanterie-Regiment Nr. 113 in Freiburg in Baden. Mobilized at the outbreak of the Great War, he first fought on the Western Front. On 11 March 1915 (Patent of 11 September 1915) he was commissioned as a 2nd Lieutenant of 5. Badische Infanterie-Regiment Nr. 113. Promoted to 1st Lieutenant Oberleutnant on 20 June 2018, he fought both on the Western and Eastern Front as a platoon and company commander. At the Armistice he was decorated with both classes of the iron cross, Eisernen Kreuz wore the cross of a Knight 2nd Class of the Order of the Lion of Zähringen (Ritterkreuz des Ordens vom Zähringer Löwen) with swords and the Hanseatic Cross (Hanseatenkreuz) by the ciry of Bremen.

== Between the Wars ==
In the Weimar Republic, Rodenburg was retained by the Reichswehr. In 1923, he commanded the 12th (Machine Gun)-Company of 14. (Badisches) Infanterie-Regiment. On 1 February 1927 he was promoted to Captain Hauptmann and, in 1931, commanded the 5th Company in the same regiment. Rodenburg was promoted to Major on 15 October 1935 and was made Commanding Officer 2nd Battalion, 12th Infantry Regiment. Promoted to Lieutenant Colonel on 1 April 1937, he, from 1 November 1938 commanded the training department (Lehrstab) of Germany's Infantry School at Döberitz Infanterieschule Döberitz as Chief Instructor.

== Second World War ==
On 1 September 1939, Rodenburg was promoted to officer commanding all officer cadet training at Infantry School Döberitz. Not seeing frontline command during the campaign in Poland, Rodenburg successfully lobbied for a frontline command. On 1 January 1940 he took command of Infanterie-Regiments 203, part of 76. Infanterie-Division. He was promoted to Colonel Oberst on 1 April 1940. With his regiment, he fought successfully in the Battle of France Westfeldzug in the regions of Verdun and Toul. In 1941, his regiment was transferred to the east in preparation for Operation Barbarossa. He fought at the Eastern Front Ostfront where his regiment successfully crossed the river Dnepr and set up bridgeheads on the eastern side. His regiment was the first to break through the Stalin-Linie. On 26 Januar 1942, Rodenburg was temporarily made Officer Commanding 76th Infantry Division, replacing Generalmajor Maximilian de Angelis who took command of XXXXIV Army Corps. He was awarded the German Cross in Gold for repeated bravery on 7 March 1942. Rodenburg was Mentioned in the Despatches (Nennung im Wehrmachtsbericht) on 11 March 1942. His command of 76th Infantry Division was made permanent and he was promoted to Major General (Generalmajor) on 1 April 1942. From July to mid August 1942, the division took part in the Battle of Kalach (Kesselschlacht bei Kalatsch) and contributed to significantly to that victory. The division engaged in battles between the Don and Volga rivers starting August 24, 1942, holding defensive positions on high ground south of Kotluban and repelling major Soviet counterattacks on September 18 and September 23, during which it and attached units destroyed 227 enemy tanks. These actions earned Rodenburg the Knight's Cross of the Iron Cross (Ritterkreuz des Eisernen Kreuzes) on 8 October 1942, recognizing his leadership in maintaining the division's sector amid intense fighting.

During the Battle of Stalingrad, Rodenburg's 76th Infantry Division was caught in the Stalingrad pocket Stalingrad in November 1942 and fought gallantly against all ods and with dwindling resources. Rodenburg was promoted to Lieutenant-General on 1 December 1942. On the morning of 31 January 1943, while still commanding the same division now under Army Group Don, Rodenburg was awarded the 189th Oak Leaves to the Knights Cross. This to honour his division's steadfast defense northeast of Verkhnyaya Yelshanka from 22 to 28 November 1942, which blocked a Soviet thrust toward Don River bridges and facilitated counter-maneuvers by the XI Army and XIV Panzer Corps south of Stalingrad; his artillery regiment, repurposed as infantry, further excelled in assaulting Soviet lines at the Bolshaya Rossoshka collective farm on 18 January 1943.

The award was presented by Field Marshal Paulus in 6th Army's headquarters. Rodenburg's wife was simultaniously presented with oakleaves in Berlin. His photo was taken on this occasion and the photo was flown out with one of the last aircraft to leave. On the evening of the same day, he was taken prisoner of war by the Red Army together with Field Marshal Paulus.

== Prisoner of War ==
Rodenburg spent the next few years in various camps in the Soviet Union. These included NKVD camps No. 160 Suzdal, No. 74 Oranki, No. 119 Selenodolsk (Republic of Tatarstan), No. 48 Cherncy, Lezhnovo, No. 168 Minsk, and No. 476 Sverdlovsk. He was also imprisoned in prisons No. 1 Minsk, No. 3 Brest, and No. 1 Sverdlovsk. Together with Colonel General Karl Strecker, Lieutenant General Hans-Heinrich Sixt von Armin, Colonel General Walter Heitz, and Lieutenant General Arthur Schmidt, he belonged to the conservative or anti-communist group of officers in his camp. He joined the League of German Officers (Bund Deutscher Offiziere/ BDO) and was a member of the league's board. Rodenburg was no push-over and resisted soviet communist indoctrination, Dmitri Sacharowitsch Manuilski suspected in 1944, that Rodenburg was the real author of the Seydlitz-Memorandum. This suspicion was reported to Stalin. The NKVD reacted by accusing him of "leading an illegal fascist organisation in the League of German Officers", he was dismissed from the organisation and held in solitary confinement. On November 15, 1949, he was sentenced by the Military Tribunal of the Ministry of Internal Affairs of the Minsk region to 25 years in a labor camp for war crimes.

== Release from captivity and later life ==
Rodenburg was released from Soviet captivity in October 1955 and repatriated to West Germany where he was processed through the reception center at Friedland. This was a standard procedure for verifying identities and providing initial medical and administrative support for released German POW. He retired to a quiet life with no recorded involvement in military, political or professional activities and spent much time in nature. Rodenburg corresponded with numerous historians, veterans and journalists but never published a memoir. When asked about why he would not write his memoirs, he replied that "only those who feel that they have to explain their shortcomings away need to write books" Rodenburg resided in Lübeck, Schleswig-Holstein. He died on 5 November 1992 at the age of 98.

== Personal life ==
On 15 February 1920, Rodenburg married Maria Hildegard Geissenberger, daughter of Dr. jur. Hans Geissenberger. His first marriage ended in divorce on 13 July 1925. On 22 September 1934, he married Thekla Neminar, daughter of book merchant Maximilian Franz Neminar, who was 5 years his junior. His daughter Margit Rodenburg was born on 4 February 1937.

== Dates of Rank ==
- 1915-09-11 2nd Lieutenant
- 1918-06-20 1st Lieutenant
- 1927-02-01 Captain
- 1934-10-01 Major
- 1937-04-01 Lieutenant-Colonel
- 1940-04-01 Colonel
- 1942-04-01 Major-General
- 1942-12-01 Lieutenant-General

== Service and Commands held ==
- 1935-10-15 – 1938-11-10 Commanding Officer 2nd Battalion, 12th Infantry Regiment
- 1938-11-10 – 1940-01-03 Chief Instructor at the Infantry School, Döberitz
- 1940-01-03 – 1942-01-26 Commanding Officer 203rd Infantry Regiment [France - Poland - Romania]
- 1942-01-26 – 1942-04-01 Acting General Officer Commanding 76th Infantry Division [Eastern Front]
- 1942-04-01 – 1943-01-31 General Officer Commanding 76th Infantry Division [Eastern Front]
- 1943-01-31 – 1955-01-10 Prisoner of War, Soviet Captivity
- 1955-01-10 - Released

== Awards and decorations ==
- Iron Cross (1914) 2nd Class (25 April 1915) & 1st Class (15 May 1917)
- Knight's Cross Second Class of the Order of the Zähringer Lion with Swords
- Honour Cross of the World War 1914/1918 1934
- Clasp to the Iron Cross (1939) 2nd Class (17 May 1940) & 1st Class (25 May 1940)
- Eastern Medal
- German Cross in Gold on 7 March 1942 as Oberst in Infanterie-Regiment 203
- Knight's Cross of the Iron Cross with Oak Leaves
  - Knight's Cross on 8 October 1942 as Generalmajor and commander of the 76. Infantry-Division
  - 189th Oak Leaves on 31 January 1943 as Generalmajor and commander of the 76. Infantry-Division

Military offices
Preceded by General der Artillerie Maximilian de Angelis	Commander of 76. Infanterie-Division; 26 January 1942 – 31 January 1943	Succeeded by General der Infanterie Erich Abraham
