= 76th Infantry Division (Wehrmacht) =

- 76. Infanterie-Division
- Active: 26 August 1939 –1945
- Country: Nazi Germany
- Branch: Army
- Type: Infantry
- Size: Division
- Engagements: World War II: Odessa Offensive

The 76th Infantry Division was created on 26 August 1939 together with the 23rd Infantry Division in Potsdam.

== History ==
The division was annihilated in the Battle of Stalingrad and reformed by the OB West on 17 February 1943.

In 1944, the 76th ID was involved in heavy fighting with Soviet troops in Ukraine and eastern Romania.
In the defensive battles for Letcani and Iaşi (German: Jassy) the 76th ID suffered heavy losses and had to withdraw across the Bahlui River.
In September and October 1944, the 76th ID was again refreshed with new troops before surrendering in 1945 in Slovakia.

== Organization ==
Structure of the division:

- Headquarters
- 178th Infantry Regiment
- 203rd Infantry Regiment
- 230th Infantry Regiment
- 176th Artillery Regiment
- 176th Reconnaissance Battalion
- 176th Anti-Tank Battalion
- 176th Engineer Battalion
- 176th Signal Battalion
- 176th Divisional Supply Group

== Commanding officers ==
- General der Artillerie Maximilian de Angelis, 1 September 1939
- Generalleutnant Carl Rodenburg, 26 January 1942 – 31 January 1943, POW

=== Second formation ===
- General der Infanterie Erich Abraham, 1 April 1943
- Generalleutnant Otto-Hermann Brücker, July 1944
- General der Infanterie Erich Abraham, August 1944
- Generalleutnant Siegfried von Rekowski, 17 October 1944
- Oberst Dr. Wilhelm-Moritz Freiherr von Bissing, 8 February 1945
- Generalmajor Erhard-Heinrich Berner, 14 February 1945
