= Erich Abraham =

WW2 German Army general (1895-1971)

- Born: 27 March 1895; Marienburg, German Empire
- Died: 7 March 1971 (aged 75); Wiesbaden, West Germany
- Burial place: South Cemetery Wiesbaden
- Military career
- Allegiance: German Empire; Weimar Republic; Nazi Germany
- Branch: German Army
- Service years: 1914–1945
- Rank: General der Infanterie
- Commands: 76th Infantry Division; LXIII Army Corps
- Conflicts: World War I World War II
- Awards: Knight's Cross of the Iron Cross with Oak Leaves

Erich Abraham (27 March 1895 – 7 March 1971) was a general in the Wehrmacht of Nazi Germany who commanded the 76th Infantry Division then the LXIII Corps on the Western Front during World War II. He was also a recipient of the Knight's Cross of the Iron Cross with Oak Leaves.

== Biography ==
Abraham was born in Marienburg, East Prussia in 1895. He volunteered for military service after the outbreak of World War I and the following year was commissioned as a Leutnant der Reserve. He was demobilised in 1920 as an honorary Oberleutnant, and joined the police. He returned to military service in 1935 in the rank of Major. He commanded an infantry battalion in the 105th Infantry Regiment in 1936–39, being promoted to Oberstleutnant in 1938. In 1939, he was transferred to the 266th Infantry Regiment, again commanding a battalion for a year. In 1940 he was appointed as the commanding officer of the 230th Infantry Regiment, and in 1941 was promoted to Oberst, continuing in command of that regiment until 1942. During his time in command of the 230th Infantry Regiment, he was awarded the Knight's Cross of the Iron Cross.

On 17 February 1943, he was appointed to command the 76th Infantry Division which was being rebuilt in France after the original division had been destroyed at Stalingrad. He was promoted to Generalmajor on 1 June 1943, after which he led the division initially to Italy before being moved to Army Group South on the Eastern Front during the winter of 1943–44. On 1 January 1944, Abraham was promoted to Generalleutnant. He continued to command the division in heavy fighting and during the withdrawal in the face of the Red Army Dnieper–Carpathian Offensive, and other than for a short time in July–August, commanded the division until October 1944. While commanding the division, he was awarded the Oak Leaves to his Knight's Cross of the Iron Cross. Later that year, he was appointed to command LXIII Corps. In March 1945, he was promoted to General der Infanterie. Captured at the end of the war, he was released in August 1947. After release he lived in Wiesbaden, West Germany. He died in 1971.

== Awards ==
- Iron Cross (1914) 2nd Class (2 September 1915) & 1st Class (27 June 1917)
- Austrian Military Merit Cross 3rd Class with War Decoration (20 March 1917)
- Honour Cross of the World War 1914/1918 (1 December 1934)
- Wehrmacht Long Service Award 2nd Class (2 October 1936)
- Clasp to the Iron Cross (1939) 2nd Class (10 March 1940) & 1st Class (21 June 1940)
- Grand Cross of the Order of the Crown (Romania, 22 June 1942)
- Infantry Assault Badge (13 November 1942)
- German Cross in Gold on 7 March 1942 as Oberst and commander of Infanterie-Regiment 230
- Knight's Cross of the Iron Cross with Oak Leaves
  - Knight's Cross on 13 November 1942 as Oberst and commander of Infanterie-Regiment 230
  - 516th Oak Leaves on 26 June 1944 as Generalleutnant and commander of the 76. Infanterie-Division

Military offices
Preceded by Generalleutnant Carl Rodenburg	Commander of 76. Infanterie-Division; April 1, 1943 – July, 1944	Succeeded by Generalleutnant Otto-Hermann Brücker
Preceded by Generalleutnant Otto-Hermann Brücker	Commander of 76. Infanterie-Division; August, 1944 – 17 October 1944	Succeeded by Generalleutnant Siegfried von Rekowski
Preceded by General der Infanterie Friedrich-August Schack	Commander of LXIII. Armeekorps; 13 December 1944 - 8 May 1945	Succeeded by None
