= Joachim Degener =

German general

- Born: 28 November 1893; Metz, Imperial Territory of Alsace–Lorraine, German Empire
- Died: 7 September 1953 (aged 59); Würzburg, Bavaria, West Germany
- Relatives: ∞ 1923 Elise Sprengel; two children
- Military career
- Allegiance: German Empire (to 1918) (Germany) Weimar Republic (to 1933) (Nazi Germany) German Reich
- Branch: Prussian Army; Imperial German Army; Reichswehr; German Army (Wehrmacht)
- Service years: 1912–1945
- Rank: Generalmajor
- Conflicts: World War II; World War I
- Awards: Iron Cross; War Merit Cross (Brunswick); Hindenburg Cross; War Merit Cross
- Other work: Author

Joachim Karl Hermann Felix Degener (28 November 1893 – 7 September 1953) was a German professional soldier. He served his country as a junior officer in World War I, a staff officer in the inter-war period and a brigade-level commander during World War II.

== Life ==
Joachim Degener, son of dragoon officer and retired Colonel Alfred Degener, joined the Braunschweigisches Husaren-Regiment Nr. 17 straight from school (after Abitur) on 20 September 1912, and in the First World War, he was an Oberleutnant (First Lieutenant). He served in the Field in the 4th Squadron, then in the 13th Hussar-Regiment, and eventually again in the 17th Hussar-Regiment.

Oberst at the beginning of the Second World War, he assumed command of the 5th Rifle-Brigade until 1941. He was nominated commander of Würzburg from February 1941 to April 1944.

First detached to Army Group North Ukraine as Commandant of the Strongpoint Position of Kovel in April 1944, he was detached to the Military-Commander of France soon after. Joachim Degener was nominated Field-Commandant in Perpignan on July 1944. Leader of the Battle-Group "Degener", he assumed command of the 189th Infantry-Division from October to December 1944. Then, Degener fought in Hungary.

In charge of road block construction in Austria, Degener was captured by Major General Stanley Eric Reinhart's 261st Infantry Regiment. Degener was released on 22 May 1948.

== Promotions ==
- Fahnenjunker (20 September 1912)
- Fahnenjunker-Unteroffizier (5 April 1913)
- Fähnrich (16 June 1913)
- Leutnant (22 March 1914 with Patent from 23 March 1912)
- Oberleutnant (20 May 1917)
- Rittmeister (1 February 1925)
- Major (1 April 1934)
- Oberstleutnant (1 August 1936)
- Oberst (1 April 1939)
- Generalmajor (1 November 1942)

== Awards and decorations ==
- Iron Cross (1914), 2nd and 1st Class
  - 2nd Class on 29 October 1914
  - 1st Class on 24 October 1918
- War Merit Cross (Brunswick), 2nd Class (BrK2) on 3 February 1915
- Hindenburg Cross with Swords on 20 December 1934
- Wehrmacht Long Service Award, 4th to 1st Class
  - 2nd Class on 2 October 1936
  - 1st Class in 1937
- Repetition Clasp 1939 to the Iron Cross 1914, 2nd and 1st Class
  - 2nd Class on 18 September 1939
  - 1st Class on 27 October 1939
- War Merit Cross (1939), 2nd Class with Swords on 20 April 1943

== Works ==
- Greiner, Heinz, Joachim Degener: Aufgabenstellung und Übungsleitung mit praktischen Beispielen, Berlin: Mittler, 1938.
- Greiner, Heinz, Joachim Degener: Gefechtsführung und Kampftechnik, Berlin: Mittler, 1937.

Military offices
Preceded by Generalmajor Ernst von Bauer	Commander of 189. Infanterie-Division; 27 October 1944 – 15 November 1944	Succeeded by Generalmajor Eduard Zorn
