= Egon von Neindorff =

WW2 German army general (1892-1944)

- Egon von Neindorff, 1944
- Born: 12 September 1892; Koblenz, Germany
- Died: 15 April 1944 (aged 51); Tarnopol, Soviet Union
- Relatives: Egon von Neindorff (son)
- Military career
- Allegiance: German Empire; Weimar Republic; Nazi Germany
- Branch: Army (Wehrmacht)
- Rank: Generalmajor
- Commands: 216th Infantry Division
- Conflicts: World War II
- Awards: Knight's Cross of the Iron Cross with Oak Leaves

Egon von Neindorff (12 September 1892 – 15 April 1944) was a German general during World War II. He was a recipient of the Knight's Cross of the Iron Cross with Oak Leaves of Nazi Germany.

== World War II ==
On 1 July 1942 Neindorff took command of Fortress Brigade 1 in Crete. From September 1942 he commanded the 189th Reserve Division, and on 1 December 1942 was promoted to major-general. On 1 May 1943 Neindorff became commander of the 356th Infantry Division in Toulon, on 5 October 1943 he took over command of the 216th Infantry Division in Orel, on 20 October 1943 he commanded the 137th Infantry Division in Gomel, and from 16 December 1943 the 6th Infantry Division south of Gomel. From 17 January 1944 Neindorff led the 36th Infantry Division in Bobruisk.

On 22 January 1944 he became commander of the German garrison at Tarnopol. In March–April 1944, it was encircled by Soviet forces. Hitler had declared Tarnopol a fortified strong point, to be held to the last man. A German relief attempt was mounted on 11 April, but fell short of its goal. Neindorff was killed in action on 15 April; organized resistance quickly collapsed. The garrison of about 4,600 was lost with only 55 men reaching German lines the next day.

== Awards and decorations ==
- Iron Cross (1914)
  - 2nd Class
  - 1st Class
- Clasp to the Iron Cross (1939) 1st Class (2 April 1944)
- Knight's Cross of the Iron Cross with Oak Leaves
  - Knight's Cross on 4 April 1944 as Generalmajor and commander of the garrison at Tarnopol
  - Oak Leaves on 17 April 1944 as Generalmajor and combat commander of Tarnopol

Military offices
Preceded by none	Commander of 189th Infantry Division; 6 December 1942 – 1 May 1943	Succeeded by Generalmajor Ernst von Bauer
Preceded by General der Infanterie Friedrich August Schack	Commander of 216th Infantry Division; 3 October 1943 – 20 October 1943	Succeeded by Generalmajor Gustav Gihr
Preceded by Generalmajor Horst Kadgien	Commander of 36th Infantry Division; 17 January 1944 – 19 January 1944	Succeeded by Generalmajor Alexander Conrady
