= 216th Infantry Division (Wehrmacht) =

- 216. Infanterie-Division
- Divisional insignia
- Active: 26 August 1939 – 17 November 1943
- Country: Nazi Germany
- Branch: Army
- Type: 3rd Mobilization Wave Infantry Division (Infanterie-Division "Alter Art")
- Size: Nine Battalions, 17,200 men total
- Engagements: Defense of the Westwall 1939 – 1940; Invasion of Holland June 1940; Atlantic Coast Defense July 1940 – December 1941; Eastern Front December 1941 – November 1943 Briansk Yuchnov Rzhev Orel Spas-Demensk Battle of Kursk Gomel Retreat to the Dnieper River Line

The 216th Infantry Division (German: 216. Infanterie-Division) was a German Army division that was created during the Second World War; it was active from 1939–1943. It served on the Western Front in 1940 and later took part in the Eastern Front campaign, being involved in the disastrous Battle of Kursk.

== Operational history ==
The division was created on 26 August 1939 by reorganizing several Border Defense and Army Reserve units from Lower Saxony, primarily in the area surrounding the city of Hannover. It was organized under the pre-war infantry division "alter Art," structure; consisting of three 3-battalion infantry regiments (brigades), an artillery regiment of four battalions, a combat engineer battalion, a signal battalion, and an antitank battalion, as well as divisional services. Its total strength was approximately 17,200 men. The division was based at Hameln and was part of Wehrkreis XI.

The 216th Infantry Division did not participate in the Invasion of Poland, since it was occupying defensive positions in the Ardennes Forest along the 'Westwall'. It did take part in the invasion of the Low Countries and France in May and June 1940. When Operation Barbarossa, the invasion of the Soviet Union, began on June 22, 1941, the Division was performing occupation duties in France along the English Channel coast.

Following the success of the Soviet winter counteroffensive of December 1941, the Division was rushed to the Eastern Front as reinforcement and was soon split into several smaller battlegroups urgently needed for defending key localities. One of these battlegroups, formed from the 348th Infantry Regiment, was surrounded by the Soviet 10th Army in January 1942, outside of the town of Sukhinitchi. The regiment managed to hold out for several weeks until relief forces of the XXIV Panzer Corps broke through to the beleaguered troops on January 24, 1942.

There followed over a year of positional warfare in Army Group Center, where the division took part in battles at Rshev, Briansk, Orel, Spass Demensk and Gomel. In July 1943, the 216th Infantry Division participated in the Battle of Kursk, where it sustained heavy casualties while fighting on the northern shoulder of the Kursk salient as part of Generalfeldmarschall Model's Ninth Army.

The division was disbanded on 17 November 1943 after suffering heavy casualties during the retreat to the Dnieper River Defensive Line. The division's staff, most of the 348th Grenadier Regiment, the Artillery Regiment, the Combat Engineer Battalion and supply units were moved to Belgium, where they were used to form the framework for the new 272nd Infantry Division. Most of the surviving combat troops remained behind in the Soviet Union and were grouped into Divisions-Group 216, formed on 12 November 1943 and assigned to the 102nd Infantry Division.

== Commanding officers ==
- Lieutenant General Hermann Böttcher 26 August 1939
- Lieutenant General Kurt Himer 8 September 1940
- General of the Infantry Werner Freiherr von und zu Gilsa, 1 April 1941
- General of the Infantry Friedrich August Schack, 7 May 1943
- Lieutenant General Egon von Neindorff, 3 October 1943
- Major General Gustav Gihr, 20 October 1943

== Order of battle ==
- Division Headquarters
- 348th Infantry Regiment
- 396th Infantry Regiment
- 398th Infantry Regiment
- 216th Artillery Regiment
- Panzerabwehr/Schnelle Abteilung 216
- Pionier (Combat Engineer) Battalion 216
- Infantrie-Nachrichten Abteilung 216
- Infantrie-Division Nachschubfuehrer 216
- Feldersatz Battalion 216

== See also ==
- Division (military), Military unit, List of German divisions in World War II
- Army, Wehrmacht
- 272nd Infantry Division
- 272nd Volksgrenadier Division
