= Ewald Burian =

German officer and Knight's Cross recipient (1896–1981)

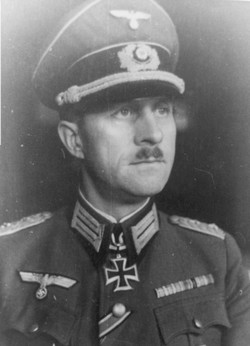
- Born: 12 July 1896; Czernowitz, Duchy of Bukovina, Austria-Hungary
- Died: 3 November 1981 (aged 85); Cologne
- Military career
- Allegiance: Austria-Hungary (to 1918); Romania (to 1940); Nazi Germany
- Branch: Army
- Service years: 1913–45
- Rank: Oberst
- Conflicts: World War II
- Awards: Knight's Cross of the Iron Cross

Ewald Burian (12 July 1896 – 3 November 1981) was a highly decorated Oberst in the Wehrmacht during World War II. He was also a recipient of the Knight's Cross of the Iron Cross.

== Awards and decorations ==
- Honour Cross of the World War 1914/1918
- Iron Cross (1939)
  - 2nd Class (1 April 1942)
  - 1st Class (1 August 1942)
- Infantry Assault Badge (3 June 1942)
- Eastern Front Medal (21 July 1942)
- German Cross in Gold (21 October 1943)
- Knight's Cross of the Iron Cross on 4 October 1944 as Oberst and commander of Grenadier-Regiment 980
