= Friedrich-August Schack =

German general (1892–1968)

Friedrich August Schack
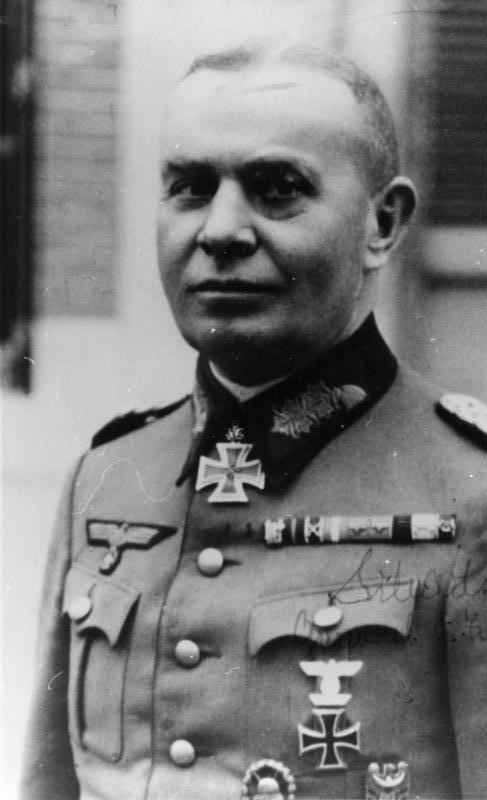
- Born: 27 March 1892; Schmiedeberg (now Kowary)
- Died: 24 July 1968 (aged 76); Goslar
- Military career
- Allegiance: German Empire; Weimar Republic; Nazi Germany
- Branch: German Army
- Rank: General der Infanterie
- Commands: 216th Infantry Division; 272nd Infantry Division; LXXXI Army Corps; XXXII Army Corps
- Conflicts: World War I World War II
- Awards: Knight's Cross of the Iron Cross with Oak Leaves

Friedrich August Schack (27 March 1892 – 24 July 1968) was a German general during World War II. He is best known for his pyrrhic defense of Caen after the allied invasion, September 1944, and for his brief leadership of the LXXXI Army Corps defending Aachen and the Siegfried Line.

== Career ==
Schack enlisted in the army, 6 August 1914 and fought in World War I. After the war he was retained in the Reichsheer where he served in junior officer roles. In 1934, Schack was appointed tactics teacher in the war college in Dresden. In 1937, he reached the rank of lieutenant colonel.

Schack took part in the invasion of Poland and Operation Barbarossa, the invasion of the Soviet Union. On 1 October 1942 he became commander of the war College in Potsdam. On 7 May 1943 he became commander of the 216th Infantry-Division. On 1 July 1943 Schack was promoted to major general and commander of the 216th Infantry division. Schack led his division in bloody combat in Orel, July 1943, during the Battle of Kursk, and suffered heavy losses.

Some of the surviving soldiers were sent to Belgium, where they became the 272nd Infantry-Division. On 15 December 1943 Schack was appointed commander of the division. As such he was promoted, 1 January 1944, to lieutenant general. For leading his division during the defense of Caen after D Day, Schack was awarded, 21 September 1944, the Knight's Cross of the Iron Cross with Oak Leaves. However, Schack had sustained heavy losses during the battle and was suffering severe combat fatigue.

On 4 September 1944 Schack became leader of the LXXXI Army corps, five badly mauled divisions, charged with defending Aachen and the Siegfried Line. Schack's superiors became dissatisfied with his performance and replaced him with General Friedrich Köchling. Beginning 15 November 1944 Schack led the LXXXV army corps in southern France and the Ardennes for one month.

On 26 March 1945 Schack was assigned to lead the XXXII Army Corps, on the Oder near Stettin. On 20 April 1945 Schack was promoted to General of Infantry and commanding general of the XXXII Army corps. At war's end the Allies imprisoned him. They released him 24 March 1948.

== Awards and decorations ==
- Iron Cross (1914) 2nd Class (22 March 1916) & 1st Class (29 March 1918)
- Clasp to the Iron Cross (1939) 2nd Class (10 October 1939) & 1st Class (25 June 1940)
- Knight's Cross of the Iron Cross with Oak Leaves
  - Knight's Cross on 24 July 1941 as Oberst and commander of Infanterie-Regiment 392
  - Oak Leaves on 21 September 1944 as Generalleutnant and commander of 272. Infanterie-Division

== Bibliography ==
=== Bibliography ===
- Lehrer, Steven (2002). Hitler Sites: A City-by-city Guidebook (Austria, Germany, France, United States). McFarland. p. 224. ISBN 0-7864-1045-0.
- Scherzer, Veit (2007). Die Ritterkreuzträger 1939–1945 Die Inhaber des Ritterkreuzes des Eisernen Kreuzes 1939 von Heer, Luftwaffe, Kriegsmarine, Waffen-SS, Volkssturm sowie mit Deutschland verbündeter Streitkräfte nach den Unterlagen des Bundesarchives [The Knight's Cross Bearers 1939–1945 The Holders of the Knight's Cross of the Iron Cross 1939 by Army, Air Force, Navy, Waffen-SS, Volkssturm and Allied Forces with Germany According to the Documents of the Federal Archives] (in German). Jena, Germany: Scherzers Militaer-Verlag. ISBN 978-3-938845-17-2.
- Thomas, Franz (1998). Die Eichenlaubträger 1939–1945 Band 2: L–Z [The Oak Leaves Bearers 1939–1945 Volume 2: L–Z] (in German). Osnabrück, Germany: Biblio-Verlag. ISBN 978-3-7648-2300-9.

Military offices
Preceded by General der Infanterie Werner Freiherr von und zu Gilsa	Commander of 216. Infanterie-Division; 7 May 1943 – 3 October 1943	Succeeded by Generalleutnant Egon von Neindorff
Preceded by General der Infanterie Hans Petri	Commander of 272. Infanterie-Division; 15 December 1943 – August 1944	Succeeded by none
Preceded by General der Infanterie Otto Sponheimer	Commander of LXVII. Armeekorps; 25 October 1944 – 28 October 1944	Succeeded by General der Infanterie Carl Püchler
Preceded by General der Panzertruppen Adolf Kuntzen	Commander of LXXXI. Armeekorps; 4 September 1944 – 20 September 1944	Succeeded by General der Infanterie Friedrich Köchling
Preceded by General der Infanterie Baptist Knieß	Commander of LXXXV. Armeekorps; 15 November 1944 – 16 December 1944	Succeeded by General der Infanterie Baptist Knieß
Preceded by General der Infanterie Gustav Höhne	Commander of LXIII. Armeekorps; 24 November 1944 – 13 December 1944	Succeeded by Generalleutnant Erich Abraham
Preceded by none	Commander of XXXII. Armeekorps; 26 March 1945 – 8 May 1945	Succeeded by none
