= 189th Infantry Division (Wehrmacht) =

- 189. Infanterie-Division
- Active: September 1942 – March 1945
- Country: Nazi Germany
- Branch: Army
- Type: Infantry
- Size: Division
- Engagements: World War II: Operation Dragoon

The 189th Infantry Division was a reserve division of the German Army in World War II.

== Operational history ==
- September 26, 1942: Formation of the 189. Reserve-Division
- December 6, 1942: The 189. Reserve-Division is renamed 189. Infanterie-Division (B)
- May 15, 1943: The 189. Reserve-Division is reformed in France from Division Nr. 189. In 1944, it fought against the Allied landings in Operation Dragoon in the South of France and suffered heavy losses.
- October 8, 1944: The 189. Infanterie-Division was reformed in France from the 189. Reserve-Division and the 242. Infanterie-Division.
- February 1945: The 189. Infantry-Division is destroyed in the Colmar Pocket.
- March 1945: The 189. Infantry-Division was reformed again and fought in southern Germany until the end of the war.

== Order of battle ==
1944

- 15th Reserve Grenadier Regiment (two battalions)
- 28th Reserve Grenadier Regiment (three battalions)
- 28th Reserve Artillery Battalion
- 9th Reserve Pioneer Battalion
- 1089th Administrative Service Unit

1945

- 1007th Security Battalion
- 1021st Security Battalion
- 1181st Artillery Battalion
- 806th SS-Machinegun Battalion

== Commanders ==
- Major General Paul Bauer (October 1939 - June 1942)
- Major General Egon von Neindorff (June 1942 - October 1943)
- Lieutenant General Richard von Schwerin (October 1943 - September 1944)
- Major General Ernst von Bauer (September - October 1944)
- Major General Joachim Degener (October - November 1944)
- Colonel Eduard Zorn (November 1944 - February 1945), KIA
- Colonel Mellwig (February - April 1945)
