= West Wall Medal =

WW2 German military and civilian decoration

West Wall Medal Deutsches Schutzwall-Ehrenzeichen
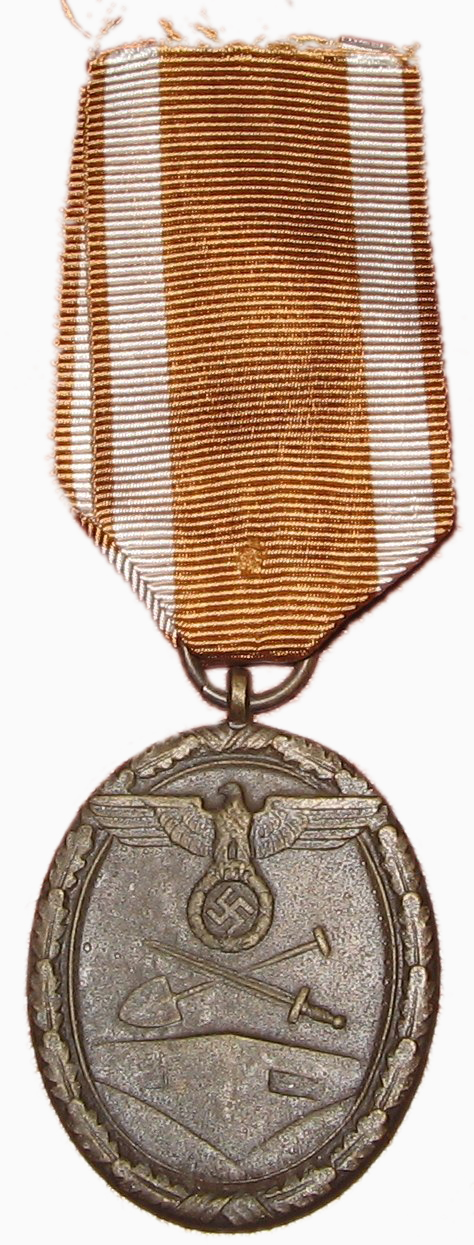
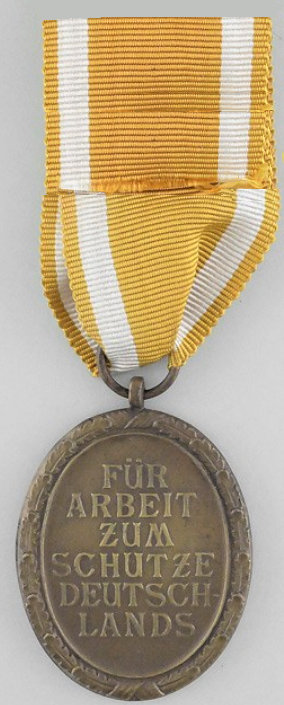
- West Wall Medal, obverse and reverse
- Type: Medal
- Presented by: Nazi Germany
- Eligibility: Military and civilian personnel
- Status: Defunct
- Established: 2 August 1939

Highlights
- Total: 800,000

The West Wall Medal (German: Deutsches Schutzwall-Ehrenzeichen) was a decoration of Nazi Germany. It was instituted on 2 August 1939 and was given to those who designed and built the fortifications on Germany's western borders, known as the Westwall or, in English, the Siegfried Line, between 15 June 1938 to 31 March 1939. On 13 November 1939 eligibility was extended to include servicemen of the Wehrmacht who served on the Westwall for at least ten weeks. In all 622,064 medals were awarded until 31 January 1941, when awards of the medal ceased.

In 1944, after the allied invasion, the medal was re-instituted and awarded to those who renovated and strengthened the fortifications on the western borders. This version of the medal was commonly known as the "Defence Wall Honor Award", to distinguish the decoration from its 1939 counterpart.

It was awarded to over 800,000 men in total by the end of the war.

== Background ==
The original proposal, in January 1939, had been for the award of a non-wearable medallion bearing the obverse inscription: "Dem Arbeiter zur Ehr; Der Heimat zur Wehr" (To the Worker, Honor; The Homeland, Defense) with the recipient's name engraved on the reverse. This version was never issued.

After the outbreak of war in 1939, Fritz Todt, founder of the Organization Todt which helped build the wall, claimed that the medal could be worn with "the same right and the same pride" as military decorations such as the Iron Cross. However, in view of the large numbers awarded, many recipients disparagingly referred to it as the 'Order of Clay' (Lehmorden).

== Description ==
The medal was awarded in one class. It was struck in bronze. Its oval shape featured on the obverse (from bottom to top) a bunker, a crossed sword and shovel, and the German Eagle. The reverse bore the inscription "Für Arbeit zum Schutze Deutschlands" (For Work in the Defence of Germany). Both sides of the medal were edged with a wreath of oak leaves. The medal was designed by Professor Richard Klein of Munich.

The ribbon is golden brown with a white stripe towards each edge.

On 10 October 1944 a second production run was authorized to reward the workers and military personnel strengthening the Siegfried line. This version of the medal was made of a bronzed zinc. A bar with the date "1944" was authorized for those who already held the 1939 version, but it was never mass-produced.
