= Otto-Hermann Brücker =

German general (1899–1964)

Otto-Hermann Adolf Brücker
- Born: 17 October 1899
- Died: 12 December 1964 (aged 65)
- Military career
- Allegiance: Nazi Germany
- Branch: Army
- Rank: Generalleutnant
- Commands: 9th Infantry Division; 76th Infantry Division; 6th Infantry Division
- Conflicts: World War II
- Awards: Knight's Cross of the Iron Cross

Otto-Hermann Adolf Brücker (17 October 1899 – 12 December 1964) was a German general during World War II who commanded several divisions. He was a recipient of the Knight's Cross of the Iron Cross.

== Awards and decorations ==
- Knight's Cross of the Iron Cross on 14 April 1945 as Generalmajor and commander of 6. Volksgrenadier-Division
