= 6th Infantry Division (Wehrmacht) =

Coordinates: 52°01′03″N 8°31′29″E

- German: 6. Infanterie-Division
- Unit insignia
- Active: October 1934 – 25 July 1944; 10 March – 8 May 1945
- Country: Nazi Germany
- Branch: German Army
- Type: Infantry
- Size: Division
- Garrison/HQ: Bielefeld
- Nickname: Westphalian Division

The 6th Infantry Division (6. Infanterie-Division) was a unit of the German Army during World War II.

== History ==
=== 6th Infantry Division ===
Formed in October 1934 from the cover formation "Infanterieführer VI" in Bielefeld, the 6th Infantry Division was mobilized on 26 August 1939 for the upcoming Invasion of Poland. The division consisted of three infantry regiments (18 (Bielefeld), 37 (Osnabrück), 58 (Herford)), Artillery Regiment 6 (further supported by I./42 Artillery Detachment) and Division Units 6.

In January 1940, the division's field replacement battalion became I./362 of 196th Infantry Division, followed by the exit in February 1940 of II./37 battalion to become III./5033 of 290th Infantry Division. II./37 was subsequently replenished and the 6th Division brought back up to strength.

In December 1940, a third of the division was transferred away: the 18th Regiment staff and the battalions III./18, III./37, III./58 joined the 106th Infantry Division.

Following a directive by OKH on 15 October 1942, every single infantry regiment in the German army was redesignated as a "Grenadier Regiment". The three regiments of the 6th Infantry Division were renamed accordingly (although all divisions' names remained unchanged). As a result, the division was subsequently equipped with Grenadier Regiment 18, Grenadier Regiment 37 and Grenadier Regiment 58, but no functional change in organization had taken place compared to the earlier "Infantry Regiments".

On 2 October 1943, the division was reformed into an Infanterie-Division neuer Art-style division, leading to a reduction in size for each regiment to account for wartime losses. The battalions III./18, III./37 and II./58 had already been dissolved over the course of the war years 1942 and 1943 due to mounting casualties. The new Division Fusilier Battalion 6 (which was required by the organization style) was formed from the division's pre-existing reconnaissance detachment. This left the division with three grenadier regiments of two battalions each, one division fusilier battalion, an artillery regiment with four detachments and the Division Units 6 for support.

During the Soviet Operation Bagration (June 1944), the 6th Infantry Division was encircled and annihilated. It was officially dissolved on 18 July 1944.

=== 6th Grenadier Division ===
On 25 July 1944, the 6th Grenadier Division was created from the 552nd Grenadier Division, a division of the 29th wave then still in assembly at Sennelager. The remnants of the 6th Infantry Division destroyed in June were added to the components of the 552nd Grenadier Division. The division contained the Grenadier Regiments 18, 37 and 58, as well as the Artillery Regiment 6 and Division Units 6 (thus reusing the same regimental numbers as had been used in the original 6th Infantry Division).

On 9 October 1944, the 6th Grenadier Division was renamed 6th Volksgrenadier Division.

=== 6th Volksgrenadier Division ===
On 9 October 1944, the 6th Volksgrenadier Division came into existence when the 6th Grenadier Division was renamed.

On 1 January 1945, the 6th Volksgrenadier Division, then under the 9th Army of Army Group A, had a strength of 9,436 men.

The division was destroyed during the Soviet Vistula–Oder Offensive in January 1945 and reestablished as 6. Infanterie-Division (10 March 1945) using elements of Shadow Division Dresden.

== Commanding officers ==
- General der Pioniere Walter Kuntze, 15 May 1935
- Generalleutnant Arnold Freiherr von Biegeleben, 1 March 1938
- Generalleutnant Helge Auleb, 14 October 1940
- Generalleutnant Horst Großmann, 25 January 1942
- Generalleutnant Egon von Neindorff, 16 December 1943
- Oberst Alexander Conrady, 12 January 1944
- Oberst Günther Klammt, 19 January 1944
- Generalleutnant Hans-Walter Heyne, 1 June 1944
- Generalleutnant Otto-Hermann Brücker, until 4 May 1945
- Generalmajor Friedrich-Wilhelm Liegmann, 4 May 1945

== Sources ==
=== Literature ===
- Großmann, Horst (1958). Geschichte der rheinisch-westfälischen 6. Infanterie-Division 1939–1945 [History of the Rhenish-Westphalian 6th Infantry Division 1939–1945] (in German). Bad Nauheim: Podzun.
- Tessin, Georg (1966). Die Landstreitkräfte 001–005. Verbände und Truppen der deutschen Wehrmacht und Waffen-SS im Zweiten Weltkrieg 1939–1945 (in German). Vol. 2. Frankfurt (Main): Verlag E. S. Mittler & Sohn GmbH. pp. 13–15.
