= Karl Strecker =

German general (1884–1973)

- Karl Strecker as General der Infanterie
- Born: 20 September 1884; Radmannsdorf, West Prussia, German Empire
- Died: 10 April 1973 (aged 88); Riezlern, Austria
- Military career
- Allegiance: German Empire; Weimar Republic; Nazi Germany
- Branch: Prussian Army; Reichswehr; German Army
- Service years: 1905–1920; 1935–1945
- Rank: General der Infanterie
- Commands: 79th Infantry Division; XVII Army Corps; XI Army Corps
- Conflicts: World War I; First Silesian Uprising; World War II; Battle of France; Operation Barbarossa; Battle of Stalingrad
- Awards: Knight's Cross of the Iron Cross
- Police career
- Department: Sicherheitspolizei
- Service years: 1920–1935
- Rank: Generalmajor

Karl Strecker (20 September 1884 – 10 April 1973) was a German general during World War II who commanded several army corps on the Eastern Front. A career military and police professional, he fought in World War I and then served in the paramilitary Security Police of the Weimar Republic. Strecker welcomed the rise of Hitler and found favor with the regime, earning rapid promotions in the armed forces of Nazi Germany, the Wehrmacht. Strecker commanded the German Army's XI Army Corps in the Battle of Stalingrad and was the last German general to surrender his command in the city. He spent twelve years in Soviet captivity before being released in 1955.

== Early life and World War I ==
He was born in Radmannsdorf, West Prussia to a Prussian Army officer. A lifelong and devoted evangelical Christian, Strecker wanted to follow in his grandfather's footsteps and become a priest but the financial hardship that followed his father's suicide forced him to instead attend a state-funded military school in Koeslin at the age of 12. Strecker began military training in a time of transition in the German Army. Historically the Prussian officer corps had been dominated by aristocratic Junkers, but Strecker was part of a new wave of middle-class Prussians who were beginning to dominate the Army's officer ranks. Despite feelings of isolation due to his middle-class background, he excelled academically, graduating with excellent marks in all subjects, including Russian. In 1905 he joined the 152nd Infantry Regiment of the 41st Division as a company commander and then battalion adjutant. In June 1914, one month before the start of the First World War, he was promoted to lieutenant and made the regimental adjutant. He was promoted quickly and served as both the battalion and regimental adjutant.

With the outbreak of the war, Strecker's division was part of XX Corps, in the 8th Army. He participated in the battles of Tannenberg and Masurian Lakes. The division was then transferred to the German 9th Army, arriving in the middle of October, and fought in the Battles of Vistula River and Łódź as part of 9th Army's XVI Corps. In February the division was transferred back to the 8th Army to participate in the counter-offensive into Russia where it was engaged in heavy fighting until May 1916. After a brief rest and refit Strecker and his unit where then sent south, to conduct operations in Romania. Just prior to his unit entering Bucharest in December Strecker, by then a Hauptmann, was transferred to the railway department of the German General Staff. Such assignments were normal for successful staff officers such as Strecker but he disliked the assignment, complaining to a friend from the regiment that he was unhappy and depressed in the impersonal and highly formal atmosphere of the General Staff.

Six months later, in May 1917, Strecker was reassigned to the artillery staff of the 52nd Infantry Division on the Western Front near Paris. Between May and September Strecker filled in a variety of roles within the division, including staff positions and the commander of the division's 111th Regiment. In this time Strecker fought at the Second Battle of the Aisne and, after another period of rest and refit, the Battle of La Malmaison. He briefly served in two other units before being seriously injured in an automobile accident. After recovering he returned to the front in a staff position in the 30th Division and as the deputy commander of the 121st Division in Belgium. He finally returned to his home unit, the 152nd Regiment, after the Armistice, this time as its commander. While back in Prussia he led the regiment on behalf of the Weimar Republic in the First Silesian uprising before being discharged from the Army. (Note: Haller and Mitcham differ on whether he was discharged in October of 1919 or January of 1920, respectively.)

== Interwar period and police service ==
Three months before his discharge from the radically downsized Reichswehr he was preemptively commissioned as a major in the police force of the Prussian Sicherheitspolizei, or Security Police. The new police forces were formed by the government in response to municipal police being unable to control street violence and the State's hesitation to rely on the paramilitary Freikorps. Additionally, the new security police forces constituted an active reserve, circumventing the restriction placed on the size of Germany's military by the Treaty of Versailles. His first posting was in Münster where he married Hedwig Bonn, the daughter of the mayor of Marienburg, having two children with her. Strecker openly held anti-democratic and anti-socialist political positions and had a contempt of the Weimar government, which fact he blamed for his lack of advancement.

Strecker was transferred to Berlin in 1927 to command one of the police districts in the city. In 1931 he was transferred back to Münster, eventually being promoted to lieutenant colonel and taking command of his old police academy there. Strecker worked with the SA to suppress left-wing demonstrations and was generally held in favor by the Nazi government, being quickly promoted to Majorgeneral and given command of the newly restructured Stettin police district in April 1934.

A supporter of the old Monarchist political order, Strecker welcomed the rise of Hitler. As the regime's abuses of power unfolded, Strecker began to develop reservations. According to a biography published by his grandson, Uli Haller, Strecker disapproved of the Nazi's anti-Jewish pogroms and the purges of 1934 but he viewed the ascent of the Nazis as not entirely unwelcome. He rejoined the Army as a Generalmajor in 1935. He stated to a friend: "My politics are these: wherever I am, I am with my whole heart. I am now a soldier, so my politics are obedience... Whatever is or may be, I accept the whole without reservation." As with many officers of senior rank being incorporated in the rapidly expanding Wehrmacht, Strecker was given a rapid series of commands below his nominal rank in order to quickly prepare him for larger combat commands. He was made deputy commander of the 34. Infanterie-Division (34th Infantry Division) in November 1938 and then given command of the 79. Infanterie-Division (79th Infantry Division), which was formed by expanding the 34th Division in the summer of 1939.

== World War II ==
Strecker's new division was a reserve unit and was assigned to the border with France during the invasion of Poland. Although the division's posting opposite the Maginot Line in Saarland was not as heavily active as other fronts, Strecker proved a capable combat commander during assaults on the Maginot's fortifications and the subsequent offensive toward Paris. He earned praise by his superiors, including Field Marshal Erwin von Witzleben, who called Strecker one of his best division commanders and recommended him as a corps commander. He was promoted to Generalleutnant in June 1940. He remained in France until early 1941 when his division was transferred to Austria and then to the Eastern Front to participate in Operation Barbarossa as part of the 6th Army in Army Group South.

Strecker led his division in the invasion of Ukraine, participating in the Battle of Kiev and the First Battle of Kharkov. He earned another recommendation to command a corps. In January 1942 he was diagnosed with heart arrhythmia and sent on convalescent leave for three months. He returned to active duty in April, taking temporary command of the 17th Army Corps in Army Group Centre and receiving a promotion to General of the Infantry. He commanded the corps in the Second Battle of Kharkov. The commander of Army Group South, Friedrich Paulus, was impressed with Strecker's performance at Kharkov and had him transferred to his 6th Army to take permanent command of the 11th Corps.

=== Stalingrad ===
After the 6th Army defeated the Soviet forces at the Second Battle of Kharkov it drove toward the city of Stalingrad. The 6th Army attacked Stalingrad directly with Strecker's 11th Corps protecting the northern flank, on the 6th Army's left. Strecker and other senior commanders in the 6th Army supported a strategic withdrawal to protect their flanks and take up better positions, but this was refused by Hitler. In November the Red Army attacked as part of Operation Uranus and within days Strecker and the rest of the Army were surrounded. Abandoning most of his heavy equipment, Strecker led his corps in a counterattack straight into the encircling forces in order to avoid being cut off from the rest of the 6th Army.

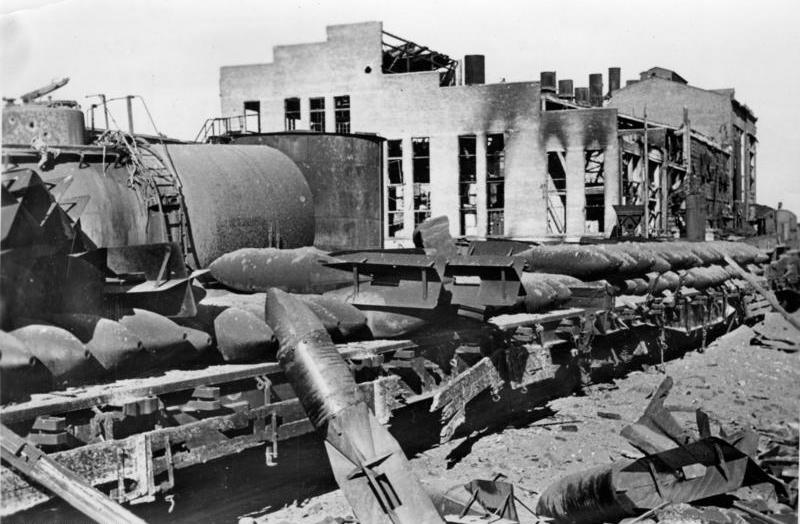
An armory outside the Tractor Plant used by Strecker as a makeshift HQ in the final days of the Battle of Stalingrad

By late January the strategic situation was hopeless and the 6th Army was starving. Strecker's positions had been largely isolated from the rest of the 6th Army, in the northern sector of Stalingrad. Strecker was determined to hold on as long as possible in order to provide any assistance he could to Erich von Manstein's other forces, although he refused to continue to fight exclusively for propaganda purposes and forbade his staff from committing suicide. In the final days of the battle Strecker worked to evacuate as many wounded as he could while trying to maintain a fighting formation. He issued an order to his officers in the final days of that month that any soldier seen breaking away from their unit and moving toward Soviet positions was to be shot and that any soldier caught taking airdropped supplies for himself or who disobeyed orders was to be immediately court-martialed. As a last-ditch effort to find a point where his corps could attempt a breakout, he authorized final reconnaissance of the Volga on 29 December but the entire west bank of the river was occupied by entrenched Soviet forces. On 1 February, having confirmed that Paulus and all other combat formations had surrendered, Strecker gathered his staff and told them that the military situation was hopeless and that all troops under his command had the freedom to act as their conscience saw fit. The next morning Strecker surrendered his 11th Corps to Soviet troops. When he and his chief of staff, Helmuth Groscurth, drafted the final transmission sent by the 6th Army at Stalingrad, telling the OKW that the XI Corps "had done its duty". Paulus later said that he received a radio transmission just prior to his surrender that promoted Strecker to Generaloberst and conferred this promotion on Strecker after the surrender but the transmission could not be substantiated after the war.

=== Surrender and captivity ===
After the surrender, Strecker and the rest of the general officers were transferred by train to Camp 27, near Krasnoyarsk, and then bused to a former cloister in Suzdal. Finally, in July, they were sent to Camp 48 in Voikovo, where Strecker remained for the next 12 years. Like most senior officers of the Wehrmacht, he received reasonable treatment. He was put before a show trial and sentenced to 25 years' imprisonment. Eventually, the senior officers housed at Camp 48 were allowed one 25-word postcard a month, although few ever arrived in 1943, due to Hitler's desire to maintain the fiction that all the generals had died defending their positions in Stalingrad. Although Strecker's family was made aware of his survival, he was not allowed to receive mail until 1947 due to his refusal to cooperate with his captors. Along with Carl Rodenburg, Hans-Heinrich Sixt von Armin, Walter Heitz, and the 6th Army's Chief of Staff Arthur Schmidt, he was part of the "anti-communist" faction of officers in his camp who refused to cooperate with the Soviets while confined. Strecker and the rest of the anti-communist group boycotted all contact with their fellow officers who joined the formation of the National Committee for a Free Germany and its spin-off, the League of German Officers (BDO) in 1943. Strecker was among a group of officers who maintained the BDO boycott throughout the war, although Paulus and a little more than half the other captive officers had joined by the end of 1944. A brief period of thaw occurred between the BDO and non-BDO Officer Corp in the wake of the failed 20 July plot. The assassination attempt on Hitler changed this for many of them. In December 1944, Strecker and 50 other officers at the camp signed a BDO authored proclamation calling upon Germany to depose Hitler and end the war. He and Rodenburg were in the last group of Germans to be released, in October 1955. After arriving back in West Germany he took an extended convalescence and retired to Idar-Oberstein where he wrote a memoir. In his later years he came to reject his anti-democratic views and expressed regret and personal shame at failing to oppose Hitler's regime. He lived out the remainder of his life in Riezlern, Austria, where he died in 1973.

== Awards and decorations ==
- German Cross in Gold (25 January 1943)
- Knight's Cross of the Iron Cross on 26 October 1941 as Generalleutnant and commander of 79. Infanterie-Division

== Published works ==
- Strecker, Karl (1915). Von Hannibal zu Hindenburg: Studien über Hindenburgs Strategie u. ihre Vorläufer m. Skizzen d. Schlachten bei Cannä, Kunersdorf, Sedan, Tannenberg, an d. Masurischen Seen [From Hannibal to Hindenburg: Studies on Hindenburg's Strategy & their precursors with Sketches of the Slaughter at Canna, Kunersdorf, Sedan, Tannenberg, Masurian lakes] (in German). Berlin: Curtius.
- Strecker, Karl (1933). Das Deutsch-Ordens-Infanterie-Regiment Nr 152 im Weltkriege: Nach d. amtl. u. privaten Kriegstagebüchern, Berichten, Feldpostbriefen u. Zuschriften [The German Infantry Regiment No. 152 in the World War: official and private war diaries, books, reports, field post mails and letters] (in German). Berlin-Charlottenburg: Bernard & Graefe. 362836647.

== Bibliography ==
- Adam, Wilhelm; Ruhle, Otto (2015). With Paulus at Stalingrad. Translated by Tony Le Tissier. Barnsley, U.K.: Pen and Sword. ISBN 9781473833869.
- Beevor, Antony (1999). Stalingrad: The Fateful Siege: 1942-1943. London, United Kingdom: Penguin. ISBN 9781101153567.
- Busch, Reinhold (2014). Survivors of Stalingrad: Eyewitness Accounts from the 6th Army, 1942–43. Barnsley, U.K.: Frontline Books. ISBN 9781848327665.
- Fellgiebel, Walther-Peer (2000) [1986]. Die Träger des Ritterkreuzes des Eisernen Kreuzes 1939–1945 — Die Inhaber der höchsten Auszeichnung des Zweiten Weltkrieges aller Wehrmachtteile [The Bearers of the Knight's Cross of the Iron Cross 1939–1945 — The Owners of the Highest Award of the Second World War of all Wehrmacht Branches] (in German). Friedberg, Germany: Podzun-Pallas. ISBN 978-3-7909-0284-6.
- Forczyk, Robert (2013). Kharkov 1942: The Wehrmacht strikes back. New York, New York: Bloomsbury Publishing. ISBN 9781780961590.
- Haller, Uli (1994). Lieutenant General Karl Strecker: the life and thought of a German military man. Santa Barbara, California: Praeger. ISBN 9780275945824.
- Hellbeck, Jochen (2015). Stalingrad: The City that Defeated the Third Reich. New York City, New York: PublicAffairs. ISBN 9781610394970.
- Lucas, James (2014). Hitler's Commanders: German Bravery in the Field, 1939–1945. Barnsley, U.K.: Frontline. ISBN 9781473815124.
- Mitcham, Samuel W.; Mueller, Gene (2012). Hitler's Commanders: Officers of the Wehrmacht, the Luftwaffe, the Kriegsmarine, and the Waffen-SS. Lanham, Maryland: Rowman & Littlefield. ISBN 9781442211544.
- Scherzer, Veit (2007). Die Ritterkreuzträger: 1939 – 1945; die Inhaber des Ritterkreuzes des Eisernen Kreuzes 1939 von Herr, Luftwaffe, Kriegsmarine, Waffen-SS, Volkssturm sowie mit Deutschland verbündeter Streitkräfte nach den Unterlagen des Bundesarchivs [The Knight Cross Carriers : 1939 - 1945; the owners of the Knights Cross of the Iron Cross in 1939 by Herr, Luftwaffe, Kriegsmarine, Waffen-SS, Volkssturm, and allied forces of Germany, according to the documents of the Bundesarchiv] (in German). Vol. 1993 and 1994. Jena, Germany: Scherzers Militaer-Verlag. ISBN 978-3-938845-17-2.

Military offices
Preceded by None	Commander of 79. Infanterie-Division	Succeeded by Generalleutnant Richard Graf von Schwerin
Preceded by General der Infanterie Karl-Adolf Hollidt	Commander of XVII. Armeekorps	Succeeded by General der Infanterie Karl-Adolf Hollidt
Preceded by General der Infanterie Joachim von Kortzfleisch	Commander of XI. Armeekorps	Succeeded by Unit surrendered at Stalingrad
