= 79th Infantry Division (Wehrmacht) =

- 79. Infanterie-Division
- Divisional insignia of 79th Infantry
- Active: Raised March 1939, March 1945
- Country: Nazi Germany
- Branch: Army
- Type: Infantry
- Size: Division
- Engagements: World War II

Commanders
- Notable commanders: Karl Strecker

The 79th Infantry Division (79. Infanterie-Division) was an infantry division of Nazi Germany's Wehrmacht during World War II.

== Operational history ==
The 79th Infantry Division began mobilization on March 1, 1939, as a part of the second German "wave" system of mobilization. The "wave" was the German designation for groups of infantry divisions raised at approximately the same time, with approximately the same type of organization, equipment, personnel and training. Raised from Rheinlanders in the German Military District (Wehrkreis) XII, and headquartered in Wiesbaden, the home station of the 79th was Koblenz. It was designated as a Division on August 26, 1939. Assigned to the French-German border in the Saar region, the 79th trained and worked on the West Wall. The Division saw action against the French on the Saar Front on May 10, 1940, when it was part of the invasion forces. In June, the division participated in attacks on the Maginot Line and the capture of Epinal. The Cross of Lorraine (Lothringer Kreuz) was designated as the symbol. Unteroffizier Werner Psaar stated that since the division's first combat was mainly in the Lorraine region, this is what led to the symbol. From June 1940 until April 1941, the division was on occupation duty and trained for Operation Sea Lion - the projected invasion of Great Britain. The 79th was relocated to Klagenfurt in April 1941 but was too late for the invasion of Yugoslavia.

On 16 June 1941, orders were issued by OKW for the 79th Infantry Division to be transported to the Eastern Front starting 22 June.

The Division was assigned to Army Group South for Operation Operation Barbarossa on June 26, 1941. From June 1941 until September 1942, the 79th fought in southern Russia.

=== Battle of Stalingrad ===
In October 1942 from positions in front of the Red Army bridgehead across the Don at Serafimovich to Stalingrad. This late weakening of the 6th Army's left flank to replace the serious infantry losses in the Stalingrad city battle contributed to the success of Operation Uranus, as Red Army's northern pincer axis of attack rolled through the 79th's former positions, which were given over to the Romanian 5th Infantry division.

The division began its attack on Stalingrad on October 17, 1942. The fighting in the Red October Tractor Factory was fiercely contended, hall by hall. When the Soviet Offensive started on November 19, 1942, the 79th was one of the units trapped in the "kessel" (or cauldron), when it was surrounded on November 24. The Sixth Army surrendered on January 31, 1943. The division staff, including the Ia (Operations Officer) Oberst Hans Schwanbeck, was flown out of Stalingrad on January 8–9, 1943. The division, including its commander, Generalleutnant Alexander von Daniels, surrendered to the Red Army when the German forces capitulated.

=== Reformation ===
The division was reformed from the remnants of other units outside of the Soviet encirclement on January 12, 1943. The division then took part in operations in the Novocherkassk area until relieved on March 13, 1943. It refitted in the Volnovakha area and in April 1943, returned to battle. It fought a number of defensive actions before reaching the Kuban bridgehead in August 1943. The division was evacuated to Ukraine retreating west with the rest of the German forces.

1944 found the 79th in Romania as a part of IV Korps, 6th Army. By August, the 79th was one of the divisions attempting to hold the city of Jassy. On August 23, 1944, with the Romanian coup, the 79th was once again encircled and virtually annihilated near Chitcani, Romania on the Berlad River. Less than 1,000 soldiers managed to escape. Generalleutnant Friedrich Weinknecht and the division surrendered to the Red Army.

=== Later war ===
On October 27, 1944, the division was raised again outside the Welle system, this time in West Prussia and now as the 79th Volksgrenadier Division (79. Volks-Grenadier-Division). It had only ten percent combat veterans and was largely made up by absorbing the 586th Volksgrenadier Division (Katzbach). On December 11, 1944, the 79th Volksgrenadier Division was assigned to 7. Armee a reserve force near Bitburg, Germany. Although at half strength, the 79th was to take part in Operation Herbstnebel.

On December 21, 1944, the 79th VG moved towards its assembly area near Diekirch, Luxembourg. On December 24, 1944, the Volksgrenadiers in conjunction with the Führer Grenadier Brigade, launched a series of attacks against the Blue Ridge Division, the 80th Infantry Division (United States). The objective was to seize the town of Heiderscheid, which included a strategic bridge across the Sure River. Both units suffered very heavy losses, particularly when on December 26 most of the 79th VG artillery and FGB armor was destroyed by American fighter bombers. The 79th VG began falling back towards the town of Baunscheid, to hold another strategic bridgehead there; it was unable to hold against the US 80th Infantry Division.

After Heavy fighting continued into January 1945, the Division fell to US forces at Heidelberg and Darmstadt. Remnants of the 79th fought in the vicinity of Rothenburg ob der Tauber under the name Battle Group (Kampfgruppe) "Hummel" in mid-April. This last organized unit of the 79th Volksgrenadier Division surrendered to US Forces on April 14, 1945. Grenadiers of the 79th Volksgrenadier Division fought small unit actions in the Alps.

== Organization ==
Structure of the division:

- Headquarters
- 179th Reconnaissance Battalion
- 208th Infantry Regiment
- 212th Infantry Regiment
- 226th Infantry Regiment
- 179th Engineer Battalion
- 179th Artillery Regiment
- 179th Tank Destroyer Battalion
- 179th Signal Battalion
- 179th Divisional Supply Group

== Commanders ==
79th Infantry Division
General der Infanterie Karl Strecker	March 1939 - January 1942
Generalleutnant Richard Graf von Schwerin	January 1942 - August 1943
Generalmajor Heinrich Kreipe	August 1943 - October 1943
Oberst Andreas von Aulock	October 1943
Generalleutnant Friedrich-August Weinknecht	October 1943 - August 29, 1944 (POW)
Generalmajor Erich Weber	1944

== Bibliography ==
- Quarrie, Bruce The Ardennes Offensive, I ARMEE & VII ARMEE (Order of Battle series book), Osprey Publishing Group, London, UK. 2001. ISBN 1-85532-913-1
- Hans Sänger Die 79. Infanterie-Division. 1939, ISBN 3895552135
- Unteroffizier Werner Psaar, Source: "Wiesbadener Soldatenkalender 1943" Rud. Bechtold & Comp., Wiesbaden
