= Walter Model =

German military officer (1891–1945)

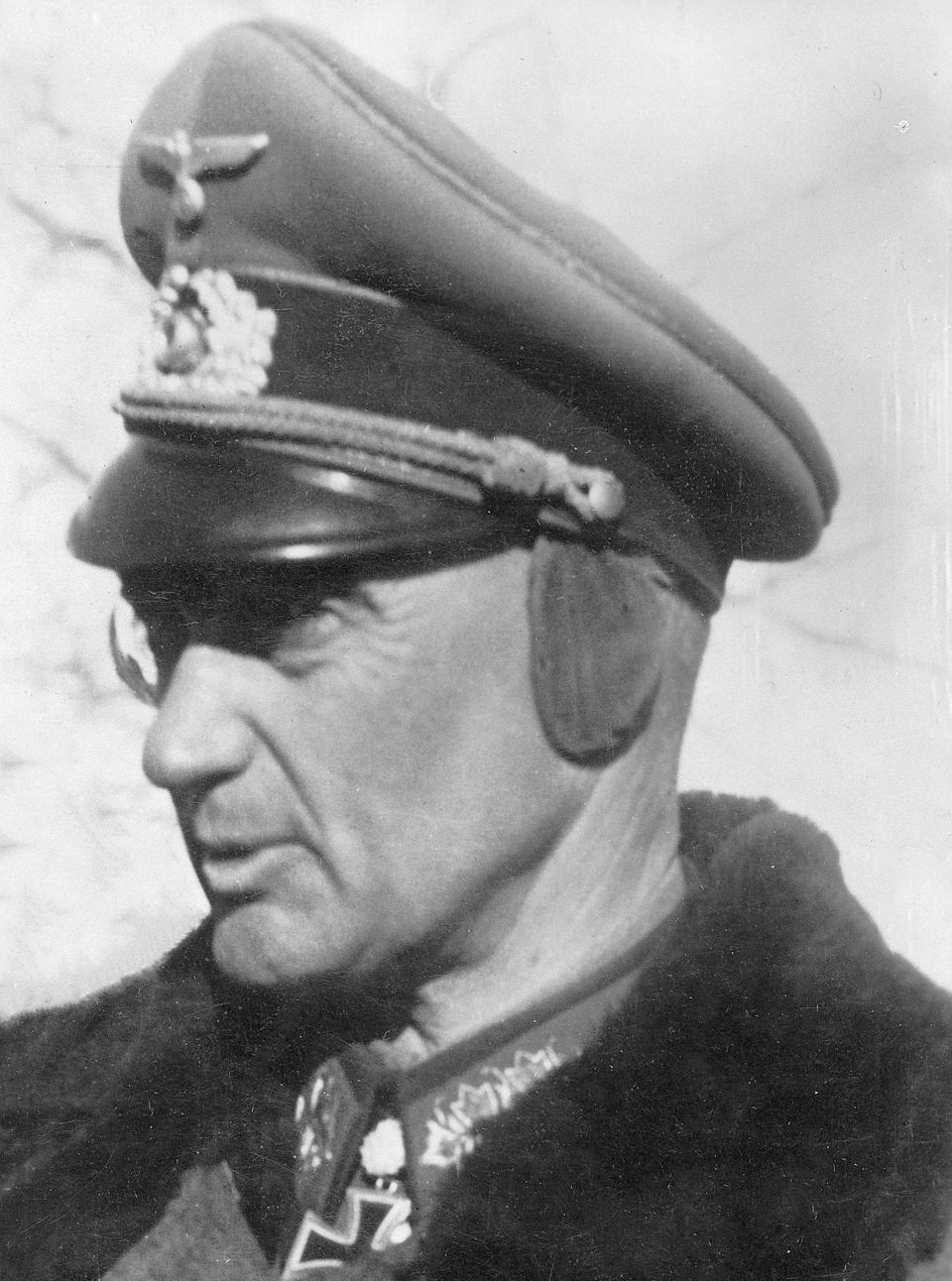
- Model, c. 1942/43
- Born: Otto Moritz Walter Model; 24 January 1891; Genthin, Saxony, Prussia, Germany
- Died: 21 April 1945 (aged 54) near Duisburg, Germany
- Cause of death: Suicide by gunshot
- Burial place: Hürtgenwald (reinterred)
- Military career
- Allegiance: Germany
- Branch: Imperial German Army; Reichswehr; German Army
- Service years: 1909–1945
- Rank: Generalfeldmarschall
- Commands: 3rd Panzer Division; XLI Panzer Corps; Ninth Army; Army Group North; Army Group North Ukraine; Army Group Centre; Army Group B; OB West
- Conflicts: World War I; Battle of Mons; Battle of Arras; Second Battle of Champagne; Battle of Verdun; German spring offensive; Operation Michael; Second Battle of the Marne; Battle of the Lys and the Escaut; World War II; Invasion of Poland; Battle of France; Eastern Front; Operation Barbarossa; Battle of Smolensk; Battle of Kiev; Battle of Moscow; Battles of Rzhev; Operation "Seydlitz"; Operation Mars; Battle of Kursk; Operation Kutuzov; Operation Bagration; Vilnius offensive; Kaunas offensive; Battle of Narva; Battle of Radzymin; Western Front; Invasion of Normandy; Battle of Falaise; Operation Tractable; Battle of Chambois; Battle of Hill 262; Battle of St. Lambert-sur-Dive; Operation Market Garden; Battle of Eindhoven; Battle of Son; Battle of Veghel; Battle of Grave; Battle of Oosterbeek; Battle of Nijmegen; Battle of Nuenen; Battle of Arnhem; Nijmegen counteroffensive; Battle of Scheldt; Operation Pheasant; Battle of Aachen; Battle of Hürtgen Forest; Battle of Vossenack; Battle of Kommerscheidt; Battle of Simonskall; Operation Queen; Battle of the Bulge; Battle of St. Vith; Operation Lumberjack; Ruhr Pocket
- Awards: Knight's Cross of the Iron Cross with Oak Leaves, Swords and Diamonds

Otto Moritz Walter Model (IPA: [ˈmoːdəl]; 24 January 1891 – 21 April 1945) was a German Generalfeldmarschall during World War II. Although he was a hard-driving, aggressive panzer commander early in the war, Model became best known as a practitioner of defensive warfare. His relative success as commander of the Ninth Army in the battles of 1941–1942 determined his future career path.

Model first came to Hitler's attention before World War II, but their relationship did not become especially close until 1942. His tenacious style of fighting and loyalty to the Nazi regime won him plaudits from Hitler, who considered him one of his best field commanders and repeatedly sent him to salvage apparently desperate situations on the Eastern Front as commander of Army Group North, Army Group North Ukraine and Army Group Centre.

In August 1944 Model was sent to the Western Front as commander of OB West and Army Group B. His relationship with Hitler broke down by the end of the war after the German defeat at the Battle of the Bulge. In the aftermath of the defeat of Army Group B and its encirclement in the Ruhr Pocket, Model took his own life on 21 April 1945.

== Early life and career ==
Otto Moritz Walter Model was born in Genthin, Saxony, the son of Otto Paul Moritz Model, a music teacher at a local girls' school, and his wife Marie Pauline Wilhelmine née Demmer. He had a brother, Otto, who was seven years older. He belonged to a middle-class, non-military family. Model's decision to burn all his personal papers at the end of World War II means relatively little is known about his early years. He attended school at the Bürgerschule (citizen school) in Genthin. The family moved to Erfurt in 1900, and then to Naumburg, where he graduated with his abitur from the Domgymnasium Naumburg, a humanities-oriented secondary school, on Easter 1909.

Through the influence of his uncle Martin Model, a reserve officer in the 52nd Infantry Regiment von Alvensleben, he joined that regiment as an officer cadet (Fahnenjunker) on 27 February 1909. He was promoted to Fähnrich on 19 November 1909, and was admitted to the army officer cadet school (Kriegsschule) in Neisse (now Nysa, Poland), where he was an unexceptional student, and was commissioned a Leutnant (2nd lieutenant) in the 52nd Infantry Regiment on 22 August 1910. He made few friends among his fellow officers and soon became known for his ambition, drive, and blunt outspokenness. These were characteristics that marked his entire career. He became the adjutant of his regiment's 1st Battalion in October 1913.

== World War I ==
The 52nd Infantry Regiment was mobilized on the outbreak of World War I in August 1914, and formed part of the 5th Division, which fought on the Western Front. It saw action in the Battle of Mons in August and the First Battle of the Marne in September before occupying a static position in the Soissons sector. Model was promoted to Oberleutnant on 25 February 1915. In May 1915, he was severely wounded near Arras when a bullet hit his shoulder blade, and he spent a month in hospital. He distinguished himself in the fighting around Butte-de-Tahure in September, for which he was awarded the Iron Cross, First Class on 19 October. On 3 November he was wounded by artillery fragments in his right shoulder and spent another six weeks in hospital. He was wounded again on 26 April 1916 in the Battle of Verdun, this time by shell fragments in the right thigh.

Model's deeds brought him to the attention of his divisional commander who, despite misgivings about his "uncomfortable subordinate", recommended Model for German General Staff training. He completed the abbreviated eight-month staff officers' course and returned to the 5th Division as adjutant of the 10th Infantry Brigade. This was followed by postings as a company commander in both the 52nd Infantry Regiment and the 8th Life Grenadiers. In June 1917, Lieutenant Colonel Georg Wetzell, who had been the chief of staff of III Corps, of which the 5th Division was a part, in 1914 and 1915, selected Model for duty on the Oberste Heeresleitung (Army General Staff). Model became an ordnance officer. In late 1917 he was part of a group of junior staff officers who accompanied Colonel Hans von Seeckt to Constantinople to assess the Ottoman Empire's ability to continue prosecuting the war and the possibility of employing German troops in the Middle East.

Model was promoted to Hauptmann (captain) in March 1918, and soon after was assigned to the staff of the Guard Ersatz Division as division supply officer (IIb). As such, he fought in the German spring offensive of that year. The Guard Ersatz Division fought in Operation Michael against the British in March, and in the Second Battle of the Marne against the French in July. On 30 August he became the supply officer of the 36th Reserve Division. The division participated in the Battle of the Lys and the Escaut in October and November.

== Inter-war years ==
Under the terms of the armistice of 11 November 1918 that ended the fighting, the German Army had thirty days to depart France and Belgium. The 36th Reserve Division crossed the border into Germany at Aachen on 20 November, but making its way back to its home station at Danzig was no simple feat in the chaotic conditions that prevailed in immediate post-war Germany. 36th Reserve Division commander Major General Franz von Rantau gave Model the credit for the division reaching Danzig more or less intact.

Model considered leaving the army, but was dissuaded by his uncle Martin. In November 1919, von Seeckt selected Model as one of the 4,000 officers in the 100,000-man post-war Reichswehr permitted by the Treaty of Versailles. After the 36th Reserve Division was demobilised, he became the adjutant of the Danzig-based XVII Corps from January to June 1919. He then joined the staff of the 7th Brigade in Westphalia. In early 1920, he became a company commander in the 14th Infantry Regiment at Konstanz, which was sent to the Ruhr in March 1920 to help crush the Ruhr uprising. Following von Seeckt's example, Model kept aloof from politics in the chaotic period that marked the birth of the Weimar Republic, but the experience of the early 1920s left him with an abhorrence of communism.

While billeted in the Ruhr, Model became acquainted with Herta Huyssen, and they were married in Frankfurt on 11 May 1921. They had three children: a daughter, Hella, who was born in 1923; a son, Hansgeorg, who was born in 1927, and a second daughter, Christa, who was born in 1929. On 1 October 1921, Model was posted to the 18th Infantry Regiment in Munich, where he commanded the regimental machine gun company. After a few months he returned to staff duty with the artillery staff of the 6th Division. He was influenced by the thinking of its commander, General der Infanterie Fritz von Loßberg, who rejected the concept of an elastic defence in favour of a more rigid defence in depth.

In October 1925, following the standard alternation of staff duty with troop duty, Model assumed command of the 9th Company, 3rd Battalion, 8th Infantry Regiment. This was part of the 3rd Division, which was heavily involved in testing the technical innovations of that era. He returned to staff duty in September 1928, as an officer in the training section at 3rd Division headquarters. He lectured in tactics and war studies for the basic General Staff training course, with presentations on the First Battle of the Marne and the Battle of Tannenberg, and authored a 1929 study of August Neidhardt von Gneisenau. His students included Adolf Heusinger, Alfred Jodl, Siegfried Rasp, Hans Speidel and August Winter, who later became generals. Model was promoted to major in October 1929.

In 1930 he was transferred to the Training Branch of the Truppenamt, where he served under Colonels Wilhelm von List, Walter von Brauchitsch, and Walther Wever. He became close friends with Friedrich Paulus, a fellow officer on the staff. In August 1931, he accompanied Brauchitsch, Wilhelm Keitel and Ernst-August Köstring on a visit to Germany's secret training areas in the Soviet Union. Model spent a fortnight with the Red Army's 9th Rifle Division at Rostov, and this formed the basis of a paper he wrote on the Red Army's weapons technology. He was promoted to oberstleutnant (lieutenant colonel) in November 1932.

Model returned to troop duty in November 1933, as commander of a battalion of the 2nd Infantry Regiment, part of the 1st Division, which was stationed at Allenstein in East Prussia. As the Army began to expand again in 1934, each of the battalions became a regiment, and in October 1934, Model became the commander of the new 2nd Infantry Regiment, with the rank of oberst (colonel).

In October 1935, Model was appointed to head the 8th Department (Technical) of the Oberkommando des Heeres (OKH), the revived Army general staff. In this role he was responsible for the development of new weapons, particularly artillery. He was one of the officers who advocated for the creation of armoured divisions and corps. He was promoted to generalmajor (major general) on 1 March 1938. He led a test firing of the 21 cm Mörser 18 on mock Czech fortifications, which did not impress Adolf Hitler. Like many army officers at the time, Model was a supporter of the Nazi Party, and his time in Berlin brought him into contact with senior members of the government, but after General der Artillerie Franz Halder became chief of staff of the OKH in September 1938, there was a purge of pro-Nazi officers from OKH, and Model was reassigned, becoming the chief of staff of the IV Corps in Dresden.

== World War II ==
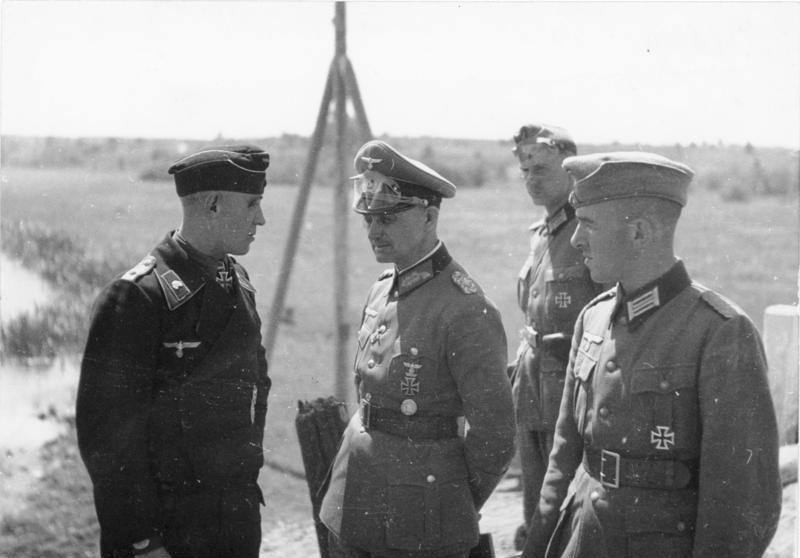
Model (centre) on the Eastern Front, July 1941

=== Invasion of Poland ===
Preparations for the invasion of Poland started in May 1939. The IV Corps became part of the Tenth Army, under the command of Generaloberst Walter von Reichenau, which in turn formed part of Generaloberst Gerd von Rundstedt's Army Group South. World War II began in Europe when IV Corps crossed the border into Poland on 1 September. For the IV Corps, the campaign lasted only eleven days, but there was some hard fighting. On 28 September, the IV Corps was designated the controlling headquarters of the Lublin area. The Lublin Ghetto became one of the first of its kind.

=== Battle of France ===
On 20 October, Model was appointed the chief of staff of the Sixteenth Army on the recommendation of Brauchitsch, who was now the Commander-in-Chief of the Army. The Sixteenth Army's commander was General der Infanterie Ernst Busch. He was an ardent supporter of the Nazi Party, to which he owed his advancement to an army command ahead of several more senior officers, despite his undistinguished record of service in Poland. Brauchitsch hoped that Busch and Model would form a good working relationship, since their politics were similar and social backgrounds were humble. At the same time, he hoped that Model would provide expertise on fast-moving operations for Busch, whose tactical ideas were considered reactionary.

Under the plan for the attack on France, the Sixteenth Army formed part of Rundstedt's army group, now renamed Army Group A. The Sixteenth Army was given the minor role of protecting the left flank, with seven divisions recently mobilised from reservists that were largely equipped with Czech weapons. During the winter, the alternative Manstein Plan (Case Yellow) was adopted, which shifted the main attack to Army Group A. In war games held in February, Model played the commander of the Sixteenth Army while Busch played the French commander, General Maurice Gamelin. Using stolid operational movements, Busch was able to halt the German advance.

Model, who was promoted to generalleutnant on 1 April 1940, had to cope with the Sixteenth Army's composition being completely changed in March and April. The Sixteenth Army's mission was still to cover the flank, but its frontage became much wider, and the imperative for a rapid advance meant that Model spent much of his time overseeing logistical arrangements. When the Germans attacked on 11 May, Gamelin pursued the Dyle Plan rather than the cautious operations that Busch had favoured, and the infantry of Army Group A advanced much faster than expected, leading to an important German victory.

The Sixteenth Army assumed a defensive posture on 25 May. During the next two weeks it prepared for Case Red, the next phase of operations against France, which commenced on 9 June. The Sixteenth Army was transferred to Generaloberst Wilhelm Ritter von Leeb's Army Group C. The Sixteenth Army's advance was initially slow, but a breakthrough was achieved on 11 June, and on 22 June the Sixteenth Army linked up with the First Army, encircling 600,000 French troops. In the wake of the victory in France, Busch and his three corps commanders were all promoted, but Model was not. He was engaged in planning for the Operation Sea Lion, the German invasion of Britain, in which the Sixteenth Army was slated to play a major role.

=== Invasion of the Soviet Union ===
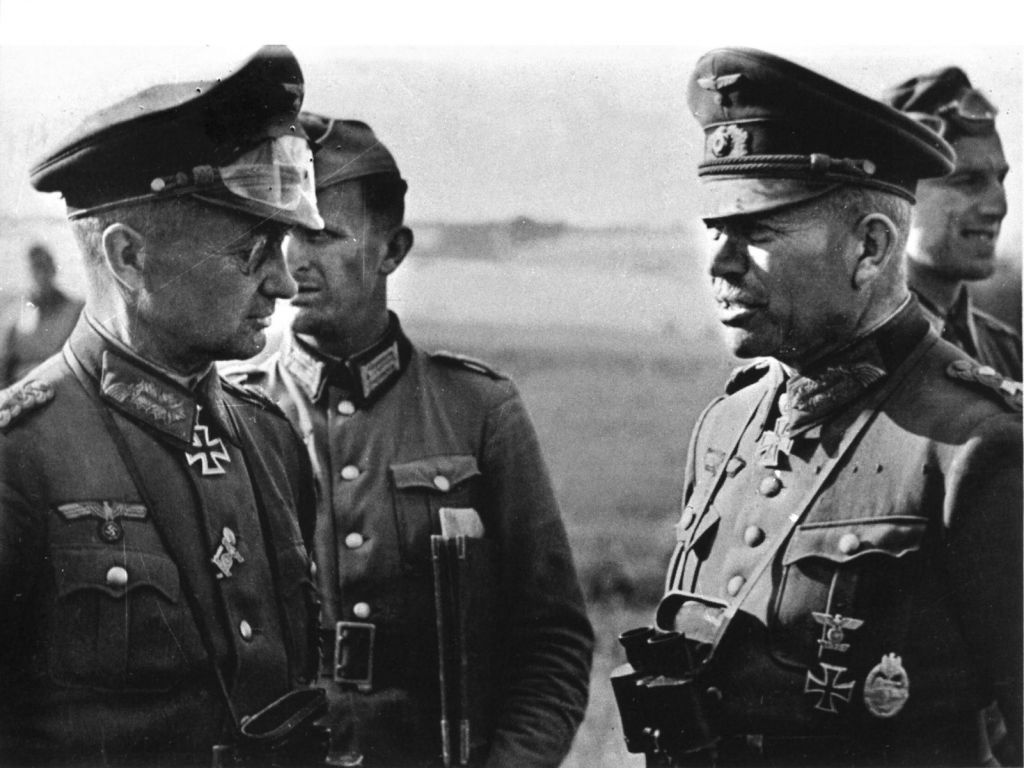
Model with the overall commander of the 2nd Panzer Army and his direct superior, Heinz Guderian, in 1941

Model earned his first senior command posting in November, when he was assigned to lead the 3rd Panzer Division. While a division command was the normal progression for a chief of staff of an army, command of a panzer division was especially prestigious, and Model had no experience leading armoured units. The assignment was engineered by Brauchitsch, who had 3rd Panzer Division's commander, Generalleutnant Horst Stumpff transferred to the 20th Panzer Division. For a time it was thought likely that the 3rd Panzer Division would be sent to North Africa, and some of its subunits were, but in May 1941 it was assigned to General der Kavallerie Leo Geyr von Schweppenburg's XXIV Panzer Corps, which was part of the 2nd Panzer Group, commanded by Generaloberst Heinz Guderian for Operation Barbarossa, the invasion of the Soviet Union.

Model ignored formalities of organization and command, which endeared him to his men and exasperated his staff, who often had to clean up the mess he left behind. He instituted a combined arms training program where his men were thrown together in various ad-hoc groupings regardless of their parent unit: tankers trained with infantry, engineers with reconnaissance units, and so on. He thus anticipated by some months the regular German use of Kampfgruppen in World War II. While this became routine later on, it was not a universal practice in the Wehrmacht in late 1940 and early 1941.

The campaign opened on 22 June 1941, with Guderian urging his divisions forward at breakneck speed. This suited Model, and by 4 July, his advance elements leading the panzer group's charge had reached the Dnieper. Crossing it in strength was another matter, however, as the Red Army was prepared to defend the river line. For this operation, Model, now reinforced with additional troops, reorganised his command into three groups: an infantry-heavy force that would cross the river and establish a bridgehead, a mobile armored group that would pass through the bridgehead and continue the advance, and a fire support group containing nearly all his artillery. The plan worked so successfully that the river crossing cost scarcely any casualties. There followed two weeks of hard fighting to defend the panzer group's flank, during which he was assigned the 1st Cavalry Division in addition to 3rd Panzer as Gruppe Model, who then attacked to break up Soviet forces massing near Roslavl.

After the battle of Smolensk, Hitler ordered a change of direction. Guderian's panzer group turned south into Ukraine. Its objective was to trap the Soviet forces defending Kiev, an unsupported advance of 275 kilometres (171 mi). Once again 3rd Panzer formed the spearhead. From 24 August to 14 September, Model conducted a lightning thrust into the rear of the Soviet Southwestern Front. The manoeuvre reached its conclusion when 3rd Panzer made contact with the 16th Panzer Division from Army Group South at Lokhvitsa. While it took several more days to eliminate all resistance, the trap around Kiev had been closed; 665,000 Soviet soldiers were taken prisoner.

=== Before Moscow ===
The German advance during Operation Barbarossa, June to December 1941

On 26 October 1941, Model was placed in command of XLI Panzer Corps vice Georg-Hans Reinhardt, who stepped up to command of the 3rd Panzer Group, of which the XLI Panzer Corps was a part. He was promoted to General der Panzertruppe, backdated to 1 October. The XLI Panzer Corps was embroiled in Operation Typhoon, the assault on Moscow. The attack had begun on 2 October 1941, and Model arrived at his new command on 14 November, in the midst of the battle. The corps was located at Kalinin, 160 kilometres (99 mi) north west of Moscow. It was worn out, at the end of a long and tenuous supply line, and the cold weather was starting to hamper the Germans. Nevertheless, morale remained high, and the final push towards Moscow began shortly after his arrival.

Model was a whirlwind of energy, touring the front and exhorting his troops to greater efforts: he also ran roughshod over the niceties of protocol and chains of command, and, in general, left his staff trailing in his wake. By 5 December, XLI Panzer Corps' 6th Panzer Division had reached Iohnca, just 35 kilometres (22 mi) from the Kremlin. There, the advance stopped, as the winter took hold. Temperatures dropped to -40 degrees C (-40 degrees F), weapons and vehicles froze solid, and the Germans were forced to call a halt to offensive operations.

Just as the Germans had made the halt decision, the Soviet Kalinin, Western and Southwestern Fronts launched a massive counteroffensive, aimed at driving Army Group Centre back from Moscow. The attacks were especially strong against Third Panzer Group, which had made some of the closest penetrations to the city. In three weeks of confused, savage fighting, Reinhardt extricated his troops from potential encirclement and fell back to the Lama River line. Placed in charge of covering the retreat, Model's harsh, almost brutal, style of leadership now paid dividends as panic threatened to infect the German columns. On several occasions, he restored order at a congested crossroads with a drawn pistol, but the retreat never became a rout.

During this period, Model noticed that the Soviet attacks tended to be most successful when the Germans employed a strongpoint defense instead of a continuous line. Moreover, Soviet logistics were still inadequate to support a fast-moving battle; thus, even if a gap was made, it did not automatically mean a crisis. Therefore, he ordered his men to spread themselves out, which exploited his corps' advantage in artillery over the Soviets, while he created small mechanised kampfgruppen or alarmeinheiten (alarm units) to deal with any breakthrough. His tactics were successful, if costly. By the end of 1941, the 6th Panzer Division mustered 1,000 men, including all frontline, support and staff personnel. He continued to advocate similar tactics throughout the remainder of his career.

=== Rzhev ===
Model's success in holding his front had not gone unnoticed, and in January 1942 he was placed in charge of the Ninth Army occupying the Rzhev salient, leapfrogging at least fifteen more senior commanders in Army Group Centre alone. Just prior to his departure for the front, the new army commander had held lengthy consultations with both Hitler and Halder. They impressed upon Model that great firmness would be necessary to save the army from destruction, and his vehement tone in reply so impressed Hitler that upon the General's departure he remarked: "Did you see that eye? I trust that man to do it, but I wouldn't want to serve under him".

When Model took over, his sector was in a shambles: the Kalinin Front had broken through the line and was threatening the Moscow–Smolensk railway, the main supply route for Army Group Centre. Despite the danger, he realized the precarious position the attackers themselves were in and immediately counterattacked, cutting off the Soviet 39th Army. To hold the line Model threw every available man to the front, drafting construction units and the like to replenish the enormous German losses. In the ferocious battles that followed, he repelled multiple Soviet attempts to relieve their trapped soldiers, the last being in February. On 31 January 1942, Model was awarded the Oak Leaves to the Knight's Cross and promoted to generaloberst.

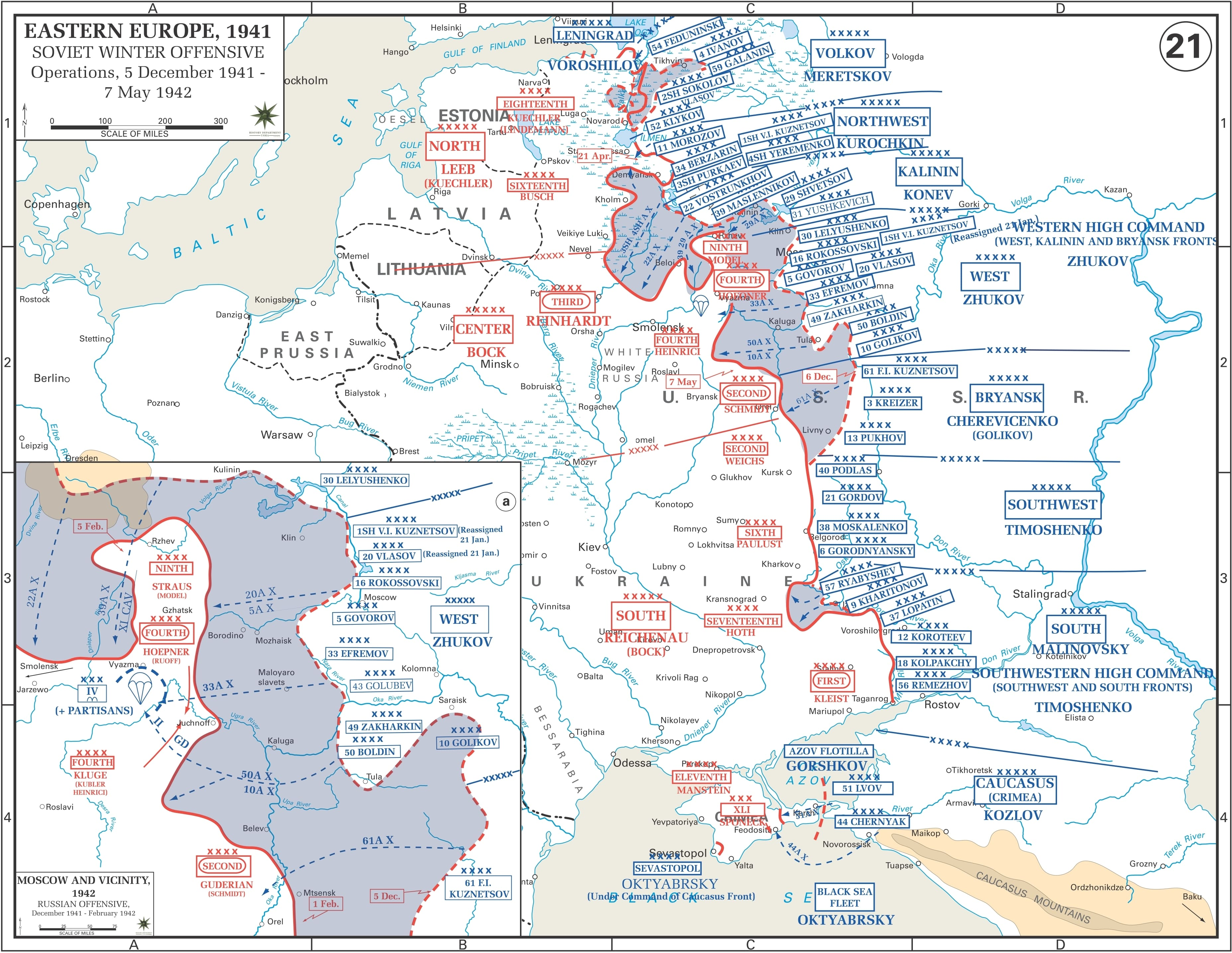
Soviet 1941 Winter counteroffensive

Having restored Ninth Army's front, Model set about holding it. His defensive doctrine, which combined conventional thinking with his own tactical innovations, was based on the following principles:

- Up-to-date intelligence, based on frontline sources and reconnaissance instead of relying on reports from rear-area analysts.
- A continuous front line, no matter how thinly held.
- Tactical reserves to halt any imminent breakthrough.
- Centralized artillery command and control. Since the end of World War I, German divisions had had their artillery spread out amongst their component regiments, which made it difficult to bring the maximum weight of fire to bear on any one point. Model reorganized his artillery into special battalions under the direct control of the divisional and corps commanders.
- Multiple static lines of defense, to delay the enemy's advance. Hitler had in fact forbidden the construction of multiple lines, saying that soldiers would be tempted to abandon their current line in favor of falling back to the next; Model ignored this order.

The expediency of preparing rearward defence lines, although these went against the express wishes of Hitler, meant that Model's influence was felt even when he was absent from the battlefield. At the end of July 1942 the front erupted as a new Soviet offensive tore through the German defence at Rzhev. Model was on convalescent leave, having been hit by a chance rifle shot while flying over the front. Model returned to Ninth Army on the 10 August and immediately made his presence felt. He ordered the creation of scratch battle groups made up of soldiers returning from leave and threw them into the fighting.

By the close of September, the Soviet offensive was temporarily spent, but Georgy Zhukov, unhappy with the results of the summer and still aware of opportunities around the Rzhev salient, tried again with even more force in November. Code named Operation Mars, Soviet forces struck at the Ninth Army from four directions. Model's defensive abilities were once again put to the test, and his forces were once again able to contain and then cut off and destroy Soviet spearheads, even though the German losses were again extensive. Model emerged from a year of fighting around Rzhev with an enhanced reputation as a "Lion of defence". Liddell Hart wrote that he had "the amazing capability to collect a reserve from an almost empty battlefield".

Ninth Army eventually evacuated the salient in Operation Büffel in March 1943, as part of a general shortening of the line. Large-scale security sweeps and reprisals were carried out in the weeks before the operation in which an estimated 3,000 Russians were killed, the great majority of whom were unarmed, as shown by the inventory of the seized weapons: 277 rifles, 41 pistols, 61 machine guns, 17 mortars, 9 antitank rifles and 16 small artillery pieces. The withdrawal was precisely planned and took two weeks, with minimal casualties or disruption in a move of an Army group numbering approximately 300,000 men, 100 tanks and 400 artillery pieces. In its wake, Model personally ordered the deportation of all male civilians, wells poisoned, and at least two dozen villages razed in a scorched earth policy to hinder the Red Army's follow up in the area. British war correspondent Alexander Werth visited the area soon after the liberation and saw for himself the results of Model's orders. The report listed Model at the top of the list of the war criminals responsible for the "deliberate extermination policy" and noted that most of the killings of civilians were carried out by regular Wehrmacht units, not just the Gestapo or the Sicherheitsdienst.

=== Kursk and Orel ===
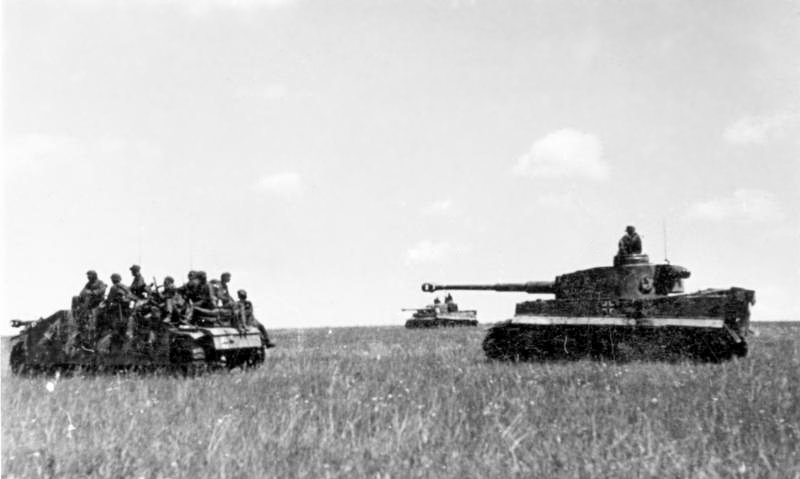
German armoured vehicles during Operation Citadel, summer 1943

On 5 July 1943, Model led the northern assault on Kursk during Operation Citadel, a plan which had caused great controversy within the German high command. Generalfeldmarschalls Günther von Kluge and Erich von Manstein, commanding Army Groups Centre and South respectively, had originally urged that the salient be attacked in May, before the Soviets could prepare their defences. Others, including Inspector General of Armoured Troops Generaloberst Heinz Guderian, felt that attacking was unnecessary, since it would occasion heavy tank losses and thus upset plans for increasing German armoured strength.

Model was skeptical of the plan's chances, pointing out that Konstantin Rokossovsky's Central Front was strongly dug in and outnumbered him two to one in men, tanks and artillery. Rather than conclude that the offensive be called off, however, he said it should be postponed until he could receive further reinforcements, in particular the new Panther tanks and Ferdinand tank destroyers. Manstein took his recommendation at face value, while Guderian said that he was categorically against attacking. It has similarly been suggested that Model, in fact, hoped to scuttle the operation by causing it to be delayed until the Soviet forces launched their own attack.

Model's assault was a failure, as Ninth Army quickly became enmeshed in the elaborate Soviet fortifications. The Red Army's strength in the salient was, in fact, growing much faster than that of the attacking force. Nor did his tactical plan of attack meet with great success. Having less armour and more artillery than Manstein in the south, and fearing that the deep Soviet defences would stall an armour-heavy attack, he decided to use his infantry to breach Rokossovsky's line before unleashing his armour. It did not work. The Germans took heavy losses to advance less than 12 kilometres (7.5 mi) in seven days, and were unable to break through to open ground. Model threw his armour into the fray, but with little effect, beyond incurring more casualties. As mitigating factors, the Red Army had concentrated more of their strength facing Model in the north; and Rokossovsky had correctly anticipated where the attack would come, defending that sector heavily. Model's use of infantry assaults also meant his losses in armour were lower than those of Manstein.

Model had anticipated the possibility of a Soviet attack into the Orel Salient, and had (without OKH's knowledge) constructed extensive defensive works to meet such an attack. Following the stalling of his advance, the Soviet counter-offensive, Operation Kutuzov, duly opened on 12 July. It involved not just Rokossovsky's Central Front, but also the Bryansk and Western Fronts, a greater concentration of forces than Model had assaulted in Operation Citadel. For the battle, Kluge placed him in command of Second Panzer Army in addition to Ninth Army—a larger total force than he had commanded in Citadel.

The Soviet preponderance of strength was such that Stavka expected it to take only 48 hours to reach Orel, splitting the German forces into three parts; instead, the battle ended three weeks later with Model's orderly withdrawal from the salient. An idea of the scale of the fighting compared to Citadel can be gained from the combined casualty lists for Second Panzer and Ninth Armies: from 1 to 10 July, the Germans took 21,000 casualties, and from 11 to 31 July, 62,000. Despite these losses he had inflicted similarly heavy casualties on the three Red Army Fronts, shortened the line, and avoided annihilation.

As in the Rzhev withdrawal, Model ordered his troops to carry out a scorched earth policy, destroying the infrastructure and harvest, and deporting 250,000 civilians in inhuman conditions. After the loss of Orel, Model withdrew to the Dnieper as the Red Army went on the offensive from Smolensk in the north to Rostov in the south. He was relieved of command of the Ninth Army at the end of September, and took the opportunity to go on three months' leave in Dresden with his family.

=== Estonia ===
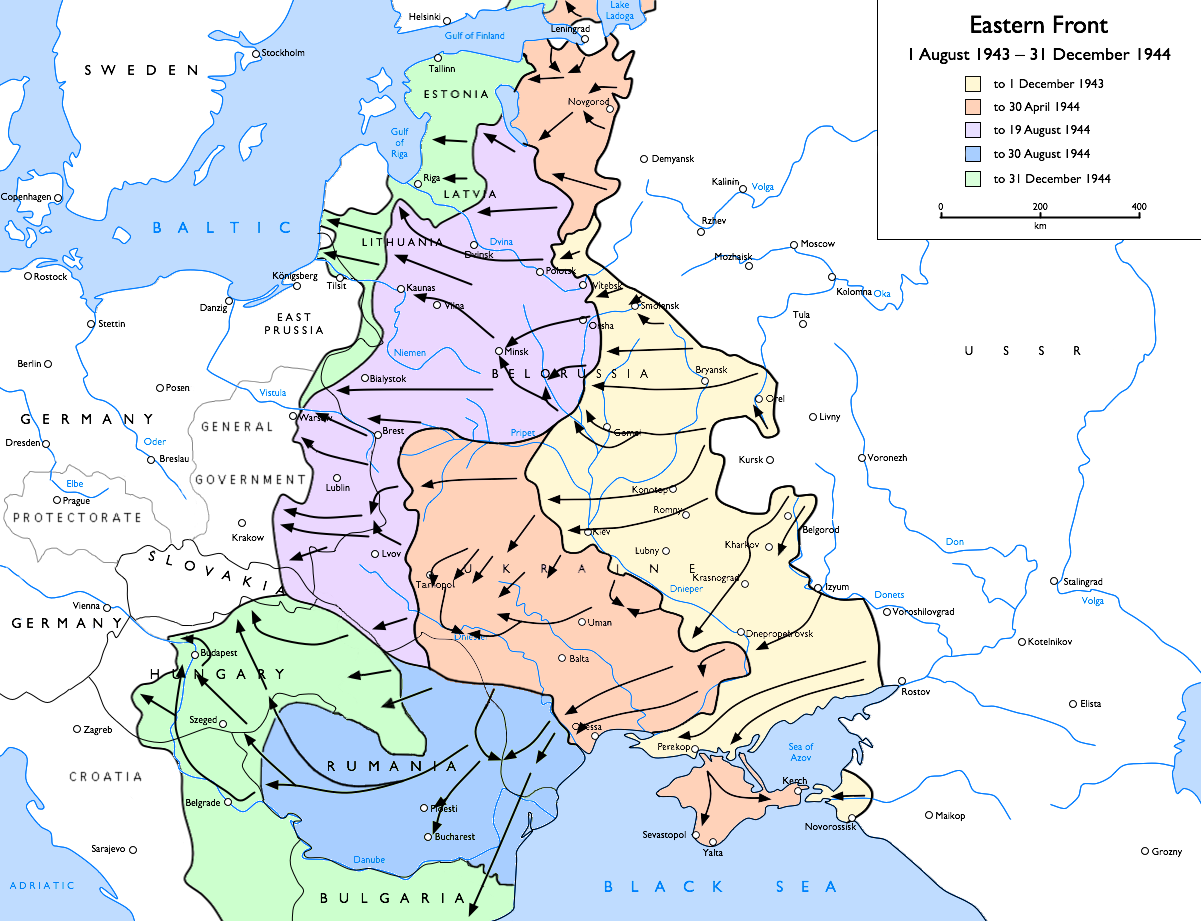
Soviet advances on the Eastern Front, August 1943 to December 1944

Model's relief is believed not to have been a sign that he had lost Hitler's confidence, but rather that he had gained it, Hitler wanting him available should another emergency break out which needed his attention. Thus, on 31 January 1944, he was urgently sent to command Army Group North, which, two weeks earlier, had seen the siege of Leningrad broken by the Volkhov, Leningrad and 2nd Baltic Fronts.

The situation was dire: the Eighteenth Army had been shattered into three parts, and the front had virtually dissolved. The army group's previous commander, Generalfeldmarschall Georg von Küchler, had pleaded for permission to withdraw to the Panther Line in Estonia, which was still only half-completed at that stage. Model cracked down on such talk, instituting a new policy he called Shield and Sword (Schild und Schwert).

Under this doctrine, ground would only temporarily be ceded, to gather reserves for an immediate counter-attack that would drive the Red Army back and relieve pressure on other areas of the front. These statements of aggressive intent won over Hitler and OKH, who had no substantial reserves to send him, but were still unwilling to lose territory. Historians have since debated their significance, some claiming that Shield and Sword was Hitler's invention, while others say they were a calculated ploy by Model to disguise his true intent—to pull back to the Panther Line.

Regardless, the "temporary" loss of ground usually became permanent, as Model conducted a fighting withdrawal to the Panther Line. He delegated responsibility for the Narva front to General der Infanterie Johannes Friessner commanding Army Detachment Narva, while he concentrated on extricating Eighteenth Army from its predicament. Without OKH's notice or approval, he constructed a series of interim defensive lines to cover its retreat, slowing down and inflicting heavy losses on the pursuing Soviet forces in the process.

By 1 March, the withdrawal was complete. His forces were mostly intact, but the fighting had been fierce: his Shield and Sword counter-attacks alone had cost him some 10,000–12,000 men. These counter-attacks usually failed to recover ground, but they kept the Red Army off-balance and won Model time to pull his units back. They also allowed him to say to Hitler that he was pursuing an aggressive approach, even as the front moved steadily to the west. Model was promoted to 'generalfeldmarschall on 30 March 1944, backdated to 1 March.

=== Ukraine, Belarus, Lithuania and Poland ===
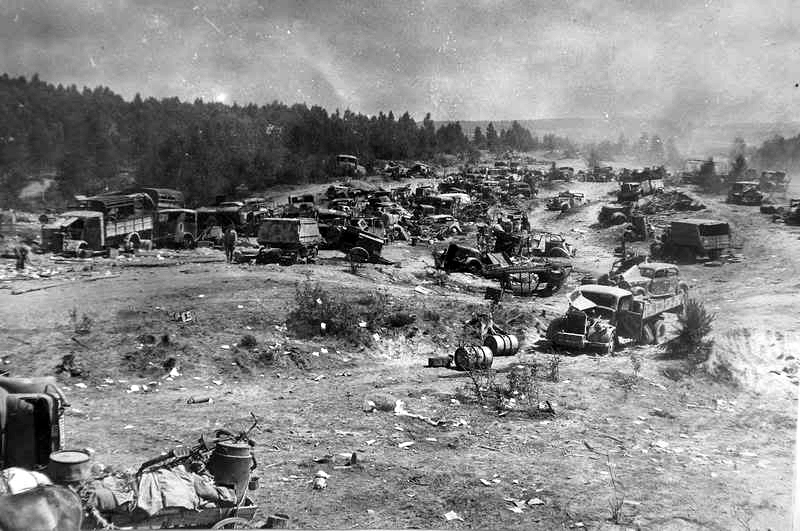
German vehicles abandoned during the Ninth Army's retreat from Belarus, July 1944

On 30 March 1944, Model was placed in command of Army Group North Ukraine in Galicia, which was withdrawing under heavy pressure from Zhukov's 1st Ukrainian Front, vice Manstein, who had fallen out of favour with Hitler. Despite Manstein's previous victories, Hitler wanted someone whom he anticipated would be unyielding in defence.

On 28 June, Model was sent to rescue Army Group Centre, which had been torn apart by Operation Bagration, the Soviet offensive in Belorussia. The Ninth and Fourth Armies were trapped, and the Red Army was about to liberate Minsk. Despite the catastrophic situation, Model believed he could still hold Minsk, but this would require Fourth Army to break out of its pocket, and reinforcements to counter-attack the Soviet advance. The reinforcements, in turn, could only be obtained by pulling back, thus shortening the line and freeing up troops. The general consensus is that the German position was doomed, regardless of what Model could have done, but Hitler refused to sanction either Fourth Army's escape or a general withdrawal, until it was too late.

Minsk was liberated by the Soviet 1st and 3rd Belorussian Fronts on 3 July, but Model still hoped to re-establish the front to the west of the city, with the aid of divisions from Army Groups North and North Ukraine. However, German strength was unequal to the task, and he had been driven out of Vilnius and Baranovichi by 8 July. At the same time, the 1st Ukrainian Front (now commanded by Ivan Konev) and the 1st Belorussian Front's left wing (which had been uncommitted thus far) opened up a fresh offensive against Army Group North Ukraine. In this battle, the First Panzer Army managed to hold the line east of Lvov using Model's defensive tactics, but was forced to retreat when the Fourth Panzer Army, weakened by the steady flow of units to Army Group Centre, was unable to stem the Soviet penetrations of its front.

Model encircled and destroyed the Soviet 3rd Tank Corps in a large-scale tank battle near Radzymin and stopped the Red Army's advance just short of Warsaw by 3 August, setting up a continuous front along the Vistula.

=== Normandy ===
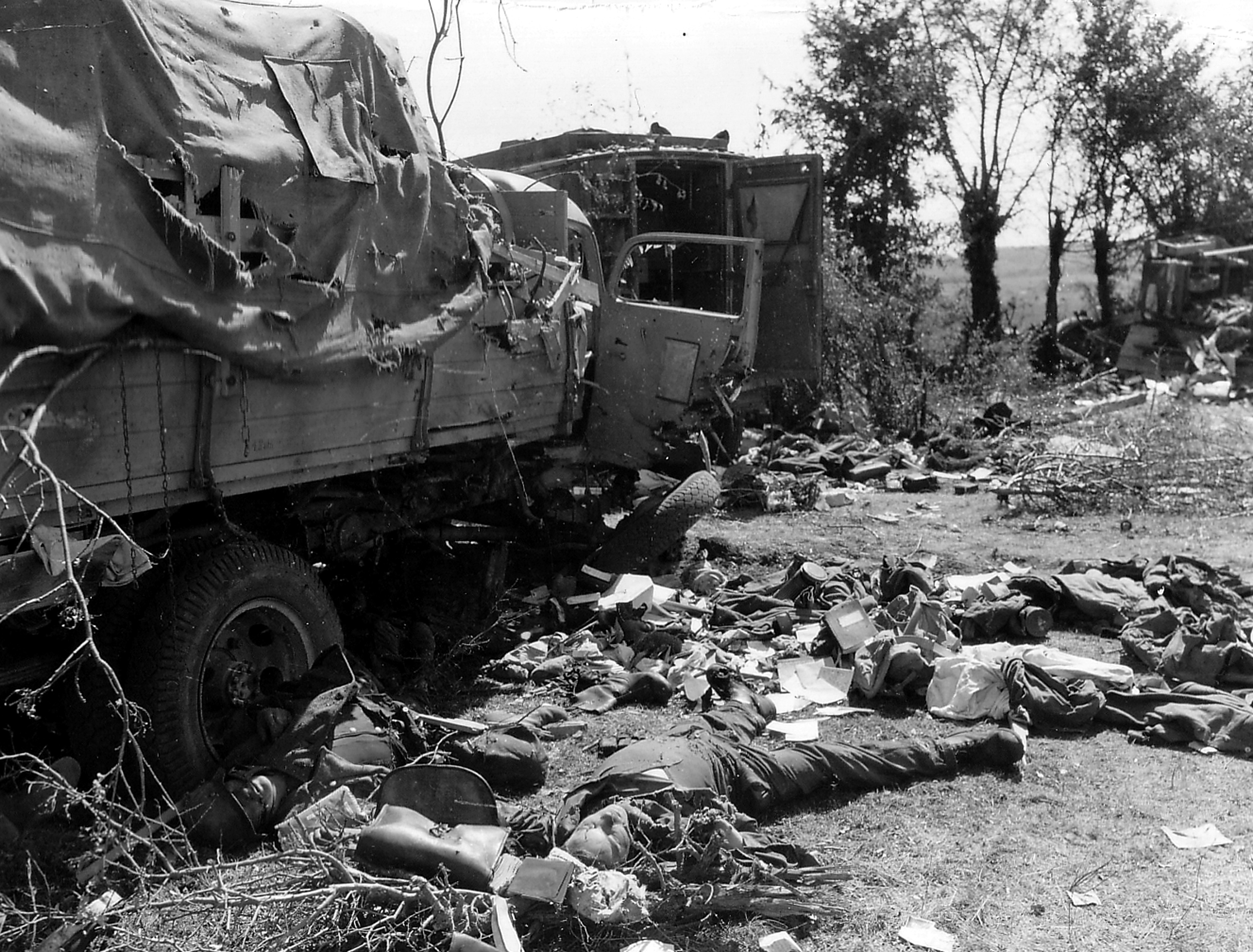
Remains of a German convoy destroyed near Falaise

On 17 August 1944, Model received Diamonds from Hitler to go with his Knight's Cross with Oakleaves and Swords, in recognition of his shoring up of the Eastern Front. Simultaneously, he was transferred to the west, replacing Kluge as commander-in-chief of Army Group B and OB West. The front in Normandy had collapsed after nearly two months of intense fighting, the U.S. Third Army was driving for the Seine, and an Army group was in danger of being annihilated in the Falaise pocket.

Model's first order was that Falaise be defended, which did not impress his staff. However, he quickly changed his mind, convincing Hitler to authorise the immediate escape of the German Seventh Army and Panzer Group Eberbach—something that Kluge, with his limited political clout, had not been able to do. He was thus able to rescue a high proportion of the units involved, albeit at the cost of nearly all their armor and heavy materiel. When Hitler demanded that Paris be held, Model replied that he could do so, but only if given an extra 200,000 men and several panzer divisions—an act that has been described as naïveté by some, and canny bargaining by others. The reinforcements were not forthcoming, and the city's liberation took place on 25 August.

After the fighting in Normandy, Model established his headquarters at Oosterbeek, near Arnhem in the Netherlands, where he set about the massive task of rebuilding Army Group B. On 17 August 1944, he was appointed to the temporary command of OB West, upon Kluge's recall to Berlin to answer charges that he had been involved with the failed 20 July Plot. (Kluge committed suicide en route.) Model retained command of OB West for eighteen days before Hitler appointed Rundstedt as the permanent replacement for Kluge, allowing Model to return to command of Army Group B.

=== Retreat to Germany ===
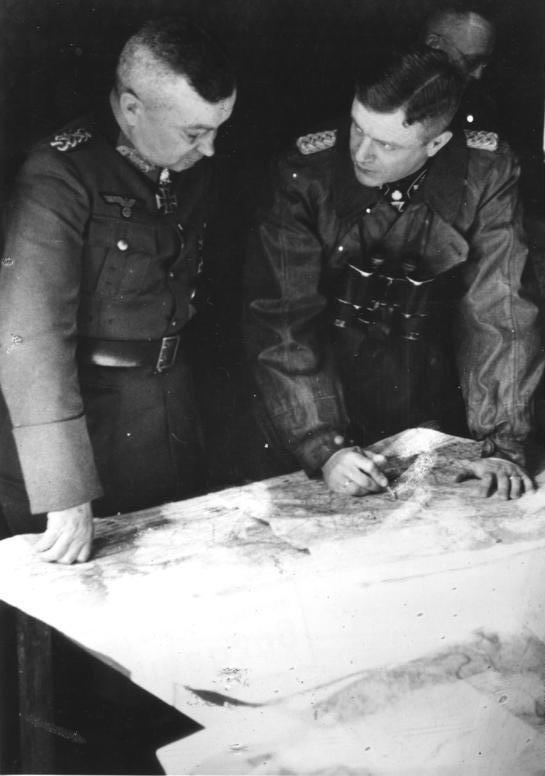
Model with Heinz Harmel

On 17 September, his lunch was interrupted when the British 1st Airborne Division dropped into the town launching Operation Market Garden, the Allied attempt to capture the bridges on the lower Rhine, Maas and Waal. Model initially thought they were trying to capture him and his staff, but the seemingly vast scale of the assault soon convinced him otherwise. When he perceived what the Allies' real objective was, he ordered the II SS Panzer Corps into action. The corps, containing the 9th and 10th SS Panzer Divisions refitting after Normandy, had been overlooked by Allied intelligence. While still seriously understrength, it was composed of veterans and was a deadly threat to lightly equipped paratroopers. 9th SS Panzer took on the British at Arnhem, while the 10th moved south to defend the bridge at Nijmegen.

Model believed that the situation represented not just a threat, but also an opportunity to counter-attack and possibly clear the Allies out of the Southern Netherlands. Towards this end, he forbade SS-Obergruppenführer Willi Bittrich and SS-Brigadeführer Heinz Harmel, commanding II SS Panzer Corps and 10th SS Panzer respectively, from destroying the Nijmegen bridge. With the exception of this tactical error, Model is considered to have fought an outstanding battle and handed the Allies a sharp defeat. The bridge at Arnhem was held and the 1st Airborne Division destroyed, dashing the Allies' hopes for a foothold over the Rhine before the end of the year.

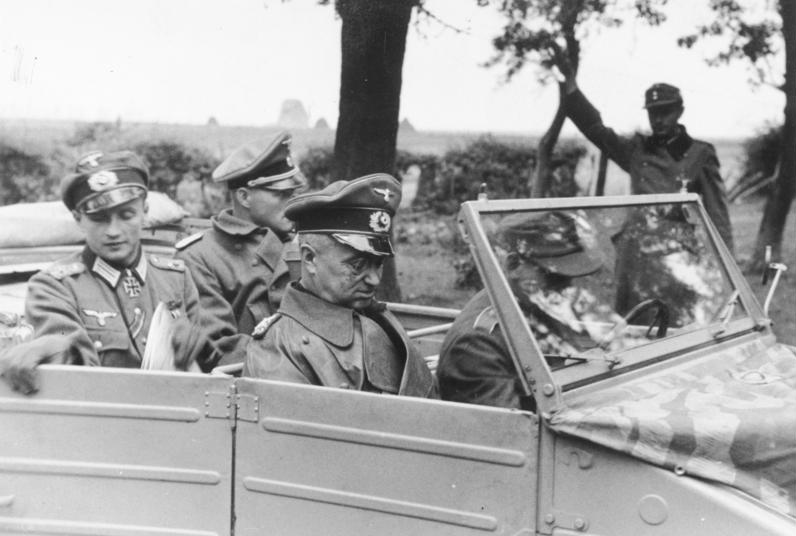
Model visiting the 246th Volksgrenadier Division in Aachen

Despite the failed German counter offensive to evict the allies from the Island in early October, Arnhem restored much of Model's self-confidence, which had been shaken by the experience of Normandy. From September to December, he fought another Allied thrust to a standstill, this time by Lieutenant General Omar Bradley's U.S. Twelfth Army Group in the Battle of Hürtgen Forest and the Battle of Aachen. While he interfered less in the day-to-day movements of his units than at Arnhem, he still kept himself fully informed on the situation, slowing the Allies' progress, inflicting heavy casualties and taking full advantage of the fortifications of the Westwall, known to the Allies as the Siegfried Line.

The Hürtgen Forest cost the U.S. First Army at least 33,000 killed and incapacitated, including both combat and non-combat losses: German casualties were at least 28,000. Aachen eventually fell on 22 October, again at high cost to the U.S. Ninth Army. The Ninth Army's push to the Roer fared no better, and did not manage to cross the river or wrest control of its dams from the Germans. Hürtgen was so costly that it has been called an Allied "defeat of the first magnitude".

=== Battle of the Bulge ===
Following the Wehrmacht's recent defensive victories in the West, Hitler decided to launch a last-ditch offensive aiming to catch the western Allied forces by surprise, with the objective of retaking Antwerp. The intent was to strike the seam between the British and Americans, leading to political and military disharmony between the Allies, isolate the 21st Army Group, and thereby allow their encirclement and destruction before the American leadership (particularly the political leadership) could react; this would stop the immediate enemy ground threat to the Ruhr.

Model speaking with members of the Hitler Youth in October 1944

Model, along with all the other commanders involved, believed this goal was unachievable given the resources available to the Wehrmacht on the Western Front at this late point in the war. His first reaction to the plan was caustic in the extreme: "This plan hasn't got a damned leg to stand on." At the same time, both he and Rundstedt felt that the purely defensive posture as had been adopted since retirement from Normandy could only delay Germany's defeat, not prevent it. Thus, he prepared Operation Herbstnebel, a less ambitious attack that did not aim to cross the Meuse, but would still, if successful, have inflicted a severe setback on the Western Allied Army groups now bearing down on the Franco-German border. A similar plan had been developed by Rundstedt at OB West, and the two field marshals combined their idea to present a joint "small solution" to Hitler. Hitler, however, rejected this compromise, and the "big solution" of aiming for Antwerp was ordered, in what subsequently came to be known as the Battle of the Bulge.

For this operation Model had at his disposal Sixth Panzer Army, Fifth Panzer Army and Seventh Army. These armies, with over 2,000 panzers and 2,000 airplanes represented the last strategic reserve of the crumbling Third Reich. Despite his misgivings, Model threw himself into the task with his usual energy, cracking down on any defeatism he might find. When a staff officer complained about shortages, Model snapped: "If you need anything, take it from the Americans".

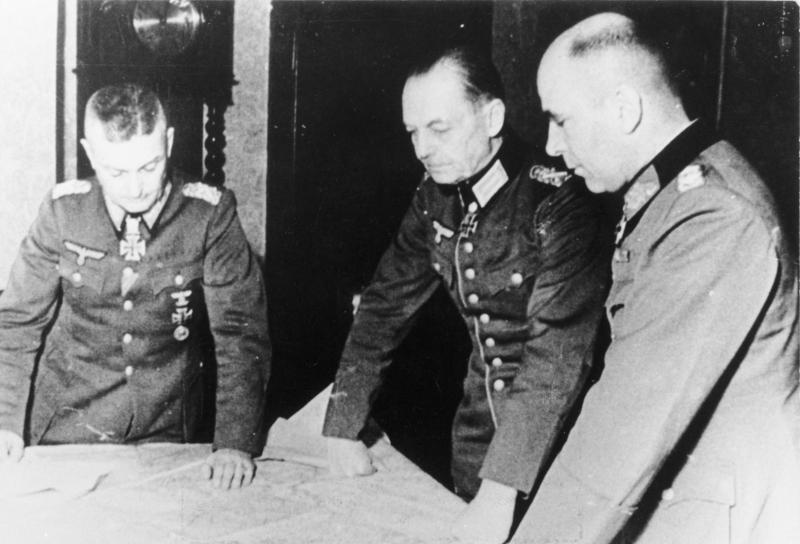
Model, Rundstedt and Krebs, November 1944

When Generalmajor Ludwig Heilmann warned Model that his command, the 5th Parachute Division, was only a Class IV outfit, Model, who by now must have had a surfeit of complaints on lack of equipment and insufficient training, merely replied that success would be won by the paratroopers' "usual audacity." He remained acutely aware of both the operation's significance, and its most likely outcome. When Oberst Friedrich August von der Heydte, ordered to lead a parachute drop as part of the operation, said that the jump had no more than a 10 percent chance of success, he replied: "Well, then it is necessary to make the attempt, since the entire offensive has no more than a 10 percent chance of success. It must be done, since this offensive is the last remaining chance to conclude the war favourably."

The operation was launched on 16 December 1944 and enjoyed initial success, but it quickly suffered from a lack of air cover and the inexperience in some of its infantry component, and critically short fuel supply. The Sixth Panzer Army met heavy Allied resistance, and while the Fifth Panzer Army managed to make a deep thrust into the Allied line, Model was unable to exploit the breakthrough there. He had failed to capture a vital road junction at Bastogne, and this, in combination with poor weather and difficult terrain, caused the German columns to back up into huge traffic jams on the roads behind the front. Starved of fuel and ammunition, the attack had broken down by 25 December, and was abandoned on 8 January 1945.

=== Defeat at the Ruhr ===
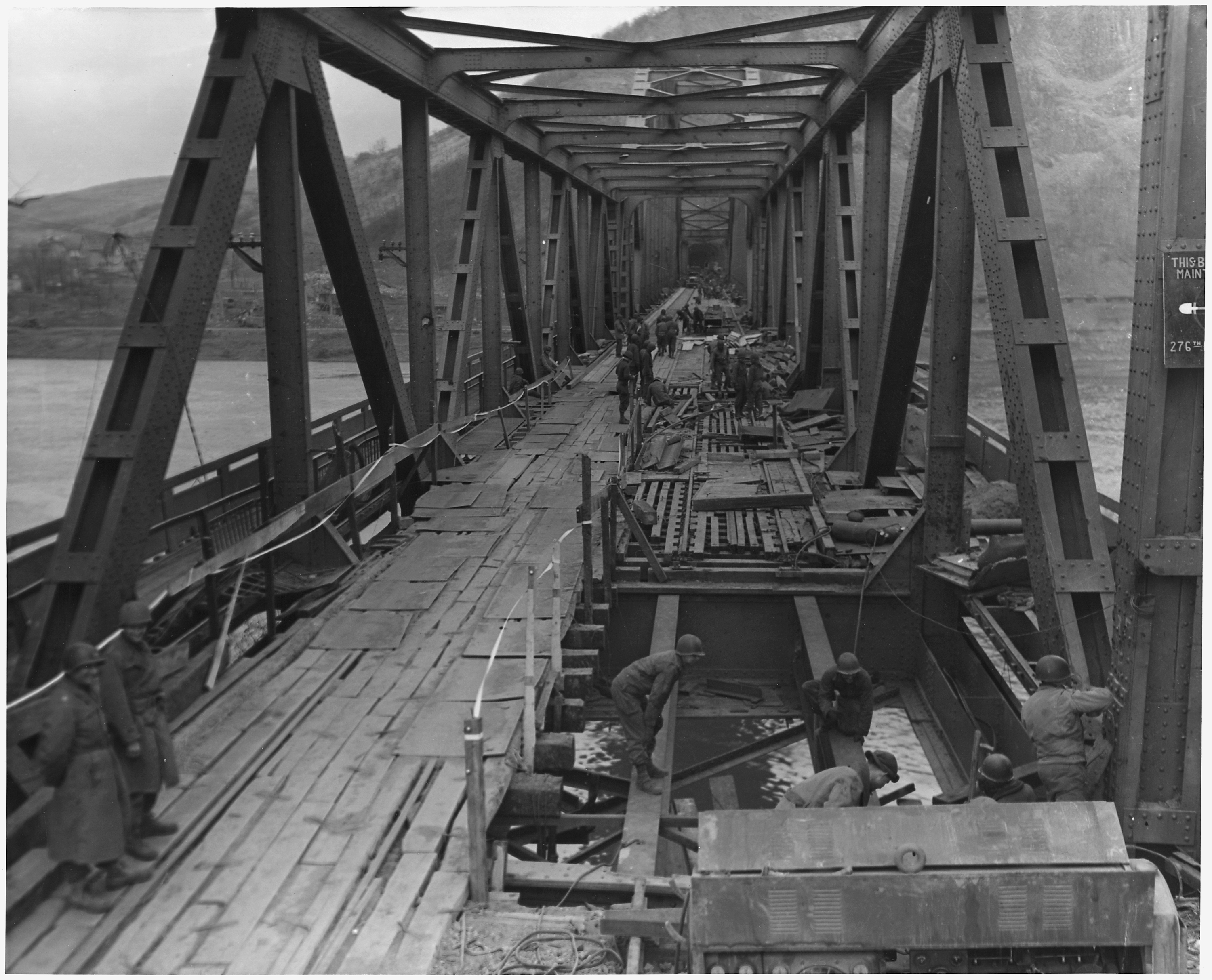
The Allied capture of the bridge at Remagen was the beginning of the end for Model.

The failure of Unternehmen Wacht am Rhein (the Wehrmacht's name for the Ardennes-Alsace offensive) marked the end of Model's special relationship with Hitler, who on 21 January 1945 issued an order that all the divisions of Army Group B would thenceforth be personally responsible to him to limit Model's operational freedom of decision. Any suggestion of its withdrawal back to the river Rhine to obtain a better fighting position—given the Third Reich's weakening strength against the Allied torrent of men and material—was forbidden, and it was ordered to conduct its actions from now on upon the strategic basis of not yielding an inch of ground and an abandonment of tactical maneuver. By mid-March Model and Army Group B had been forced back into attritional warfare with the Americans across the Rhine river into Germany itself after the stunning failure to destroy the Ludendorff Bridge during the Battle of Remagen.

On 1 April Army Group B found itself completely surrounded in the Ruhr by the U.S. First and Ninth Armies. Hitler's response was to declare the Ruhr a fortress, from which he commanded that there was to be no surrender or attempt to break out, in an order similar to that which he had issued at Stalingrad. He further ordered that its physical economic infrastructure—the heart of Germany's industrial power—be destroyed by Army Group B to prevent it falling into Allied hands. Model ignored these instructions.

On 15 April, after the Allies had split the pocket into two, Major-General Matthew Ridgway commanding the U.S. XVIII Airborne Corps called upon Model to surrender rather than throw the lives of the soldiers under his command away in an impossible tactical situation for Army Group B. Model's reply was that he still considered himself bound by his oath to Adolf Hitler and his sense of honor as a German field marshal, and in consequence a formal surrender was out of the question. Instead of surrendering, Model ordered Army Group B's dissolution. The oldest and youngest soldiers were discharged from military service and the remaining men were granted leave by order, to either surrender or attempt to break out at their own discretion. The Fifth Panzer Army had already laid down its arms before this order was given and Model's command communications in the pocket were disintegrating. On 20 April, Joseph Goebbels' Propaganda Ministry in Berlin publicly denounced Army Group B as traitors to the Reich, marking the final act between Model and the Nazi regime he had served.

== Suicide ==
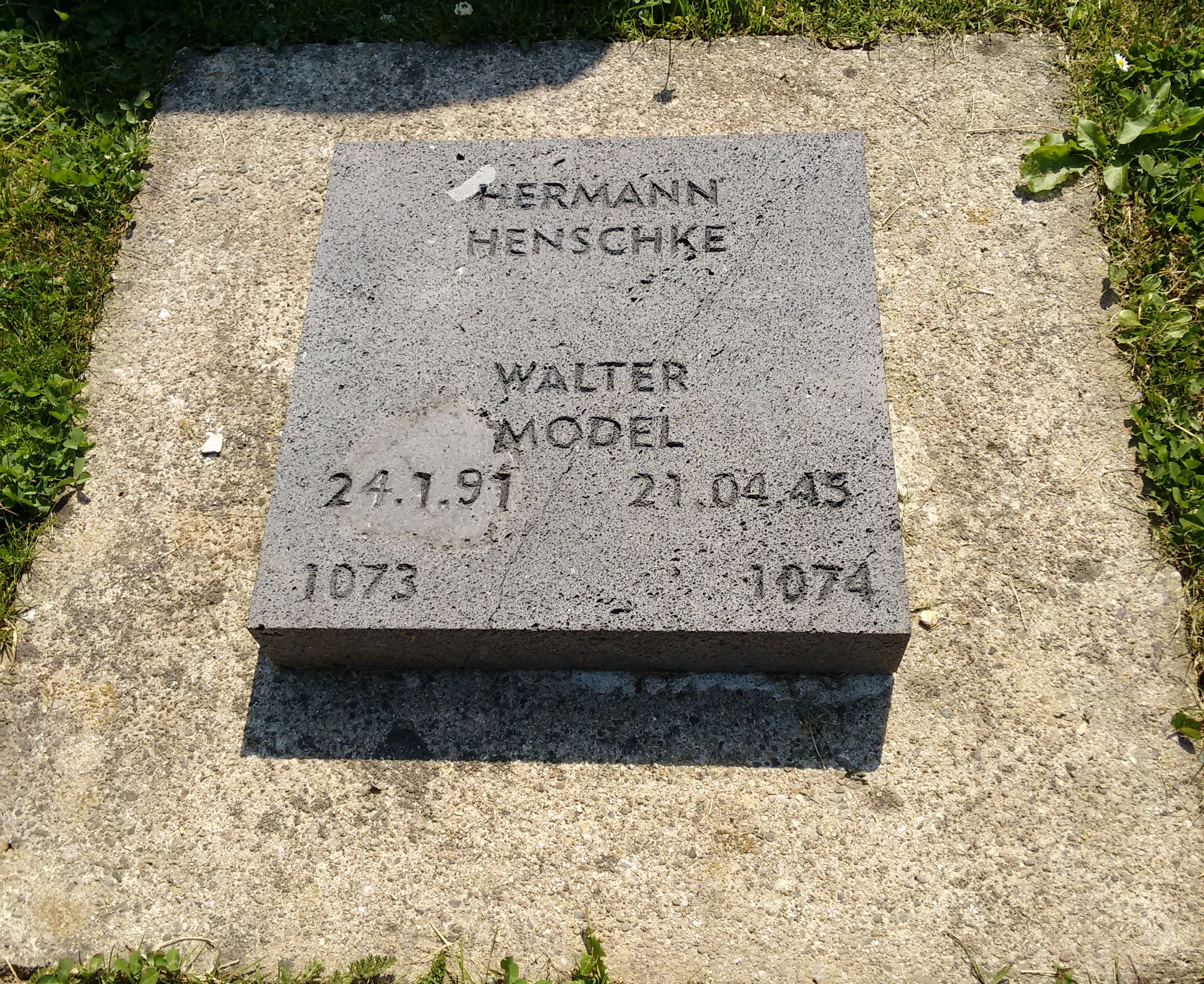
Model's grave at the military cemetery near Vossenack

Model's decision to dissolve his command ended the war for his men, but he had little desire to witness the aftermath of defeat. He said to his staff before dissolving his command: "Has everything been done to justify our actions in the light of history? What can there be left for a commander in defeat? In antiquity they took poison". His decision to commit suicide was sealed when he learned that the Soviets had indicted him for war crimes, specifically the deaths of 577,000 people in concentration camps in Latvia and the deportation of 175,000 others as slave labor. He shot himself in the head in a forest on 21 April 1945. The site of his death, between Duisburg and the village of Lintorf, is today part of the city of Ratingen.

Model was buried in the place where he shot himself. In 1955, his son, Hansgeorg Model, future brigadier general in the Bundeswehr, had Model's remains recovered from its field grave with the help from his former adjutant, Colonel Theodor Pilling, who buried him, and organized a reburial in the Soldatenfriedhof Vossenack, a German military cemetery in the Hürtgen Forest.

== Generalship ==
=== Limitations ===
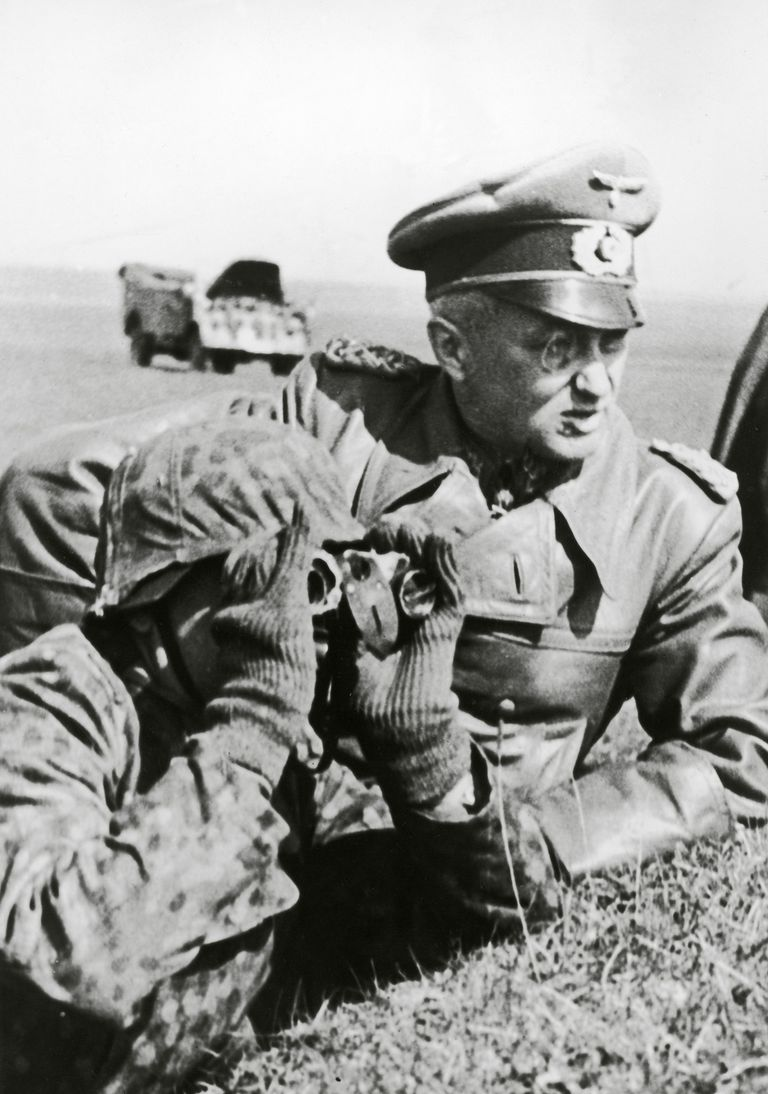
Model on the front.

Unlike Erwin Rommel, another field marshal who preferred to lead from the front, Walter Model was almost universally disliked by those who had to work with him. For example, when he was made commander of the XLI Panzer Corps in 1941, the entire corps staff asked to be transferred. He made a habit of being abusive and foul-mouthed, micromanaging his subordinates, changing plans without consultation, and bypassing the chain of command when it suited him. He was oblivious to the niceties of etiquette, often reprimanding or castigating his officers in public. When he departed Army Group North in March 1944 after being sent to Ukraine, the army group's chief of staff remarked, "the 'Swine' is gone". It was a reference to Model's nickname among his staffers, that he had earned during his time at XLI Panzer Corps, namely 'Frontline Pig' (Frontschwein).

He was considered a thorough and competent leader but known to "demand too much, and that too quickly", accepting no excuses for failure from either his own men or those who outranked him. His troops were said to have "suffered under his too-frequent absences and erratic, inconsistent demands", for he frequently lost sight of what was or was not practically possible. Yet his dislike of bureaucracy and his crude speech often made him well liked by many under his command. Model's Büffel movement, the retreat on the Hagen line during the Red Army's Oryol offensive and the improvisation during the restoration of the front at Army Group Center and in the west must count as examples of extraordinary retreat operations.

His command style had worked when he was leading a division or corps, but once promoted to command of an army, it created a loss of efficiency. The statement that he was no strategist can find merit as it was observed that he showed little inclination to contemplate those stretches of the front he did not command and therefore disregarded the strategic field as a whole.

=== Strengths ===
Model is regarded as being an excellent defensive commander of the Third Reich, and having an "outstanding talent for improvisation". At 3rd Panzer Division he was a pioneer in the use of Kampfgruppen, which would soon become standard practice for the Germans. He had a formidable memory and eye for detail, which allowed him to dominate his staff officers, especially those in charge of specialist areas such as artillery, transport and communications.

Before the war he was put in charge of analyzing technical advances at home and abroad and his enthusiasm for innovation earned him the nickname Armee Modernissimus ("the army modernization fanatic"). Model fought nearly all his battles in the northern and central parts of the Eastern Front; he was never tested on the steppes of southern Russia, where the open terrain would have made mobile warfare a more attractive proposition. Nevertheless, his defensive record indicated the value of his approach. At Rzhev, Oryol, in Galicia and in Estonia he stymied opponents who expected to overwhelm him.

He had the reputation of a ruthless commander, willing to inflict and take casualties to stabilize his front. The splitting up of units was continually practiced by Model and took place on the regimental and divisional level. The objective was always to give necessary reinforcements to the centers of gravity when no reserves were available. From an operational viewpoint this allowed Model to achieve defensive successes, which would not have been possible otherwise.

According to Newton, the sending of theatre or operational reserves into the line where the fighting was toughest was meant to preserve the units Model saw as organically tied to his own command. For example, he was given the elite Großdeutschland Division in September 1942, when his Ninth Army was under heavy attack during Operation Mars. Though he was told that the division was not to be broken up, Model nonetheless split it into battalions and companies, which he used to plug any gaps that appeared. Großdeutschland took nearly 10,000 casualties out of a strength of 18,000 men, and at one point was reportedly close to mutiny; but from Model's viewpoint these losses were acceptable because they meant that Ninth Army's own troops did not have to suffer them. According to Newton, Model reasoned that the elite units would be eventually withdrawn and reformed, an option which may not have been available to his regular army divisions. That said, he did not simply treat these reserve units as disposable. In early 1942, the Der Führer Regiment of the 2nd SS Division Das Reich was reduced to a handful of men in three weeks of bitter fighting—but in that time it also received reinforcements including 88 mm guns, artillery pieces, and StuG III assault guns, and Model himself visited the sector daily, calculating the minimum support that would be needed to hold off the Soviet attacks. Model was aware of the negative effects of the splitting up of units. For example, on 7 October 1944 he forbade the splitting up of regiments into autonomous battalions to be used outside the division.

Allied to this were his boundless determination and vigor and stubborn refusal to countenance defeat. He held himself to the same high standard as he held those around him, saying: "He who leads troops has no right to think about himself". His visits to the front may not have helped operational efficiency, but they energized his men, who consistently held him in much higher regard than did his officers. As commanding general of Ninth Army he was once recorded as personally leading a battalion attack against a Soviet position, pistol in hand. In combat he spared neither himself nor his subordinates. His peers respected his ability and iron will, even though they may have detested his personality. Guderian thought him the best choice to command Army Group Centre during the crisis of Operation Bagration; the Ninth Army's War Diary recorded, after he arrived at army group headquarters in Minsk: "The news of Field Marshal Model's arrival is noted with satisfaction and confidence."

Model was the master of the type of defense which can be called 'defense limited in time'; in which one defends as long as possible but then retreats to avoid breakthrough and destruction. He was always at the critical points and took away battlegroups or even single battalions from less threatened sectors. With these units holes were plugged at other locations or short counterattacks were executed and so opportunities were created for bigger solutions. Thus, a closed front was guaranteed while the mixing and tearing apart of units was viewed as the smaller evil. This exceptional skill at defensive tactics earned Model the nickname of Hitler's "Feuerwehrmann" ("fireman"), due to his repeated successful rescue of the Third Reich from dire military situations as the war began to turn against Germany.

== Assessment ==
=== Relationship with Hitler ===
Before the war, Model had been content to leave politics to the politicians, preferring instead to concentrate on military affairs. Despite this, he became one of the Wehrmacht's field marshals most closely identified with Hitler. Postwar opinions on him have varied. Some historians have called him "blindly loyal", a "convinced Nazi" or a "zealous disciple" of Hitler; others see in Model a coldly calculating opportunist who used the Führer to his advantage, whether or not he was committed to him or the ideals of Nazism; some regard him as "apolitical to a fault", loyal to Hitler but never sycophantic. The contradictions between his Lutheran upbringing and his later association with the Nazis have similarly been the subject of comment.

As one of the few German generals of middle class upbringing, Model's background appealed to Hitler, who distrusted the old Prussian aristocratic order that still dominated the Wehrmacht's officer corps. His defensive tactics were a much better fit to Hitler's instincts never to give ground, than talk of "elastic defense"—even if Model stood fast out of sheer necessity, and not due to fanaticism. His stubbornness, energy and ruthlessness were more qualities that Hitler found admirable, and Model's blunt and direct manner of speaking also made an impression.

In a much-noted incident, Model had to deal with an attempt by Hitler to interfere with his arrangements. A telephone call from Army Group Center's chief of staff on 19 January 1942 informed him that Hitler, having become nervous about the direct Soviet threat against Vyazma, had decided that XLVII Panzer Corps, 2nd SS Division Das Reich and 5th Panzer Division were not to be employed in the imminent counterattack but reserved for other use in the rearguard. Immediately, Model drove back from Rzhev to Vyazma in a raging blizzard and boarded a plane for East Prussia. Bypassing the figure of Kluge, his immediate superior, he sought a personal confrontation with Hitler. At first he attempted to lay out his reasons in the best, dispassionate General Staff manner, only to find the Führer unmoved by logic. Suddenly, glaring at Hitler through his monocle, Model brusquely demanded to know: "Mein Führer, who commands Ninth Army, you or I?".

Hitler, shocked at the defiance of his newest army commander, tried to find another solution favorable for both, but Model still was not satisfied. "Good, Model", the exasperated Hitler finally responded. "You do it as you please, but it will be your head at risk".

According to the Hitler's Table Talk recorded that night, the Führer commented: "I distrust officers who have exaggeratedly theoretical minds. I'd like to know what becomes of their theories at the moment of action". But when an officer "is worthy of command", he told Reichsführer-SS Heinrich Himmler, "he must be given the prerogatives corresponding to his functions".

Shortly after Model's departure to Rzhev area, Hitler also stated that: "Generals must be tough, pitiless men, as crabbed as mastiffs—gross-grained men, such as I have in the Party". Importantly, however, Model never challenged Hitler on political issues: a point that has been identified as the secret to their successful relationship.

Helped by his defensive successes, he thus gained Hitler's full trust and confidence; the Führer called him "my best field marshal" and (after Operation Bagration) "the savior of the Eastern Front". In turn, this granted Model a degree of flexibility available to no other German general. He frequently disputed, ignored or bypassed orders that he felt unsupportable: at Rzhev and Oryol he had constructed defensive fortifications in defiance of a ban, and his use of Shield and Sword tactics while at Army Group North proved to be simply a cover for a staged withdrawal. His relationships with his superiors were marked by dissembling, where what he wrote in his reports could bear little resemblance to what was actually happening.

=== Model and National Socialism ===
Many of Model's fellow officers considered him a Nazi. He frequently harangued his troops to have faith in the Führer and uphold the virtues of National Socialism. He accepted the offer of SS-Gruppenführer Hermann Fegelein to appoint a Waffen-SS officer as his adjutant at Army Group North in 1944, after the Heerespersonalamt had refused him an adjutant, and filled the Nationalsozialistischer Führungsoffizier post at Army Group B that had been vacant before his arrival. His habit of parroting the Führer's orders caused him to be viewed as a sycophant, even if he often undermined or ignored those orders in practice.

Following the 20 July Plot, Model was the first senior commander to reaffirm his loyalty to Hitler, yet he also refused to give up General Hans Speidel, his chief of staff at Army Group B who was implicated in the plot, to the Gestapo. Model was well aware of Speidel's political leanings, as were his predecessors at Army Group B, Erwin Rommel and Günther von Kluge. Like them, he shielded Speidel for as long as possible, while ignoring such treasonous talk as might take place.

While on the Eastern Front, Model showed no objection to the treatment of civilians by the SS in the areas under his command and oversaw Bandenbekämpfung (Nazi security warfare) operations, mostly while commanding the 9th Army. These operations, conducted by Wehrmacht troops as well as SS, were bloody, although not unusual by German Eastern Front standards. In conjunction with the ruthless scorched earth policies he followed during his retreats, they would lead to the Soviet Union declaring him a war criminal.

Despite this, while commanding Army Group Centre, he refused to dispatch troops to put down the Warsaw Uprising (a task that was carried out by the SS), viewing it as a rear-area matter. He stated that the revolt arose from the mistreatment of the Polish population by the Nazis and the army should have nothing to do with it. On the other hand, he showed no hesitation in clearing the Warsaw suburbs of Praga and Saska Kępa, through which vital supply lines ran.

Model's biographer, the military historian Steven Newton, argues that the best explanation for Model's behavior is that he was not necessarily a Nazi but an authoritarian militarist who saw in Hitler the strong leader that Germany needed. According to Newton, Model saw himself as the professional, apolitical soldier; he possessed a strong sense of German nationalism, with the accompanying tenets of racial prejudice against Slavs and Jews. This characterized many in the German officer corps, but in Model's case it was accompanied by a cynical willingness to placate the Nazi regime to expedite his own goals.

The historian Gerhard Weinberg states that Model had benefited from the hastening of the evolution that occurred in the relationship of Hitler to the military following the defeat at Stalingrad. Hitler had always resented his dependence on a professional higher officer corps whom he hoped to replace at the earliest opportunity with men more ideologically attuned to National Socialism. After Stalingrad, Hitler relieved his generals with greater frequency, while pushing up into the higher ranks those "whose dedication to extreme National Social views made them more congenial to his way of thinking". Weinberg includes Model, alongside Ferdinand Schörner and Heinz Guderian, in this group.

The historian Ben H. Shepherd opines that Model was "not the most fanatical Nazi". The reasons Hitler favored him lay with Model's middle-class background and his ruthlessly utilitarian warfare style. Like Newton, Forczyk suspects that postwar testimonies of Model's negative aspects are exaggerated, considering that Model was not very charismatic (although he actually got along well with most of his staff) and already dead; many staff officers wanted to promote commanders who allowed them a more agreeable life-style, instead of dragging them through snow and mud like Model (in one case, when discussing Manstein's replacement by Model, Friedrich von Mellenthin made resentful remarks about Model's personality and abilities, although he had never served on Model's staff). According to Forczyk, Model only cared about politics if this would give him more troops.

== Summary of career ==
=== Dates of rank ===
- Leutnant – 22 August 1910
- Oberleutnant – 25 February 1915
- Hauptmann – March 1918
- Major – October 1929
- Oberstleutnant – 1932
- Oberst – 1 October 1934
- Generalmajor – 1 March 1938
- Generalleutnant – 1 April 1940
- General der Panzertruppe – 26 October 1941
- Generaloberst – 28 February 1942
- Generalfeldmarschall – 30 March 1944

=== Service history ===
- 1909: Officer cadet training
- 1910: 52nd Infantry Regiment von Alvensleben
- 1917: Staff assignments
- 1925: Commanding officer, 9th Company, 8th Infantry Regiment
- 1928: Staff officer, 3rd Division, Berlin
- 1930: Staff officer, Section 4 (Training), Truppenamt, Berlin
- 1932: Chief of Staff, Reich Kuratorium for Youth Fitness
- 1933: Battalion commander, 2nd Infantry Regiment
- 1935: Head of Section 8, General Staff, Berlin
- 1938: Chief of Staff, IV Corps
- 1939: Chief of Staff, Sixteenth Army
- 1940: Commander, 3rd Panzer Division
- 1941: Commander, XLI Panzer Corps
- 1942: Commander, Ninth Army
- January–March 1944: Commander, Army Group North
- March–June 1944: Commander, Army Group North Ukraine
- June–August 1944: Commander, Army Group Centre
- August–September 1944: Commander-in-Chief, OB West
- August 1944 – April 1945: Commander, Army Group B

=== Awards and decorations ===
- Iron Cross of 1914
  - 2nd Class: 20 September 1914
  - 1st Class: 19 October 1915
- Military Merit Order, 4th class with Swords (Bavaria, 29 March 1915)
- Knight's Cross of the Royal House Order of Hohenzollern with Swords (26 February 1917)
- Military Merit Cross, 2nd class (Mecklenburg-Schwerin, 22 November 1917)
- Military Merit Cross, 3rd class with War Decoration (Austria-Hungary, 22 November 1917)
- Ottoman War Medal (Turkish: Harp Madalyası), better known as the "Gallipoli Star" or the "Iron Crescent" (22 November 1917)
- Wound Badge (1918) in black (27 August 1918)
- Spanish Cross (31 May 1939)
- Clasp to the Iron Cross (1939)
  - 2nd Class: 22 September 1939
  - 1st Class: 2 October 1939
- Panzer Badge in Silver (29 August 1941)
- Wound Badge (1939) in Gold (25 May 1942)
- Eastern Front Medal (15 July 1942)
- Knight's Cross of the Iron Cross with Oak Leaves, Swords and Diamonds
  - Knight's Cross on 9 July 1941 as Generalleutnant and commander of the 3. Panzer-Division
  - 74th Oak Leaves on 18 February 1942 as General der Panzertruppe and commanding general of the XXXXI. Panzerkorps
  - 28th Swords on 2 April 1943 as Generaloberst and commander-in-chief of 9. Armee
  - 17th Diamonds on 17 August 1944 as Generalfeldmarschall and commander-in-chief of Heeresgruppe Mitte

== Notes ==
Military offices
Preceded by General der Panzertruppe Horst Stumpff	Commander of 3. Panzer-Division; 13 November 1940 – 2 October 1941	Succeeded by General der Panzertruppe Hermann Breith
Preceded by Generalleutnant Otto-Ernst Ottenbacher	Commander of XXXXI Panzerkorps; 1 November 1941 – 10 January 1942	Succeeded by General der Panzertruppe Josef Harpe
Preceded by Generaloberst Adolf Strauss	Commander of 9th Army; 15 January 1942 – 3 November 1943	Succeeded by Generaloberst Josef Harpe
Preceded by General der Infanterie Heinrich Clößner	Commander of 2. Panzer-Armee; 6 August 1943 – 14 August 1943	Succeeded by Generaloberst Dr. Lothar Rendulic
Preceded by Generalfeldmarschall Georg von Küchler	Commander of Heeresgruppe Nord; 9 January 1944 – 31 March 1944	Succeeded by Generaloberst Georg Lindemann
Preceded by Generalfeldmarschall Ernst Busch	Commander of Heeresgruppe Mitte; 28 June 1944 – 16 August 1944	Succeeded by Generaloberst Georg Hans Reinhardt
Preceded by Generalfeldmarschall Günther von Kluge	Oberbefehlshaber West; 16 August 1944 – 3 September 1944	Succeeded by Generalfeldmarschall Gerd von Rundstedt
Preceded by Generalfeldmarschall Günther von Kluge	Commander of Heeresgruppe B 17 August 1944 – 21 April 1945	Succeeded by none
