= Army Group North Ukraine =

Major formation of the German army in World War II

- German: Heeresgruppe Nordukraine
- Active: 5 April 1944 – September 1944
- Country: Nazi Germany
- Branch: Army Wehrmacht)
- Type: Army Group
- Size: 400,542 (Spring 1944)
- Engagements: World War II

Commanders
- Notable commanders: Walter Model

The Army Group North Ukraine (German: Heeresgruppe Nordukraine) was a major formation of the German army in World War II.

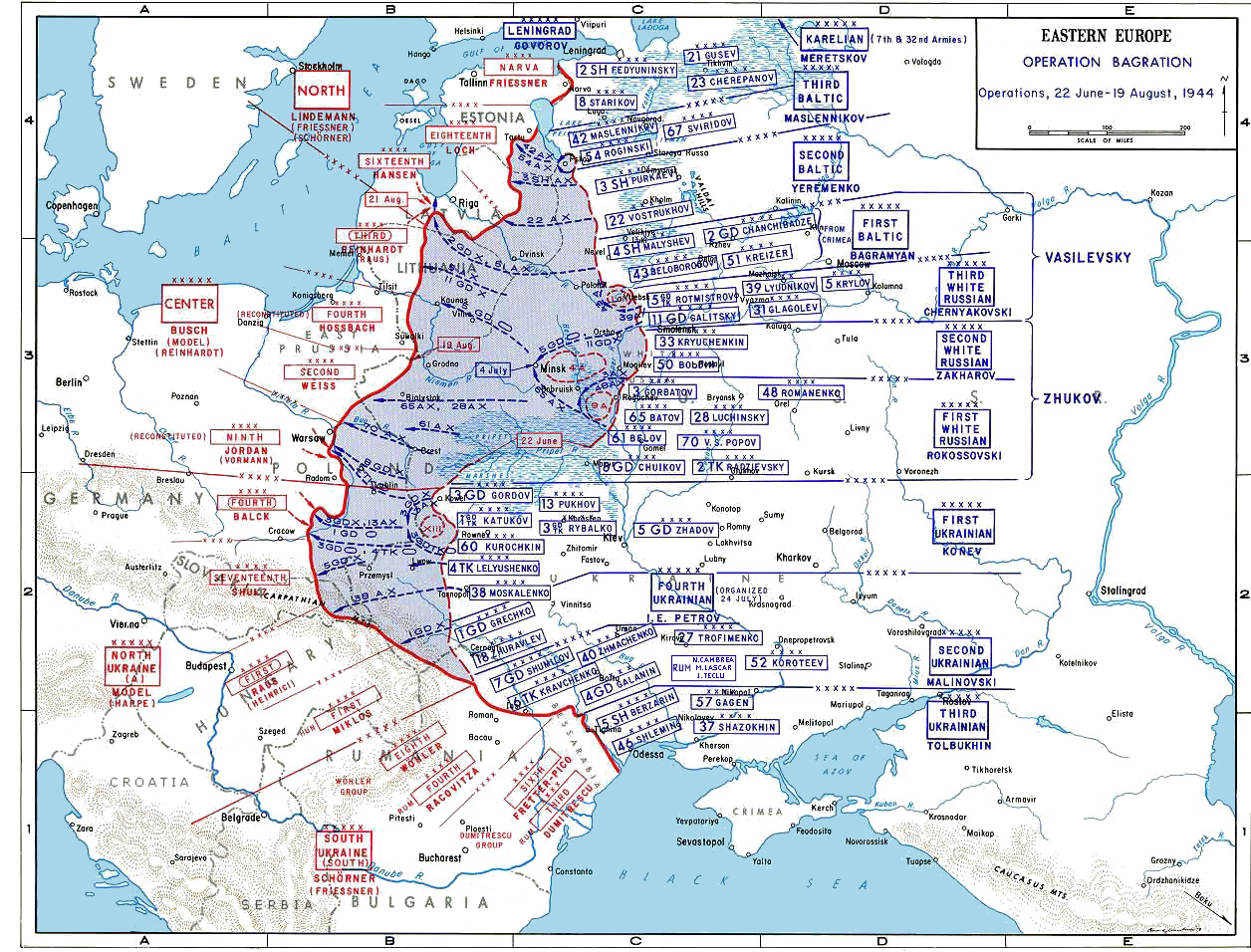
German and Soviet deployments on the Eastern Front, June to August 1944, showing Army Group North Ukraine at lower left.

== History ==
Army Group North Ukraine was created on 5 April 1944 by renaming Army Group South under Field Marshal Walter Model. In April 1944 it consisted of 1st Panzer Army and 4th Panzer Army. In the summer of 1944 it opposed the Red Army's 1st Ukrainian Front during the Lvov-Sandomir strategic offensive operation (13 July - 29 August 1944). In August 1944 the 4th Panzer Army and the 17th Army defended between Carpathian Mountains and the Pripyet swamps in Galicia. In September 1944 it was renamed to Army Group A.

== Order of battle ==
The composition of the Army Group on 15 July 1944 was:

- 4th Panzer Army
  - XXXXVI Panzer Corps
  - XXXXII Corps
  - LVI Panzer Corps
  - VIII Corps
- 1st Panzer Army
  - LIX Corps
  - XXIV Panzer Corps
  - XXXXVIII Panzer Corps
  - III Panzer Corps
  - 20th Panzer Grenadier Division
  - 14th SS Grenadier Division
- 1st Hungarian Army
  - VI Hungarian Corps
  - XI Corps
  - VII Hungarian Corps
  - 2nd Hungarian Mountain Brigade
  - 19th Hungarian Reserve Division
  - 2nd Hungarian Panzer Division
  - Kampfgruppe, 19th SS Panzer Grenadier Division

== Commanders ==
No.	Portrait	Commander	Took office	Left office	Time in office
1	Walter Model	Generalfeldmarschall; Walter Model (1891–1945)	31 March 1944	16 August 1944	138 days
2	Josef Harpe	Generaloberst; Josef Harpe (1887–1968)	16 August 1944	23 September 1944	38 days

Chief of Staff

No.	Portrait	Chief of Staff	Took office	Left office	Time in office
1	Theodor Busse	Generalleutnant; Theodor Busse (1897–1986)	1 April 1944	10 July 1944	100 days
2	Wolf-Dietrich von Xylander	Generalmajor; Wolf-Dietrich von Xylander (1903–1945)	10 July 1944	23 September 1944	75 days
