= 82nd Infantry Division (Wehrmacht) =

- 82. Infanterie-Division
- Active: December 1939 – May 1944
- Country: Nazi Germany
- Branch: Army
- Type: Infantry
- Size: Division
- Engagements: Kamenets-Podolsky pocket

The 82nd Infantry Division (German: 82. Infanteriedivision) was a German Army infantry division in World War II. The 82nd was part of the sixth Aufstellungswelle of German infantry divisions.

== Operational history ==
The 82nd Infantry Division was raised in December 1939 and was first deployed into action the following May during the invasion of France and the low countries.

Returning to Germany in December 1940, they were redeployed into the Netherlands the following month. In May, the division was separated - elements of the 82nd were to remain as an occupational force in the Netherlands, while the rest were to invade the Soviet Union. In June 1941, in preparation for the then-upcoming invasion, Major General Josef Lehmann was promoted to Lieutenant General. In December 1942, the occupational elements would move to the Eastern front.

In mid-January 1943, the Red Army launched a counteroffensive targeted on the city of Voronezh. During the Battle of Voronezh, Lieutenant General Alfred Bäntsch was killed; he was replaced by Lieutenant General Karl Faulenbach.

In July 1943, the division took part in the Battle of Kursk as a component of General of the Infantry Erich Straube's XIII Corps, which in itself was a portion of the 2nd Army. In December, Major General Hans-Walter Heyne was promoted to Lieutenant General.

In early 1944, the division was encircled by Soviet Armed Forces near Kiev during the Battle of the Korsun-Cherkassy Pocket. Although it managed to escape from the Soviets, it sustained such heavy casualties that it was reduced to being a designated "Division Group", absorbed by the 254th Infantry Division.

== Components ==
- 158th Infantry Regiment
- 166th Infantry Regiment
- 168th Infantry Regiment
- 182nd Artillery Regiment
- 182nd Bicycle Squadron
- 182nd Tank Destroyer Battalion
- 182nd Engineer Battalion
- 182nd Signals Battalion
- 182nd Divisional Supply Troops

== Commanders ==
note
All Generals are listed with the rank they had when assigned to divisional command.

- Major General Josef Lehmann (1 December 1939 – 1 April 1942)
- Major General Friedrich Hoßbach (1 April – 6 July 1942)
- Lieutenant General Alfred Bäntsch (6 July 1942 – 31 January 1943)
- Lieutenant General Karl Faulenbach (31 January – 15 Mar 1943)
- Major General Hans-Walter Heyne (15 March – April 1943)
- Colonel Friedrich-August Weinknecht (April – May 1943)
- Lieutenant General Hans-Walter Heyne (May 1943 – 10 May 1944)
