= Hans-Walter Heyne =

Hans-Walter Heyne-Hedersleben
- Born: 10 January 1894
- Died: 29 August 1967 (aged 73)
- Military career
- Allegiance: Nazi Germany
- Branch: Army (Wehrmacht)
- Rank: Generalleutnant
- Commands: 82nd Infantry Division; 6th Infantry Division
- Conflicts: Bobruysk Offensive
- Awards: Knight's Cross of the Iron Cross

Hans-Walter Heyne-Hedersleben (10 January 1894 – 29 August 1967) was a general in the Wehrmacht of Nazi Germany. He was a recipient of the Knight's Cross of the Iron Cross. Heyne surrendered to the Soviet troops in June 1944 during the Bobruysk Offensive. Convicted as a war criminal in the Soviet Union, he was held until 1955.

== Awards and decorations ==
- Knight's Cross of the Iron Cross on 4 April 1943 as Oberst and commander of Artillerie-Regiment 182

Military offices
Preceded by Generalleutnant Karl Faulenbach	Commander of 82. Infanterie-Division; 15 March 1943 – April 1943	Succeeded by Generalleutnant Friedrich-August Weinknecht
Preceded by Generalleutnant Friedrich-August Weinknecht	Commander of 82. Infanterie-Division; May 1943 – 1 June 1944	Succeeded by Unit disbanded after heavy losses
Preceded by Oberst Günther Klammt	Commander of 6. Infanterie-Division; 1 June 1944 – 30 June 1944	Succeeded by Unit Disbanded
