= Friedrich-August Weinknecht =

- Born: 5 October 1895
- Died: 26 October 1964 (aged 69)
- Military career
- Allegiance: Nazi Germany
- Branch: Army
- Service years: 1914–1945
- Rank: Generalleutnant
- Commands: 82nd Infantry Division; 79th Infantry Division
- Conflicts: Second Jassy–Kishinev Offensive
- Awards: Knight's Cross of the Iron Cross

Friedrich-August Weinknecht (5 October 1895 – 26 October 1964) was a general in the Wehrmacht of Nazi Germany during World War II who commanded several infantry divisions. He was a recipient of the Knight's Cross of the Iron Cross. Weinknecht surrendered to the Red Army in August 1944 during Soviet Jassy–Kishinev Offensive.

== Awards and decorations ==
- Knight's Cross of the Iron Cross on 15 July 1944 as Generalmajor and commander of 79. Infanterie-Division

Military offices
| Preceded by Generalleutnant Hans-Walter Heyne | Commander of 82. Infanterie-Division; April 1943 - May 1943 | Succeeded by Generalleutnant Hans-Walter Heyne |
| Preceded by Oberst Andreas von Aulock | Commander of 79. Infanterie-Division; October 1943 - 29 August 1944 | Succeeded by Generalmajor Erich Weber |
