= Trzebiełuch =

- Village
- Location within Poland
- Coordinates: 53°24′N 18°40′E
- Country: Poland
- Voivodeship: Kuyavian-Pomeranian
- County: Chełmno
- Gmina: Stolno
- Time zone: UTC+1 (CET)
  - Summer (DST): UTC+2 (CEST)
- Vehicle registration: CCH

Trzebiełuch [tʂɛˈbjɛwux] is a village in the administrative district of Gmina Stolno, within Chełmno County, Kuyavian-Pomeranian Voivodeship, in north-central Poland. It is located in Chełmno Land within the historic region of Pomerania.

== Transport ==
The Polish National road 55 passes through the village, and the A1 motorway runs nearby, east of the village.

== Notable residents ==
- Karl Strecker (1884-1973), Wehrmacht general
