= Samuel W. Mitcham =

American writer of military history (born 1949)

Samuel W. Mitcham Jr.
- Born: 1949 (age 76–77); Mer Rouge, Louisiana
- Education: Northeast Louisiana University, University of Tennessee
- Occupations: Author, military historian
- Writing career
- Language: English
- Genres: Non-fiction; Military history

Samuel W. Mitcham Jr. is an American author and military historian who specializes in the German war effort during World War II and the Confederate war effort during the American Civil War. He is the author of more than 40 books and has collaborated with other historians such as Gene Mueller.

== Personal life ==
Mitcham was born in 1949, in the Louisianian village of Mer Rouge. He currently lives in Monroe. Mitcham is married and is the father of two children.

== Education and career ==
Mitcham participated in the Vietnam War where he served as a helicopter pilot for the United States Army. He studied journalism at Northeast Louisiana University and science at the North Carolina State. Mitcham earned his Ph.D. in geography in 1986 from University of Tennessee. His dissertation at Tennessee was titled The origin and evolution of the southwestern Louisiana rice region, 1880-1920. Mitcham taught geography, historical geography and military history at Henderson State University, Georgia Southern University, and the University of Louisiana at Monroe. He has been consulted by the CBS, the BBC, the NPR and The History Channel. He is also a former visiting professor in the United States Military Academy.

Mitcham has written for several websites, journals and think-tanks such as the Journal of Soviet Military Studies and the Abbeville Institute.

== Authorship and reception ==
Mitcham is the author of more than 40 books on military history, including orders of battle, operational studies and prosopography, focusing on the careers of the Wehrmacht and Waffen-SS figures, as well as on Confederate figures.

His works have been translated into at least 8 languages, including German, Polish, Chinese, and Russian among several others.

=== Why Hitler?: The Genesis of the Nazi Reich ===
In Why Hitler?: The Genesis of the Nazi Reich (1996), Mitcham attempts to explain why the Germans elected Adolf Hitler as Chancellor of Germany.

The book received a mixed review by historian Joachim Whaley in the Journal of European Studies. Whaley wrote that the book is "a fairly standard account of Germany in the 1920s and the rise of Hitler". He concludes that this is a book for the general reader, in search of what he calls a "relatively undemanding enlightenment", but he also states that experts "who wish to engage in the serious historical debates of this subject" would have to look elsewhere.

=== The Desert Fox in Normandy: Rommel's Defense of Fortress Europe ===
In The Desert Fox in Normandy: Rommel's Defense of Fortress Europe (1997), Mitcham focuses on the career and activities of Erwin Rommel while he served in Europe from November 1943 until his death in October 1944. He also explores some "what-if" scenarios in relation to Rommel.

The book received a positive review by the staff of the World History Group, who called it "a well-written and concientiously researched historical work". It also received a mostly positive review by historian Steven S. Minniear in The Journal of Military History. Minniear wrote that the book "would be a valuable addition to any collection of World War II works, both for its masterful coverage of Axis military organizational, operational and tactical activities, as well as for its excellent minibiographies of important German military and naval officers, found in each chapter's endnotes. The short biographies alone are sufficient reason to acquire this book".

=== Retreat to the Reich: The German Defeat in France, 1944 ===
In Retreat to the Reich (2000), Mitcham gives an account of Operation Overlord from the German perspective.

Publishers Weekly wrote that the book would be fascinating for specialists and determined readers, but it could be tedious for the lay reader. The book received a positive review by historian Lee Fullenkamp in the Parameters Journal of the U.S. Army War College. Fullenkamp wrote that it "provides those interested in World War II with a meticulously researched and highly detailed account of German forces fighting in western France in the summer of 1944 from the perspective of those who were fated to stand against the greatest armada in the history of warfare".

=== Defenders of Fortress Europe: The Untold Story of the German Officers during the Allied Invasion ===
In Defenders of Fortress Europe: The Untold Story of the German Officers during the Allied Invasion (2009), Mitcham utilized over 200 previously unreleased personnel files to build a picture of the German command class facing the Allied invasion. He focuses on personal and political differences among the officer class, which ultimately contributed to the defeat of the German forces in Normandy. Mitcham also explores their motivations, often highly self-serving. He shows that the in-fighting took on political as well as class dimensions, as illustrated by the power struggle between Gerd von Rundstedt, the nominal commander in the West, and Erwin Rommel, the de facto leader in Normandy.

The book received a mixed review by historian Bradley Nicols in H-Net, noting its "excellent job [at] describing battles and establishing links between the social, political, and religious background of German officers and their actions in combat", but criticizing its methodology and a few other aspects such as its adherence to the myth of the clean Wehrmacht.

=== Panzers in Winter: Hitler's Army and the Battle of the Bulge ===
In Panzers in Winter: Hitler's Army and the Battle of the Bulge (2006), Mitcham approaches the Battle of the Bulge from a vantage point and offers a new perspective. Mitcham makes it clear that he wrote the book from a German point of view, but he draws from both German and American sources. He argues that responsibility for the American defeat in the battle lies closer to the Americans themselves rather than to German advantages. Mitcham also gives great focus to the 18th Volksgrenadier Division.

The book received a positive review by historian Henry Staruk in H-Net. Staruk wrote of it as "compelling" noting its strengths and concluding that "Mitcham's discovery of new German sources allows for a wealth of new voices, combining the military situation with the political, and his somewhat peculiar arrangement ultimately makes those voices more clearly defined. The volume presents a history that will engage specialists as well as casual readers not deeply versed in military history".

=== Eagles of the Third Reich: Men of the Luftwaffe in World War II ===
In Eagles of the Third Reich: Men of the Luftwaffe in World War II (2007), Mitcham writes about the rise and fall of the Luftwaffe from the perspective of its top leaders, concentrating on problems of organization, policy and aircraft production rather than battles and campaigns.

Publishers Weekly wrote a positive review of the book, calling it "insightful" and "well-researched". Herman Reinhold, a Detachment Commander at the United States Air Force, also wrote a positive review of the book in Air Power History, noting that it does a good job of discussing Luftwaffe leaders and their relationships.

=== Crumbling Empire: The German Defeat in the East, 1944 ===
In Crumbling Empire: The German Defeat in the East, 1944 (2001), Mitcham wrote about the World War II battles of 1944 from the Battle of Stalingrad to the Siege of Budapest.

=== Hitler's Commanders: Officers of the Wehrmacht, the Luftwaffe, the Kriegsmarine and the Waffen-SS ===
In Hitler's Commanders (2012), Mitcham along with Gene Mueller wrote brief profiles of several lesser-known Nazi commanders.

Publishers Weekly wrote a positive review of the book, calling it "a sterling introduction for anyone interested in how the men who fought for Hitler ticked".

=== The German Defeat in the East, 1944-1945 ===
In The German Defeat in the East, 1944-1945 (2001), Mitcham attempts to explain the final months of World War II on the Eastern Front, beginning with the Dnieper–Carpathian offensive and Operation Bagration, and ending with the Battle of Romania and the Siege of Budapest.

The book received a mostly negative review by historian Lee Baker in The Journal of Slavic Military Studies who wrote that Mitcham utilized outdated secondary sources and provided a single-sided German perspective. Baker noted that the book's greatest strength is including "a good deal of operational detail without becoming overwhelmingly tedious or trivial" and wrote that it might be a good place to begin for readers unfamiliar with the Battle of Moscow, Battle of Stalingrad and other key battles of the Eastern Front. Nevertheless, Baker describes the book as "not about the defeat of Germany on the eastern front by the Red Army, but rather a tale of German heroism and bungled orders from German command structures". He further characterises the book as "very old-fashioned" and relying "solely upon German sources or obsolete interpretations from the Cold War era".

=== The Rise of the Wehrmacht: The German Armed Forces and World War II ===
In The Rise of the Wehrmacht (2008), Mitcham gives a military history of Germany and its war effort from the fall of the House of Hohenzollern in 1918 to the Battle of Stalingrad in 1943 with a focus on the Wehrmacht.

Historian Keith Eubank, specializing in WWII, wrote a positive review of the book in CHOICE: Current Reviews for Academic Libraries. He highly recommends it, calling it "very readable" and "an excellent addition to all collections dealing with WWII".

Historian James Corum wrote a negative review of the book in The Journal of Military History, stating that there is nothing original in Mitcham's book and that "Of the many histories of the Wehrmacht that I have read and reviewed over many years this ranks as perhaps the worst".

=== Richard Taylor and the Red River Campaign of 1864 ===
In Richard Taylor and the Red River Campaign of 1864 (2012), Mitcham wrote about Confederate general Richard Taylor and the 1864 Red River Campaign.

Historian Kyle Sinisi, writing in the Civil War Book Review, gave the book a mostly negative review, writing that there are several errors in writing, research and interpretation. He faults Mitcham for not revealing archival research in a book full of "printed primary and secondary sources". However, he also states that the book is "not without some virtue" noting its "colorful detail and clear descriptions of complicated movements". On the other hand, historian Michael Thomas Smith, writing in the Journal of Southern History, gave the book a mostly positive review, stating that Mitcham's conclusion, (i.e., that the ultimate significance of the Red River campaign was to delay William Sherman's capture of Atlanta, which was a key city because it might've cost Abraham Lincoln the re-election in 1864), "sensible and judicious" albeit lacking in novelty. Smith concludes that "General readers interested in the Civil War will likely enjoy this book".

=== It Wasn't About Slavery: Exposing the Great Lie of the Civil War ===
In It Wasn't About Slavery: Exposing the Great Lie of the Civil War (2020), Mitcham advances the neo-Confederate view that the American Civil War was not, as most historians assess, about slavery. He calls the conflict "the War for Southern Self-Determination".

Gene Kizer Jr., a neo-Confederate historian who has authored books defending the Confederate States of America, wrote a 15-part positive review of the book. He stated that it doesn't solely address the issue of slavery, but goes beyond it, and that: "It is well argued and documented so that it is hard to question any of it".

=== Other works ===
Among his other works, is Bust Hell Wide Open: The Life of Nathan Bedford Forrest (2016), presenting a flattering biography of Nathan Bedford Forrest, a prominent Confederate Army general and the first Grand Wizard of the Ku Klux Klan. The book received a positive review by author James Rutledge Roesch in the Abbeville Institute.

== Selected works ==
=== World War II ===
- With Gene Mueller: Hitler's Commanders. Cooper Publishing Group, London 1992, ISBN 0-85052-308-7.
- Why Hitler?: The Genesis of the Nazi Reich. Praeger, Westport 1996, ISBN 0-275-95485-4.
- The Rise of the Wehrmacht: The German Armed Forces and World War II. Praeger Security International, Westport 1998, ISBN 978-0-275-99641-3.
- Retreat to the Reich: The German Defeat in France, 1944. Praeger, Westport 2000, ISBN 0-275-96857-X.
- The Panzer Legions: A Guide to the German Army Tank Divisions of World War II and Their Commanders. Greenwood Press, Westport 2001, ISBN 0-313-31640-6.
- Hitler's Field Marshals and Their Battles. Cooper Square Press, New York 2001, ISBN 0-8154-1130-8.
- Rommel's Lieutenants: The Men who Served the Desert Fox, France, 1940. Praeger Security International, Westport 2006, ISBN 0-275-99185-7.
- Defenders of Fortress Europe: The Untold Story of the German Officers During the Allied Invasion. Potomac Books, Washington, D.C. 2009, ISBN 978-1-59797-274-1.
- Eagles of the Third Reich: Leaders of the Luftwaffe in the Second World War. Crécy Publications, Manchester 2010, ISBN 978-0-85979-149-6.
- Blitzkrieg No Longer: The German Wehrmacht in battle, 1943. Pen and Sword Books, Barnsley 2010, ISBN 978-1-84884-302-8.
- The Death of Hitler's War Machine: The Final Destruction of the Wehrmacht. Regnery History 2021, ISBN 978-1684511389.

=== American Civil War ===
- Richard Taylor and the Red River Campaign of 1864, Pelican Publishing Press, 2012, ISBN 978-1455616336
- Bust Hell Wide Open: The Life of Nathan Bedford Forrest, Regnery History, 2016, ISBN 978-1684510306.
- Vicksburg: The Bloody Siege that Turned the Tide of the Civil War. Regnery History, Washington, DC 2018, ISBN 978-1-62157-639-6.
- The Greatest Lynching in American History: New York 1863, Shotwell Publishing LLC 2020, ISBN 978-1947660267.
- It Wasn't About Slavery: Exposing the Great Lie of the Civil War, Regnery History, 2020, ISBN 978-1684512232.
- The Encyclopedia of Confederate Generals: The Definitive Guide to the 426 leaders of the South's War Effort, Regnery History, 2022, ISBN 978-1684512447
