= Operation Herbstnebel =

1944 German proposal during the Battle of the Bulge

Unternehmen Herbstnebel ("Operation Autumn Mist") was an offensive planned by German Field Marshal Walter Model and his Army Group B operational staff in late 1944 during World War II. It envisaged a German Army attack targeting the Allied forces in eastern Belgium and Luxembourg, east of the Meuse River.

== Concept of the operation ==
Herbstnebel was created as an alternative to Wacht am Rhein, Adolf Hitler's plan to seize Antwerp and bottle up all Allied forces in Belgium and the Netherlands. Model, along with all the other senior commanders involved, believed this was unachievable given Germany's limited resources at the time. Thus he devised a less ambitious scenario that would not cross the Meuse, but still deliver a sharp defeat to the Allies. Like Wacht am Rhein, Model's attack would be launched in the Ardennes sector, but would then turn north instead of continuing west and northwest.

Field Marshal Gerd von Rundstedt commanding OB West, had come up with a similar plan, Fall Martin ("Case Martin"). Von Rundstedt's plan called for a two-pronged attack instead of a single thrust, but in both plans the area of operations remained east of the Meuse. Model and von Rundstedt combined their plans to present a joint solution to Hitler, called by Model the "small solution". Hitler rejected it in favour of his "big solution", which formed the basis for the Battle of the Bulge.

Confusingly, Operation Wacht am Rhein was itself renamed Herbstnebel in early December, although it remains most well known by its original name. The actual plan of attack was unchanged.

== See also ==
- Battle of the Bulge
