= Gene Mueller =

American mayor, historian, and author (born 1942)

Gene A Mueller (born February 28, 1942) was the Mayor of Lewiston, Idaho for ten years from 1982 to 1992 and is an American historian and author.

Mueller was born in Milwaukee, Wisconsin and is considered an expert in two areas of history, American Nez Perce Indian Culture and 20th Century Europe, specifically Hitler's generals. He has published several books. He has taught at the Lewis–Clark State College in Lewiston, Henderson State University at Arkadelphia, Arkansas, and Texas A&M University–Texarkana.

== Education ==
He has the following degrees:

- B.A., University of Missouri–Kansas City
- M.A., University of Oregon
- Ph.D., University of Idaho

== Books ==
- Hitler's Commanders: Officers of the Wehrmacht, the Luftwaffe, the Kriegsmarine, and the Waffen-SS, Samuel W. Mitcham, Gene Mueller, ISBN 0-8128-4014-3, Publisher: Rowman & Littlefield
- Wilhelm Keitel: The Forgotten Field Marshal, Gene Mueller, ISBN 0-8154-1294-0, Publisher: Cooper Square Publishers
- Lewiston: From packtrains and tent saloons to highways and brick stores : a century of progress, 1861-1962, Gene Mueller, ASIN B0006XY46W
- Lewiston: A pictorial history, Gene Mueller, ASIN B00070YYD2
- Natives, migrants, and immigrants: Lewiston's cultural heritage and early society, Gene Mueller, ASIN B0006XY462

== Personal ==
Dr. Gene Mueller is married to Kathleen C. Mueller, and has three sons, Barry, Jason, and Matthew.
