= 10th Guards Motor Rifle Division =

Motor rifle division of the Soviet military

52nd Rifle Division (1935 – Dec. 1941) 10th Guards Rifle Division (Dec. 1941 – 1946) 10th Guards Mountain Division (1946–1962) 10th Guards Motor Rifle Division (1962–1991)
- Soviet Guards badge
- Active: 1941–1991
- Country: Soviet Union
- Branch: Red Army / Soviet Army
- Type: Division
- Role: Infantry
- Part of: Karelian Front; 2nd Belorussian Front; Transcaucasus Military District
- Nickname: "Pechengskii"
- Engagements: World War II; Battle of Petsamo; Arctic Defensive; Petsamo-Kirkenes Operation; East Pomeranian Offensive; Konitz-Köslin Offensive Operation

The 10th Guards Motor Rifle Division was a division of the Soviet Ground Forces. The full name of its predecessor division was the 10th Guards Rifle Pechengskii, Twice Order of the Red Banner, Order of Alexander Nevsky, Order of the Red Star Division. (Russian: 10ая гвардейская стрелковая Печенгский, дважды орденом Красного Знамени, орденом Александра Невского, орденом Красной звезда дивизия.) The 10th Guards Rifle Division was formed from the 52nd Rifle Division in late 1941.

== History ==
In 1939 the 52nd Rifle Division took part in the Soviet invasion of Poland, then during the Winter War in the Battle of Petsamo.

At the outbreak of Operation Barbarossa the division was still in the far north, near Murmansk. As part of 14th Army it defended against the German Mountain Corps Norway's assault towards the port which began on 19 June 1941, and was finally brought to a halt along the Litsa River line on 21 Sept. In recognition of its role in the successful defense of Murmansk, the division was renamed and reorganized as the 10th Guards Rifle Division on 26 Dec, with the following order of battle:

- 24th Guards Rifle Regiment
- 28th Guards Rifle Regiment
- 35th Guards Rifle Regiment
- 29th Guards Artillery Regiment

It was one of the few Guards formations formed or deployed by the Red Army in the Arctic during the war.

During the defense the 10th Guards was engaged in 150 fights of local importance. At the end of April 1942, it began a counterattack which was unsuccessful. The counterattack failed due to severe weather conditions and a strong snowstorm on the previous day. Along with most units of the static Karelian Front, during the next two years the division operated at minimal strength in its rifle units in order to conserve manpower for the main front to the south; however it also formed a divisional ski battalion for rear area security.

In Sept. – Oct. 1944 the division was subordinated to 131st Rifle Corps, itself reporting to 14th Army. Beginning on 7 October 1944, it participated in the Petsamo-Kirkenes Operation and was in the first echelon advancing to the building on Mount Small Karikvayvish and seized a bridgehead on the west bank of the Titovka River on 8 Oct. After four days of fighting for the Luostari on 14 Oct 10 Guards crossed the Pechenga River west of Kakkuri and participated in the liberation of Pechenga. After the liberation of Pechenga the division attacked Kirkenes, supported by the 378th Guards Heavy Self-Propelled Artillery Regiment. Once the Germans had been forced back into Norway the offensive came to a halt and Karelian Front went into STAVKA reserve.

In December the division was reassigned to 19th Army, which in turn was assigned to Gen. K.K. Rokossovski's 2nd Belorussian Front. It crossed Poland and was positioned in Ostrow-Mazowiecki in January 1945. On 26 February, during the East Pomeranian Offensive, the division moved from Baldenberg and turned northeast to Rummelsburg and on 3 March captured Rummelsburg. On 21 March, 10th Guards was relocated to the right flank of the army – 30 km southwest of Marschau and then advanced towards Pustkovits-Gdynia.

After helping to take Gdynia on 31 March the division joined forces with 1st Polish Tank Brigade and attacked Zagorje, east of Janowo, located on the peninsula formed by the Gulf Puttsger Vic and the river Rod. By the end of April, the 10th Guards was positioned in the forests northeast of Treptow and covered the coast of Baltic Sea from Kohlberg to Valddivinov. The division mopped-up the forests, eliminating small scattered groups of German troops. In the last days of the war, the division crossed the delta of the river Oder at Swinemünde and was engaged in fighting on the island of Usedom before the German surrender.

== Postwar Service ==
In the postwar period it moved to Akhaltsikhe in the Georgian SSR, joining the Transcaucasus Military District. It was active there by 1 January 1947, being converted into a mountain rifle division in 1949. In 1962 it became the 10th Guards Motor Rifle Division, part of 31st Army Corps. The division was disbanded in March 1992, with its lineage, honours and awards transferred to the 67th Motor Rifle Division in the Far East, which was redesignated as the 115th Guards Motor Rifle Division.

== Subordination September 1944 – May 1945 ==
Date	Front (District)	Army	Corps
September 1944	Karelian Front	14th Army	
October 1944	Karelian Front	14th Army	131st Rifle Corps
November 1944	Karelian Front	14th Army	99th Rifle Corps
December 1944	Reserve Stavka	19th Army	99th Rifle Corps
January 1945	Reserve Stavka	19th Army	40th Guards Rifle Corps
February 1945	2nd Belorussian Front	19th Army	40th Guards Rifle Corps
March 1945	2nd Belorussian Front	19th Army	40th Guards Rifle Corps
April 1945	2nd Belorussian Front	19th Army	40th Guards Rifle Corps
May 1945	2nd Belorussian Front	19th Army	134th Rifle Corps

== Order of battle ==
- 24th Guards Rifle Regiment
- 28th Guards Rifle Regiment of the Red Banner
- 35th Guards Rifle Regiment
- 29th Guards Artillery Regiment
- 14th Guards Anti-tank Battalion
- 4th Guards Anti-aircraft Battery (up to 4 June 1943)
- 21st Guards Mortar Battalion (until 29 October 1942)
- 13th Guards Reconnaissance Company
- 1st Guards Sapper Battalion
- 8th Guards Signal Company
- 12th Guards Medical/Sanitation Battalion
- 7th Guards Chemical Protection Company
- 5th Guards Truck Company
- 6th Guards Field Bakery Company
- 3rd Guards Veterinary Company

== Commanders ==
- Finnish, Nicola Nicholas (1941), Major General
- Pashkovskii, Michael Kazimirovich (26 December 1941 – 2 March 1942), Colonel
- Krasilnikov, Daniel Yefimovich (3 March 1942 – 23 July 1942), Major General
- Khudalov, Chariton A. (24 July 1942 – 29 November 1943), Colonel, as of 27 November 1942 Major General
- Grebenkin, Fedor Alekseevich (30 November 1943 – 23 March 1944), Colonel
- Khudalov, Chariton A. (24 March 1944 – 9 May 1945), Major General

== Awards and name ==
Award (name)	Date	For that received
Order of the Red Banner	19 June 1943	?
Pechengskii	31 October 1944	For the exemplary performance of tasks of command in the battles against the German invaders, for winning the city Petsamo (Pechenga) and for displaying valor and courage
Order of the Red Banner	5 April 1945	?
Order of Alexander Nevsky	26 April 1945	For the fulfillment of the command in the battles against the Nazi invaders in the capture of cities Laudenburg, Kartuzy (Karthauz) and for displaying valor and courage
The Order of the Red Star	4 June 1945	?

== Heroes of the Soviet Union ==
Award	Name	Position	Title	Date award	Notes
	Aliyev, Said Davidovich	Sniper 35th Guards Rifle Regiment	Guards Sergeant	22 February 1943	
	Borodulin, Ivan	Commander Branch 28th Guards Rifle Regiment	Guards Sergeant	?	
	Generalov, Alexei Petrovich	Mortar company commander of 28th Guards Rifle Regiment	Guards Captain	2 November 1943	Posthumously
	Zhulega, Gregory Prokhorovich	Assistant platoon leader Reconnaissance Btn. 35 Guards Rifle Regiment	Guards Sergeant	18 June 1944; 24 November 1944; 29 June 1945	
	Zimakov, Ivan	Battalion commander 29th Guards Artillery Regiment	Guards Major	24 March 1945	Posthumously: called artillery fire on his own position
	Ivchenko, Michael Lavrent'evich	Sniper 28th Guards Rifle Regiment	Guards Lance Corporal	2 November 1944	Posthumously: blocked machine gun embrasure with his own body
	Kvasnikov, Michael Savelievich	Mortarman 28th Guards Rifle Regiment	Guards Lance Corporal	24 March 1945	Posthumously: blocked machine gun embrasure with his own body
	Streltsov, Pavel	28th Guards Rifle Regiment	Guards ordinary	2 November 1944	26 October 1944 Died of wounds
	Frolov, Andrei D.	Company commander	Guards Lieutenant	2 November 1944	

== Memory ==
- Murmansk School-Museum from the School No. 26.
- Museum of professional construction school No. 48 of Moscow – Museum "Heroic Path 10th Guards Rifle Division"
