= 101st Guards Rifle Division =

Infantry division of the Red Army

- Active: 1944–1946
- Country: Soviet Union
- Branch: Red Army
- Type: Division
- Role: Infantry
- Engagements: East Pomeranian Offensive; Siege of Danzig (1945); Battle of Berlin
- Decorations: Order of the Red Banner; Order of Suvorov; Order of the Red Star
- Battle honours: Pechenga

Commanders
- Notable commanders: Col. Fyodor Alekseevich Grebyonkin; Maj. Gen. Evgenii Grigorevich Ushakov

The 101st Guards Rifle Division was reformed as an elite infantry division of the Red Army in December 1944, based on the 1st formation of the 14th Rifle Division, and served briefly in that role during the final campaigns in northern Germany during the Great Patriotic War.

As combat operations ended in northern Finland and Norway the Karelian Front became redundant and its forces were free to be redeployed to active fronts. The 101st Guards was reassigned to 19th Army where it joined the 40th Guards Rifle Corps and began moving by rail to the south and west. When it arrived in 2nd Belorussian Front in late January the Soviet offensive into Poland and eastern Germany was already well underway and the rebuilt divisions of 19th Army were committed into the fighting for East Pomerania and West Prussia. In the battles up to the end of March the division and several of its subunits won a number of decorations and distinctions for its successes, particularly in the siege of Gdynia. 40th Guards Corps was redeployed to the Oder River as the final offensive on Germany was beginning in mid-April and was reassigned to the 2nd Shock Army, but was largely retained as a Front reserve and saw little combat in those last weeks of the war. Following the German surrender the 101st Guards, along with the rest of 2nd Shock, served briefly in the Soviet occupation zone but within months returned to northern Russia where it was disbanded in mid-1946.

== Formation ==
Following the Petsamo–Kirkenes Offensive, which ended in late October 1944, the 14th was moved to the Reserve of the Supreme High Command along with the rest of the forces of the disbanded Karelian Front. As of the beginning of December it was part of the 99th Rifle Corps of 19th Army. On December 30 the division officially became the 101st Guards; it would receive its Guards banner in January 1945. Once the division completed its reorganization its order of battle was as follows:

- 321st Guards Rifle Regiment (from 95th Rifle Regiment)
- 326th Guards Rifle Regiment (from 155th Rifle Regiment)
- 329th Guards Rifle Regiment (from 325th Rifle Regiment)
- 417th Guards Artillery Regiment (from 143rd Artillery Regiment)
- 118th Guards Antitank Battalion (later 113th Guards Antitank Battalion)
- 111th Guards Reconnaissance Company
- 143rd Guards Sapper Battalion
- 196th Guards Signal Battalion
- 75th Medical/Sanitation Battalion
- 123rd Guards Chemical Defense (Anti-gas) Company
- 139th Motor Transport Company
- 603rd Field Bakery
- 203rd Divisional Veterinary Hospital
- 669th Field Postal Station
- 185th Field Office of the State Bank

The division remained under the command of Col. Fyodor Alekseevich Grebyonkin who had led the 14th since October 19. It retained the battle honor "Pechenga" (Petsamo) that it had won on October 15 for the liberation of that town. In addition, the 321st and 326th Guards Rifle Regiments also kept their honorifics for the capture of the Norwegian town of Kirkenes on October 25, while the 329th Guards Rifle Regiment had been awarded the Order of Aleksandr Nevsky on November 14 for its part in the same battle. In an unusual decision the division was also awarded the Order of the Red Banner on January 6 for its part in the battles for Pechenga.

== Combat History ==
At the beginning of January the division was still in 19th Army in the Reserve of the Supreme High Command but had been assigned to the 40th Guards Rifle Corps, along with the 10th and the 102nd Guards Rifle Divisions. This Corps and its Army left the Reserve and joined the active army on January 29, coming under command of the 2nd Belorussian Front. The Vistula-Oder Offensive had begun on January 12 and was drawing to a close by this time after a massive Soviet advance. The commander of the Front, Marshal K. K. Rokossovskii, would launch the East Pomeranian Offensive on February 10 in response to STAVKA directives No. 11021 and No. 11022 of February 8 and 9. The offensive was required due to the gap of about 150km in width that had developed between his Front in East Prussia and the 1st Belorussian Front which had reached the Oder River days earlier. After concentrating, the armies of 2nd Belorussian would attack toward Köslin and reach the Baltic coast, then turn to the northeast and east and capture the cities of Danzig and Gdynia.

=== East Pomeranian Offensive ===
As early as February 10 the 19th Army was concentrating in the Dobrzyń–Lipno–Rypin area; in addition to the 40th Guards the Army contained the 132nd and 134th Rifle Corps. The Front was generally facing the German 2nd Army of Army Group Vistula. The 65th, 49th and 70th Armies went over to the attack that day, primarily from a bridgehead over the Vistula that was being held by 65th Army near Graudenz. Meanwhile Rokossovskii ordered the 19th Army and 3rd Guards Tank Corps, which constituted his reserve, to begin moving to the left of his attacking forces, with the 19th concentrating in the Chojnice–Lubiewo–Tuchel area by February 21. The first stage of the Front's offensive gained up to 70km in 10 days but was effectively halted by February 19.

New instructions from the STAVKA on February 17 called for 2nd Army to be cut off from the main German forces prior to its final destruction. To this end the 19th Army and 3rd Guards Tanks were to attack on February 24 to reach the Baltic in the Kolberg sector. The Army was reinforced with the 3rd Artillery Breakthrough Corps and relieved elements of 70th Army along a line from Deringsdorf to Preußisch Friedland, although later than the plan called for. It faced the reinforced 32nd Infantry Division and the 15th SS Grenadier Division (1st Latvian). The 40th Guards and 134th Rifle Corps were in first echelon with the 132nd Corps in second; 40th Guards in turn had two divisions in first echelon and one in second. The width of the breakthrough sector was 10km and the average artillery density (76mm calibre or larger) reached 152 guns and mortars per kilometre. Being fresh the Army's rifle divisions averaged a personnel strength of 8,000, roughly double that of the Front's other divisions which had been in near-continuous combat for over a month.

Following a 40-minute artillery preparation 19th Army launched its assault in the direction of Köslin and broke through the defense along the entire sector, overcoming stubborn resistance and counterattacks by German armor. The leading corps advanced 10-12km through the day and widened the gap to 20km. On February 25 the Army continued to develop the offensive, assisted by the left flank units of 70th Army and the 3rd Guards Cavalry Corps, gaining another 10-12km and widening the breakthrough gap to 30km, into which the 3rd Guards Tank Corps was introduced. Meanwhile the center and right-wing armies of the Front were having no success against established German defenses. The following day, assisted by the tanks and cavalry, 19th Army captured Schlochau, Stegers and Hammerstein after a further advance of up to 22km, with the armor operating as much as 30km forward of the rifle divisions. The XVIII Mountain Corps and VII Panzer Corps were forced to fall back to the north, putting up minimal resistance. At this point the 19th Army's commander, Lt. Gen. G. K. Kozlov, began to lose control of his battle as communications became disrupted, marching units fell behind and the artillery lagged due to poor road conditions.

Kozlov spent February 27 largely in putting his forces in order while attacking toward Prechlau in conjunction with 70th Army while also beating off up to 24 counterattacks from German tanks and infantry. Rokossovskii ordered Kozlov to resume his advance the next day to reach a line from Rummelsburg to Groß Karzenburg to Worchow by the end of the day. He specifically directed as follows:

a) the 19th Army's 40th Guards Rifle Corps, which was attacking toward Gross Karzenburg, was to reach the front ––excluding Gross Karzenburg; in the Rummelsburg area, following its capture, the corps was to have not less than one rifle division with forward detachments along the line Georgendorf–Woknin; the corps was to be reinforced with artillery...

The German forces, which included the XXXXVI Panzer Corps, were putting up their fiercest resistance in the Rummelsburg area, mounting numerous counterattacks. The fighting for the town continued until March 3 when it finally fell and 19th Army advanced an additional 20km during the day, reaching the area north of Pollnow. On April 5 the 101st Guards would be awarded the Order of the Red Star for its role in the battle for Rummelsburg; this was an unusual decoration for a rifle division as it was normally given to smaller units.

=== Danzig Offensive ===
19th Army reached the Baltic coast on March 5 north and northeast of Köslin on a 20km-wide sector and German 2nd Army was effectively isolated. It was now directed to advance, still with 3rd Guards Tanks, in the direction of Stolp and Putzing. The 134th Rifle Corps was leading the Army and on March 7 linked up with 1st Belorussian Front on the outskirts of Kolberg. The main forces of 2nd Army were already falling back to the Danzig–Gdynia fortified area. On March 8 the 1st Guards Tank Army was assigned to the Front and was ordered to support 19th Army. During March 11-12 the two Armies advanced 35km, capturing Neustadt and Reda before closing up to the fortified lines the next day.

Rokossovskii's plan to seize the fortified area was to first attack in the direction of Zoppot to reach the shore and split the defenses of the two cities. 19th and 1st Guards Tank Armies would attack Gdynia from the north; the 19th would employ the 40th Guards and 134th Corps with armor support while a detachment from the 132nd Corps, also with tanks, was responsible for taking the Hel Peninsula. The assault would also be supported by the 1st and 18th Artillery Breakthrough Divisions and the 4th Guards Mortar Division. The garrison consisted of the remnants of VII Panzer Corps including the 7th Panzer and 32nd Infantry Divisions and the 4th SS Panzer Group. The attack began on March 14 but despite the preponderance of force made little progress up to March 22, on some days no progress at all. Zoppot fell on the 23rd in part to 19th Army's forces while the remainder fought for the second defense line in Gdynia. This line was finally broken by the end of March 26. Despite 1st Guards Tanks being pulled out of the battle overnight on March 26/27 after two further days of street fighting the 40th Guards and 134th Corps cleared Gdynia and its suburbs by the end of March 28. One regiment of the 101st Guards was recognized with an honorific:

GDYNIA... 329th Guards Rifle Regiment (Col. Dmitriev, Sergei Petrovich)... The troops who participated in the liberation of Gdynia, by the order of the Supreme High Command of 28 March 1945, and a commendation in Moscow, are given a salute of 20 artillery salvoes from 224 guns.

On May 17 the 326th Guards Rifle Regiment and the 417th Guards Artillery Regiment would each receive the Order of Kutuzov, 3rd Degree, for their parts in the same battle. In addition, on April 26 the division as a whole would be decorated with the Order of Suvorov, 2nd Degree, for taking Tczew and several nearby towns during the offensive.

=== Berlin Operation ===
After the East Pomeranian operation concluded on March 31 the 2nd Belorussian Front was redeployed to the lower Oder River for the final offensive into central Germany. On April 10 Colonel Grebyonkin was assigned to study at the K. Е. Voroshilov Higher Military Academy; he would go on to command the 354th Rifle Division postwar. He was replaced on April 20 by Maj. Gen. Evgenii Grigorevich Ushakov, who had recently graduated from the same Academy after commanding the 37th Guards Rifle Division.

The Front began its crossing operations on April 20. On April 23 the 40th Guards Corps was transferred to 2nd Shock Army. Two days later it began crossing into the bridgehead that had been created by 65th Army. Plans were made to clear Usedom and Rügen Islands but these proved to be unnecessary and the Corps remained in reserve, seeing little combat and ending the war on the Baltic coast.

== Postwar ==
When the fighting ended the division held the full title of 101st Guards Rifle, Pechenga, Order of the Red Banner, Orders of Suvorov and the Red Star Division. (Russian: 101-я гвардейская стрелковая Печенгская Краснознамённая орденов Суворова и Красной Звезды дивизия.) According to STAVKA Directive No. 11097, part 6, dated May 29 the division, along with 40th Guards Corps and the remainder of 2nd Shock Army, was transferred to 1st Belorussian Front which became the Group of Soviet Forces in Germany effective June 10. General Ushakov remained in command until October when he was injured in an automobile accident and hospitalized. He was replaced by Hero of the Soviet Union Maj. Gen. Mikhail Maksimovich Muzykin who held the position until the division was disbanded. 2nd Shock Army left the Soviet occupation zone in January 1946 and was moved to the Arkhangelsk area where its headquarters was used to form the new Arkhangelsk Military District. The 101st Guards was disbanded in July.
