= 186th Rifle Division (1941 formation) =

1st Polar (Polyarnaya) Division (September 5, 1941 - September 28, 1941) 186th Rifle Division (September 28, 1941 - June 26, 1943)
- Active: 1941–1943
- Country: Soviet Union
- Branch: Red Army
- Type: Infantry
- Size: Division
- Engagements: Operation Barbarossa; Operation Platinum Fox; Continuation War

Commanders
- Notable commanders: Col. Stefan Vladimirovich Kolomiets; Col. Fyodor Ivanovich Litvinov

The 1941 formation of the 186th Rifle Division was based on the 1st Polar (Polyarnaya) Militia Division that had been formed in the Murmansk area early in September 1941. 1st Polar distinguished itself as part of 14th Army during the last stage of the offensive by Mountain Corps Norway toward Murmansk. As this came to an end the division was reformed as a regular Red Army rifle division and was designated as the 186th despite the existence of another division of the same number at that time. It continued to serve in Karelian Front through 1942 and into mid-1943, seeing little combat on this mostly static front apart from a partly successful offensive near Kestenga as part of 26th Army in April/May 1942. It remained in this Army until it was redesignated as the 2nd formation of the 205th Rifle Division in late June 1943.

== 1st Polar Division ==
At 0300 hours on June 29 the 2nd and 3rd Mountain Divisions of Mountain Corps Norway, under command of Gen. E. Dietl, with a Finnish detachment of 600-800 men, launched Operation Platinum Fox, an effort to cross roughly 100km of near-trackless tundra from the Finnish border and capture Murmansk. On July 6 they reached the Litsa River on the far western approaches to Murmansk and forced a crossing but were later forced to withdraw. Another crossing was made but due to logistics and Soviet reinforcements Dietl's Corps was forced to go over to the defense on July 17.

During this pause in operations a militia division began forming to support the 14th and 52nd Rifle Divisions of 14th Army that had been opposing the German advance. The division recruited coal miners evacuated from Spitzbergen in August, in addition to sailors, labor-camp inmates and convicts. It officially entered the front lines on September 5 with two rifle regiments and very few supporting arms, under the command of Col. Stefan Vladimirovich Kolomiets, a veteran of the Russian Civil War. After being reinforced the German Corps renewed its offensive on September 8 but the reinforcements, being inexperienced, were no match for the Soviet fighters and on September 18 Dietl ordered his Corps back to the defense in preparation for winter, 50km from Murmansk.

== Reformation ==
1st Polar was reformed as a regular rifle division based on the shtat (table of organization and equipment) of July 29, 1941 in the front lines near Murmansk on September 28. No explanation has been publicly shared as to why the division was given the number '186' since the 1939 formation of the 186th still existed and was fighting near Moscow. Not only did the two divisions share the same number, most of their subunits did as well:

- 238th Rifle Regiment (from 1st Polar Rifle Regiment)
- 290th Rifle Regiment (from 2nd Polar Rifle Regiment)
- 298th Rifle Regiment
- 327th Artillery Regiment (from October 16)
- 227th Antitank Battalion
- 264th Antiaircraft Battalion
- 792nd Mortar Battalion
- 107th Reconnaissance Company
- 255th Sapper Battalion
- 244th Signal Battalion
- 167th Medical/Sanitation Battalion
- 133rd Chemical Defense (Anti-gas) Company
- 38th Motor Transport Company
- 42nd Field Bakery
- 1483rd Field Postal Station
- 915th Field Office of the State Bank

Colonel Kolomiets remained in command after the redesignation. During November the division was moved south to the Kestenga area where it joined the Kemskaya Operational Group. In December it shifted farther south, still in Karelian Front, and became part of the Maselskaya Operational Group. The 32nd Army was reformed in March, in part from the Maselskaya Group, and the division was assigned to that Army. The 186th was again redeployed in April, now to the 26th Army.

=== Kestenga Operation and Redesignation ===
On April 24 the 26th Army launched an offensive in the Kestenga area with the objective of improving its positions and driving the Finnish-German forces farther away from the Murmansk railway. The Soviet plan called for the Axis troops to be fixed by a frontal assault by the 263rd Rifle Division while the main attack would be made after a long outflanking move from the north by the 23rd Guards and 186th Divisions plus the 80th Marine Rifle and 8th Ski Brigades. This force faced the German 6th SS Mountain Division Nord and a composite Finnish division. The attack began during a heavy snowfall and while 26th Army had the advantage in manpower, artillery and mortars it had to contend with acute shortages of ammunition. In the early going elements of the 23rd Guards managed to wedge into the defenses up to 7km but the arrival of reserves brought the advance to a halt. The offensive was resumed on May 3, still making slow progress while also putting the defenders of Kestenga in semi-encirclement. A further regrouping followed by an attack on May 10 produced no results at all, and the Army went over to the defense the next day.

Over the next two months the 186th came under direct command of the Front, but in July it returned to 26th Army. It would remain under this command until its redesignation; being assigned to the new 31st Rifle Corps in May 1943. Colonel Kolomiets had handed his command over to Col. Fyodor Ivanovich Litvinov on June 2, 1942; he would go on to lead the 374th and 34th Rifle Divisions and would be promoted to the rank of major general in September 1944. On June 26, 1943, in order to eliminate confusion with the 1939 formation, the division was redesignated as the 2nd formation of the 205th Rifle Division.
