= Operation Platinum Fox =

Soviet victory

- Part of Operation Silver Fox
Date	29 June – 21 September 1941 (2 months, 3 weeks and 2 days)
Location	Petsamo, Litsa River, Rybachy Peninsula
Result	Soviet victory

Belligerents
Germany; Finland	Soviet Union

Commanders and leaders
(Nazi Germany) Eduard Dietl	(Soviet Union) Valerian A. Frolov

Strength
2nd Mountain Division; 3rd Mountain Division; 2 additional SS regiments Finnish 14th Infantry Regiment; Finnish Ivalo Border Guard Battalion; 27,500 men (initially)	14th Rifle Division; 52nd Rifle Division; 1st Polar Division; Soviet Northern Fleet

Casualties and losses
10,300 overall	Unknown

Operation Platinum Fox (German: Unternehmen Platinfuchs; Finnish: operaatio Platinakettu) was a German and Finnish military offensive launched during World War II. Platinum Fox took place on the Eastern Front and had the objective of capturing the Barents Sea port of Murmansk. It was part of a larger operation, called Operation Silver Fox (Silberfuchs; Hopeakettu).

== Background ==
At the beginning of Operation Barbarossa German units of Army of Norway, commanded by Nikolaus von Falkenhorst, attacked from Norway to secure Petsamo at the Finnish-Soviet border as part of Operation Reindeer. They joined Finnish forces on the border of Soviet territory. These divisions consisted of elite mountain troops mostly from Austria specially trained to operate above the Arctic Circle. The Finnish-German forces launched Operation Silver Fox (Silberfuchs), attacking Murmansk from two directions. The assault from Finnish Petsamo directly towards the port of Murmansk was codenamed Platinum Fox (Platinfuchs). The other assault was an attack Kandalaksha from Salla and to isolate Murmansk from the south by cutting off the Murmansk railway. This concurrent operation was codenamed Operation Arctic Fox (Polarfuchs).

== Platinum Fox ==
On 29 June 1941 the Platinum Fox phase of Silver Fox was launched. Mountain Corps Norway under the command of Generalleutnant Eduard Dietl, consisting of the German 2nd Mountain Division and German 3rd Mountain Division together with the Finnish Ivalo Border Guard Battalion crossed the border and advanced on Murmansk. They were opposed by units of the Soviet 14th Army, namely the 14th and 52nd Rifle Division, which were commanded by Valerian A. Frolov. After some initial successes the advance was slowed. The German offensive met with many problems from the start, as the rough terrain with bad roads made any advance difficult. The German units also lacked proper maps and had to move mostly through unknown terrain.

The two divisions advanced in two directions. In the south the 3rd Mountain Division was able to penetrate the Soviet lines at the Titovka Valley in one day after fierce fighting and secured a bridge over the river. In the north the 2nd Mountain Division also made good progress in the first hours to secure the neck of the Rybachy Peninsula.

Nevertheless, the offensive soon met with heavy Soviet resistance, especially from some ad-hoc ground units of the Soviet Northern Fleet. The 2nd Mountain Division could not advance into the Rybachy Peninsula, and already at the start of July had to go into the defensive in this sector. Further south, after a heavy Soviet counterattack, the Germans resumed their offensive to the east to reach the Litsa River, with joint forces from both divisions. With the element of surprise lost, the Germans were only able to establish a small bridgehead over the river. After a heavy Soviet counterattack on 7 July, Dietl requested more reinforcements, but he received only a motorized machine-gun battalion from Norway.

On 10 July a new plan had to be made, after a copy of the offensive plan fell into Soviet hands. The 2nd Mountain Division had to expand the bridgehead, while the 3rd Mountain Division had to advance on the south and establish another bridgehead. The renewed attack was again initially successful, but after the Soviets landed with two battalions on the other side of the Litsa Bay further north, Dietl had to stop the offensive. The situation now became worse for the Germans, as the thinly stretched forces had to hold a 57 km long frontline along the Litsa River to the Rybachy Peninsula. With the absence of roads, the supply situation also deteriorated and the offensive stalled. Dietl asked for more reinforcements and Hitler, after initially being reluctant, agreed to transfer the 6th Mountain Division from Greece to Dietl's command. After more arguing, in August the 388th Infantry Regiment and the 9th SS Regiment from Norway were also assigned to the operation.

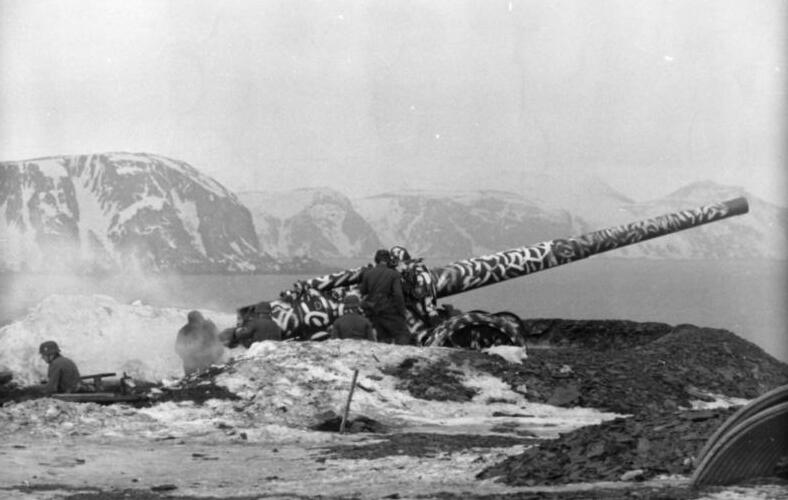
German coastal artillery – German shipping was under constant attack by Soviet-British forces

Dietl now made plans to renew the offensive, with the fresh SS regiment leading the assault, in September before the onset of the winter would make it difficult to fight. But a combination of British and Soviet surface ships and aircraft, which constantly attacked German shipping to the northern ports, hampered the arrival of reinforcements and supplies and would delay the arrival of the 6th Mountain Division to October. Nevertheless, on 8 September Dietl started with the renewed offensive without the 6th Mountain Division. The initial assault failed badly and the SS regiment, untrained for arctic warfare, took heavy casualties. The Germans made some initial progress, but a Soviet counterattack stopped the offensive soon after.

Constant attacks by Soviet submarines and British surface ships (consisting of a force of two aircraft carriers, two cruisers and six destroyers) also sank numerous German ships and worsened the supply situation even more. For this reason von Falkenhorst prohibited German shipping from sailing east of the North Cape on 13 September. Hitler again pressured to continue the offensive, but Dietl made it clear, that with the dire supply situation and without further reinforcements no further advance was possible. On 19 September the Germans retreated from their bridgehead east of the Litsa river. More Soviet reinforcements arrived in the area and on 21 September the German offensive was broken off. Mountain Corps Norway was ordered to now defend the frontline and secure the Petsamo area and its nickel-mines, as a renewed offensive was ruled out. In mid-October the 2nd Mountain Division withdrew to Petsamo and the 6th Mountain Division replaced the 3rd Mountain Division along the Litsa line. The 3rd Mountain Division was then moved back to Germany in December.

During the winter of 1941, the Soviets launched several heavy attacks on the Litsa as well as the Rybachy Peninsula front. The dug-in German units were able to hold it, cementing the front line for the next years.

== Conclusion ==
Operation Platinum Fox was a German failure. Although Dietl was able to make some ground, his insufficient forces were soon stopped by the Soviets. The presence of British-Soviet naval forces at the Barents Sea hampered German efforts to adequately supply his forces and the general unwillingness of the German High Command to reinforce something which they considered as a secondary theater paved the way for the only successful Soviet resistance in the early stages of Operation Barbarossa. The failure of Platinum Fox had a significant impact on the course of the war in the east. Murmansk was a major base for the Soviet Northern fleet and it also was the destination of shipped Western Allied aid to the Soviet Union. With the entry of the United States into the war in December 1941, the stream of supplies intensified even more through the Lend-Lease pact. A large part of this was delivered via the Northern route to the port of Murmansk, and the port of Arkhangelsk, contributing to its continued resistance.

In recognition of its role in the successful defense of Murmansk, the Soviet 52nd Rifle Division was renamed 10th Guards Rifle Division on 26 December 1941.

== Orders of battle ==
=== German ===
- German 2nd Mountain Division
- German 3rd Mountain Division

Under the direct command of AOK Lappland:

- Finnish Separate Detachment (Petsamo) (Erillinen Osasto (Petsamo))
- 14th Finnish Infantry Regiment (Jalkaväkirykmentti 14 (JR 14))
- Finnish Ivalo Border Guard Battalion

=== Soviet ===
- 14th Rifle Division
- 52nd Rifle Division
- 1st Polar Division
- Several non assigned ad-hoc units

== Notes ==
- ^{a} a mixed unit consisting of ad-hoc drafted and volunteered sailors and marine units later renamed 186th Rifle Division

== Bibliography ==
- Sharp, Charles C. (1995). Red Guards: Soviet Guards Rifle and Airborne Units 1941 to 1945. Vol. IV. Nafziger Collection, Incorporated. ISBN 1585450340.
- Mann, Chris M.; Jörgensen, Christer (2002). Hitler's Arctic War. Hersham, UK: Ian Allan Publishing Ltd. ISBN 0-7110-2899-0.
- Nenye, Vesa; Munter, Peter; Wirtanen, Tony; Birks, Chris (2016). Finland at War: The Continuation and Lapland Wars 1941–45. Osprey Publishing. ISBN 978-1-4728-1526-2.
- Ueberschär, Gerd R. (1998). "Strategy and Policy in Northern Europe". In Boog, Horst; Förster, Jürgen; Hoffmann, Joachim; Klink, Ernst; Müller, Rolf-Dieter; Ueberschär, Gerd R. (eds.). The Attack on the Soviet Union. Vol. IV. Translated by McMurry, Dean S.; Osers, Ewald; Willmot, Louise. Militärgeschichtliches Forschungsamt (Military History Research Office (Germany) ). Oxford: Clarendon Press. pp. 941–1020. ISBN 0-19-822886-4.
- Ziemke, Earl F. (1959). The German Northern Theater of Operations 1940–1945. United States Government Printing. ISBN 0-16-001996-6.
