= 23rd Guards Rifle Division =

- Active: 1942–1947
- Country: Soviet Union
- Branch: Red Army / Soviet Army
- Type: Division
- Role: Infantry
- Engagements: World War II; Kestenga Operation; Battle of Demyansk; Leningrad-Novgorod Offensive; Staraya Russa-Novorzhev Offensive; Pskov-Ostrov Offensive; Baltic Offensive; Riga Offensive; Vistula-Oder Offensive; East Pomeranian Offensive; Battle of Berlin
- Decorations: Order of the Red Banner
- Battle honours: Dno; Berlin

Commanders
- Notable commanders: Maj. Gen. Vladimir Aleksandrovich Solovyov; Maj. Gen. Sergei Nikolaievich Aleksandrov; Col. Andrei Markovich Kartavenko; Maj. Gen. Pankratii Vikulovich Beloborodov; Maj. Gen. Pavel Mendelevich Shafarenko

The 23rd Guards Rifle Division was reformed as an elite infantry division of the Red Army in March, 1942, based on the 1st formation of the 88th Rifle Division, and served in that role until after the end of the Great Patriotic War. It was one of just two Guards divisions to be formed in the far north, the 10th Guards being the other. It continued to serve in Karelian Front, where it was formed, until October when it was railed south to join the 1st Shock Army of Northwestern Front; it would remain in that Army until nearly the end of 1944. Over the next several months it took part in the dismal fighting around the Demyansk salient until it was evacuated by the German II Army Corps in March, 1943. During the rest of the year the division continued battling through the forests and swamps south of Lake Ilmen, occasionally under command of the 14th Guards Rifle Corps, until the Leningrad-Novgorod Offensive began in late January, 1944. The 23rd Guards took part in the liberation of Staraya Russa in mid-February and went on to win a battle honor about a week later at Dno. 1st Shock Army (now in 2nd Baltic Front) closed up to the German Panther Line south of Lake Peipus during the spring and then helped break through it at the start of the Baltic Campaign in July. For its part in the liberation of Ostrov the division was awarded the Order of the Red Banner before gradually advancing through Latvia towards Riga, which it helped to liberate in October. By now it was in the 12th Guards Rifle Corps which was transferred in late November to the 3rd Shock Army in 1st Belorussian Front. The 23rd Guards would remain under these commands for the duration of the war, advancing across Poland and eastern Germany into Berlin in 1945 and winning a second honorific after the fighting ended. Despite a fine record of service it was disbanded in 1947.

== Formation ==
The division was officially raised to Guards status on March 17, 1942, in recognition of its leading role in stopping the drive of the Finnish III Army Corps along the Kestenga-Loukhi road which had threatened to cut the Kirov Railway south from Murmansk. As the 88th the division had a special organization for operations in the roadless arctic terrain but this became more standardized during conversion and after the subunits received their redesignations on April 17 was as follows:

- 63rd Guards Rifle Regiment (from 426th Rifle Regiment)
- 66th Guards Rifle Regiment (from 611th Rifle Regiment)
- 68th Guards Rifle Regiment (from 758th Rifle Regiment)
- 49th Guards Artillery Regiment (from 401st Artillery Regiment)
- 28th Guards Antitank Battalion (from 269th Antitank Battalion)
- 26th Guards Antiaircraft Battery (until March 15, 1943)
- 7th Guards Mortar Battalion (until October 10, 1942)
- 27th Guards Reconnaissance Company (from 147th Reconnaissance Company)
- 18th Guards Sapper Battalion (from 222nd Sapper Battalion)
- 31st Guards Signal Battalion (from 221st Signal Battalion)
- 25th Guards Medical/Sanitation Battalion (from 288th Medical/Sanitation Battalion)
- 20th Guards Chemical Defense (Anti-gas) Company (from 128th Chemical Defense (Anti-gas) Company)
- 16th Guards Motor Transport Company
- 19th Guards Field Bakery (from 154th Field Bakery)
- 21st Guards Divisional Veterinary Hospital
- 191st Field Postal Station
- 373rd Field Office of the State Bank

Col. Vladimir Aleksandrovich Solovyov remained in command of the division after redesignation; he would be promoted to the rank of major general on May 3. By this time the division was under command of the 26th Army

=== Kestenga Operation ===
On April 24 the 26th Army launched an offensive in the Kestenga area with the objective of improving its positions and driving the Finnish-German forces farther away from the railway. The Soviet plan called for the Axis troops to be fixed by a frontal assault by the 263rd Rifle Division while the main attack would be made after a long outflanking move from the north by the 23rd Guards and 186th Rifle Divisions plus the 80th Marine Rifle and 8th Ski Brigades. This force faced the German 6th SS Mountain Division Nord and a composite Finnish division. The attack began during a heavy snowfall and while 26th Army had the advantage in manpower, artillery and mortars it had to contend with acute shortages of ammunition. In the early going elements of the 23rd Guards managed to wedge into the defenses up to 7 km but the arrival of reserves brought the advance to a halt. The offensive was resumed on May 3, still making slow progress while also putting the defenders of Kestenga in semi-encirclement. A further regrouping followed by an attack on May 10 produced no results at all, and the Army went over to the defense the next day.

In August General Solovyov would be made the 26th Army's deputy commander. He was replaced in command of the division by Col. Sergei Nikolaievich Aleksandrov, who would himself be promoted to major general on September 12 prior to the move south to join Northwestern Front.

== Demyansk Campaign ==
Between September 27 and October 9 the 1st Shock Army suffered a defeat when German 16th Army launched Operation Michael against its forces south of the Ramushevo corridor which linked the II Army Corps around Demyansk to the main German front. In part due to this setback and in part due to plans being formulated for the overall winter counteroffensive the 23rd Guards was loaded onto trains on the Kirov Railway later in October and moved south to the Ostashkov railhead to join 1st Shock. The intention of the new offensive, as in those during the summer and fall, would be to penetrate the corridor from the south and link up with 11th Army to its north, again encircling the German Demyansk grouping. As with the case of Operation Mars at Rzhev, constant bad weather and a late front delayed Northwestern Front's preparations for its offensive, particularly the regrouping of its forces.

On November 2 the division, with a current strength of 9,651 personnel, officially came under the command of 1st Shock Army, along with the 167th Tank Regiment with 24 T-34 tanks. The Army commander, Lt. Gen. V. I. Morozov, planned to have the 23rd Guards and 129th Rifle Divisions and 86th Rifle Brigade, supported by the 167th Tanks, 70th Guards Mortar Regiment, and the bulk of the Army's artillery, conduct the main attack in the Rechki and Sarai sector, while the remainder of his forces conducted an "active" defense along the remainder of his front. The shock group would face roughly three German regiments supported by 15-20 tanks. While this gave the Red Army forces a ratio of over three to one in infantry and an edge in armor strength it would be mostly negated by the thick and roadless terrain and unfavorable weather.

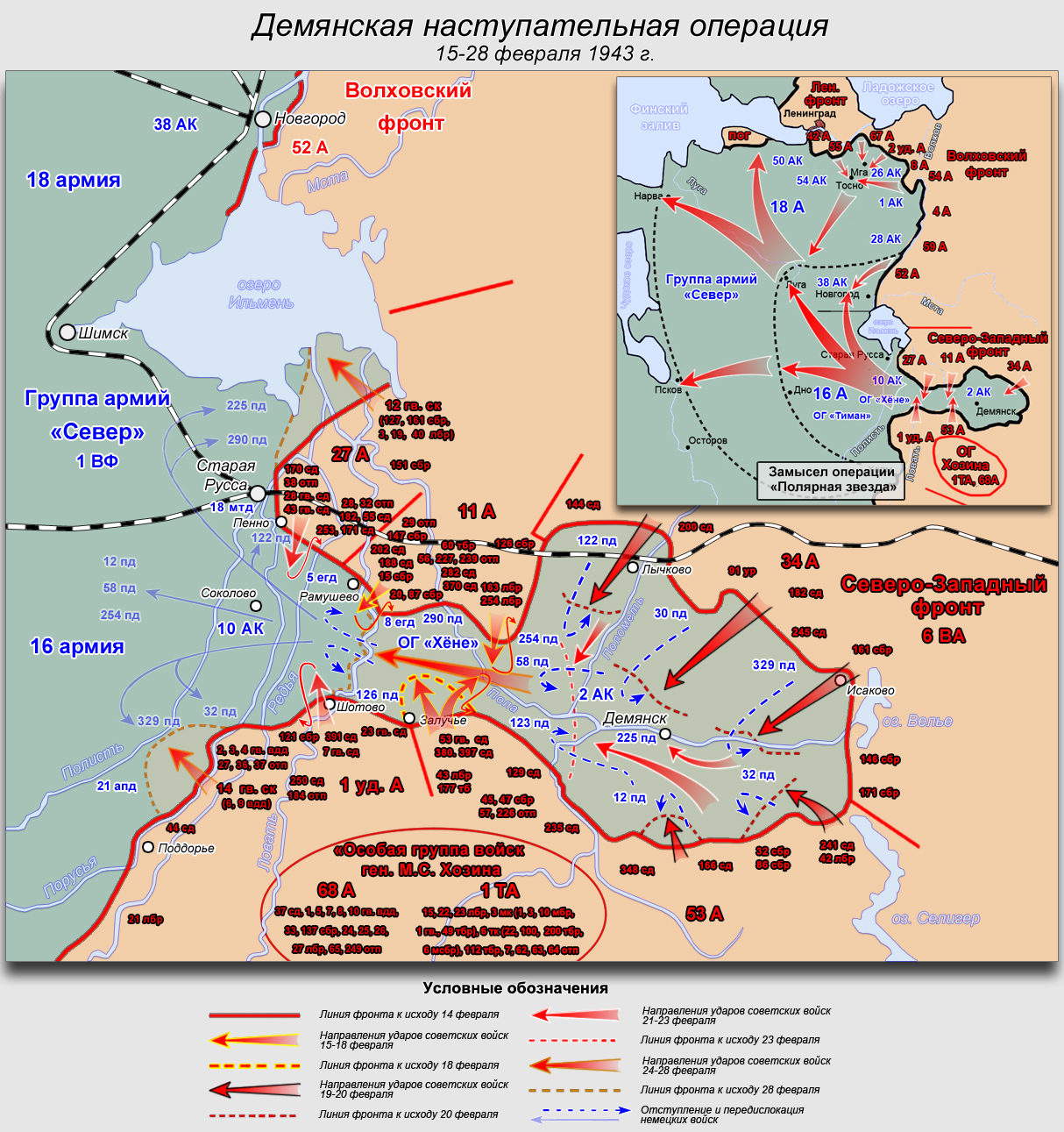
Soviet positions at Demyansk, spring 1943. The 23rd Guards was in the 1st Shock Army sector south of the Ramushevo corridor

1st Shock's attack began with a preliminary operation by the 86th Brigade on the night of November 23/24, striking at the boundary between the 126th and 123rd Infantry Divisions but this stalled short of its initial objective due to heavy mud and German fire. Despite this failure the 23rd Guards and 129th divisions were ordered to pass through the Brigade's lines and take up jumping-off positions overnight on November 27/28. Their assault began at 1115 hours the next day, supported by the 167th Tank Regiment and the 103rd and 401st Tank Battalions and following a 45-minute artillery preparation. This achieved some successes, although at the cost of heavy losses. Operating in carefully tailored shock groups with direct armor support the leading rifle regiments advanced 2–2.5 km deep into the German forward security outposts and extensive engineering obstacles before arriving at the forward edge of the main line at 2000 hours, after dark. At this point they ran into a virtual wall of German fire, reportedly "4–5 artillery and mortar battalions firing more than 4,500 rounds." After taking only small toeholds in these defenses the relentless artillery fire and numerous company-to-battalion sized counterattacks forced the two divisions back to their start lines. Despite this, General Morozov ordered several attempts to renew the offensive over the next few days, but to no avail. Although the STAVKA realized the offensive had failed, as with Operation Mars it insisted the armies continue their futile attacks, which were not suspended until December 11.

The offensive was renewed on December 23, even after Operation Mars had finally collapsed. By now the attackers had fallen into stereotyped methods; when 1st Shock was observed massing for yet another assault on December 27 the German forces interdicted with an artillery counter-preparation, firing over 14,000 shells which rendered the Army temporarily combat ineffective. By the time the STAVKA allowed the offensive to be suspended again in early January, 1943 most of the Front's best divisions, including the 23rd Guards, were battered wrecks. Clearly the defenses around the salient remained formidable but given that Demyansk had always been partially supplied by air, following the encirclement of the German 6th Army at Stalingrad those air assets were much more required to the south. Too late to make a difference, on January 31 Hitler authorized the evacuation of the salient.

In the aftermath of Operation Iskra, which had restored land communications with Leningrad, Marshal Georgy Zhukov planned a further operation, Polyarnaya Zvezda, intended to completely end the siege of that city and destroy Army Group North. Northwestern Front's role in the offensive would once again be the elimination of the Demyansk salient. At the same time the German command was planning its Operation Ziethen, the phased withdrawal from the salient. 1st Shock Army's part in the offensive was to begin on February 19. It was regrouped westward to attack the south side of the mouth of the corridor and was reinforced with four tank regiments, two artillery divisions, two Guards Mortar divisions, and two aviation corps. Ziethen began on February 17 and immediately began freeing up German troops to form reserves. 1st Shock's attack had to be postponed until February 26 by which time it was facing three German divisions instead of one. The assault troops managed to gain from 1 to 3 km with great difficulty, and a further effort the next day was stopped in its tracks. A further effort on February 27 involving the 23rd Guards was also unsuccessful. Days before this, on February 24, General Aleksandrov was replaced in command by Col. Andrei Markovich Kartavenko.

=== Operations in 1943 ===
The II Army Corps officially completed its evacuation of the Demyansk salient on March 1. The forces freed by this move strengthened the overall German position and Polyarnaya Zvezda was effectively stillborn, although Zhukov would continue to try to reinvigorate it for another month. Through the rest of the year 1st Shock Army would be lightly engaged with elements of German 16th Army along the Polist River. In October the 23rd Guards joined the 53rd Guards Rifle Division in the 14th Guards Rifle Corps under direct command of the Front; on November 19 this Front would be renamed 2nd Baltic.

== Into Western Russia ==
The Leningrad–Novgorod Offensive began on January 14, 1944, but did not immediately involve 2nd Baltic Front. However, by mid-February Leningrad Front's successful advance from Luga to Pskov left German 16th Army in a vulnerable salient. 2nd Baltic was ordered on February 17 to prepare an offensive in the direction of Idritsa, to begin on February 28–29. However, this plan was anticipated by Army Group North's Field Marshal W. Model and on the same day 16th Army was directed to begin withdrawing to the west, beginning with the forces that were still holding at Staraya Russa. This began before Soviet intelligence had detected its preparations and 1st Shock began its pursuit of X Army Corps on February 18 in the direction of Dno and Dedovichi. Over the next few days the German forces withdrew westward rapidly. Their principal intermediate defense line west of Staraya Russa ran along the north–south rail line from Dno to Nasvy. Appreciating the importance of Dno Model concentrated the 8th Jäger Division, a regiment of the 21st Luftwaffe Field Division and two security regiments in the city and the 30th Infantry Division to the south. Late on February 23 the 14th Guards Corps and the 111th Rifle Corps of 54th Army launched converging attacks on the defenses around Dno but were driven back by heavy counterattacks. A renewed assault the next day cleared the city and the 23rd Guards was recognized for its part in the victory with a battle honor:

"DNO... 23rd Guards Rifle Division (Colonel Kartavenko, Andrei Markovich)... The troops who participated in the liberation of Dno, by the order of the Supreme High Command of 24 February, 1944, and a commendation in Moscow, are given a salute of 12 artillery salvoes from 124 guns.

The Front exploited its successes on February 26. The 14th Guards Corps and the 208th Rifle Division of 54th Army forced the Shelon River northwest of Dedovichi, crushed German resistance on the river's west bank and advanced up to 12 km, capturing the Logovino–Novyi Krivets sector of the road from Porkhov to Chikhachevo; the defending 30th Infantry and 21st Luftwaffe divisions were forced to pull back quickly to the west and Porkhov was liberated the same day. As the pursuit continued 1st Shock advanced up to 22 km on February 27 and the key town of Pustoshka was taken. The STAVKA ordered 2nd Baltic to continue its advance without regrouping but the German VIII and XXXXIII Army Corps joined up and intensified their resistance opposite the 1st Shock and 22nd Armies and successfully withdrew their forces across the Velikaya River. Although 1st Shock advanced 40 km by the end of the day on February 29 and cut the Pskov-Opochka rail line, in the first days of March it was forced to go over to the defense. Later that month the division came under direct command of its Army, but returned to 14th Guards Corps in April. On June 7 Colonel Kartavenko handed his command to Maj. Gen. Pankraty Vikulovich Beloborodov. At this time the division had a strength of only about 3,100 personnel.

== Baltic Campaign ==
In July, prior to the Pskov-Ostrov Campaign, the 1st Shock Army was reassigned to the 3rd Baltic Front. The 23rd Guards remained in 14th Guards Corps, but it was the only division assigned. When the offensive began on July 8 the division was facing the defenses of the Panther line east of the Velikaya, roughly halfway between Pskov and Ostrov. The latter city was liberated on July 21 and for its part in this battle on August 9 the division would be decorated with the Order of the Red Banner. By the beginning of August it was advancing west of Ostrov towards the border with Latvia. On August 26 General Beloborodov handed his command over to Maj. Gen. Pavel Mendelevich Shafarenko, who would remain in this post for the duration of the war. By mid-September the 23rd Guards was, with the rest of 1st Shock, near the Latvian-Estonian border in the vicinity of Ape, Latvia, slowly advancing west. During the first days of October it had reached Limbaži and was closing on the Latvian capital of Riga from the northeast. The city was captured on October 13 and two regiments of the division were recognized with battle honors:

"RIGA... 63rd Guards Rifle Regiment (Colonel Emelyantsev, Gavriil Davidovich)... 49th Guards Artillery Regiment (Lt. Colonel Shevchenko, Fyodor Petrovich)... The troops who participated in the liberation of Riga, by the order of the Supreme High Command of 13 October, 1944, and a commendation in Moscow, are given a salute of 24 artillery salvoes from 324 guns."

In addition, on October 31 the 66th Guards Rifle Regiment would be decorated with the Order of the Red Banner while the 68th Regiment would receive the Order of Aleksandr Nevsky. Within days of the takeover of Riga 3rd Baltic Front was disbanded and 1st Shock returned to 2nd Baltic, but 23rd Guards was reassigned to the 12th Guards Rifle Corps under direct Front command. It would remain in this Corps for the duration. On November 29 the commander of the 1st Belorussian Front, Marshal Zhukov, received the following:

"By order of the Supreme Commander-in-Chief, the following are being transferred to you by railroad:... a) 3rd Shock Army, consisting of:... 12th Guards Rifle Corps (23rd and 52nd Guards Rifle and 33rd Rifle Divisions)... along with reinforcements, service establishments and rear organs. The army will arrive approximately between 11 December and 10 January at the Lublin station."

In the buildup to the Vistula-Oder Offensive the 3rd Shock was assigned to serve as the Front reserve and was concentrated in the area of Pilawa and Garwolin.

== Into Germany ==
In the plan for the Vistula-Oder Offensive 3rd Shock was in the Front second echelon with the initial objective of developing the offensive from the Magnuszew bridgehead towards Poznań. As it continued the Army's forces served to guard the Front's right (north) flank and tie in to the 2nd Belorussian Front advancing into East Prussia, leaving them guarding a very broad front by the first days of February. After reaching the Oder with its main forces the 1st Belorussian was directed to clear the remaining German forces from East Pomerania, where 3rd Shock was already operating. When this offensive began on February 24 the 12th Guards Corps, along with 2nd Guards Cavalry Corps, was ordered to continue to hold along a line from Battrow to Groß Born. 12th Guards was later pulled back into Army reserve.

=== Berlin Operation ===
Prior to the start of the offensive on Berlin the 3rd Shock Army was redeployed into the Soviet bridgehead over the Oder at Küstrin. The main attack front was a 6 km sector on its left flank from Amt Kienitz to Letschin. 12th Guards Corps was in the first echelon with 79th Rifle Corps. The 23rd Guards, which had been brought up to a strength of about 5,500 personnel, was in its Corps' first echelon with 52nd Guards and 33rd Rifle Divisions. The Army was supported by the 9th Tank Corps. In order to cover the deployment of 3rd Shock into the bridgehead, on April 14 the reconnaissance in its zone was carried out by units of 5th Shock Army which had been there for some time. On the following day the Army took over its own reconnaissance; 12th Guards Corps deployed one reinforced rifle battalion from each of its divisions, supported by one artillery brigade, one long-range howitzer brigade, a mortar brigade and an antitank artillery regiment. By the end of the day these advance battalions had advanced as much as 3 km and consolidated along a line of separate homesteads 1.5 km south of Amt Kienitz and the same distance east of Letschin. As a result of these and other similar advances by the Front's forces the German defensive system was largely uncovered and partly disorganized, and the thickest zone of minefields was overcome.

==== Main Defensive Zone ====
The main offensive began on April 16 with a massive artillery preparation 0500 hours. At 0520 the signal was given to attack and a bank of 20 searchlights was switched on. In the early going the 12th Guards Corps captured the powerful strongpoints at Sitzing and Letschin. While the 52nd Guards and 33rd Divisions fought for the latter place, the 2nd Battalion of the 66th Guards Regiment was engaged in a fight for the German Posedin and Wuschewire strongpoints. Posedin formed part of the main defensive zone which was as much as 7 km deep in this area. The position consisted of two continuous trenches and individual buildings had been turned into permanent firing points connected to deep cellars for cover. Barbed wire was present both in continuous strands and as Bruno coils, along with minefields, individual foxholes and machine gun posts. All this was defended by a battalion of the 1234th Regiment of the Kurmark Panzergrenadier Division, reinforced with 10-12 guns and a machine gun company. In support the regiment had two artillery battalions and 2-3 mortar batteries. The battalion had close to 200 infantrymen, about 30 of whom were armed with sub-machine guns and another 30 carrying Panzerfausts.

The 66th Guards Regiment commander ordered his 2nd Battalion to take the Posedon position that day and then get astride the road junction to its southwest. The Battalion commander, Maj. Semyon Ivanovich Nikin, decided to outflank Posedon with his 5th Company from the north and 4th Company from the south to get into its rear, while the 6th Company waited to exploit any developments. Each company had about 80 riflemen. The attack was supported by the 49th Guards Artillery Regiment's 1st Battalion, a battery of regimental artillery, a company of 120mm mortars, and a battery from the antitank artillery regiment. This artillery provided a preparation which suppressed most of the German weapons before the Battalion's attack. However, Nikin noticed that this fire seemed to have completely suppressed the enemy fire from the trenches north and south of Posedon and he modified his plans accordingly. As early as 1100 hours the 5th Company, with two 45mm antitank guns, had outflanked the position and captured the junction. An hour later the 4th Company accomplished the same to the south and Posedon was encircled, leading to disorder among the defenders as some attempted to hurriedly withdraw to Wuschewire. Meanwhile, 33rd Division was meeting stiff resistance at Letschin, so Nikin ordered his 5th Company to get in the rear of that position and disrupt its defense. He also directed his 6th Company to make a frontal attack on Wuschewire just past noon. At the same time the 5th Company got within 2 km of Letschin from the west and destroyed several German guns and machine gun crews that had been supporting the garrison there. By 1300 hours the 33rd Division took the strongpoint. The German forces attempted to restore the situation with a counterattack by about 200 men, an assault gun, and artillery fire from Wuschewire to relieve the troops encircled at Posedon as these also attempted to break out. In this situation the 6th Company went over to the defense temporarily and opened fire with machine guns, mortars, and a pair of 45mm antitank guns against the counterattack force and dispersed it. Posedon was cleared by the early afternoon, after which Nikin called in heavy artillery and Katyusha fire on Wuschewire. His 4th Company outflanked the position from the north while 5th Company advanced from the south and 6th Company continued its assault from the east. The artillery had paralysed the defense and by 1400 hours the position was taken. The Battalion continued to advance, capturing Neutrebbin by the evening. During the day the 2nd Battalion advanced 9 km and broke through the entire German main defensive zone, at a cost of four men killed and 13 wounded. Following further exceptional service in the fighting for Berlin, on May 31 Major Nikin was made a Hero of the Soviet Union.

==== Second Defensive Zone ====
Although some fighting continued through the night the 3rd Shock continued its offensive at 0800 hours on April 17. 12th Guards Corps now had the 23rd Guards and 33rd Divisions in first echelon with 52nd Guards in reserve and 9th Guards Tanks in support. By 1300 hours units of the 23rd had reached the Friedlanderstrom Canal which formed a main line of the German second defensive zone. The canal itself was 10 metres in width and 1.5 - 3 metres in depth. On its eastern bank, in the area of Buschof Creek, there was a protection detachment consisting of a platoon of infantry, three machine guns and eight assault guns. Ambush positions with soldiers armed with Panzerfausts were also employed. In the Slanhof Creek area the Germans had concentrated a powerful artillery group covering the approaches to the canal. They also had air support in the form of groups of 3-5 Fw 190 fighters. The terrain in the division's attack zone was highly favorable to the defenders as it was a low-lying plain devoid of cover, while to the west of the canal the ground gradually rises to a series of heights covered with woods.

In this situation General Shafarenko decided to attack the German force in the area of Buschof Creek off the march, in conjunction with units of the 33rd Division but without waiting for the lagging artillery. The main blow was to be delivered by 66th Guards Regiment with 63rd Guards Regiment to the right and the 125th Independents Company along their boundary; 68th Guards Regiment concentrated in the Grube area. The attack began at 1400 hours after a short barrage by the available artillery which proved largely ineffective. The defenders opened a strong fire from all their weapons, forcing most of the 66th and 125th to remain pinned to the ground. Shafarenko then decided to postpone the attack until 1500 hours, allowing time for a fuller reconnaissance and for his heavier guns to come up. It was decided to employ all the artillery firing over open sights. This second barrage proved far more effective, destroying four of the assault guns and a machine gun at Buschof Creek and suppressing the other two machine guns. The division's units again attacked and attempted to force the canal. The 1st Battalion of the 66th Guards burst into Buschof Creek and destroyed the defending Germans in a short skirmish, capturing the machine guns and the four remaining serviceable assault guns with their crews. The 125th Company forced a crossing by makeshift means and got a hold on the west bank but the 66th and 63rd Guards were unsuccessful in following them due to increasing fire from flanking machine guns. Then, on Shafarenko's orders, tanks and self-propelled guns were brought right up to the canal's east bank and began firing on the German positions at point-blank range. A further artillery barrage was carried out at 1530 hours. Under its cover both regiments crossed the canal on whatever would float and within 30 minutes were firmly established on the west bank. The remaining German troops fell back to the Slanhof Creek area; following a short break the Soviet units took that area by storm. By the end of the day the 23rd Guards reached the paved road from Metzdorf to Gottesgabe, well inside the Germans' second defensive zone. 33rd Division on its left also reached Gottesgabe.

==== Into Berlin ====
By April 22 the 3rd Shock Army, now in conjunction with the 1st Mechanized Corps, had advanced as far as the suburbs in the northeastern part of Berlin. It resumed its offensive at 1000 hours against remnants of the 309th Infantry Division, the 1st Luftwaffe Field Division, the 11th SS Panzergrenadier Division Nordland, and assorted police, Volkssturm and other units. The 12th Guards Corps advanced 1.5–2 km in heavy fighting and by the end of the day was fighting along a line from Pankow to Weissensee. As a result of the day's operations the Army completed the breakthrough of the Berlin inner defensive line along its entire front. On April 25 the 66th Guards Regiment was attacking along the Muellerstrasse with the objective of taking the railway station in the Wedding area. By this time, due to casualties the Regiment's 3rd Battalion had been disbanded to provide replacements for the other two. Each battalion was storming the building simultaneously along both sides of the street and each had detached two rifle companies of about 50 men each. Each company was reinforced with 2-3 heavy machine guns, four antitank rifles, two 45mm antitank guns, and an engineer section. Many soldiers carried captured Panzerfausts. In addition the battalions each had an artillery regiment providing indirect fire, a battalion of 76mm guns firing over open sights, and a battery of four SU-76s in support.

Intense German fire made movement along the street impossible, so the special companies advanced from building to building through courtyards and by mouse-holing through basements, attics and adjoining rooms, destroying the defenders in skirmishes which were often hand-to-hand. By 1400 hours the Regiment had advanced as far as the intersection of the Muellerstrasse and the Luxemburgstrasse. To the right the 68th Guards Regiment was fighting on the Triftstrasse. Soon the 66th's advance was halted by heavy fire from two fortified buildings, on Luxemburgstrasse and the other on Schulstrasse. In this situation the commander of the Regiment ordered Major Nikin to attack the first building at 1600 hours to clear it, consolidate and then prepare to attack the second building along with the 1st Battalion. By 1400 hours both of Nikin's storm companies had concentrated in buildings opposite their objective as the engineers prepared direct fire positions for the antitank guns. The self-propelled guns were concentrated on the corner of Muellerstrasse and the Wagnitzstrasse.

Nikin decided, first, to break up the barricade near the Luxemburgstrasse building and throw in a small group of picked submachine gunners under cover of indirect and direct artillery fire, with the goal of causing panic and disorganization in the German fire system. Following this one company was to break into the building and the other to completely clear it. At 1600 hours the supporting artillery regiment opened fire on the building. At the same time fire from Panzerfausts and a single 45mm gun was concentrated on the barricade. In exactly five minutes the command to cease fire was transmitted by radio and telephone. One minute later the picked group of seven men and two engineers, let by a platoon commander, rushed across the street to a designated entranceway. Taking advantage of smoke and dust raised by the artillery they reached the entrance without loss but found the grenade- and gun-fire had not inflicted serious damage on the barricade. This was remedied with a 20kg demolition charge placed by the engineers, after which the group broke into the entrance and then the building's courtyard. The platoon commander left two men at two stairwells to prevent anyone leaving the cellar where the defenders had hidden during the barrage, with the exception of observers and machine gunners in the building itself. The battery of SU-76s was now able to advance under cover of the artillery barrage and began to fire on the building's lower floor windows and doors to create breaches for the attacking infantry. Simultaneously the Battalion's 45mm guns and machine guns opened fire on the building's upper windows. A number of smoke grenades were thrown just before the attack. At 1615 hours the fire ceased and one company rushed the entranceway. The company commander reinforced the men covering the cellar exits; these used grenades and rifle and SMG fire to throw back the German soldiers attempting to break out. In the course of this fighting 40 Germans were killed and five taken prisoner while the company lost eight men killed and wounded. The second company was now due to cross the street but was held up by heavy machine gun fire from a ruined building on the Triftstrasse. Nikin's observers quickly determined where the fire was coming from and within six or seven minutes artillery fire had suppressed the target. The company then ran across the street and began the final clearing of the building. Once this was accomplished the Regiment began its attack on the building on Schulstrasse.

== Postwar ==
On May 2 the division received its second battle honor:

"BERLIN... 23rd Guards Rifle Division (Major General Shafarenko, Pavel Mendelevich)... The troops who participated in the capture of Berlin, by the order of the Supreme High Command of 2 May, 1945, and a commendation in Moscow, are given a salute of 24 artillery salvoes from 324 guns."

On May 28 decorations were awarded to units of the division for their parts in the taking of the German capital; the 63rd and 68th Guards Rifle Regiments both received the Order of Suvorov, 3rd Degree, while the 66th Regiment got the Order of Kutuzov, 3rd Degree and the 28th Guards Antitank Battalion was awarded the Order of the Red Star. On May 31 a total of 13 personnel of the division, including Major Nikin, were made Heroes of the Soviet Union. Among them were Sen. Sergeant Lyudmila Stepanovna Kravets, who took over command from a wounded company commander on April 17 and later evacuated the wounded during the street battles in Berlin.

According to STAVKA Order No. 11095 of May 29, part 2, the 23rd Guards, along with its 12th Guards Rifle Corps and the remainder of 3rd Shock Army, is listed as part of the newly formed Group of Soviet Forces in Germany. Beginning in 1946 this Group was gradually downsized and in 1947 the division was disbanded.
