= 14th Rifle Division (Soviet Union, 1922–1944) =

- Active: 1922–1944
- Country: Soviet Union
- Branch: Red Army
- Type: Infantry
- Size: Division
- Engagements: World War II: Operation Silver Fox; Petsamo-Kirkenes Offensive
- Battle honours: Pechenga

Commanders
- Notable commanders: Kirill Meretskov; Filipp Gorelenko

The 14th Rifle Division (Russian: 14-я стрелковая дивизия) was an infantry division of the Red Army. Formed in Moscow in 1922, the division spent most of the interwar period at Vladimir. After moving to the Kola Peninsula during the Winter War, the division fought on that front during the Continuation War. After the end of the Continuation War it became the 101st Guards Rifle Division.

== History ==
=== Origins and pre-1941 service ===
The 14th Rifle Division traced its lineage back to the formation of guard battalions in Moscow in early 1919, which exclusively served on guard duty. The guard battalions were reorganized into the Separate Guard Regiment in 1920, and a 10 November order combined the 3rd Separate Rifle Brigade of the Internal Service Troops (VNUS) and guard units in Moscow and Moscow Governorate into the 1st Rifle Division of the Internal Service Troops (VNUS), commanded by former commandant of Moscow Nikolay Yakovlev. The 1st Rifle Division of the Internal Service Troops was redesignated as the 36th Rifle Division of the Field Troops by a 4 March 1921 order. The division was part of the Moscow Military District and was disbanded by an order of 8 October 1921 with its troops used to form the 35th Separate Rifle Brigade.

In June 1922, the 35th Separate Rifle Brigade was reorganized as the 14th Moscow Rifle Division of the Moscow Military District. The division included the 103rd Podolsk, 104th Kolomna, and 105th Serpukhov Rifle Regiments from the brigade, and a Separate Training and Education Regiment. The artillery of the division was formed from different artillery units: the 1st Battalion from the Separate Consolidated Training Battery of the 48th Rifle Division, the 2nd Battalion from the 1st Light Training Mechanized Artillery Battalion of the Western Front, and the 3rd Battalion from the 3rd Light Training Battalion of the 35th Brigade. On 3 June the Separate Training and Education Regiment was reorganized as the 40th Rifle Regiment. The 104th Rifle Regiment was redesignated as the 41st Rifle Regiment, and the 103rd and 105th Rifle Regiments combined to form the 42nd Rifle Regiment.

The 14th Rifle Division completed its formation on 1 July. The division became a territorial unit in September 1924, and as a result the 40th and 41st Rifle Regiments and division headquarters relocated to Vladimir. By 1935, the 41st Rifle Regiment was based at Murom and the 42nd Rifle Regiment at Kovrov. The division relocated to Vologda in the Leningrad Military District in October 1938. Its regiments were based in Vologda, Arkhangelsk and Cherepovets. In September 1939, the regiments were each expanded to division strength, resulting in the formation of the new 88th and 168th Rifle Divisions. On 11 September 1939, after mobilization, the division was moved to the Murmansk area with its headquarters in that city, with two rifle regiments defending the coast of the Barents Sea.

During the Winter War, it covered the Soviet border on the northern and northeastern coast of the Kola Peninsula as part of the Murmansk Group of the 14th Army. Companies from the division's 95th Rifle Regiment were operationally detached to the 104th Rifle Division and fought with that unit in battles in north Finland. The division continued to serve with the 14th Army after the end of the Winter War.

=== Continuation War ===
From the beginning of Operation Barbarossa on 22 June 1941, the division fought in defensive battles in the Murmansk sector. When the war began, the division was responsible for a 300 kilometer section of the front along the coast of the Kola Peninsula from Cape Svyatoy Nos to Kildin Island. On the night of 22 June two regiments of the division and the reconnaissance battalion were moved forward to the border with Finland and took positions in a sector from the Barents Sea to the south along the border. On 25 June 1941 the division was reinforced by two regiments of the 52nd Rifle Division. Elements of the German Mountain Corps Norway, after an artillery preparation and bombing raids, launched an attack in the sector of the division on 29 June. The main forces struck the 95th Rifle Regiment, which suffered heavy losses and was unable to contain the German advance. The regiment retreated in disorder to the settlement of Titovka, carrying the approaching 325th Rifle Regiment of the division with it in the retreat. Division commander Aleksandr Zhurba was killed in an air raid during the day but was recorded as missing due to the capture of the only witness, his adjutant. In the first half of July elements of the division and the 23rd Fortified Region, in addition to the approaching 52nd Rifle Division, supported by ships of the Northern Fleet, managed to stop the German advance on the line of the Zapadnaya Litsa river in what became known as the Valley of Glory.

The 325th Rifle Regiment conducted an amphibious landing from Northern Fleet ships on 14 July during the landing operation on the northwest coast of the Bolshaya Zapadnaya Litsa bay, where it fought until 2 August. On that day the regiment was evacuated from the bridgehead and transported by ships to the main forces of the division in the southern part of the Bolshaya Zapadnaya Litsa Bay.

The 135th Rifle Regiment, which fought in isolation from the main forces of the division on the Rybachy and Sredny Peninsulas, was reorganized as the 254th Separate Naval Rifle Brigade on 31 July 1942. In its sector German troops were unable to cross the Soviet border.

Mountain Corps Norway went on the offensive again against the 52nd and 14th Rifle Divisions on 7 September. In the sector of the 14th Rifle Division the German troops crossed the Zapadnaya Litsa, flanking the division on the left. By 14 September the German advance cut the sole supply road from Murmansk to the Zapadnaya Litsa. Between 15 and 22 September the units of the 14th and 186th Rifle Divisions repulsed repeated German attempts to encircle them. The 95th Rifle Regiment and 1st Battalion of the 325th Rifle Regiment launched a counterattack against the German troops on 23 September, together with the 186th. After three days of fighting the units managed to push the German forces across the Zapadnaya Litsa on 25 September, fully restoring the sector of the 14th Rifle Division to its previous positions.

By October 1941, the frontline stabilized on the line of the Zapadnaya Litsa River. The German troops went on the defensive on 22 October. In the sector of the division the German troops were only able to advance between 30 and 60 kilometers. Until October 1944 the frontline remained unchanged. The division fought in small-scale actions. During late April and early May 1942 it participated in the unsuccessful Murmansk Offensive with the units of the 14th Army.

From 7 October 1944 the division took part in the Petsamo-Kirkenes Operation, advancing on the main line of attack northwest of Murmansk, participating in the liberation of the towns of Pechenga, Tarnet, and Kirkenes. The division advanced into northern Norway before the operation ended on 9 November. It was awarded the Pechenga honorific on 29 October in recognition of its performance. After the operation the division was put in reserve. On 1 November it was part of 131st Rifle Corps (with 45th and 368th Rifle Divisions) as part of 14th Army, Karelian Front. The 95th and 155th Rifle Regiments received the Kirkenes honorific and the 325th Rifle Regiment was awarded the Order of Alexander Nevsky on 14 November in recognition of their combat performance. During the war in the Arctic, the division suffered losses of 5,918 killed, 1,187 missing, 135 frozen to death, 217 frostbitten, and 16,351 wounded.

On 30 December, the 14th Rifle Division was reorganized as an elite Guards unit, designated the 101st Guards Rifle Division, as a reward for its performance in the Petsamo–Kirkenes offensive.

== Composition ==
The division included the following units.

- 95th Rifle Regiment
- 325th Rifle Regiment (excluding one battalion moved to the Northern Fleet on 25 August 1942 and renamed the 357th Separate Marine Battalion 3 September 1942)
- 135th Rifle Regiment (until 31 July 1942; converted to the 254th Separate Marine Rifle Brigade)
- 155th Rifle Regiment (from 30 July 1942)
- 143rd Light Artillery Regiment
- 241st Howitzer Artillery Regiment
- 149th Separate Anti-Tank Battalion (from 10 June 1943)
- 364th Separate Mortar Battalion (from 7 November 1941 to 15 November 1942)
- 35th Reconnaissance Company
- 14th Sapper Battalion
- 112th Separate Communications Battalion (later 766th Separate Communications Company)
- 75th Medical Battalion
- 139th Motor Company (later 425th Motor Transport Company, 82nd Motor Transport Battalion)
- 39th Separate Chemical Defense Company
- 285th (later 46th) Field Bakery
- 203rd (later 81st) Divisional Veterinary Hospital
- 669th Field Post Office
- 185th Field Cash Office of the State Bank

== Commanders ==
- Yury Aplok (20 October 1924–1 May 1930)
- Kirill Meretskov (13 May 1930–1 February 1931)
- Zhan Laur (February 1931–July 1937, komdiv 1935)
- Kombrig Filipp Gorelenko (15 June 1937–19 August 1939)
- Colonel Filipp Alyabushev (August–December 1939)
- Major General Aleksandr Zhurba (15 August 1940–29 June 1941)
- Major General Nikolay Nikishin (11 July–13 September 1941)
- Lieutenant Colonel Toivo Tommola (14 September 1941–15 March 1942, colonel 20 February 1942)
- Lieutenant Colonel Khariton Khudalov (16 March–16 July 1942, colonel 27 June 1942)
- Colonel Fyodor Korotkov (16 July 1942–18 October 1944, major general 1 September 1943)
- Colonel Fyodor Grebyonkin (19 October–30 December 1944)
