= Deer transportation battalion =

Military unit

A deer transportation battalion (Russian: оленно-транспортный батальон) was a specialized deer-drawn transportation battalion of the Soviet Red Army on the Eastern Front of World War II. Deer, which were traditionally used by the indigenous peoples of the Russian North as working animals, were deployed as a military transport in November 1941, when horses and mules failed in Arctic conditions. About 12,000 male deer were deployed at the Karelian Front. In November 1941 three deer transportation units were formed in the 14th Soviet Army, each of them included 1,000 deer and 140–150 herdsmen and soldiers. The Komi ASSR was tasked with supplying deer and equipment to the newly-formed units. Deer companies were also created. Deer units were used for communication, transportation of guns and delivery of ammunition, pales and wire for obstacles. On their way back they transported the wounded and killed. The deer units saw the toughest actions in the winters of 1942/43 and 1943/44. Many reindeer herdsmen died from enemy fire. Along with the 14th Army, deer transportation was also used in the 19th Soviet Army.

== Commemoration ==
A Memorial to the Servicemen of the Deer Transportation Battalions was opened on 23 February 2012 in the Russian city of Naryan-Mar. On 18 June 2013 the Memory Day of the Participants of the Deer Transportation Battalions was established in the Nenets Autonomous Okrug, which falls on 20 November.
