= Motovsky Gulf =

Gulf in the Kola Peninsula, Russia

Coordinates: 69°32′N 32°33′E

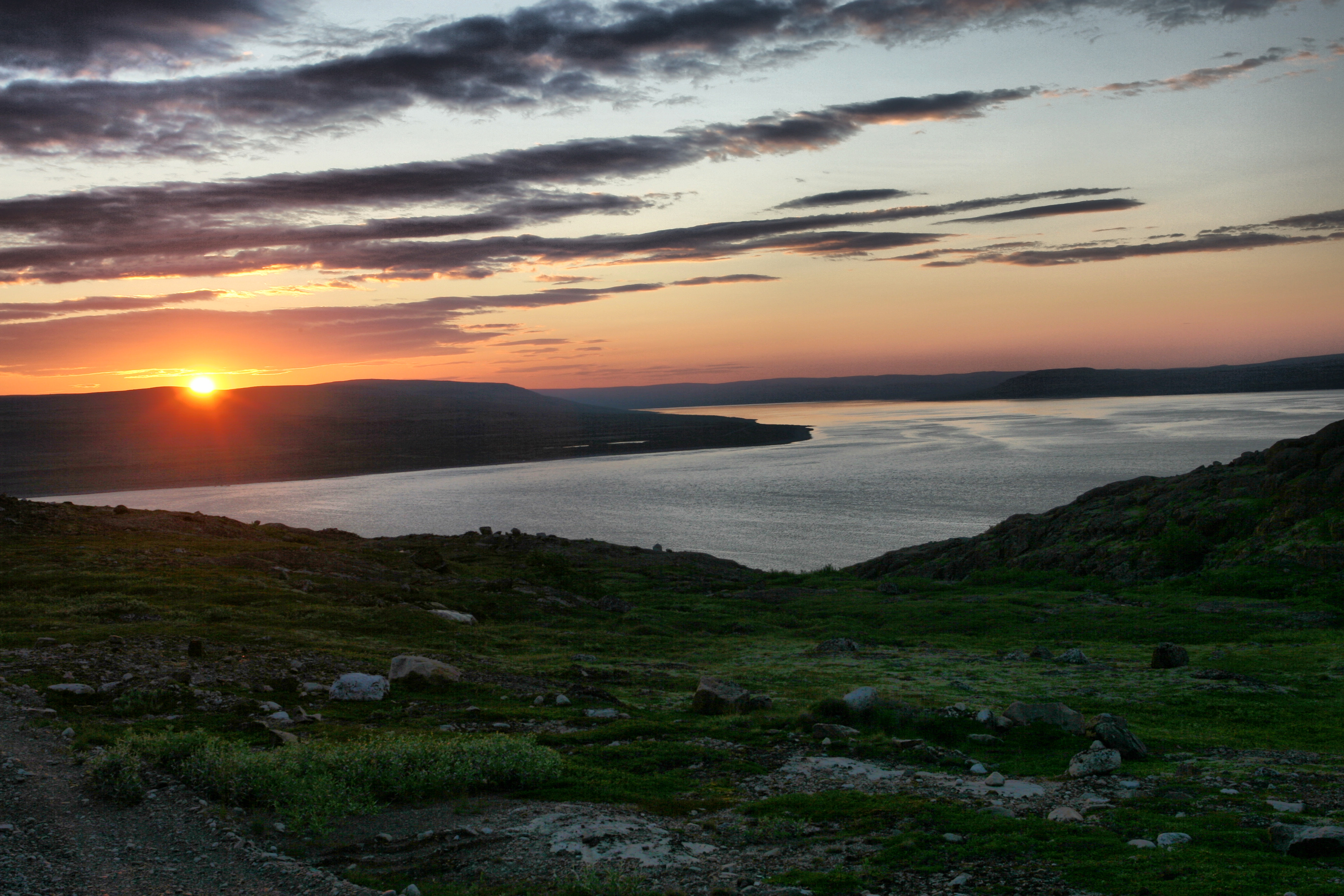
View on the gulf

Motovsky Gulf (Russian: Мотовский залив, Motovsky zaliv) is a body of water off the northwestern coast of the Kola Peninsula, Murmansk Oblast, Russia. The Titovka River flows to the gulf.
