= 42nd Rifle Corps =

- Allegiance: Soviet Union
- Branch: Red Army
- Engagements: World War II; Eastern Front; Operation Barbarossa

The 42nd Rifle Corps was a corps of the Soviet Red Army. It was part of the 14th Army. It took part in the Great Patriotic War. Its initial commander was Major General Roman Ivanovich Panin. The corps was disbanded on 14 October 1941.

The Corps Was formed a second time in May 1943 in the Moscow Military District. The 399th Rifle Division was part of the 42nd Rifle Corps, 48th Army of the 3rd Belorussian Front In Germany in May 1945. The division was disbanded in August 1945, under the command of Lieutenant Colonel Shopovalov after Kazakevich left the division on 7 July 1945.

== Organization ==
- 104th Rifle Division
- 122nd Rifle Division

== Commanders ==
- Major General Roman Panin (14.03.1941 - 23.08.1941),
- Major General Stepan Morozov (24.08.1941 - 14.10.1941),
- Major General, from 29.10.1943 - Lieutenant General Konstantin Kolganov, (01.06.1943 - 09.05.1945)
