= Roman Ivanovich Panin =

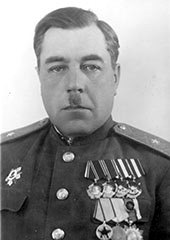
- Born: 28 September 1897; St. Petersburg, Russian Empire
- Died: 1 June 1949 (aged 51); Moscow, Soviet Union
- Military career
- Allegiance: Russian Empire; Russian SFSR; Soviet Union
- Branch: Russian Imperial Army; Red Army (later Soviet Army)
- Service years: 1916–1917; 1919–1949
- Rank: Major General
- Commands: 1st Rifle Corps; 42nd Rifle Corps; 14th Army; 2nd Reserve Army; 7th Rifle Corps; 99th Rifle Corps
- Conflicts: World War I; Russian Civil War; Second Sino-Japanese War; World War II
- Awards: Order of Lenin (2); Order of the Red Banner (2); Order of Kutuzov, 2nd class

Roman Ivanovich Panin (Russian: Роман Иванович Панин; 28 September 1897 – 1 June 1949) was a Soviet major general during World War II. An Imperial Russian Army junior officer in World War I, he joined the Red Army in 1919. Panin fought in the Russian Civil War and continued to serve after the end of the Russian Civil War. He was an advisor to the National Revolutionary Army between 1938 and 1939. Later he participated in the Soviet-Finnish war as a corps commander, and during World War II as the commander of the 14th Army, commanding the defense of Murmansk during Operation Silver Fox. Panin became commander of the 2nd Reserve Army in May 1942 and two months later became a lecturer at the Frunze Military Academy. In February 1943 he became Volkhov Front chief of combat training and in September led the 7th Rifle Corps. After participating in the Leningrad–Novgorod Offensive, Panin briefly led the 99th Rifle Corps. In July 1944, Panin became deputy commander of the 5th Army. Hospitalized in February 1945 during the East Prussian Offensive, Panin did not see further action. After recovering he became an instructor at the Frunze Military Academy and retired in 1949. He died shortly afterwards.

== Early life, World War I, and Russian Civil War ==
Panin was born on 28 September 1897 in Saint Petersburg. In October 1916, he was drafted into the Imperial Russian Army and became a cadet at the Pavel Military School, graduating with the rank of praporshchik in February 1917. Panin was initially served with the 178th Reserve Infantry Regiment before being sent to the Romanian Front in April, where he fought with the 294th Berezina Infantry Regiment. He was treated in a hospital in Petrograd between September 1917 and January 1918, then demobilized.

At the outbreak of the Russian Civil War he joined the Red Army in June 1919, serving as adjutant of the 1st Petrograd Regimental District. From September of that year, Panin served as a company commander of the Red Army detachment on the staff of the Moskovsky-Narvsky district of Petrograd. During this period he fought on the Western Front against the Northwestern Army. Panin became a company commander in the 166th Separate Rifle Battalion in January 1920 and later transferred to command a company of the separate engineer battalion of the Petrograd Military District. In March 1921 he participated in the suppression of the Kronstadt rebellion.

== Interwar ==
After the end of the Civil War Panin served in the Leningrad Military District as a company commander in the 94th Rifle Regiment of the 11th Rifle Division. In 1924 he graduated from the Vystrel courses for military commander training. In February 1926 Panin became a battalion commander of the 59th Rifle Regiment of the 20th Rifle Division, simultaneously serving as assistant regimental commander. He was appointed commander of the division's 60th Rifle Regiment in April 1931. In November 1936, Panin became deputy commander of the 16th Rifle Division. Between July 1938 and October 1939 he served as a military advisor to the National Revolutionary Army in China. In this capacity he advised Zhang Fakui in Xinpu. In late September 1938, he became advisor to the 4th War Area, which was commanded by Zhang Fakui. Panin later advised Bai Chongxi in Guilin.

== Winter War and World War II ==
After returning from China, Panin was appointed commander of the 1st Rifle Corps at Pskov in the Leningrad Military District on 21 October 1939. The corps fought in the Winter War. The three divisions of the corps, part of the 8th Army, were to attack towards Ilomantsi and Korpiselkä. The attack pushed the defending Finnish troops back from the border and captured Suoyarvi on 2 December. After capturing Suoyarvi, Panin sent his 155th Rifle Division towards Ilomantsi and the 139th Rifle Division towards Tolvajärvi and Korpiselka. The 155th Rifle Division was stopped by Finnish counterattacks in the Möhkö-Oinassalmi area. The 56th Rifle Division, after the capture of Suoyarvi, attacked the Finnish positions on the Kollaa and was unable to break through. The 139th Rifle Division fought in the Battle of Tolvajärvi on 12 December and retreated after the battle. On the next day, Panin was replaced by Dmitry Kozlov and transferred to the reserve.

In June 1940, Panin was appointed head of combat training for the Leningrad Military District. He was promoted to Major General on 4 June. In March 1941, he became commander of the 42nd Rifle Corps. After the German invasion of the Soviet Union on 22 June, the corps became part of the 14th Army. It fought in the defense of Murmansk during Operation Silver Fox. On 24 August 1941, Panin became commander of the 14th Army, leading it in the defense of Murmansk. He was considered incompetent by Murmansk CPSU Regional Committee First Secretary and 14th Army Military Council member Maxim Starostin and later appointed commander of the 2nd Reserve Army in May 1942. In August 1942 Panin became a senior lecturer at the Frunze Military Academy. In February 1943, he was appointed chief of combat training for the Volkhov Front. Panin became commander of the 7th Rifle Corps of the 59th Army in September, leading it in the Leningrad–Novgorod Offensive and the capture of Novgorod. For his leadership in the offensive Panin was awarded the Order of Kutuzov 2nd class on 21 February 1944. Between April and May 1944 he was commander of the 99th Rifle Corps of the 3rd Baltic Front. In May, Panin was at the disposal of the chief of staff. In June he visited the 3rd Belorussian Front with Aleksandr Vasilevsky. One month later he became deputy commander of the 5th Army, participating in Operation Bagration and the East Prussian Offensive. In February 1945, he was hospitalized and from May 1945 was again at the disposal of the chief of staff.

== Postwar ==
After the war Panin became head of a course at the Frunze Military Academy. He retired in 1949 and died in Moscow on 1 June 1949. He was buried in the Novodevichy Cemetery.

== Awards and decorations ==
Order of Lenin, twice (16 August 1936, 2 December 1945)
Order of the Red Banner, twice (22 February 1939, 3 November 1944)
Order of Kutuzov, 2nd class (22 February 1944)
Medal "For the Defence of Leningrad" (1942)
Medal "For the Victory over Germany in the Great Patriotic War 1941–1945" (1945)
Jubilee Medal "XX Years of the Workers' and Peasants' Red Army" (1938)
Jubilee Medal "30 Years of the Soviet Army and Navy" (1948)
Order of the Cloud and Banner with Special Grand Cordon (Republic of China)
