= 52nd Rifle Division (Soviet Union, 1935–1941) =

- Active: 1935–1941
- Country: Soviet Union
- Branch: Red Army
- Type: Infantry
- Size: Division
- Engagements: World War II; Invasion of Poland; Winter War; Operation Platinum Fox

The 52nd Rifle Division was an infantry division of the Red Army during the interwar period and World War II. It was transformed into the 10th Guards Rifle Division on December 26, 1941.

== Formation ==
In accordance with a Moscow Military District directive of 11 April 1935, the division was formed at Yaroslavl from a cadre provided by the 18th Rifle Division. It was part of the Moscow Military District until 1936, when it relocated to the Byelorussian Military District. The 52nd Rifle Division took part in the invasion of Poland in 1939 and the Winter War with Finland from November 1939 to March 1940. It became part of the Leningrad Military District for the latter.

== Operation Barbarossa ==
At the outbreak of the German invasion in 1941, the 52nd was in the far north, near Murmansk. On 25 June, the 158th and 112th Regiments were transferred by sea to the 14th Rifle Division.

Due to its skill in defending the vital port of Murmansk the 52nd Rifle Division became one of the first and few formations raised to Guards status in the Arctic, as the 10th Guards Rifle Division on Dec. 26.

The division remained in that region until late 1944, when it was transferred to 2nd Belorussian Front and took part in the invasion of Germany.

== Bibliography ==
- Dvoinykh, L.V.; Kariaeva, T.F.; Stegantsev, M.V., eds. (1993). Центральный государственный архив Советской армии [Central State Archive of the Soviet Army] (in Russian). Vol. 2. Minneapolis: Eastview Publications. ISBN 1-879944-03-0.
