= Juhani Kakkuri =

Finnish geodesist (1933–2022)

Juhani Antero Kakkuri (September 12, 1933 – August 6, 2022) was a Finnish geodesist, writer, and former director of the Finnish Geodetic Institute.

Kakkuri was born in Kurikka, Finland on September 12, 1933. He lived his childhood there, but moved to Helsinki for upper secondary school, continuing his education at the University of Helsinki, where he studied geophysics and physics. He received a Master of Science degree in 1960.

In 2021, the autobiographical memoir Muistelmia geodeettien maailmasta – Memoirs From the World of Geodesy was published bilingually in Finnish and English. In recognition of his career, he was awarded an honorary doctorate from the University of Stuttgart. The minor planet 3597 Kakkuri is also named in his honor.
