= 14th Army (Soviet Union) =

- 14-я армия
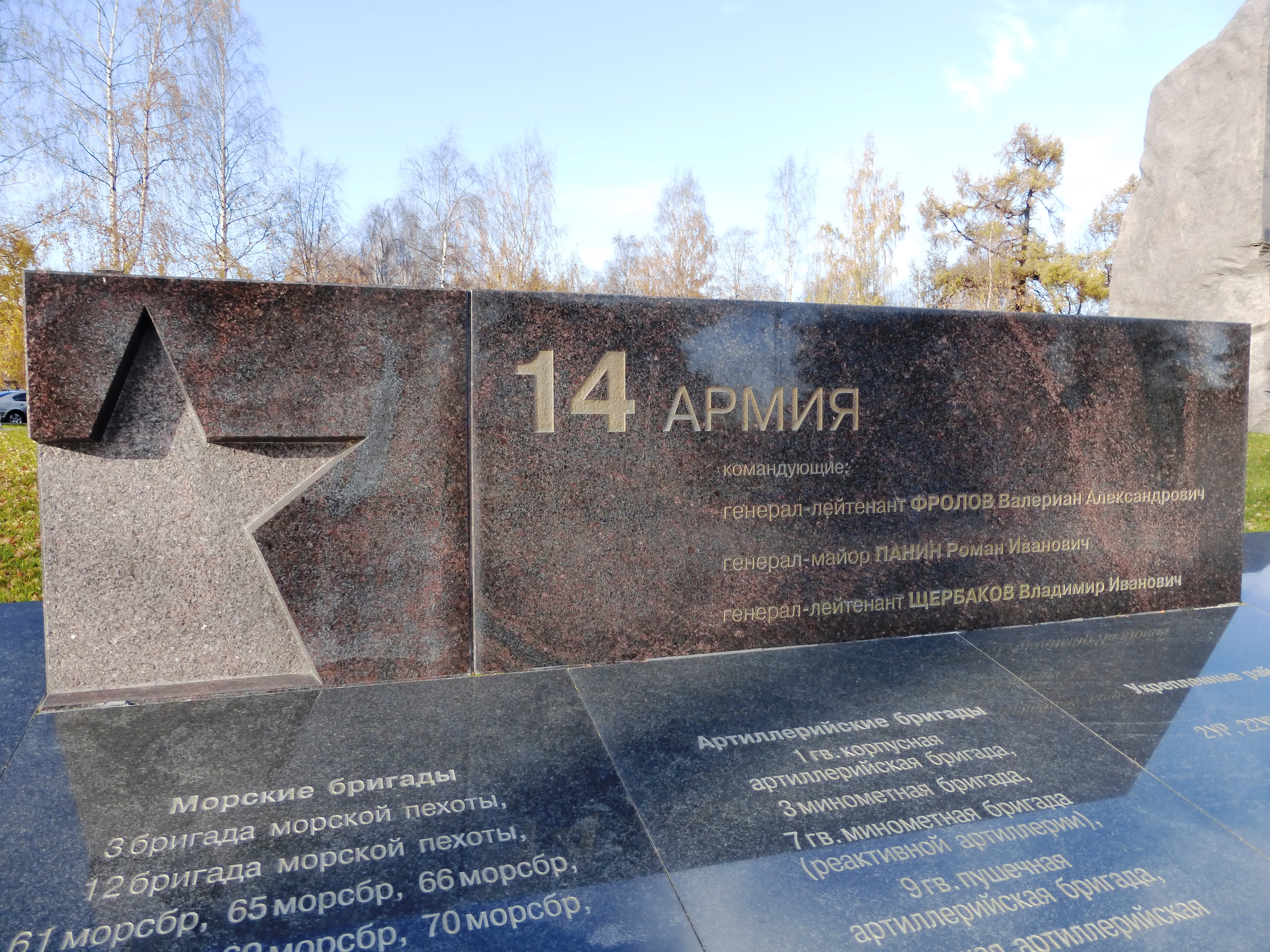
- Military memorial of the 14th Army in Russian (Military memorial of the Karelian Front)
- Active: October 1939 – 1945 (1st Formation); 1948–1953 (2nd Formation)
- Country: Soviet Union
- Type: Combined arms
- Size: Field army
- Part of: Northern Front; Karelian Front
- Engagements: World War II; Winter War; Petsamo-Kirkenes Operation

Commanders
- Notable commanders: Valerian A. Frolov

The 14th Army (Russian: 14-я армия, romanized: 14-ya armiya) was a field army of the Soviet Army, formed twice.

The army was first formed during the Winter War, in which two of its divisions fought in the Battle of Petsamo. After Operation Barbarossa, the army fought against German and Finnish attacks in Operation Silver Fox. In the middle of July 1941, the army was able to hold its positions. In October 1944, it fought in the Petsamo–Kirkenes Offensive and seized Pechenga. The army defended and guarded the newly captured territory until the end of the war. Its headquarters became the Belomorsky Military District at the end of July 1945. The army reformed in June 1948 from the 126th Light Mountain Rifle Corps as the 14th Army (Assault). Stationed on the Chukchi Peninsula, the army's mission was to invade Alaska in event of a war. It was disbanded in May 1953 after Stalin's death.

== History ==
The first 14th Army was formed in October 1939 in the Leningrad Military District. It participated in the Soviet-Finnish war, during which its 52nd and 104th Rifle Divisions fought in the Battle of Petsamo.

From 24 June 1941, the army included the following units:

- 42nd Rifle Corps (Ist Formation 22 June 1941, disbanded 14 October 1941; was used to reinforce the Kandalksha operational group):
  - 293rd Separate signals battalion
  - 279th separate sapper battalion
  - 104th Rifle Division
  - 122nd Rifle Division
- 14th Rifle Division
- 52nd Rifle Division
- 1st Tank Division
- 23rd Murmansk Fortified Region
- 1st Mixed Air Division (HQ Murmansk, Colonel M.M. Golovnya, disbanded February 1942):
  - 137th Fighter Aviation Regiment (Afrikanda) (SB)
  - 145th Fighter Aviation Regiment (Shangui) (38 I-153)
  - 147th Fighter Aviation Regiment (Murmashi) (36 I-153); Leonid Ivanov won the Hero of the Soviet Union posthumously while flying with this regiment up to his death on 27 June 1941.
- 258th Fighter Aviation Division, which was formed from the Air Forces of the 14th Army in 1942.

The army was initially subordinated to the Northern Front and conducted defensive operations on the Murmansk, Kandalaksha and Ukhta directions against the German-Finnish Operation Silver Fox (29 June 1941 – 19 September 1941) and in coordination with the 7th Separate Army, in the Defensive Operations on the Petrozavodsk, Ukhtinsk, Rugozersk, and Olonetsk directions (1 July 1941 – 10 October 1941). In November 1941 three deer transportation units were formed in the 14th Army, each of them included 1,000 deer and 140–150 herdsmen and soldiers. From the middle of July the 14th Army was able to stop Finnish enemy forces advance, and subsequently until October 1944 (from 23 August 1941 as part of the Karelian Front) it solidly retained its sector positions, and conducted active offensive combat for the purpose of improvement in the position it occupied.

On 18 October 1944, the 14th Army after rearrangement was involved in the second stage of the Petsamo-Kirkenes Operation. From south to north in the battle, the 127th Light Rifle Corps, the reserve of the 31st Rifle Corps, 99th Rifle Corps, 126th Light Rifle Corps, and 131st Rifle Corps were introduced. At that time, battles were mainly in the pursuit of the retreating enemy. The 127th Light Rifle Corps and the 31st Rifle Corps advanced on the Nickel, the 99th Rifle Corps and the 126th Light Rifle Corps on Ahmalahti, and the 131st Rifle Corps on Tarnet.

By 20 October 1944, the 127th Light Rifle Corps and 31st Rifle Corps semicircle covered Nickel from the north, south and south-west, 21 October 1944 126th Light Rifle Corps reached the lake Klistervati, 99th Rifle Corps 22 October 1944 released the road Ahmalahti – Kirkenes. 131st Rifle Corps has released 10/17/1944 to the state border and entered 18 October 1944 on Norwegian soil. Nickel was taken 22 October 1944.

Forcing Yar Fjord on 24–25 October 1944, the army troops fanned out in Norway. The 31st Rifle Corps, without forcing the bay, and ran down the deep south, and reached Nausta on 27 October 1944, coming on the Norwegian-Finnish border. The 127th Light Rifle Corps carried out an offensive attack in the same direction on the western shore of the Fjord. The 126th Light Rifle Corps undertook deep inroads in the west and reached the city of Neiden on 27 October 1944. The 99th Rifle Corps and the 131st Rifle Corps rushed to Kirkenes, which was released on 25 October 1944, the then 99th Rifle Corps also sent the city Neiden.

By 29 October 1944, the Petsamo-Kirkenes operation was over, and with it the 14th Army's combat role. While the German forces evacuated and burned the far north of Norway, using scorched earth tactics, the Soviet advance was halted at the Tana River. Norwegian forces arrived to occupy the area between Soviet and German forces and support those civilians who had refused to evacuate. The 14th Army had taken the city of Petsamo (today Pechenga). Subsequently, until the end of the war the army defended the newly occupied territory and the state borders of the USSR with Finland and Norway.

== Commanding officers ==
- Lieutenant General V. A. Frolov (October 1939 – August 1941)
- Major General Roman Ivanovich Panin (August 1941 – March 1942)
- Major General Vladimir I. Shcherbakov (March 1942 – May 1945), from the end of April 1943 lieutenant general.

On 31 July 1945 the army headquarters was disbanded and the personnel were used to fill out Headquarters Belomorsky Military District.

== 14th Assault Army (1948–1953) ==
The army was reformed in June 1948 from the 126th Light Mountain Rifle Corps as the 14th Army (Assault). According to some data, there were plans for its use in Chukchi Peninsula and, in the case of war, landing in Alaska. The army included the 116th, 117th and 121st Rifle Divisions, all former mountain rifle brigades. These divisions were not equipped like standard rifle divisions and lacked tank and antitank artillery battalions. The army included the 1221st and 1222nd Separate Cannon Artillery Regiments, the 280th Separate Engineer-Sapper Battalion and the 187th and 493rd Separate Communications Battalions as well as the 687th and 1252nd Separate Communications Companies.
It was commanded by Lieutenant General Nikolay Oleshev.
In 1949, the 95th Mixed Aviation Division (converted to fighters in 1952) at Anadyr became part of the army.
On 4 May 1951, Major General Georgy Latyshev took command of the army. Lieutenant General Ivan Rubanyuk became the army commander on 14 April 1952.
The army was disbanded in May 1953 after Stalin's death.

== Sources ==
- Feskov, V.I.; Golikov, V.I.; Kalashnikov, K.A.; Slugin, S.A. (2013). Вооруженные силы СССР после Второй Мировой войны: от Красной Армии к Советской [The Armed Forces of the USSR after World War II: From the Red Army to the Soviet] (in Russian). Vol. 1 Land Forces. Tomsk: Tomsk University Press. ISBN 9785895035306.
- Lenskii, Ground forces of RKKA in the pre-war years: a reference (Сухопутные силы РККА в предвоенные годы. Справочник.) — St Petersburg, B & K, 2000
