= 19th Army (Soviet Union) =

- 19-я армия
- Active: 1941 – 1945
- Country: Soviet Union
- Branch: Red Army
- Type: Combined arms
- Size: Field Army; Two or more Rifle corps
- Part of: Reserve of the Supreme High Command, Western Front, 2nd Belorussian Front
- Engagements: Operation Barbarossa, others

Commanders
- Notable commanders: General Ivan Koniev

The 19th Army (Russian: 19-я армия) was a field army of the Soviet Union's Red Army, formed in 1941 and active during the Second World War. The army was formed three times, although only two of its formations saw combat.

Its third formation was disbanded in June 1945 and its troops used to reinforce the Northern Group of Forces.

== First formation ==
The army was first formed in June 1941 in the North Caucasus Military District under the command of General Lieutenant Ivan Konev. Division Commissar I.P. Sheklanov became member of the Army's Military Soviet. Initially the army consisted of

- 25th Rifle Corps (127th Rifle Division, 134th Rifle Division, and 162nd Rifle Division)
- 34th Rifle Corps (129th Rifle Division, 158th Rifle Division, and 171st Rifle Division)
- 38th Rifle Division
- 442nd Corps Artillery Regiment
- 471st Corps Artillery Regiment
- and other units.

Sources disagree as to whether a Mechanized Corps, either the 25th or the 26th, was directly subordinate to the Army as well. Three weeks before the outbreak of war the 19th Army was sent by rail to Ukraine in the Cherkassy region. The army received orders from the People's Commissar for Defence, Marshal Semyon Timoshenko, to defend the Kiev Fortified Region.

From 25 June 1941, the Army was included in the Group of Reserve Armies of the Highest Command (Stavka). The 19th Army was transferred by rail to Vitebsk, Rudnia, Smolensk. On 2 July, army was included into Western Front. The transfer by rail took more time than was expected. On 9 July the first units to arrive received orders to deny Vitebsk to the enemy and attack in the western direction and reach the western bank of Dvina. On the contrary, to the 11 July enemy brushed away Soviet forces from Vitebsk. On 11 July, the 19th Army was strengthened by 7th Mechanized Corps and on the next day attacked Vitebsk anew. At that time the enemy had the initiative. To the 16 July, German forces struck through Yartsevo to Smolensk. Three Soviet armies (16th, 20th and 19th) found themselves in the operational encirclement. On 14 July, 19th Army Headquarters received orders to transfer its troops to the 16th Army and to move to the Kardumovo region, and then Yartsevo. 19th Army Staff with great effort broke out of the encirclement near Wadino and received new divisions under its command. Those new forces took defensive positions on the river Vol.

During August–September 1941, 19th Army took part in the Battle of Smolensk and tried to destroy the enemy Dukhowszczina group. In the middle of August, the army was strengthened with rifle, cavalry, and tank divisions, two gun artillery regiments, three artillery divisions and two batteries of rocket artillery (Katyusha) along with air support from the 43rd Mixed Aviation Division. Despite these reinforcements the army was not able to perform its task. A new attack on 1 September on Smolensk was also unsuccessful. On 10 September, the army took defensive positions. On 12 September, Konev became the commander of Western Front and General Lieutenant M.F. Lukin became the new commander of 19th Army.

In October 1941, forces of the 19th Army fought in the Vyazma Defensive Operation (2–13 October). The army was surrounded by enemy forces southwest of Jelnya. In the middle of October part of the army fought its way out of the encirclement to the Mozhaisk defence line. The Army commander M.F. Lukin and Chief of Staff General Major Vasily Malyshkin became prisoners of war. The member of the Military Soviet of the Army Divisional Commissar I.P. Sheklanov died in action. General Lieutenant Ivan Boldin then took command, but soon afterwards the army was disbanded, on 20 October 1941.

The army's chief of staff was General Major P.N. Rubtsov, from June to July 1941, and then Colonel W.F. Malyschkin, who was promoted to General Major from October 1941.

Army Commanders

- Lieutenant General Ivan Konev (маy — September 1941),
- Lieutenant General Michael Lukin (September — October 1941),
- Lieutenant General Ivan Boldin (20 october — 24 November 1941).

== 19th Army 2nd formation ==
The army was formed on the basis of a STAVKA Directive from 20 November 1941 in the Reserve of the Supreme High Command. By STAVKA order from 23 November 1941, army was reformed into 1st Shock Army under direct command of STAVKA.

Army Commander

Lieutenant General Vasily Kuznetsov

Army's chief of staff

Major General Nikanor Zakhvatayev

== 19th Army 3rd formation ==
Formed on 4 April 1942 on the base of STAVKA Directive from 27 March 1942. Army was formed on a base of Kandalaksha Operational Group which was a part of the Karelian Front. The Army's units were 104th and 122nd Rifle Divisions, 77th Marine Rifle Brigade, 4th Ski Brigade, two separate tank battalions and some artillery and other units.

99th Rifle Corps was also active with the army for a time.

Up until December 1944 the Army was defending the Kandalaksha direction. In September, her forces defeated enemy Allakurti group and by the months end reached the USSR state border with Finland on river Naruska-Joki, lake Onikamo-Jarvi where the army went on the defence. On 15 November 1944 army was transferred into the Stavka Reserve and in January 1945 it was positioned near Grodno and Białystok.

On 29 January 1945, the Army was subordinated to the 2nd Belorussian Front (2nd Formation). Then it took part in the East Pomeranian Offensive (10 February-4 April) during which course on 5 March it advanced to the coast of the Baltic Sea north of Koslin (Koszalin) and had an important role in the destruction of the east-Pomeranian enemy group. Next, the army together with 1st Guards Army, 70th Army and forces of the Baltic Fleet destroyed the enemy Gdynia group and entered port of Gdynia (28 March). In April-beginning of May the units of the army took part in destruction of enemy group in western coast of Danzig Bay. Then, in cooperation with the 2nd Shock Army, the army cleared Wolin peninsula, and Usedom and Rugia islands. On 9 May army received the capitulation of the German units on the Hel peninsula.

On 1 May 1945 the army consisted of the 132nd Rifle Corps (18th, 27th, and 205th Rifle Divisions), the 134th Rifle Corps (10th Guards Rifle Division, 310th Rifle Division, 313th Rifle Divisions), the 91st and 153rd Fortified Regions (УР), the 204th Guards Artillery Brigade, the 884th Anti-Tank Artillery Regiment, the 268th Mortar Regiment, and the 186th Anti-Aircraft Artillery Regiment (зенап).

The army and its headquarters were disbanded and elements of their troops used to reinforce the Northern Group of Forces on 10 June 1945, in accordance with a Stavka directive on the formation of the Northern Group of Forces dated 29 May.

Army Commanders

General Major Stepan Morozov (March 1942- May 1943)
General Major from February 1944- General Lieutenant Georgy Kozlov (May 1943-March 1945)
General Lieutenant Vladimir Zakharovich Romanovsky (March 1945 - to the war's end)

Members of the Military Soviet of Army

Brigade Commissar from December 1942 Colonel Kalinovsky A.P. (April 1942-March 1944)
General Major Pankov S.i (March 1944 - to the war's end)

Chiefs of Staff

Colonel from January 1943- General Major Markuschevich S.A. (April 1942-March 1945)
General Lieutenant Ljapin P.I. (March 1945-to the war's end)

== Sources ==
- Feskov, V.I.; Golikov, V.I.; Kalashnikov, K.A.; Slugin, S.A. (2013). Вооруженные силы СССР после Второй Мировой войны: от Красной Армии к Советской [The Armed Forces of the USSR after World War II: From the Red Army to the Soviet: Part 1 Land Forces] (in Russian). Tomsk: Scientific and Technical Literature Publishing. ISBN 9785895035306.
- "Vielikaja Otczestvennaja Dziestvuszovaja Armija file". www.soldat.ru. Archived from the original on 2009-08-30.
- Boevoi Sostav Sovietskoi Armii. czast I juni-dekabr 1941 goda, Moskva 1966
- https://web.archive.org/web/20081216013802/http://docs.vif2.ru/
