= Petsamo–Kirkenes offensive =

Soviet campaign on the Eastern Front during World War II

- Part of Eastern Front of World War II
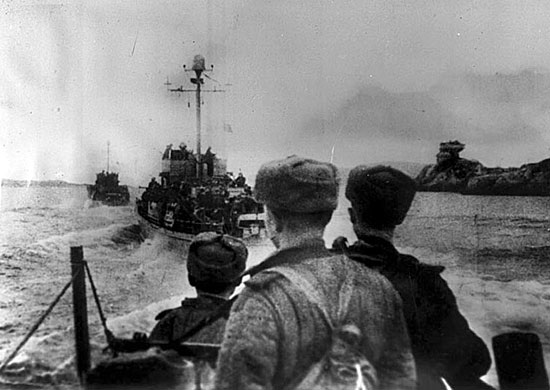
- Soviet landing party heading for Kirkenes, Norway.
Date	7–29 October 1944 (3 weeks and 1 day)
Location	Arctic Region, Petsamo and northern Norway 69°25′40″N 31°13′41″E
Result	Soviet victory

Belligerents
Soviet Union	Germany: Quisling regime

Commanders and leaders
(Soviet Union) Kirill Meretskov (Soviet Union) Vladimir Shcherbakov	(Nazi Germany) Lothar Rendulic

Strength
14th Army; 133,500 men 110 tanks 2,100 guns	20th Mountain Army; 45,000 men 145 guns

Casualties and losses
6,084 killed or missing 15,149 wounded 21,233 overall	8,263 overall (whole of October) (Note: Less than half of the 8,263 overall casualties were killed or missing in action. The Germans "escaped with the bulk of their forces intact")

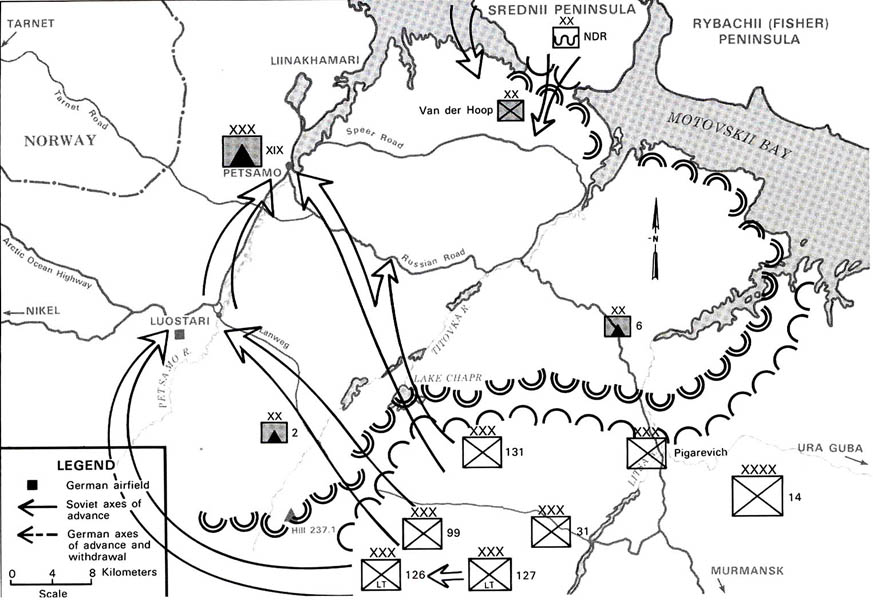
Soviet planning for the operation

The Petsamo–Kirkenes offensive was a major military offensive during World War II, mounted by the Red Army against the Wehrmacht in 1944 in the Petsamo region, ceded to the Soviet Union by Finland in accordance with the Moscow Armistice, and Norway. The offensive defeated the Wehrmacht's forces in the Arctic, driving them back into Norway, and was called the "Tenth Shock" by Stalin. It later expelled German forces from the northern part of Norway and seized the nickel mines of Petsamo.

== Situation ==
In the aftermath of the failed German–Finnish offensive, Operation Silver Fox, in 1941, the frontlines in the Arctic had seen little change. Environmental and supply conditions in the remote, nearly roadless region made it difficult, if not impossible, to undertake major military operations, and as far as land warfare was concerned, the Arctic had become a backwater. Considerable German forces were deployed in the sector to protect the Finnish nickel mines of Petsamo, which were of importance to German armour plate fabrication, and to guard the coast of northern Norway against an Allied landing operation.

After the armistice between the Soviet Union and Finland on 4 September 1944, the Petsamo region (though still largely occupied by the Germans) became part of the Russian SFSR, and the Finnish government agreed to remove the remaining German troops from its territory by 15 September (leading to the Lapland War). During the retreat of the Wehrmacht 20th Mountain Army, called Operation Birke, the decision was made by the Oberkommando der Wehrmacht to withdraw completely from northern Norway and Finland in Operation Nordlicht. During the preparations for this operation, the Russians went over to the offensive on the Karelian Front.

== Preparations ==
The Stavka decided to move against the German forces in the Arctic in late 1944. The operation was to be undertaken jointly by the Karelian Front under the command of General Kirill Meretskov and the Northern Fleet under Admiral Arseniy Golovko. The main operations were to be conducted by the 14th Army, which had been in the Arctic since the beginning of the war. Meretskov was provided with several units specially configured to meet the requirements for operations in the far north. The 126th and 127th Rifle Corps consisted of light infantry with a number of ski troops and naval infantry. The Soviets also had 30 engineer battalions, numerous horse- and reindeer-equipped transportation companies, and two battalions equipped with US-supplied amphibious vehicles for river crossings. In addition, the Soviets massed thousands of mortars and artillery pieces, 750 aircraft, and 110 tanks (while the Germans lacked any armour), making Soviet forces far superior to the Germans.

Soviet preparations, which had lasted for two months, had not gone unnoticed by the Germans. The highly capable General Lothar Rendulic, who served as both head of the 20th Mountain Army and overall theater commander, was well aware of the threat posed by the upcoming offensive. Prior to the start of the Soviet drive, the defending Germans had been ordered to abandon Petsamo on 15 October, and Kirkenes by the beginning of November.

== Offensive ==
The offensive can be divided into three phases: the breakthrough of the German position, the pursuit to Kirkenes, and the battle for Kirkenes, including the southward pursuit that followed it. During the offensive several amphibious landings were conducted by naval infantry and army units. Initially, the Germans' intended withdrawal was hampered by Hitler's strict orders to Rendulic to evacuate all supplies from the Petsamo region before abandoning it.

Despite intensive planning before the offensive, the initial attack on 7 October immediately met with problems. Poor visibility made it difficult to co-ordinate artillery and fire support, slowing the assault; nevertheless, after some fierce fighting the Soviets broke through the German lines on the Titovka River. Blowing up the bridges behind them, the Germans retreated. The Soviets pursued, and over the following days conducted several amphibious landings to cut off the German forces. On 10 October the Germans shifted the 163rd Division, which was already withdrawing from Finland to Norway, to the Petsamo region to bolster their defenses. On 13 October the Soviets were poised to attack German forces around the town of Petsamo, and units of the 126th light Rifle Corps were able to establish a roadblock on the only escape route; however, troops of the German 2nd Mountain Division were able to clear the roadblock on 14 October, securing the retreat of Rendulic's forces. The Soviets captured Petsamo on 15 October, but due to supply problems, then had to halt the offensive for three days.

For the rest of the campaign the Soviets advanced after the withdrawing Germans along the coast of Norway, with the Soviets trying to block and cut off German units on their retreat. But because of constant supply shortcomings and German delaying efforts, which forced sizable forces to be detached to road reconstruction, the Soviets were not able to achieve success and the Germans escaped with the bulk of their forces intact. The Germans abandoned Kirkenes on 25 October and finally on 29 October Meretskov halted all operations except reconnaissance.

== Outcome ==
The Soviet offensive ended with a victory for the Red Army, but the Wehrmacht 20th Mountain Army successfully performed an orderly retreat with the bulk of its forces intact as it did against Finnish forces during their retreat through Lapland carried out at the same time. Soviet failure to inflict clear defeat on the withdrawing Germans was largely due to the supply issues caused by efficient German destruction of road connections in the area. With often the only road available being out of service due to damage and mines, both supplies and heavy equipment, like artillery, could not be transported to front lines in sufficient quantities while lighter equipped forces were at a disadvantage against heavily armed German forces.

The Soviet commander Meretskov was promoted to Marshal of the Soviet Union, and was given a prominent command during the Soviet invasion of Manchuria in August 1945. The Petsamo–Kirkenes offensive was the last major offensive in an Arctic environment. It was studied intensively in the Soviet Army for this reason.

In Soviet historiography, this offensive was listed as one of Stalin's ten blows.

== Forces involved ==
=== Soviet ===
- 14th Army (Vladimir Shcherbakov), total; 113,200 men
  - 31st Rifle Corps
  - 99th Rifle Corps
  - 131st Rifle Corps
  - Corps Pigarevich
  - 126th (light) Rifle Corps
  - 127th (light) Rifle Corps
- Northern Fleet total; 20,300 men

=== German ===
- 20th Mountain Army
  - XIX Mountain Corps, total; 45,000 men
    - 2nd Mountain Division
    - 6th Mountain Division
      - Grenadier Regiment 388 attached
    - 210th Infantry Division (a fortress division)
    - Division Group van der Hoop (regiment strength)
    - Bicycle Brigade Norway (regiment strength)

== Bibliography ==
- Ahto, Sampo (1980). Aseveljet vastakkain – Lapin sota 1944–1945 [Brothers in arms against each other – Lapland War 1944–1945] (in Finnish). Helsinki: Kirjayhtymä. ISBN 951-26-1726-9.
- Glantz, David M.; House, Jonathan (1995). When Titans Clashed: How the Red Army Stopped Hitler. Lawrence, Kansas: University Press of Kansas. ISBN 0-7006-0899-0.
