= Zapadnaya Litsa (river) =

River in Murmansk Oblast, Russia

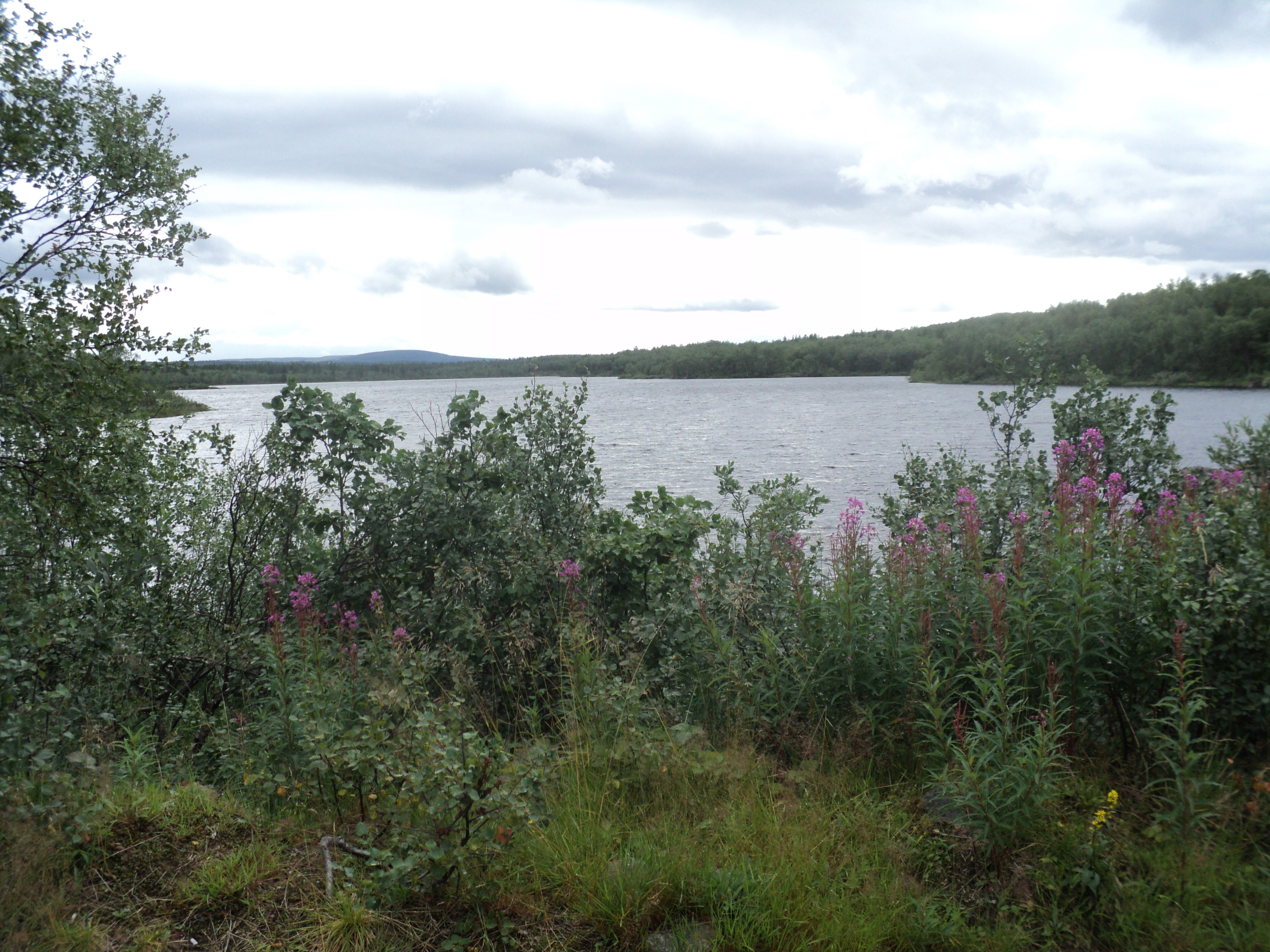

- Mouth of the Zapadnaya Litsa
- Native name: Западная Лица (Russian)

Location
- Country: Russia
- Region: Murmansk Oblast

Physical characteristics
- Source
  - location: Kuchintundra
  - elevation: 250 m (820 ft)
- Mouth: Barents Sea
  - coordinates: 69°25′37″N 32°16′50″E
- Length: 101 km (63 mi)
- Basin size: 1,690 km^{2} (650 sq mi)

The Zapadnaya Litsa (Russian: Западная Лица; German: Sapadnaja Liza; Finnish: Litsajoki) is a river in the north of the Kola Peninsula in Murmansk Oblast, Russia. It is 101 kilometres (63 mi) long, and has a drainage basin of 1,690 square kilometres (650 sq mi). The Zapadnaya Litsa River originates on the Kuchintundra and flows into the Barents Sea. Its biggest tributary is the Lebyazhka River.

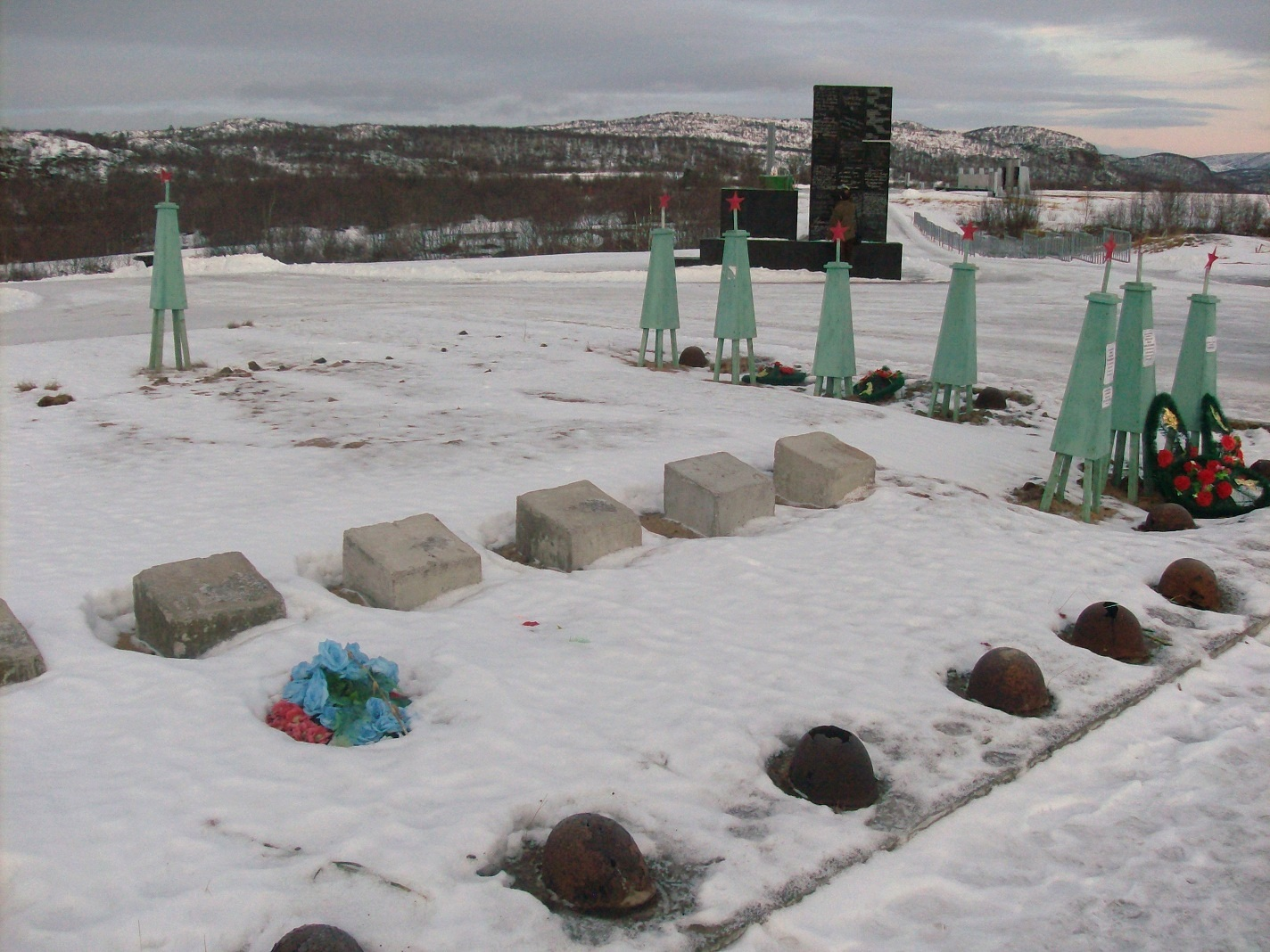
"Memorial for the Defenders of the Soviet Arctic" on the Litsa River

From 1941 to 1944, the Litsa River formed the Arctic frontline between German and Finnish troops west of the river – trying to capture Murmansk – and Soviet troops on the east, defending the city. This frontier was of vital importance for both sides, as Murmansk was the only Soviet harbour left in Europe and the northern route to Murmansk and Arkhangelsk supplied the Soviet Union with approximately 25% of all lend-lease aid. During the stalemate that lasted four years, thousands perished in the tundras on both sides of the river. At the time the Litsa valley was called Death Valley (Долина смерти, Dolina smerti) by the Soviets; though later the expression Valley of Honor (Долина славы, Dolina slavy) became fashionable. The defense of Murmansk succeeded; the Germans never reached the city and the supply lines were not seriously interrupted, although the Germans bombed Murmansk to rubble from occupied Norway. See also: Operation Silver Fox and Operation Platinum Fox. The remains of the WWII fighting (trenches, pillboxes, defense pits etc.) can be visited with some specialised travel agencies.

== Memorial for the Defenders of the Soviet Arctic on Litsa River (images) ==
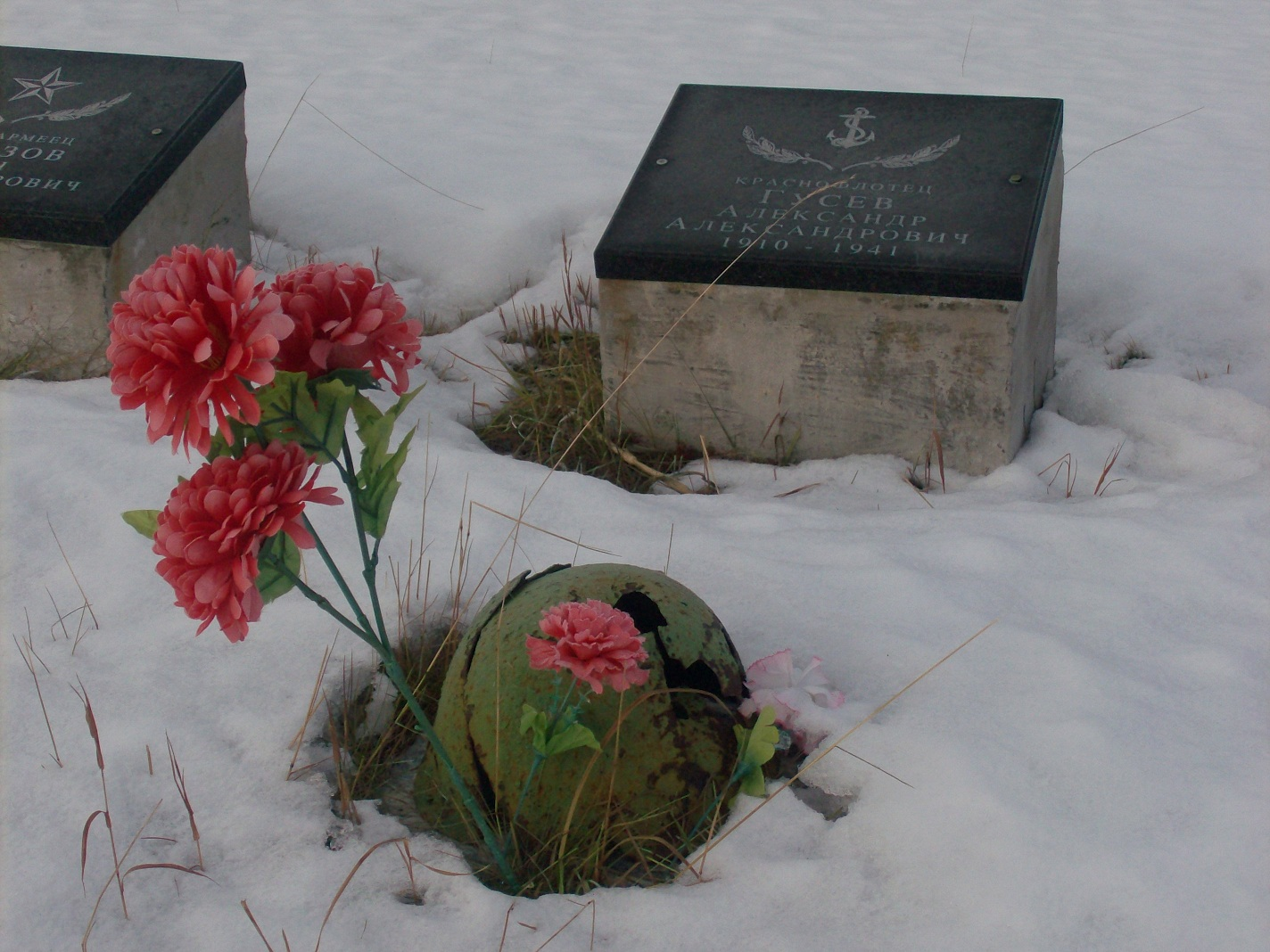
Grave with helmet and flowers

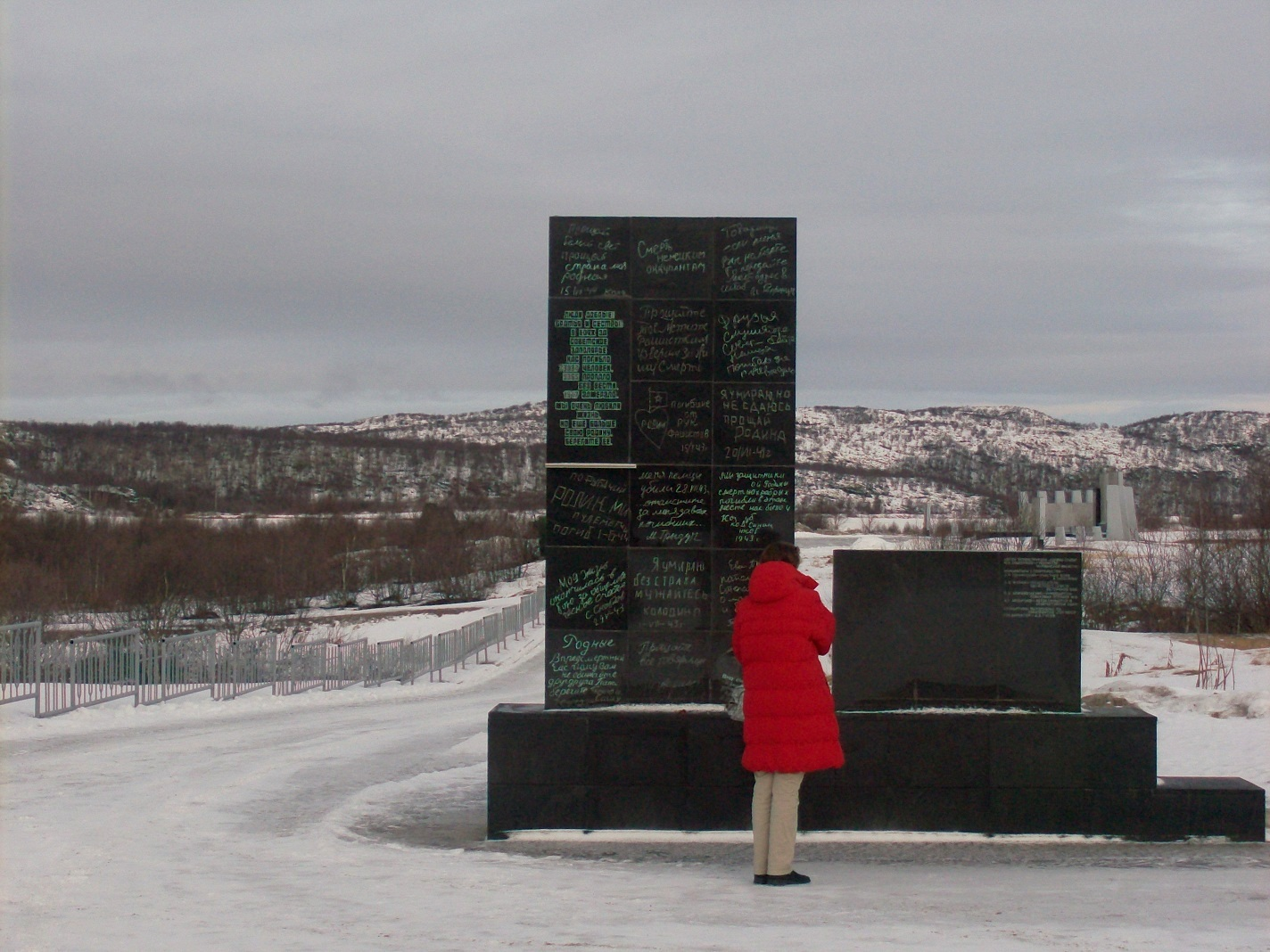
Memorial No. 1

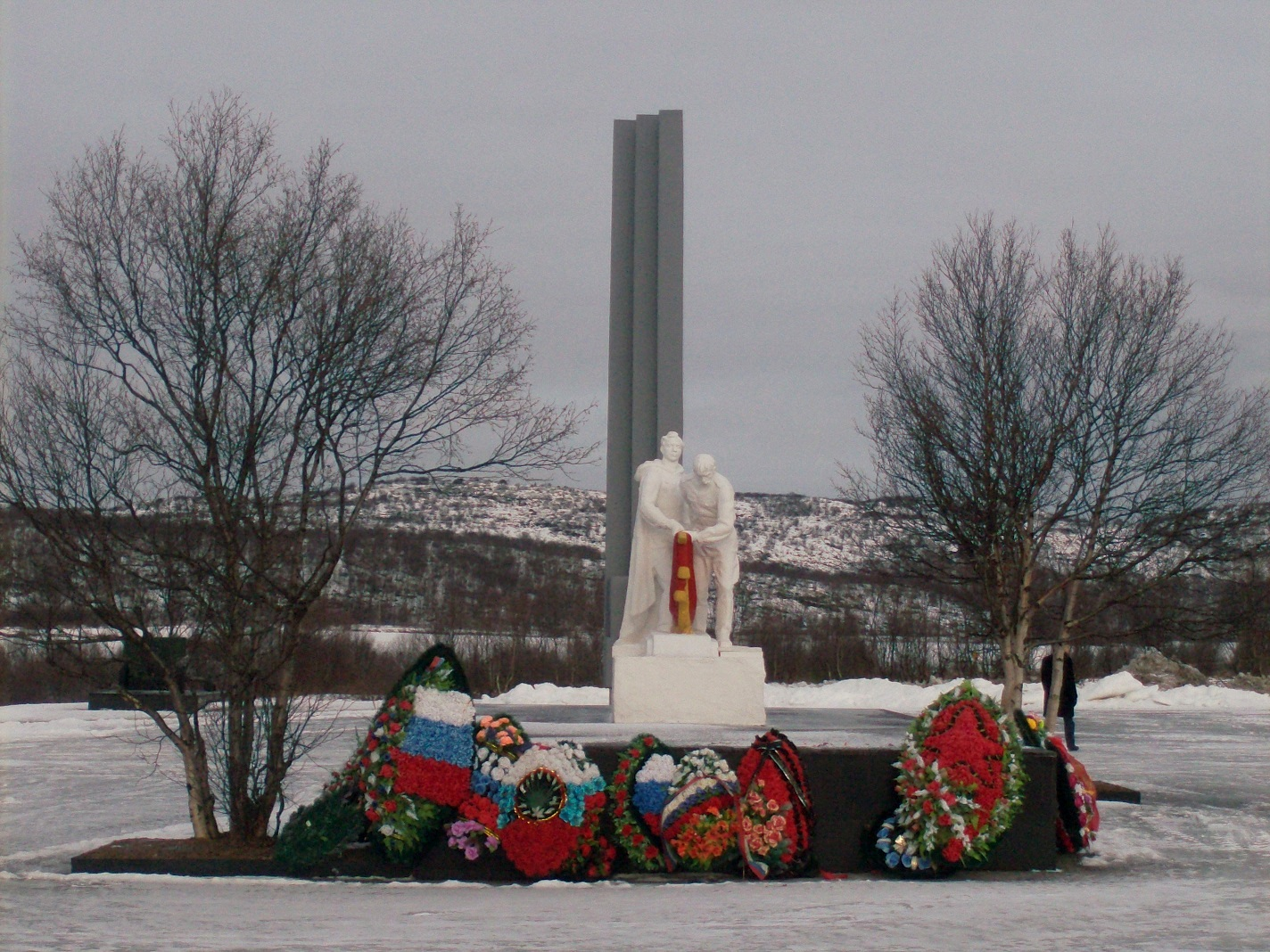
Memorial No. 2

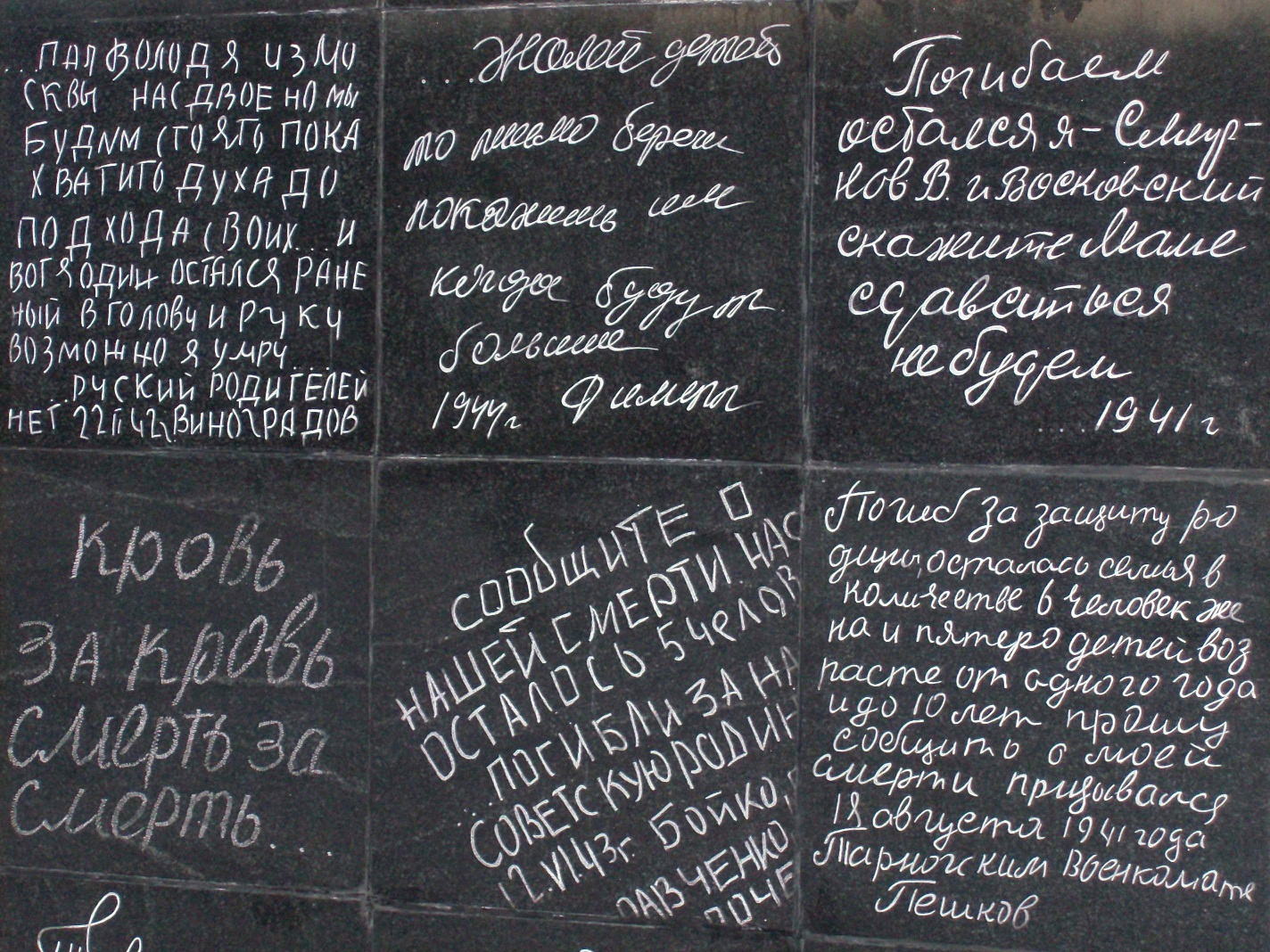
Messages by fallen soldiers

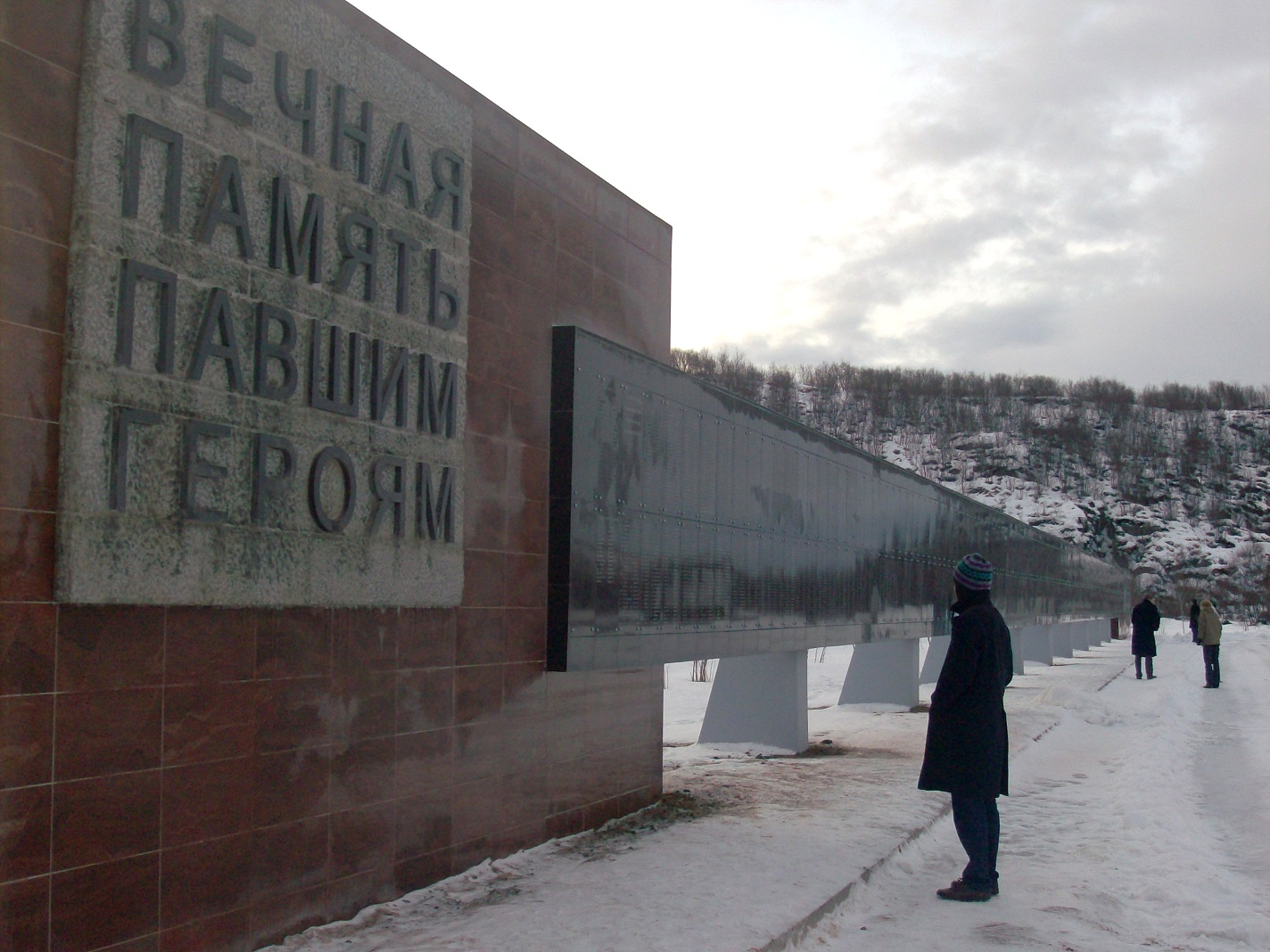
List of names of the fallen
