= Titovka (river) =

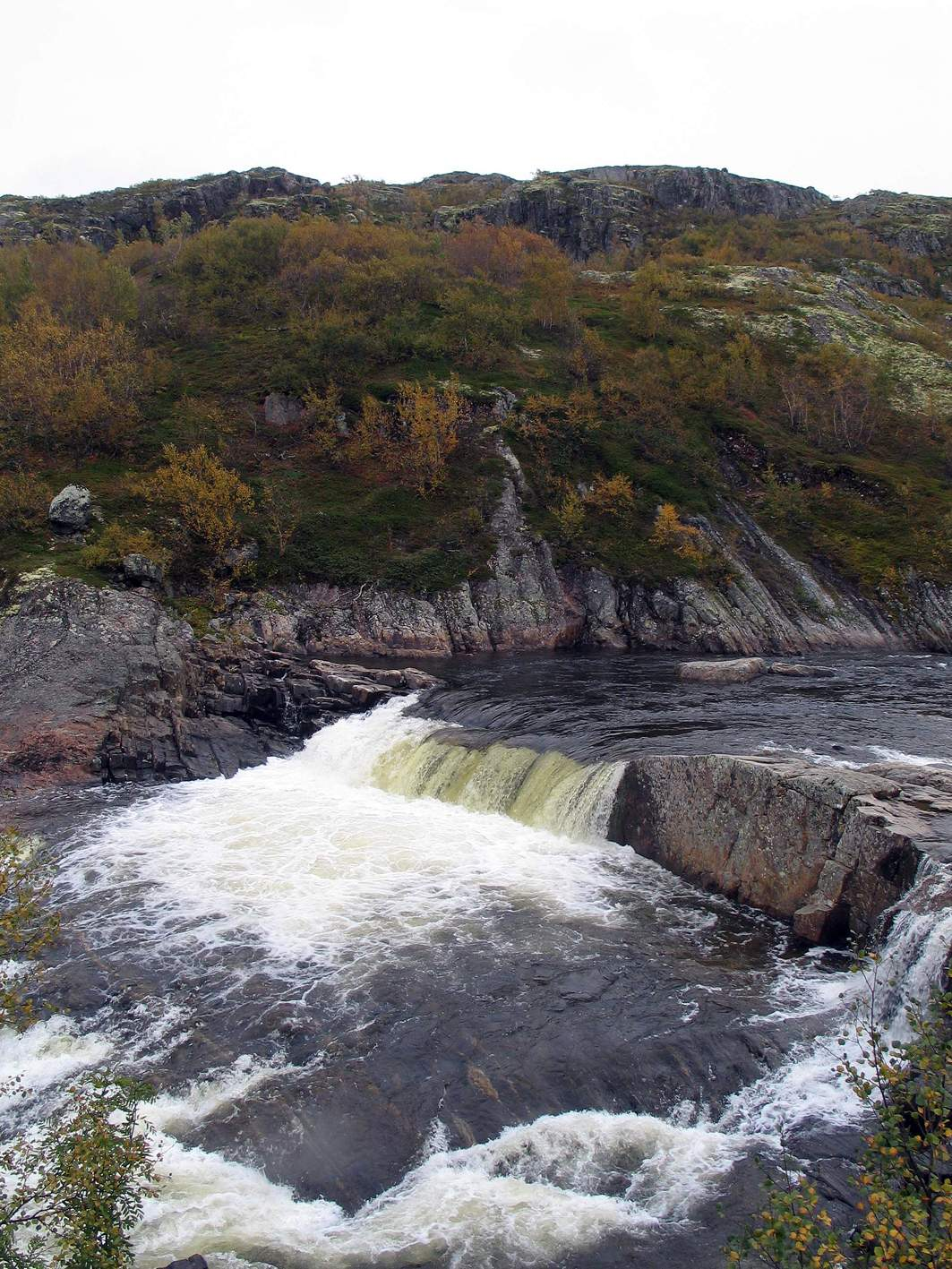

Location
- Country: Russia

Physical characteristics
- Mouth: Motovsky Gulf (Barents Sea)
  - coordinates: 69.5586°N 32.0182°E
- Length: 83 km (52 mi)
- Basin size: 1,320 km^{2} (510 sq mi)

The Titovka (Russian: Титовка, Finnish: Vaalesjoki) is a river in the north of the Kola Peninsula in Murmansk Oblast, Russia. It is 83 kilometres (52 mi) long, and has a drainage basin of 1,320 square kilometres (510 sq mi). The Titovka originates in the lake Koshkayavr and flows into the Motovsky Gulf of Barents Sea. Its biggest tributary is the Valasyoki.
