= Lapland Gold Rush =

1870s gold rush in Lapland, Finland

Coordinates: 68.50604°N 26.680836°E

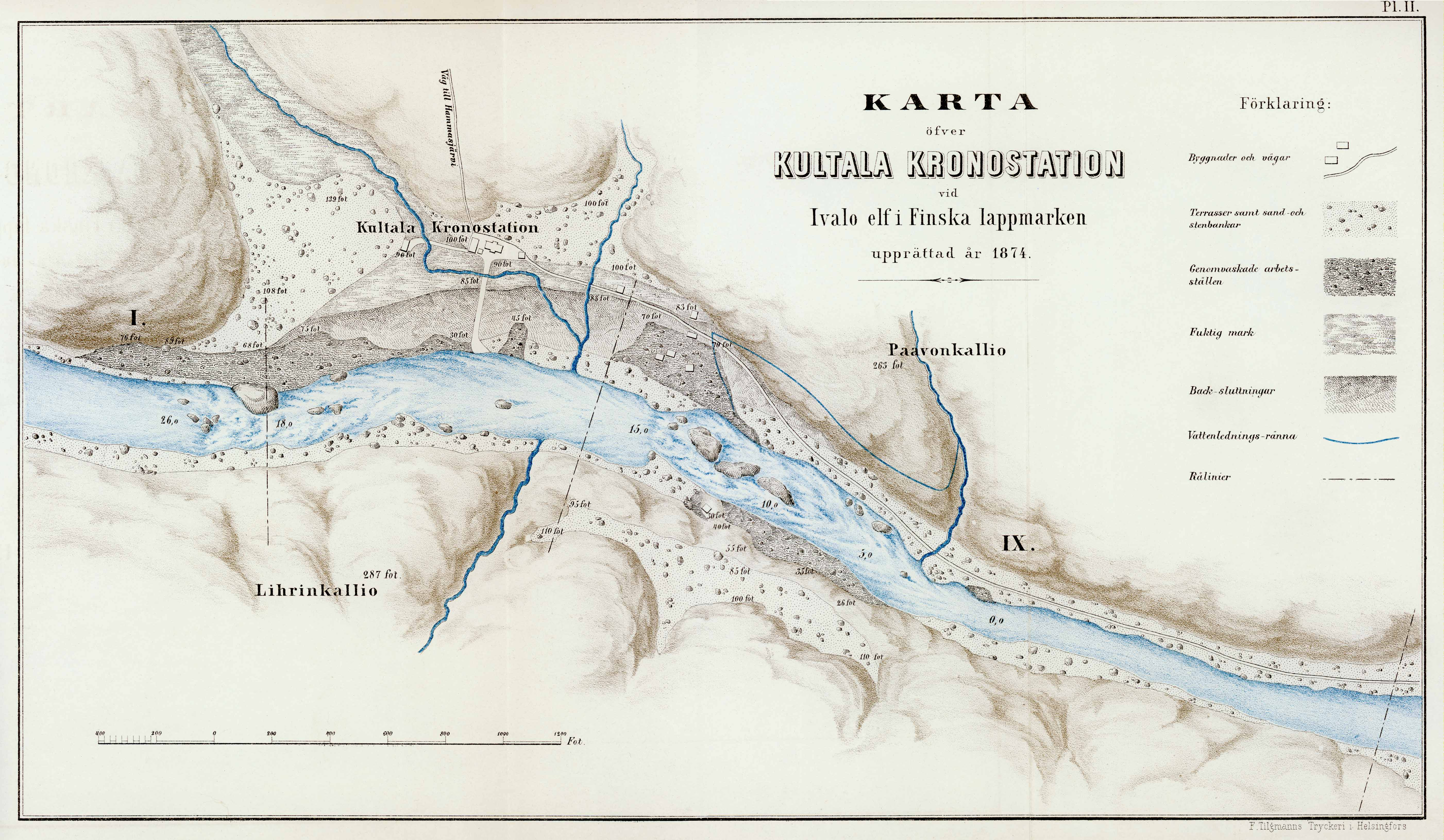
Map of the Kultala town by the Ivalo River in Inari, Finland, from 1874.

The Lapland Gold Rush, also known as the Ivalo Gold Rush, was a gold rush that occurred in the 1870s in Lapland, Grand Duchy of Finland, then part of Imperial Russia. The Lapland gold rush started in the valley of the Ivalojoki River in 1870 and lasted for a few years. Although the scale of the Lapland gold rush is not comparable to the major 19th century gold rushes, the Lapland gold rush has great local significance in Lapland and across Finland.

== Background ==
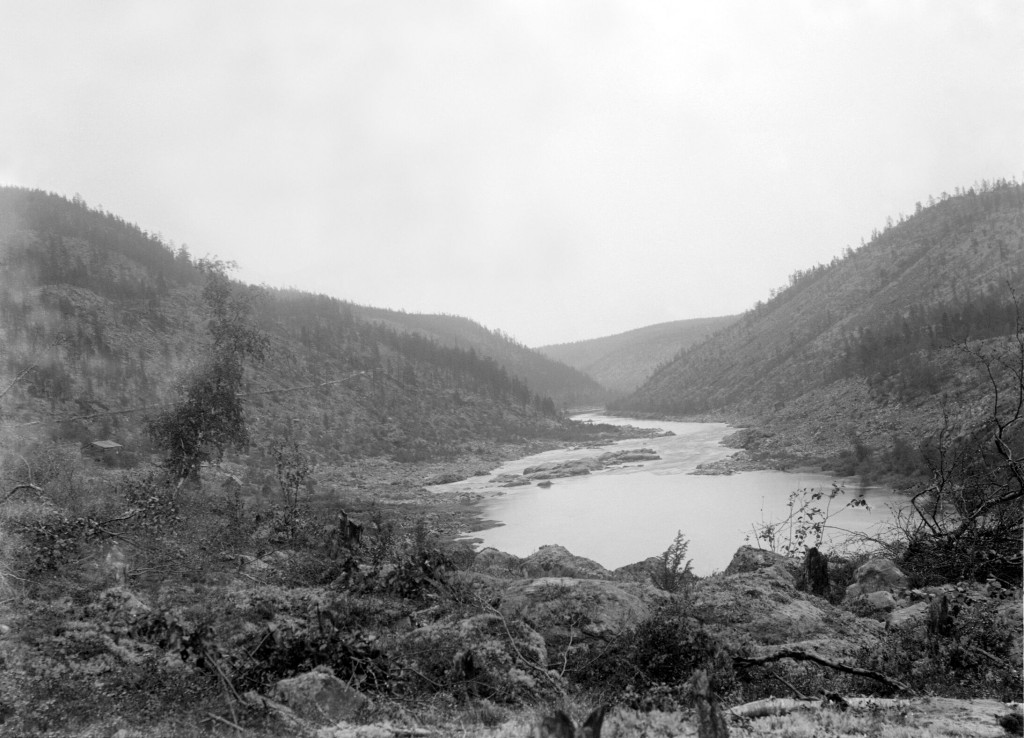
Ivalo River in the late 1890s

The first references to gold in the Finnish Lapland date back to the early 16th century, when gold was discovered from Utsjoki, but its presence was not widely known until the 19th century. In the 1860s, Norwegian geologist Tellef Dahll was conducting a geological survey in Finnmark county, located in the extreme northeastern part of Norway, when he discovered gold in the Tana river. Dahll found that the most promising sites were on the Finnish side of the river and contacted the authorities in Helsinki. In 1868, the Finnish Mining Board sent an expedition to Lapland in search of gold. Finland, which at the time was an autonomous part of Russia, was suffering from a major famine, and the Finnish local government hoped that the gold would benefit the country's deprived economy.

The expedition was led by the engineer Conrad Lihr, who later became the head of the Mint of Finland. After several months, Lihr and the expedition finally discovered gold in September 1868 from the Ivalo River in the municipality of Inari. The discovery was seen as so prosperous that the government decided to pass a new law regarding future gold mining in Lapland, which was approved by Alexander II in April 1870. The new law repealed the former act which had given the Emperor the privilege of all noble metals. Gold prospecting in Lapland was now free for every "decent" man of the Grand Duchy of Finland and the Russian Empire.

== The rush ==
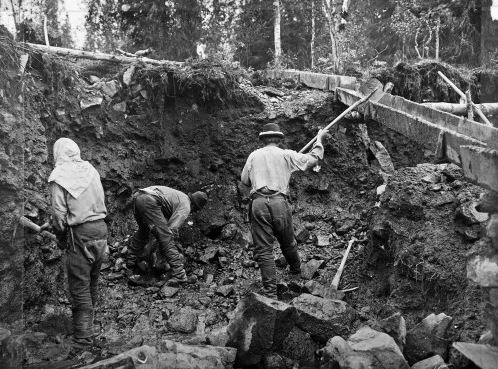
Gold mining by the Sotajoki river in 1898

The gold rush on the Ivalo River began in 1870, shortly after gold prospecting was made legal. During the spring and the summer, about 500 gold prospectors made their way through Lapland to the Ivalo River. The prospectors traveled hundreds of kilometers by ski, foot, or boat to the gold prospecting area, which was born to the confluence of Ivalo and its tributary Sotajoki. To regulate the rush, the government established a headquarters for the authorities and service point for the prospectors, called the "Kultala Crown Station." In Kultala, the officials issued licenses for prospectors and purchased their gold. There were also law enforcement officers and cartographers, as well as a restaurant and post office. At its largest, the number of government officials and gold prospectors was approximately 600 people. This was a significant community, as Lapland was mostly uninhabited wilderness, and the largest populated places contained only up to few hundred people.

Since the government fees and taxes were extremely high, only the 19 wealthiest prospectors were able to make claims and then employ the rest of the prospectors. The largest claims had 30–40 men, who worked for 11 hours per day, six days a week. The major claims produced some 10 kilograms of gold yearly, but the rush was over soon, as the gold started running out. In 1873, the government fees were cut in half and a year later a special law for the gold prospecting on the Tana River was passed. The Ivalo River area was almost abandoned in the early 1880s, and the few prospectors that were left moved to Sotajoki and to the Laanila village, located 10 kilometers east. In 1883–1884, the Kultala Crown Station was used by the professor Selim Lemström for exploring the northern lights, until it was closed in 1900. During the 1920s, two companies were practicing industrial gold mining, but both went bankrupt within a few years.

== Later gold prospecting ==
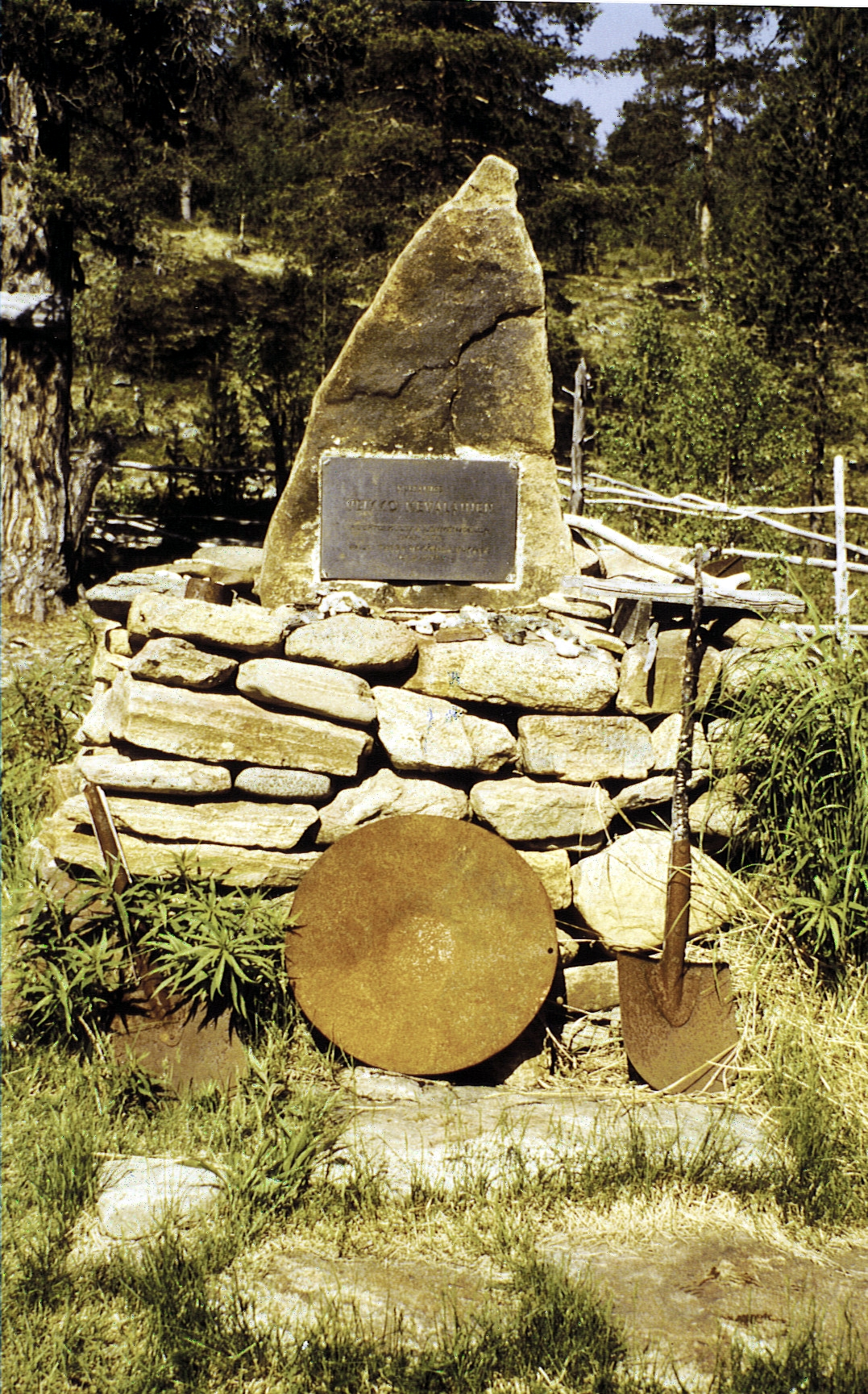
Memorial of The 1945 Lemmenjoki gold rush in Lemmenjoki National Park

Gold was also found in the Norwegian Lapland in the 1890s, but a rush never occurred.

In 1934, Sami people from the Purnumukka village found gold from Tankavaara in Sodankylä. The discovery attracted several Finnish prospectors, as well as the Swedish mining company Boliden AB and the German architect Werner Thiede from Hamburg. During World War II, Thiede served in the German Army in occupied Norway and returned to Tankavaara in 1944 as the Germans were building the Schutzwall defensive line across the northeastern Lapland. As the German troops retreated, they destroyed all the gold mining facilities in Tankavaara, except the ones built by Thiede. Since the 1970s, the Tankavaara area has served as a tourist attraction, including restaurants, hotels, and a gold prospecting museum.

Another minor rush in Lapland occurred in 1945 when gold was found in the Lemmenjoki river. Today there are still around 20 prospectors and 50 claims at the Lemmenjoki National Park, producing more than 20 kilograms of gold every year. The 2011 mining act prohibits all mechanical mining until 2021, but manual gold panning is still legal.

== In popular culture ==
The Lapland gold rushes have inspired several artists such as the novelist Arvo Ruonaniemi and the naivistic painter Andreas Alariesto. The most notable films are the 1951 classic comedy At the Rovaniemi Fair by Jorma Nortimo and the 1999 drama Gold Fever in Lapland which is based on the 1870 Ivalo gold rush.
