= Lähteenmäki =

Lähteenmäki is a Finnish surname.

== Geographical distribution ==
As of 2014, 96.6% of all known bearers of the surname Lähteenmäki were residents of Finland (frequency 1:1,649), 1.9% of Estonia (1:20,333) and 1.3% of Sweden (1:218,817).

In Finland, the frequency of the surname was higher than national average (1:1,649) in the following regions:

1. Satakunta (1:376)
2. Pirkanmaa (1:545)
3. Southwest Finland (1:1,033)
4. Tavastia Proper (1:1,071)
5. Central Finland (1:1,504)

== People ==
- Juho Lähteenmäki (born 2006), Finnish footballer
- Maija Lähteenmäki (born 1945), Finnish diplomat
- Maria Lähteenmäki (born 1957), Finnish historian
- Sami Lähteenmäki (born 1989), Finnish ice hockey player
- Krista Pärmäkoski (born 1990), Finnish cross country skier, née Lähteenmäki
