= Tankavaara =

Village in Sodankylä, Finland

Coordinates: 68°10′45″N 27°05′40″E

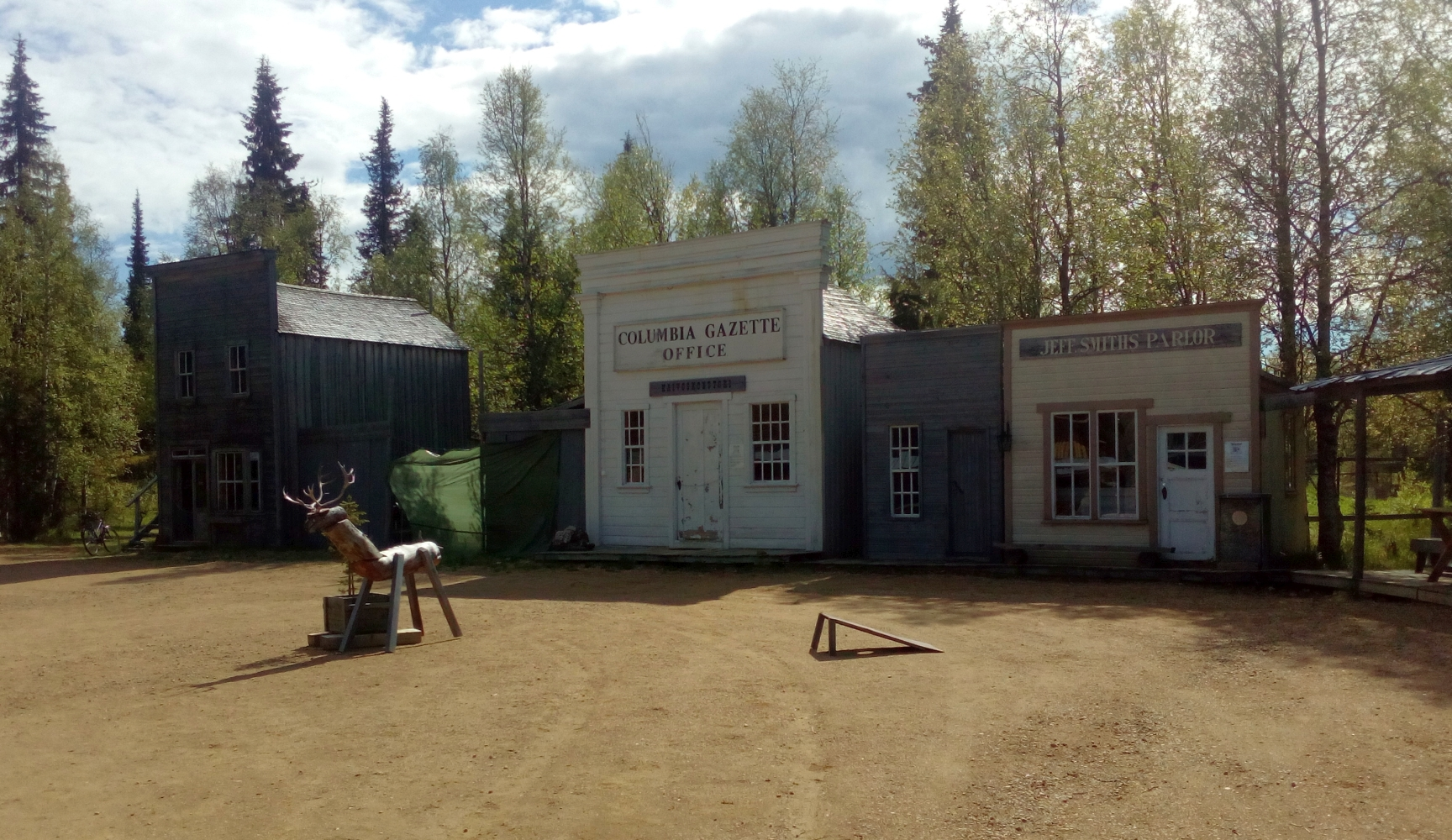
"Gold village" in Tankavaara have built reproductions of buildings of the gold rush towns.

Tankavaara is a village and a tourist attraction in the municipality of Sodankylä in Lapland, Finland. It is located by the E75 highway 90 kilometres (56 mi) north of Sodankylä and 30 kilometres (19 mi) south of the Saariselkä ski resort. Tankavaara is famous of its gold prospecting that started in the 1930s. Since the 1970s, the village has been a tourist attraction including hotel, restaurant "Old Gold Prospector" and the Gold Prospector Museum.

== History ==
The Tankavaara gold was found in 1934 by the Sami people of the nearby Purnumukka village. The discovery attracted several gold prospectors Finland as well as some foreign mining companies. Since 1950 the Tankavaara area was used for research work by the Geological Survey of Finland and the tourism finally started in 1970.

The Battle of Tankavaara was fought during the Lapland War in 26–31 October 1944 between the retreating German troops and the Finnish Army.

== The Gold Museum ==
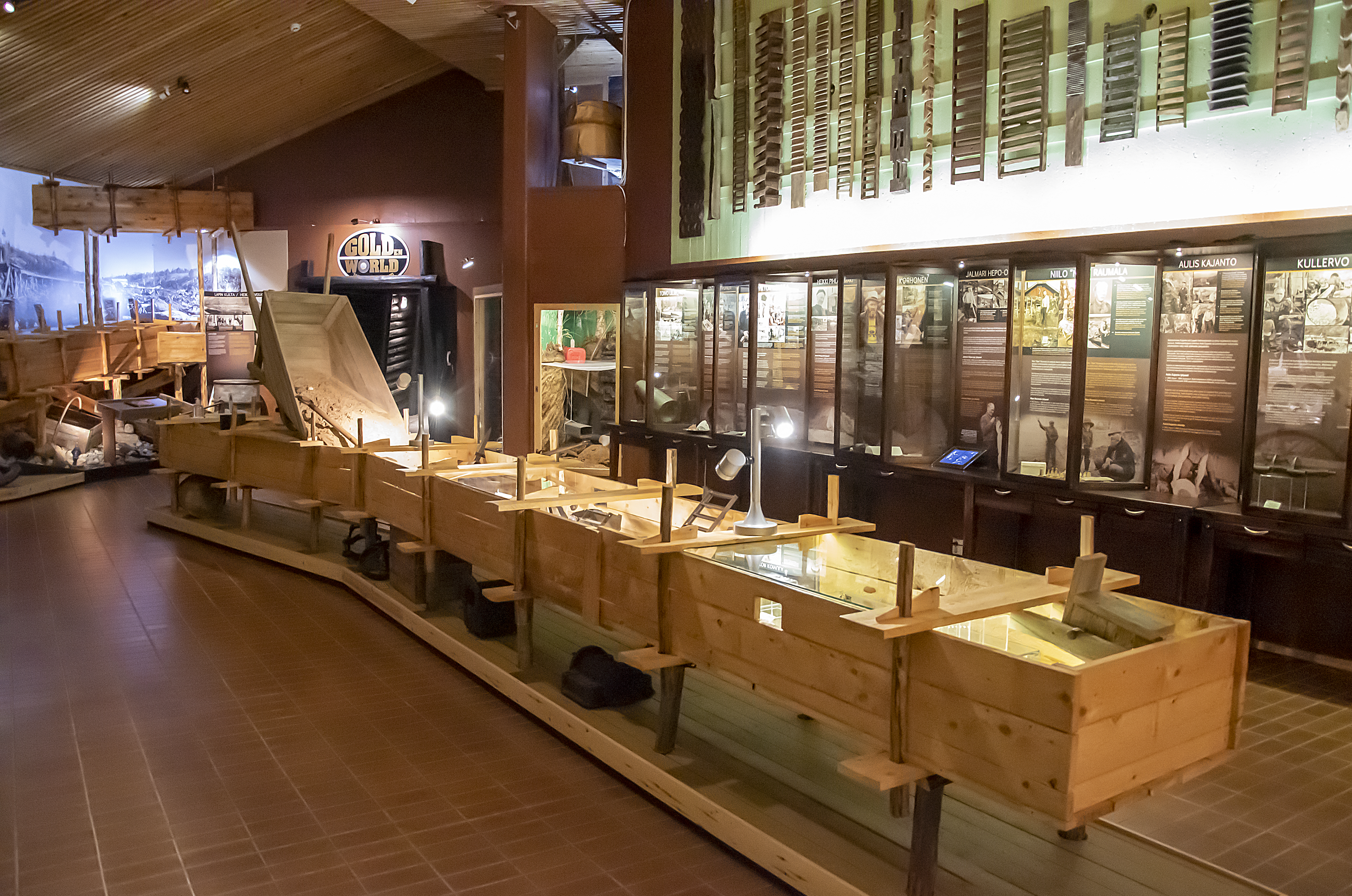
Interior of the Gold Museum.

The International Gold Museum presents the history of Finnish gold, as well as the history of the world's major gold rushes. A display called Golden world, tells the story of gold in more than 20 countries. The outdoor museum is housed within several historic buildings and the courtyard is decorated with a large bronze statue of a gold prospector, by the artist professor Ensio Seppänen. The museum's stone and mineral collection has more than 2500 samples on display from around the world.

== See also ==
- Lapland gold rush
