= Finnish national road 80 =

Road in Lapland region, Finland

Highway 80
- Kantatie 80 (Finnish); Stamväg 80 (Swedish)
- Kantatie 80, Stamväg 80
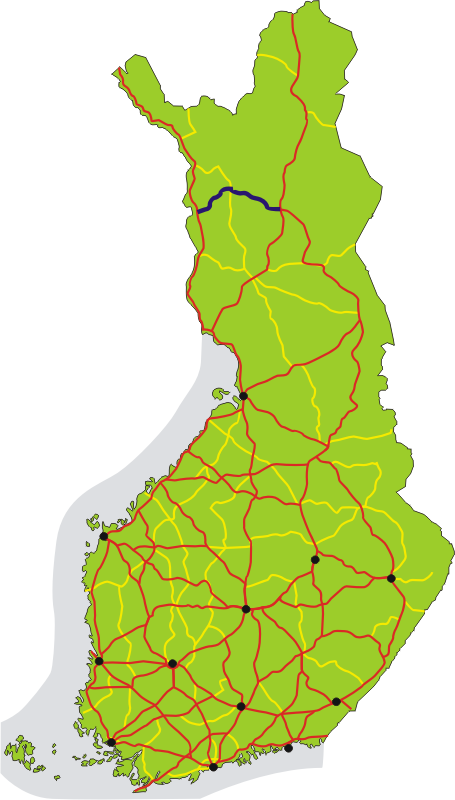

Route information
- Maintained by the Finnish Transport Agency
- Length: 155 km (96 mi)
- Existed: 1996–present

Major junctions
- From: Sodankylä
- To: Kolari

Location
- Country: Finland

Highway system
- Highways in Finland
← Kt 79	→ Kt 81

The Finnish national road 80 (Finnish: Kantatie 80; Swedish: Stamväg 80) is an east–west 2nd class main route in Lapland, Finland, which in the east starts from Sodankylä and continues west through Kittilä all the way to Kolari.

The length of the road is about 155 kilometres (96 mi), and it is the northernmost main road in Finland connecting the eastern and western parts of Lapland.

== History ==
In the 1938 numbering system, main road 80 was the road between Vikajärvi and Kemijärvi in Rovaniemi. The route between Sodankylä and Kittilä was built between 1945 and 1955 and was originally signed as regional road 953. In the 1996 renumbering, road 953 was changed to main road 80 while the original route of main road 80 became part of main road 82. In 2006, main road 80 was extended to Kolari, replacing regional road 939.

== Route ==
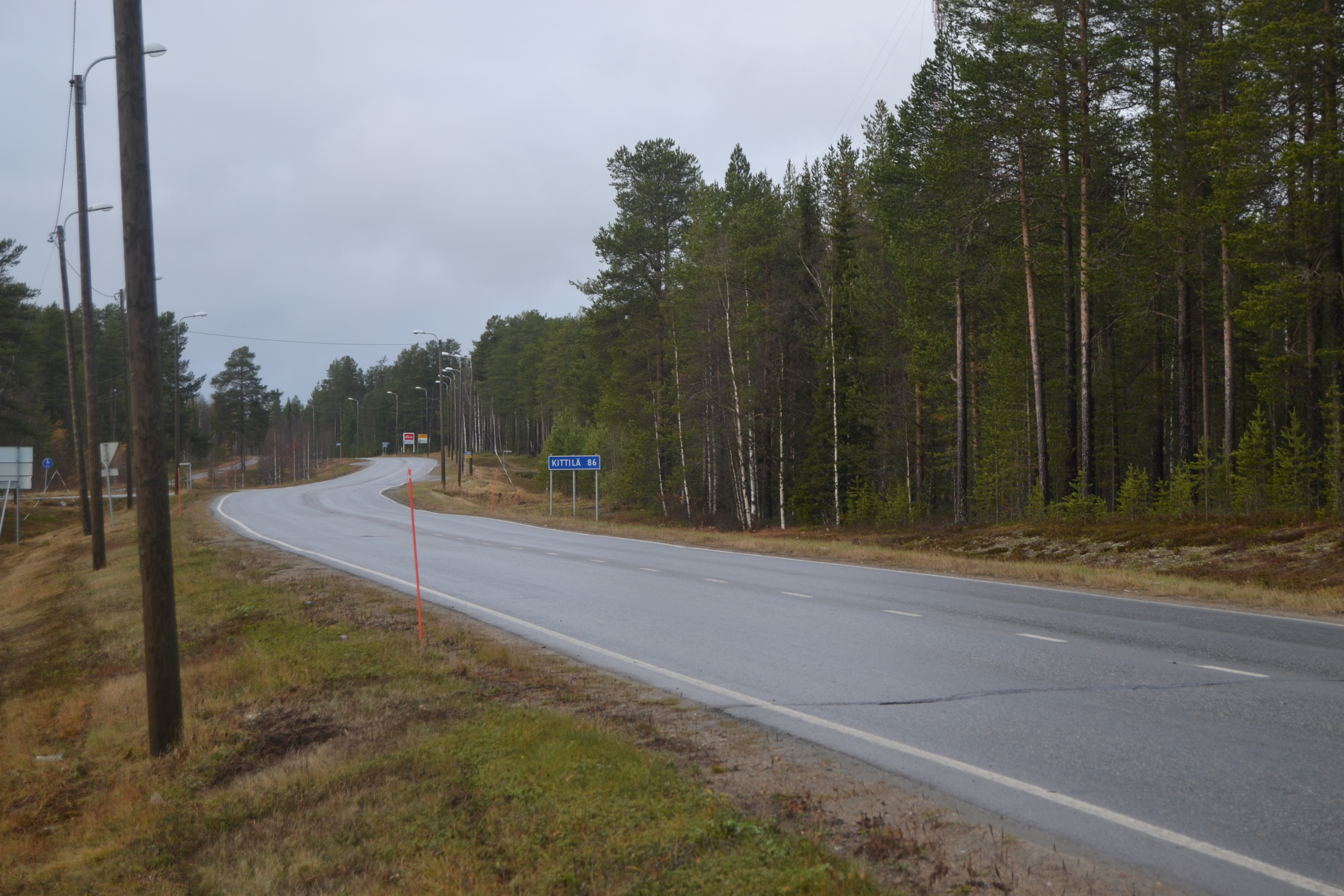
The Finnish national road 80 in Sodankylä towards Kittilä

The road passes through the following localities:

- Sodankylä (Sodankylä, Vaalajärvi, Mikkola and Jeesiö)
- Kittilä (Tepsa, Mustavaara, Hormakumpu, Kuusajoki, Kittilä and Yli-Kittilä)
- Kolari (Ylläsjärvi, Kurtakko, Kattilamaa and Kolari)

== See also ==
- Highways in Finland
