= Matti Tervaniemi =

Finnish farmer and politician (1859–1923)

Matti Tervaniemi (8 April 1859 – 7 January 1923; original surname Orajärvi) was a Finnish farmer and politician, born in Sodankylä. He was a member of the Diet of Finland from 1905 to 1906 and of the Parliament of Finland from 1907 to 1908, representing the Finnish Party.
