= Block-pillar church =

Wooden church in Finland and Sweden

The block-pillar church (Finnish: tukipilarikirkko; Swedish: blockpelarkyrka) was a common type of wooden church in Ostrobothnia in the 17th century. Individual specimens are also found elsewhere in Finland and in northern Sweden.

== Construction ==
The basic form of a block pillar church is a nave church, where the walls are made of horizontal logs and the joints between the logs are placed inside a timber pillar. The pillars are square timbered cavities as high as the walls with interlocking joints and are visible from both outside and inside the church. The pillars support a long timber wall so it doesn't start to buckle due to pressure from the roof. Inside the church, the walls are supported by tie beams between the parallel walls. Most commonly two pairs of block pillars were used, but the largest block-pillar church is Tornio Church, which has three pairs of pillars. In the west gable, the churches often have a timbered tower with a high spire. Most often the tower had no church bells, and a bell tower was built separately. Block-pillar churches appear to have been an Ostrobothnian specialty.

== Preserved churches ==
Around a hundred block-pillar churches were built, twelve of which have been preserved. The oldest preserved is Vörå Church from 1627, which was expanded into a cruciform church in 1777.

Place	Church	Built	Notes	Picture
Alastaro, Loimaa, Finland	Alastaro Church	1754	moved from Loimaa in 1841	Alastaro Church
Jukkasjärvi, Kiruna, Sweden	Jukkasjärvi Church	1726		Jukkasjärvi Church
Kempele, Finland	Kempele Old Church	1688–1691		Kempele Old Church
Kristinestad, Finland	Ulrika Eleonora Church, Kristinestad	1700		Ulrika Eleonora Church
Muhos, Finland	Muhos Church	1634		Muhos Church
Sodankylä, Finland	Sodankylä Old Church	1689		Sodankylä Old Church
Temmes, Tyrnävä, Finland	Temmes Church	1767		Temmes Church
Tervola, Finland	Tervola Old Church	1687–89		Tervola Old Church
Tornio, Finland	Tornio Church	1684–86		Tornio Church
Ullava, Kokkola, Finland	Ullava Church	1783		Ullava Church
Utajärvi, Finland	Utajärvi Church	1762		Utajärvi Church
Vörå, Finland	Vörå Church	1626–27	expanded to cruciform church in 1777	Vörå Church
