= Sodankylä Old Church =

- Lapp Church
- Finnish: Sodankylän vanha kirkko Northern Sami: Soađegili boares girku
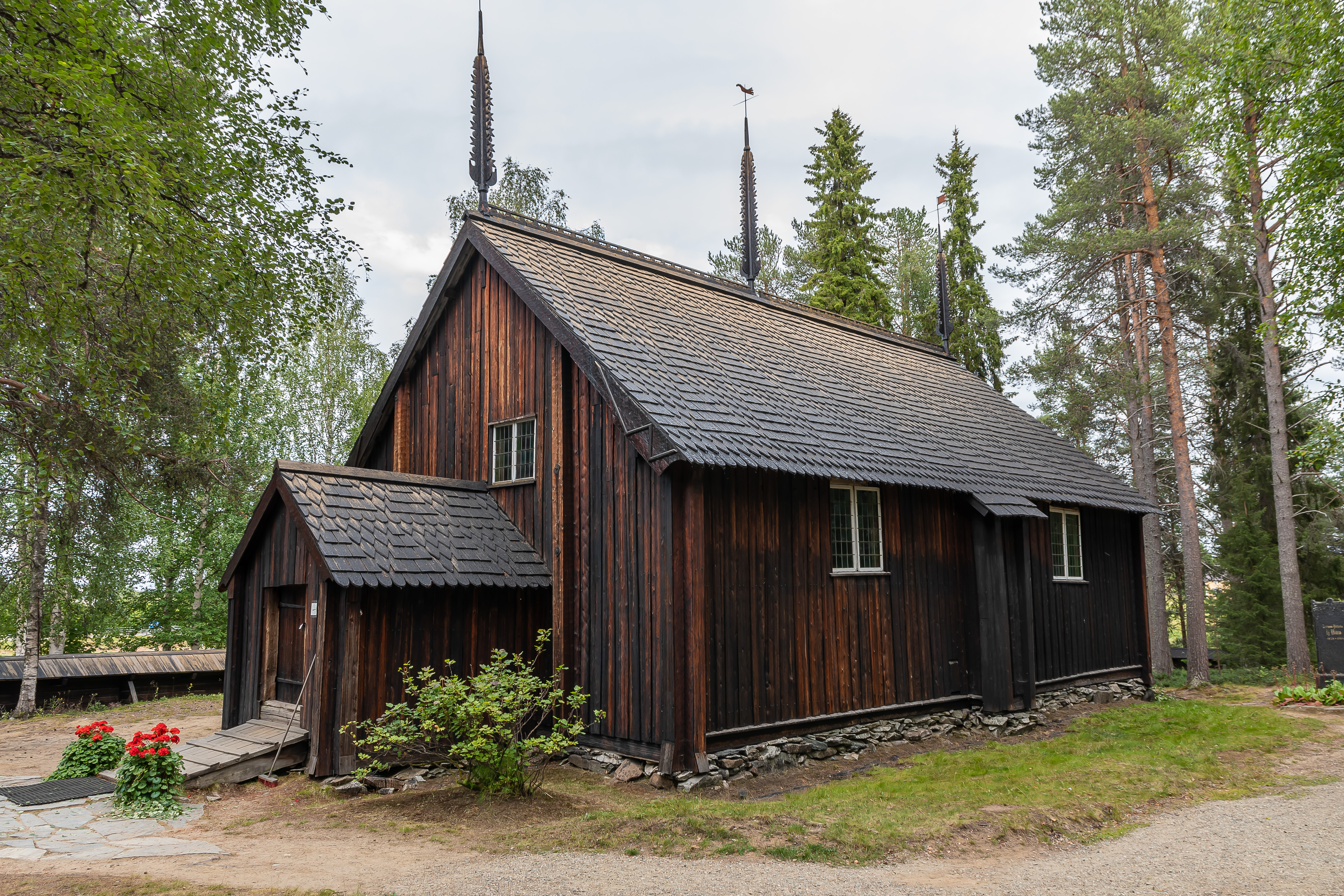
- Sodankylä Old Church
- 67°24′52.5″N 26°35′48.5″E
- Location: Sodankylä, Lapland
- Country: Finland
- Denomination: Evangelical Lutheran Church of Finland
- Website: www.sodankylanseurakunta.fi/kirkot-ja-tilat/kirkot-ja-kappelit/vanha-kirkko

Architecture
- Architectural type: Block-pillar church
- Completed: 1689; 337 years ago

Specifications
- Capacity: c. 200

Administration
- Diocese: Oulu
- Parish: Sodankylä

Sodankylä Old Church (also known as the Lapp Church; Finnish: Sodankylän vanha kirkko; Northern Sami: Soađegili boares girku) is a 17th-century wooden church located near the Kitinen River in the Sodankylä municipality in Lapland, Finland.

The church is one of the oldest preserved wooden churches in Finland. It is one of twelve surviving block-pillar churches in Finland and Sweden and has been described as the "best preserved in its original form in Finland". Both church and its yard area are classified by the Finnish Heritage Agency to the most nationally significant built cultural environments.

It has a capacity of about 200 and is used for weddings and smaller events.

== History ==
In 1687, before the start of church construction, the Sámi had granted a place called Skaitma, opposite the then village settlement of Sodankylä, as the location of the church. Construction work was started in the fall of 1688 at the earliest, with King Charles XI of Sweden paying for the construction work. In the same year, Sodankylä was founded as a church village as part of the Lapland parish of Kemi. The building was finally completed in 1689. When Sodankylä officially became an independent parish in 1747, the former chapel become the mother church of an exceptionally large area.

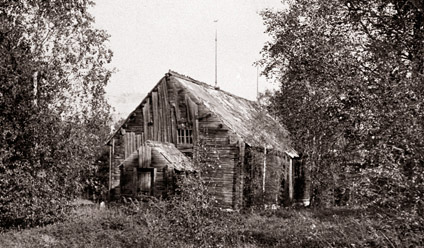
Condition classification of the old church before restoration in the 1920s

The old church fell out of use in 1859 after the new Sodankylä Church was completed. The church slowly began to fall into disrepair, until in the late 19th century the historical value of the church was understood. The first restoration of the church was carried out in 1926. The church was renovated between 1979 and 1980 and again between 1992 and 1995 by the Finnish Heritage Agency.

Dignitaries such as vicars were buried under the wood floor of the church according to the custom prevailing in the 18th century. The dead are still resting under the floorboards. A two-week-old baby boy of vicar Abraham Cajaner is preserved to this day by mummification, resting next to his two parents.

== Structure ==
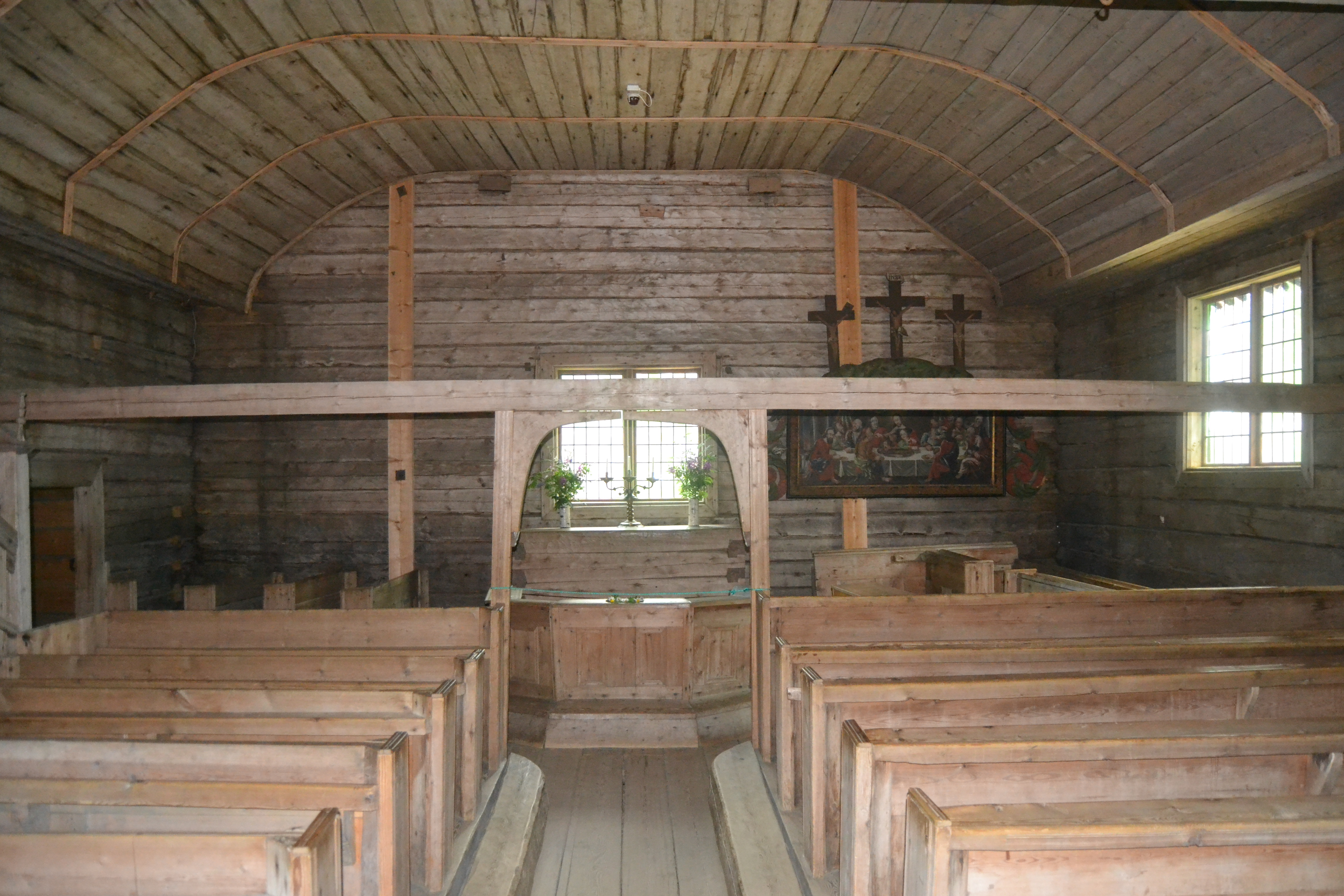
Interior of the old church

Stylistically, the church represents the form tradition of Ostrobothnian wooden churches. The church has a gabled roof and no tower. The sacristy is connected to the north wall of the church as a cantilever, as is the vestibule to the west end. The interior is unlined and unpainted. The walls are reinforced with Ostrobothnian type block pillars. Interesting details are the roof ridge and pinnacles of the roof, which represent a layering of styles going back to the Middle Ages. The barrel vault in the interior dates from 1703, and the choir is separated from the rest of the church by a modest rail.

The church has a gabled roof, without a roof truss. This is the case in the main room itself, as well as in the vestibule and sacristy. In addition to the ridge beam, there are eight purlins in the main room, four on each side. In the vestibule and the sacristy there is only a ridge beam. All roofs have planking on the rafters. The planking is done transversely in the direction of the roof ridge. The current planking is from the 1992 repair, and it was made using the same working methods as the original, i.e. the boards were not sawn, but were split by hand.

== See also ==
- Sodankylä Church – another church from the 19th century

== Sources ==
- Kairamo, M. (2000). "The Restoration of Sodankylä Old Church 1992–1995". In Kelley, Stephen J.; Salenikovich, A. J.; Stern, E. G.; Loferski, J. R. (eds.). Wood Structures: A Global Forum on the Treatment, Conservation, and Repair of Cultural Heritage. American Society for Testing and Materials. ASTM International. pp. 131–152. ISBN 978-0-8031-2497-4.
- Maunu, Eero (1991). "Sodankylän Vanha kirkko" [Sodankylä Old Church]. Sodankylän ja Sompion kotiseutujulkaisu (in Finnish). Sodankylä-seura ry.
- Pettersson, Lars; Knapas, Marja Terttu; Riska, Tove (1984). Sodankylän kirkot [The churches of Sodankylä] (in Finnish). Ekenäs: Finnish Heritage Agency. ISBN 951-9074-89-9.
- Sinisalo, Antero; Lilius, Henrik (1962). Kauneimmat kirkkomme [Our most beautiful churches] (in Finnish). Jyväskylä: K. J. Gummerus.
- "Sodankylän uusi kirkko" [Sodankylä's new church]. Sodankylä – Seura 50 v. Kotiseutujulkaisu II (in Finnish). Sodankylä-seura ry. 1999.
- Söderholm, Stina; Söderholm, Lawe (2005). Lapin kirkot – Pohjoiskalotin kirkot [The churches of Lapland – the churches of Arctic Europe] (in Finnish). Vol. 2. Pello: Pohjan Väylä. ISBN 952-5271-36-6.
- Yli-Tepsa, Matti (1999). "Santeri Ivalo" [Santeri Ivalo (Finnish writer)]. Sodankylä – Seura 50 v. Kotiseutujulkaisu II (in Finnish). Sodankylä-seura ry.
