= Jukkasjärvi =

Jukkasjärvi (Swedish): Čohkkiras (Northern Sami); Jukkasjärvi (Finnish)
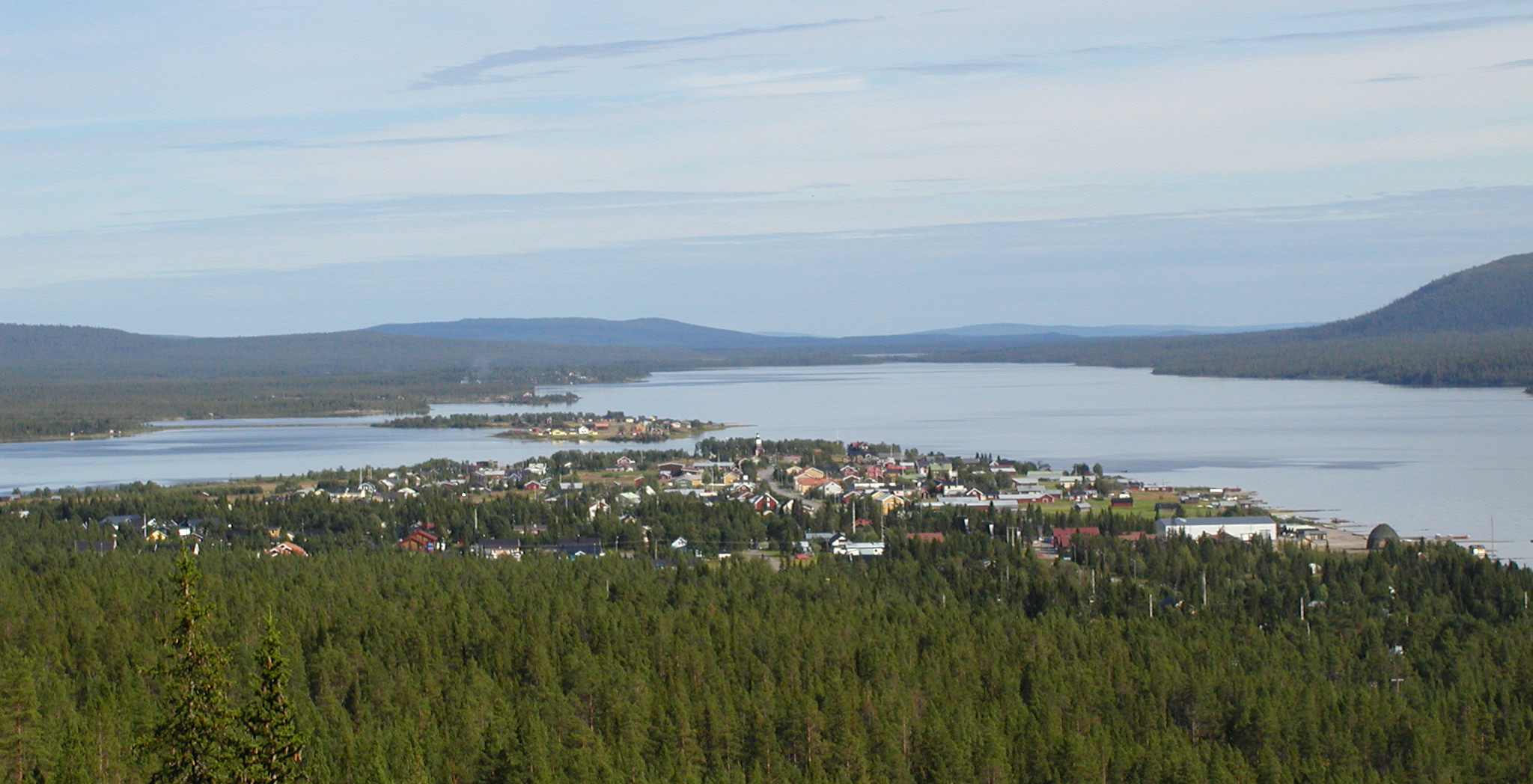
- July 2002 view over Jukkasjärvi

- Location within Norrbotten Location within Sweden
- Coordinates: 67°51′N 20°37′E
- Country: Sweden
- Province: Lapland
- County: Norrbotten County
- Municipality: Kiruna Municipality

Area
  - Total: 1.44 km^{2} (0.56 sq mi)

Population (31 December 2010)
  - Total: 548
  - Density: 379/km^{2} (980/sq mi)
- Time zone: UTC+1 (CET)
  - Summer (DST): UTC+2 (CEST)

Jukkasjärvi (Swedish pronunciation: [ˈjɵ̂kːasˌjærvɪ]; Sami: Čohkkiras) is a locality situated in Kiruna Municipality, Norrbotten County, Sweden with 548 inhabitants in 2010. It is situated at 321 meters elevation.

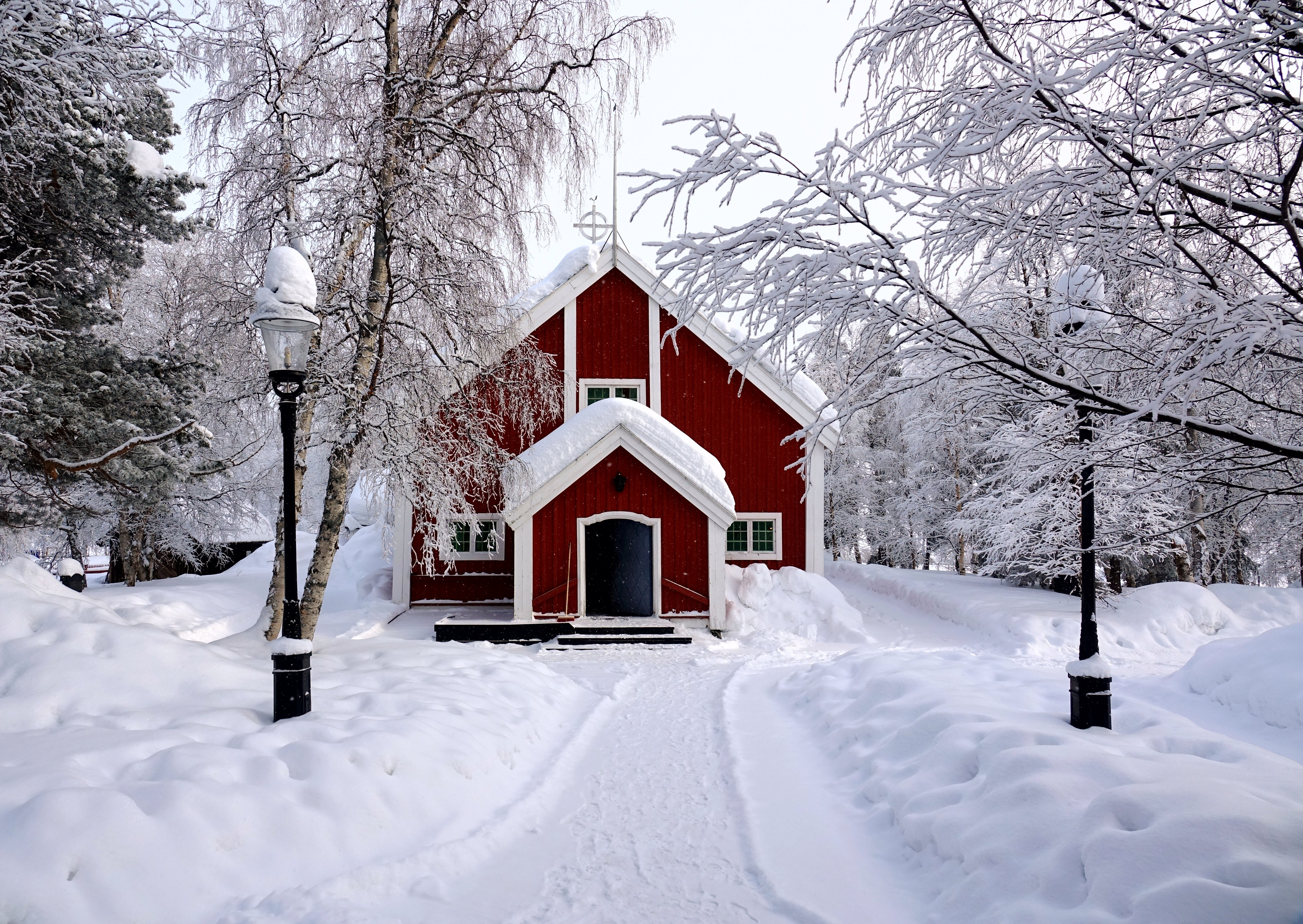
The Jukkasjärvi Church in March 2020.

The name is of Northern Sami origin, where Čohkkirasjávri means lake of assembly, as the area by the lake by which the village was founded was a Sami marketplace. The village got its first Finnish-speaking resident settlers in the 17th century, who changed the name into the more Finnish-sounding Jukkasjärvi, thereby removing its meaning, although järvi (jávri in Sami) still means lake in Finnish. This was also the name used by Swedish officials.

The village is a popular tourist accommodation during the winter months, from December until April, and is best known for its annual ice hotel, a hotel literally made from ice.

The wooden church is the oldest building in the village (built around 1607/1608) and is well known for its wooden carved altar piece triptych by Bror Hjorth. It is the only surviving example of a block-pillar church in Sweden.

== See also ==
- Dislocation of Sámi people from Jukkasjärvi and Karesuando
- Thure Johannson, Olympian and native of Jukkasjarvi
