= Maria Lähteenmäki =

Finnish historian

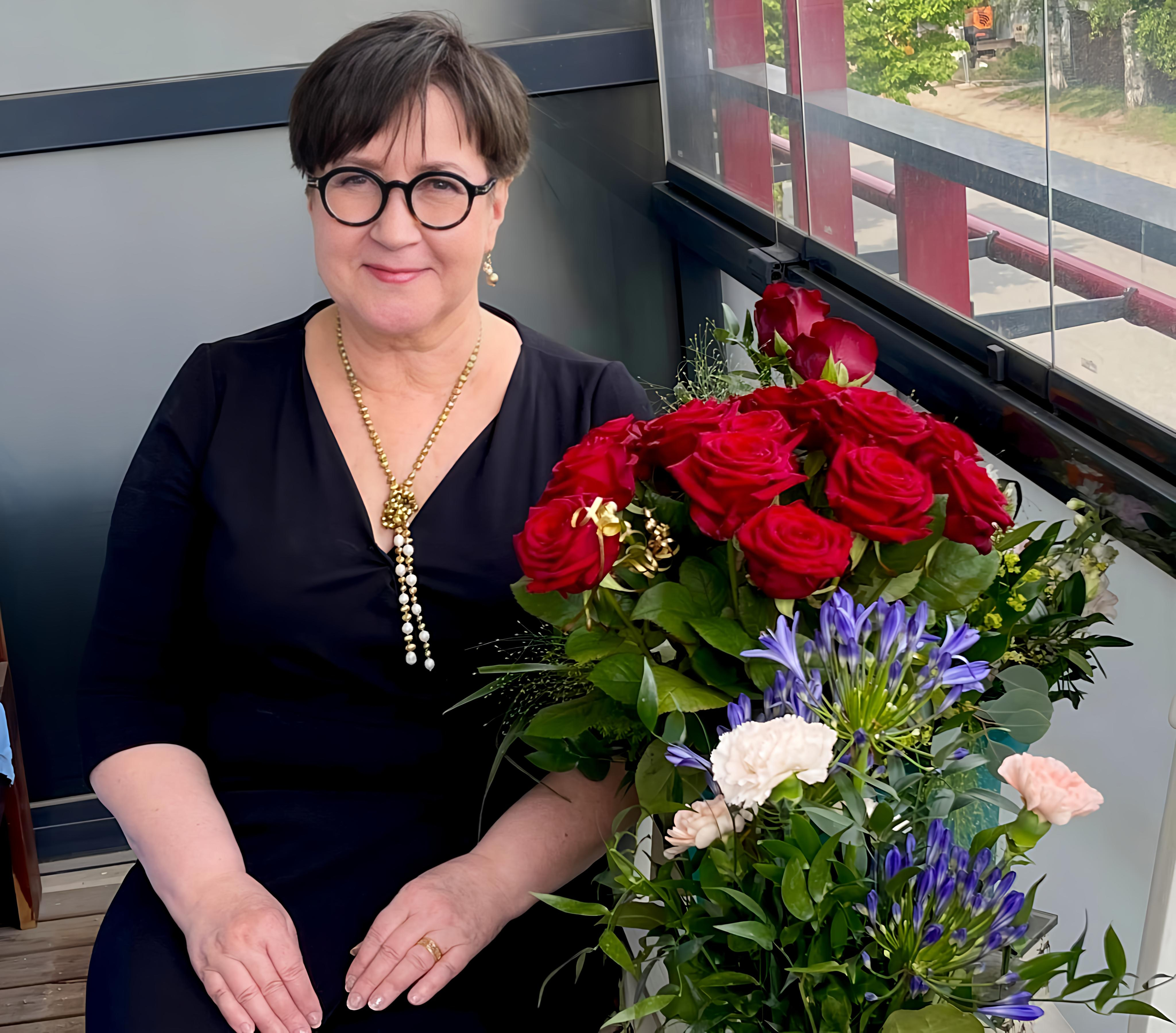
Professor Maria Lähteenmäki after her farewell lecture at Eastern Finland University, 2025.

Maria-Terttu Lähteenmäki (born 9 June 1957 in Sodankylä, née Kustula) is a Finnish researcher of history, Jutikkala Professor emerita at the University of Eastern Finland and Docent of Finnish and Scandinavian history at the University of Helsinki. She has produced many scientific monographs and textbooks and written a great number of articles.

== Career ==
In her research Lähteenmäki has specialized into the transnational regions (Lapland, the North Calotte, the Barents Euro-Arctic Region, North of Europe), 19th and 20th century's society history, history of women and social history of war. With her research Jänkäjääkäreitä ja parakkipiikoja: Lappilaisten sotakokemuksia 1939–45 (1999) Lähteenmäki earned the award of the Väinö Tanner Foundation (2000), as well as the President Urho Kekkonen's 70th Anniversary Fund's prize from her research Kalotin kansaa: Rajankäynnit ja vuorovaikutus Pohjoiskalotilla 1808–1889 (2004). The monograph was published also in English under the title The Peoples of Lapland: Boundary Demarcations and Interaction in the North Calotte from 1808 to 1889. It was published in the Series of the Finnish Science Academy (2006).

Lähteenmäki's latest monograph Maailmojen rajalla: Kannaksen rajamaa ja poliittiset murtumat 1911–1944 (2009) deals with Finland's and Russia's/Soviet Union's vulnerable border area Terijoki in the Karelian Isthmus from historical perspective. Lähteenmäki has caused a lot of debates with her daring interpretations. For example, when writing about the Lapland War Lähteenmäki notes that Finnish military leaders agreed to surrender Lapland lightly to German warzone without giving a thought for fact that civilians were left to dangerous border areas. From the basis of her Terijoki-research Lähteenmäki argues that memories of the lost Finnish Karelia are mainly based on childhood memories and have resulted in corrupted and one-sided picture from Karelia. Lähteenmäki has highlighted in different connections that Finland has been built from borders and that is why research of ordinary people living in border areas is important for national history research beside the research of elites and centers.

Lähteenmäki graduated as baccalaureate from Sodankylä upper secondary school (1977) and studied at the University of Helsinki, Finnish history as her primary subject. Her dissertation concerns the history of women: Mahdollisuuksien aika: Työläisnaiset ja yhteiskunnan muutos 1910–30-luvun Suomessa. Lähteenmäki received docentship of Finnish and Scandinavian history in 1999. She worked as an assistant and lecturer of history in 1991–2001, and as professor in 2003 and 2007 at the University of Helsinki as well as Senior Researcher in the Finnish Academy in 2001–2009. Lähteenmäki has been a Professor of Finnish history and Jutikkala Professor at the University of Eastern Finland from August 2009 till May 2025.

== Publications ==
- Alueiden Lappi. Edited by Maria Lähteenmäki. University publishing of Lapland. Rovaniemi 2006.
- Identiteetit liikkeessä. Suomalaisten kokemuksia Belgiasta. Edited by Maria Lähteenmäki & Minna Aalto. Siirtolaisuusinstituutti. Turku 2007.
- Jänkäjääkäreitä ja parakkipiikoja 1999. E-book: http://helda.helsinki.fi/handle/10138/16047
- Kansainvälinen naistenpäivä 1910–1990. Marjaliisa Hentilä & Maria Lähteenmäki. E-book: http://helda.helsinki.fi/handle/10138/14104
- Koteja vanhuksille. Ikäihmisten asuminen ja hoiva hyvinvointiyhteiskunnan haasteena. Vanhus- ja lähimmäispalvelun liitto ry. Helsinki 2003.
- Maa, seutu, kulmakunta. Näkökulmia aluehistorialliseen tutkimukseen. Edited by Maria Lähteenmäki. SKS. Helsinki 2009.
- Naiset eduskunnassa. Irma Sulkunen & Maria Lähteenmäki & Aura Korppi-Tommola. Suomen eduskunta 100 vuotta. Part 4. Edita. Helsinki 2006.
- Passages Westward. Edited by Maria Lähteenmäki & Hanna Snellman. Studia Fennica. Ethnologica 9. SKS/FLS. Helsinki 2006.
- Pitkänsillan tuolla puolen... Puheenvuoroja työväenliikkeen historiasta, tilasta ja tulevaisuudesta. Edited by Maria Lähteenmäki & Anu Suoranta. Työväen Arkiston julkaisuja 5. Helsinki 2010.
- Tarja Halonen: Mahtinaisen malli. Teoksessa Suuret suomalaiset. Otava. Helsinki 2004, 66–79.
- Terra Ultima: A Short History of Finnish Lapland. Otava. Helsinki 2006.
- The Flexible Frontier: Change and Continuity in Finnish-Russian Relations. Edited by Maria Lähteenmäki. Aleksanteri Series 5/2007. Helsinki 2007.
- The North Calotte: Perspectives on the Histories and Cultures of Northernmost Europe. Edited by Maria Lähteenmäki & Päivi Maria Pihlaja. Publications of the Department of History 18. University of Helsinki. Puntsi. Inari 2005.
- Vuosisadan naisliike: Naiset ja sosialidemokratia 1900-luvun Suomessa. Sosialidemokraattiset Naiset. Helsinki 2000. E-book: http://hdl.handle.net/10138/16243
- Yksi kamari – kaksi sukupuolta: Suomen eduskunnan ensimmäiset naiset. Edited by Pirjo Markkola & Maria Lähteenmäki & Aleksandra Ramsay et alia. Eduskunnan kirjaston tutkimuksia ja selvityksiä 4. Helsinki 1997.

== Sources ==
- Maria.Lähteenmäki.Blog: http://marialahteenmakiblogi.blogspot.com
- Autio Veli-Matti, Suomen Historiallisen Seuran matrikkeli 1875–2007. SKS. Helsinki 2007, 124–125.
- Homepages of University of Helsinki: http://www.helsinki.fi/historia/henkilokunta/lahteenmaki.html
- Kinnunen Helena, Akatemiatutkija ja HS-toimittaja saivat UKK-palkinnot. Helsingin Sanomat 29.9.2005.
- Kuka kukin on. Otava. Helsinki 2009, 599.
- Lappalainen Tuomo, Oikea sota hävisi historiasta. Suomen Kuvalehti 13.8.1999, 24–27.
- Luukka Teemu, Ruohonjuuritason historioitsija. Helsingin Sanomat 9.10.2005.
- Lähteenmäki Maria, Kevyesti luovutettu Lappi. Pohjois-Suomen erikoisasema toisen maailmansodan aikana on purkamaton tabu. Vieraskynä. Helsingin Sanomat 29.3.1999.
- Lähteenmäki Maria, Kuva menetetystä Karjalasta on vinoutunut ja kuvitteellinen. Vieraskynä. Helsingin Sanomat 4.8.2009.
- Oksanen Emmi, Kipeä Karjala. Karjalainen 15.8.2009.
- Summa Markku, Muisti- ja tutkimustietoa yhdistämällä realistisempi kuva menetetystä Karjalasta. Karjala 13.8.2009.
- Finnish scientific academy's homepages, Toimintakertomus 2008: https://web.archive.org/web/20101122194124/http://www.acadsci.fi/toimintakertomus.htm
- Tasala Markku, Mainettaan yhtenäisempi kalotin kansa. Lapin Kansa 12.2.2005.
- Vakkuri Marjukka, Valtavirtaa vastaan. Lapin Kansa 29.10.2005.
