= Unari =

Village in Sodankylä, Finland

Coordinates: 67°08′35″N 25°43′45″E

Unari, which is also known as Unarin-Luusua, is a village in the south of Sodankylä on the border with Rovaniemi and on the southern shore of Lake Unari in Finland. Unari has 67 residents and is located approximately 70 km from downtown Sodankylä and approximately 90 km from Rovaniemi.
