= Sodankylä Airfield =

Airport in Lapland, Finland

Sodankylä Airfield Sodankylän lentokenttä
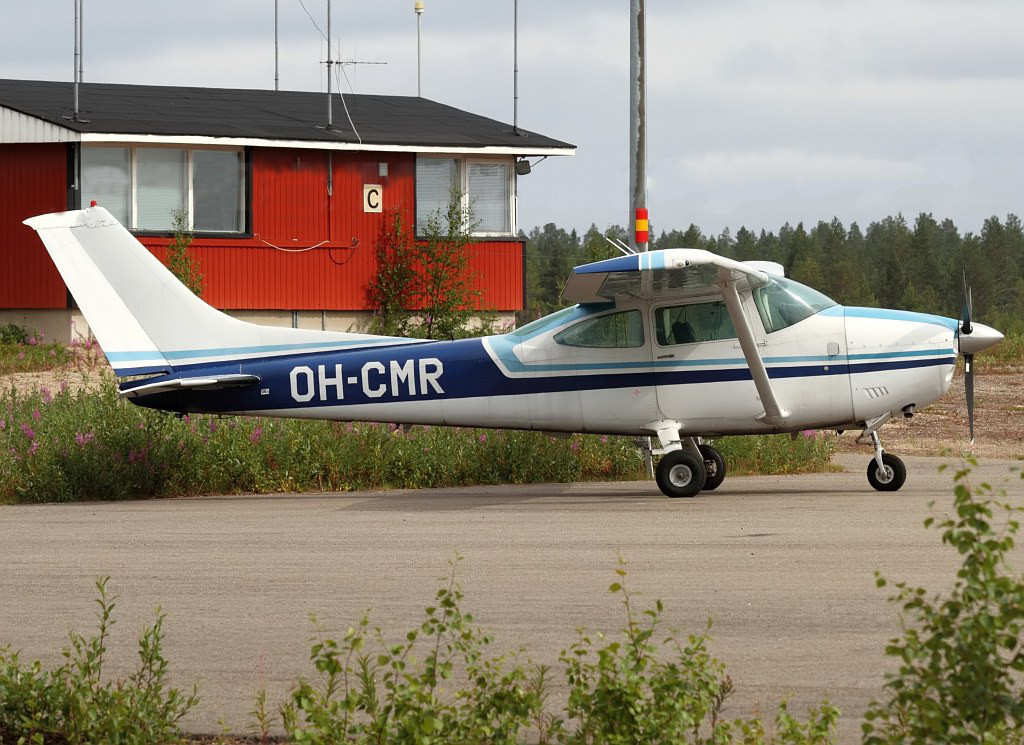
- A Cessna 182P aircraft at Sodankylä Airfield
- IATA: SOT; ICAO: EFSO

Summary
- Operator: Municipality of Sodankylä
- Location: Sodankylä, Finland
- Elevation AMSL: 602 ft / 183 m
- Coordinates: 67°23′48″N 026°37′05″E

Map
- Location within Finland

Runways
Direction	Length		Surface
Direction	m	ft	Surface
16/34	1,500	4,921	asphalt
- Source: VFR Finland

Sodankylä Airfield (Finnish: Sodankylän lentokenttä; IATA: SOT, ICAO: EFSO) is an airfield in Sodankylä, Lapland, Finland, located 3 kilometres (2 mi) south-east of Sodankylä municipal centre.

The airfield was originally built in the early 1940s, initially as a stopover airfield for the flights to Petsamo. A 1,100-metre (3,609 ft) gravel runway was built in 1971. The asphalt pavement and terminal building were completed in 1989, and there were scheduled flights in 1989–1996. There were some plans to build a new, longer runway to enable direct charter flights in the early 2000s. Sodankylä Airport was turned to an uncontrolled airfield on July 1, 2010. Today the airfield serves as a general aviation airfield.

== See also ==
- List of airports in Finland
