= Lasse Näsi =

Finnish politician (1930–2022)

Member of the Parliament of Finland
- In office 22 March 1991 – 23 March 1995

Mayor of Sodankylä
- In office 1968–1993

Personal details
- Born: Lasse Juhani Näsi; 12 October 1930 Karunki, Finland
- Died: 22 February 2022 (aged 91)
- Party: Centre Party

Lasse Juhani Näsi (12 October 1930 – 22 February 2022) was a Finnish politician. A member of the Centre Party, he served in the Parliament of Finland from 1991 to 1995. He died on 22 February 2022, at the age of 91.
