= Jeesiö =

- Village
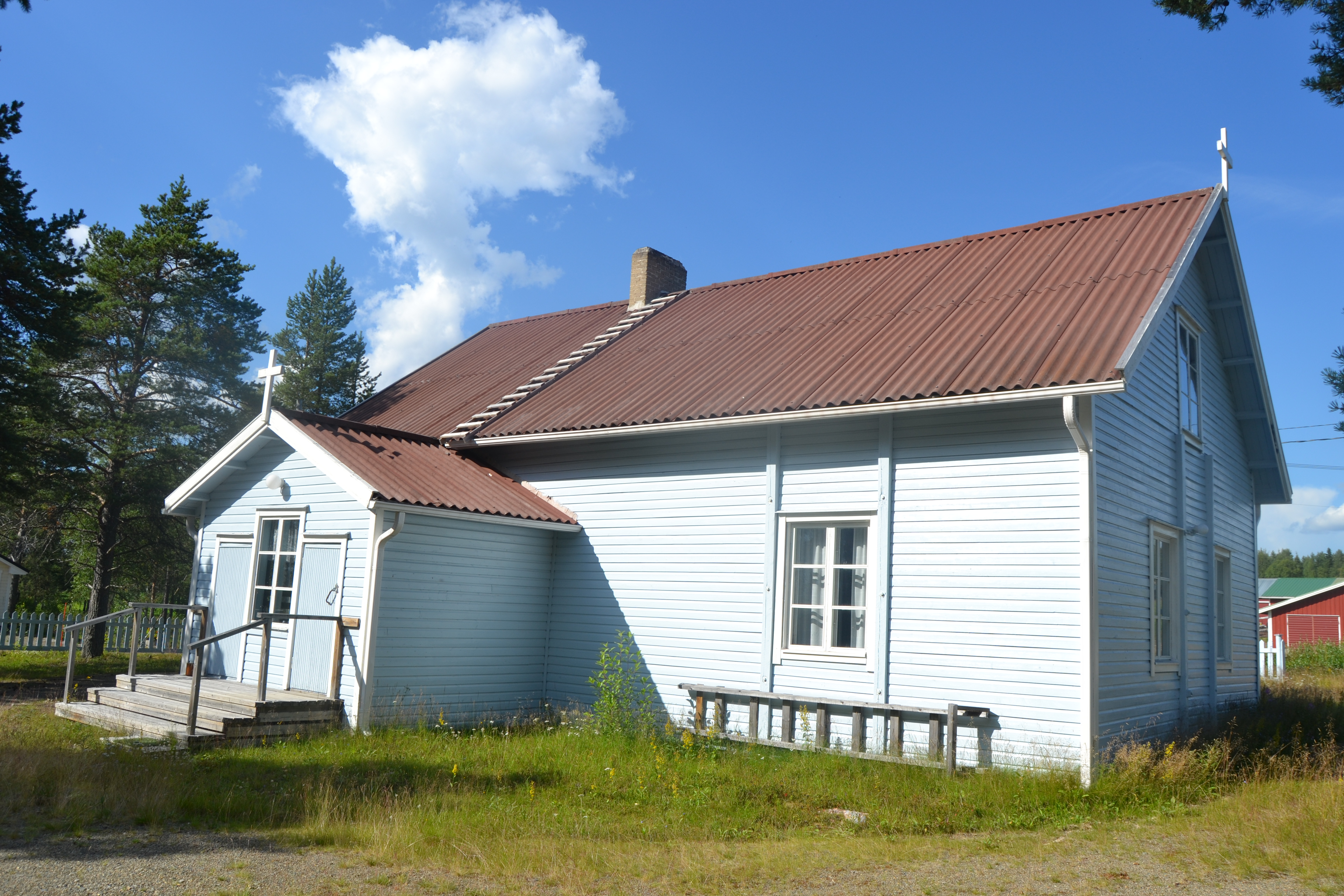
- A chapel in Jeesiö.

- Location in Finland
- Coordinates: 67°30.5575′N 26°02.2562′E
- Country: Finland
- Region: Lapland
- Municipality: Sodankylä
- Time zone: UTC+2 (EET)
  - Summer (DST): UTC+3 (EEST)
- Postal code: 99770

Jeesiö (Finnish pronunciation: [ˈjeːsiøˣ]) is a rural village in the Sodankylä municipality in Lapland, Finland. It is located along the Highway 80, about 30 kilometres (19 mi) west of the town centre towards Kittilä. About 130 residents live in the village's postal code area. There are still buildings left in the village from the early 20th century, as the village was not burned in the Lapland War by Germans, possibly due to poor transport connections.

The Kaarestunturi fell is located about 12 kilometres (7.5 mi) northeast of Jeesiö and a gravel road called Jeesiönratsutie leads there.

== See also ==
- Finnish national road 80

== Sources ==
=== Further reading ===
- Alajärvi, Paula (2014). Jeesiö : Virtamukasta Mikkolaan (in Finnish). Jeesiön kyläyhdistys. ISBN 978-952-93-4230-3.
