= Sodankylä Church =

- Finnish: Sodankylän kirkko Northern Sami: Soađegili girku
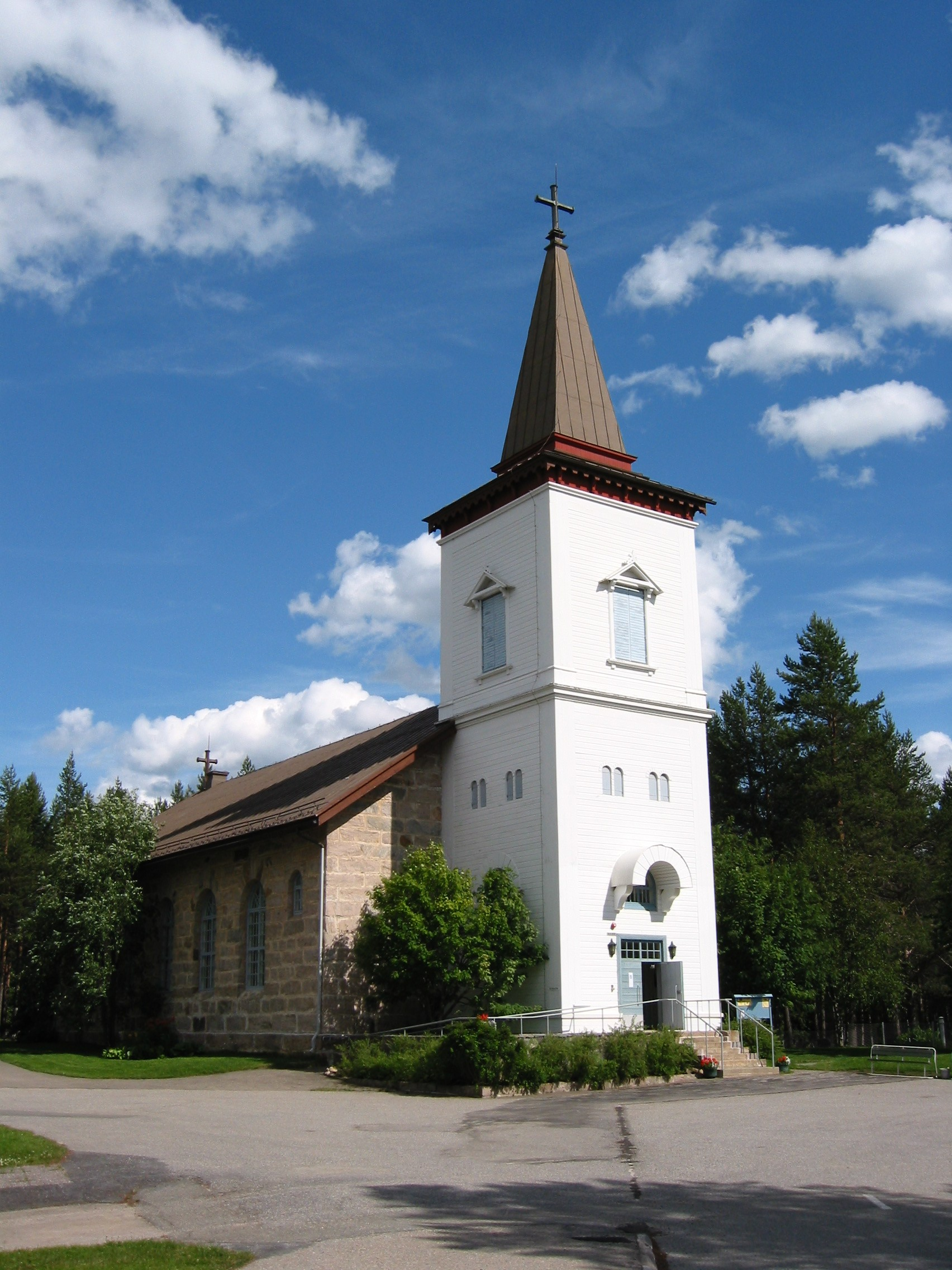
- Sodankylä Church
- 67°24′50″N 26°35′41″E
- Location: Sodankylä, Lapland
- Country: Finland
- Website: www.sodankylanseurakunta.fi/kirkot-ja-tilat/kirkot-ja-kappelit/uusi-kirkko

Architecture
- Architect: Ludvig Isak Lindqvist
- Completed: 27 October 1859; 166 years ago

Specifications
- Capacity: 420

Administration
- Diocese: Oulu
- Parish: Sodankylä

The Sodankylä Church (Finnish: Sodankylän kirkko; Northern Sami: Soađegili girku) is the 19th-century grey stone church located in the Sodankylä municipality in Lapland, Finland. The building was designed by Ludvig Isak Lindqvist, and it was completed in 1859. It is located about 100 meters from Sodankylä's old church, built in 1689.

== History ==
The new church in Sodankylä became necessary after the old one became too cramped and dilapidated. The goal was to build a church at least twice as big as the previous church. Funds for the construction of the church were obtained when Emperor Nicholas I of Russia approved the proposal made by the Senate of Finland on 25 February 1852. On 22 September 1856, Emperor Alexander II of Russia approved the drawings drawn up by architect Lindqvist, revised in the Finnish Intendant's office, in which the Intendant Ernst Lohrmann had proposed a taller and entirely wooden tower, otherwise stone quarried from the locality has been used in the church. Because of the building material, decorative masonry was left out, and the church became unadornedly simple.

== See also ==
- Sodankylä Old Church
