= Tellef Dahll =

Norwegian mineralogist and geologist

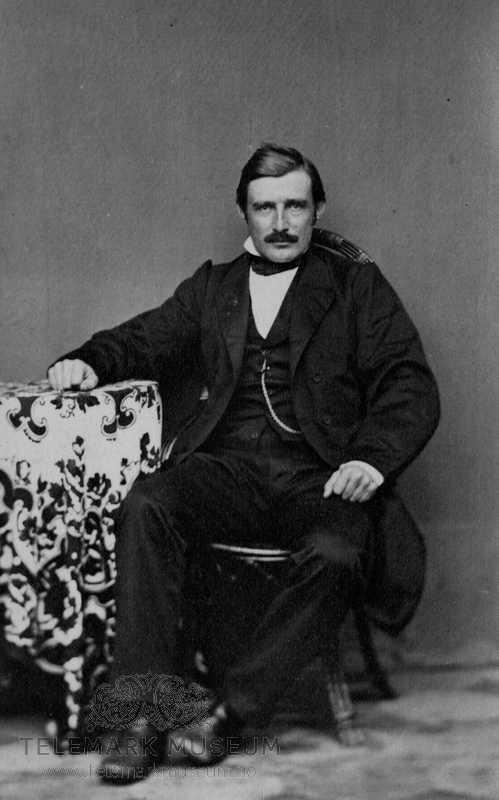
- Born: 10 April 1825; Kragerø, Norway
- Died: 17 June 1893 (aged 68)
- Occupation: Geologist
- Awards: Order of St. Olav; Order of the Polar Star

Tellef Dahll (10 April 1825, in Kragerø – 17 June 1893, in Morgedal) was a Norwegian mineralogist and geologist.

== Life ==
After graduating in mineralogy from the University of Christiania in 1846, Dahll worked for private mining companies. He found coal on the island of Andøya, iron ore at Bjørnevatn and in 1867 Dahll discovered gold from the Tana and Anarjohka rivers, which launched the 1870 gold rush in the Finnish Lapland. Since 1858 Dahll and Theodor Kjerulf led the first geological survey of Norway.

In 1879 Dahll collected samples of nickel arsenide and gersdorffite on the island of Oterøya in his birthplace Kragerø. Dahll found out that the rocks contained previously unknown element which he named Norwegium. The phosphate mineral dahllite (hydroxylapatite) is named after Tellef Dahll and his brother, the mineralogist Johann Dahll.
