= Luosto =

Hill in Sodankylä, Finland

Coordinates: 67.1500°N 26.8833°E

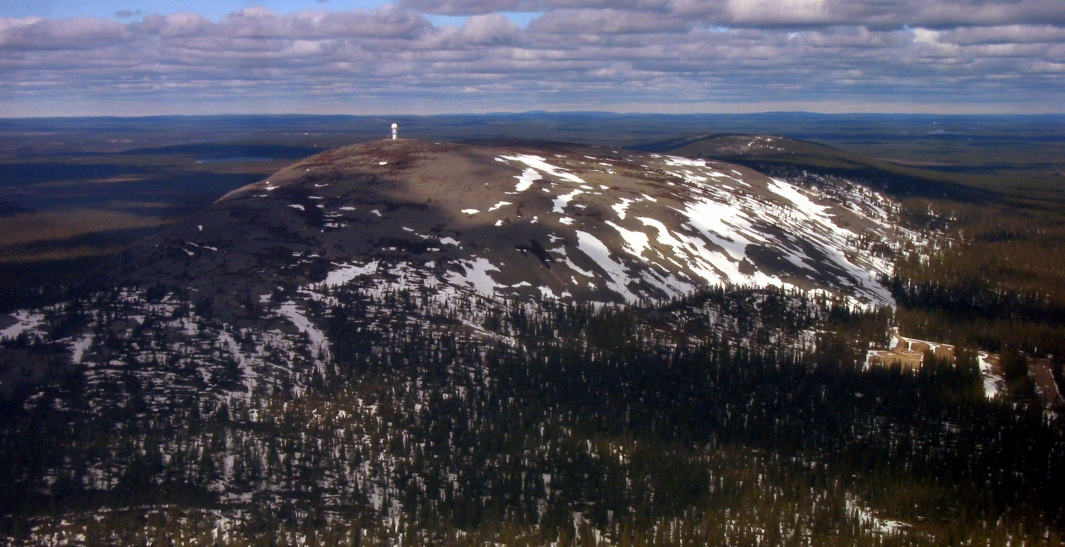
Luosto hill from air

Luosto is a fell in Finnish Lapland, in the Sodankylä municipality. It is about 510 metres (1,670 ft) high. It is part of Pyhä-Luosto National Park. There is a weather radar operated by the Finnish Meteorological Institute on the fell top. The Luosto ski resort and amethyst mine are nearby.

Kalevi Aho's 12th symphony is written in inspiration of this fell.

== Geography and Geology ==
Luosto is a prominent fell located in Sodankylä, Finnish Lapland, forming part of the southernmost fell chain in Finland within the Pyhä-Luosto National Park. Rising to approximately 510 metres (1,670 ft) above sea level, Luosto and its neighboring fells trace a northwest-to-southeast line, with their summits standing out above the generally flat landscape of Central Lapland. The fell is characterized by treeless peaks and rugged terrain, divided by deep gorges such as Isokuru, which reaches a depth of up to 220 metres (720 ft) meters and is the deepest gorge in Finland. These gorges were carved by glacial meltwaters during the last Ice Age, shaping dramatic relief and separating the fell ridge into distinct summits.

Luosto, along with the broader Pyhä-Luosto range, is geologically significant as part of some of the oldest mountains on Earth. The bedrock consists mainly of resilient quartzite, granite, gabbro, and schists, formed during the Proterozoic era nearly two billion years ago. What remains today are the deeply eroded roots of primordial mountains, which may have once stood as high as the modern Alps. Long-term erosion, aided by multiple cycles of glaciation during the Quaternary period, has gradually worn these formations down and sculpted the rounded, rugged landscape now visible across the area.

The geological history of Luosto is closely linked to the dynamics of the Scandinavian Ice Sheet during the Late Weichselian Ice Age. As glaciers advanced and retreated, they left behind a variety of landforms, including rare end moraine ridges found on the southern and western flanks of the Pyhä-Luosto fell chain. These ridges, composed of several till layers and featuring complex internal structures, attest to the region's dynamic ice margin oscillations during the deglaciation phase roughly 10,300 to 10,400 years ago. Additionally, time-transgressive proglacial lakes, such as the Ancylus Lake, partially inundated the area, influencing the deposition and geomorphology observed today.
