= Benjamin Anneberg =

Finnish politician

Benjamin Anneberg (3 May 1865 – 2 March 1925; original surname Onnela) was a Finnish lawyer and politician, born in Sodankylä. He was a member of the Parliament of Finland from 1909 to 1910, representing the Finnish Party.
