= Sodankylä Local History Museum =

History museum in Sodankylä, Finland

Coordinates: 67°24′12.5″N 26°35′23.5″E

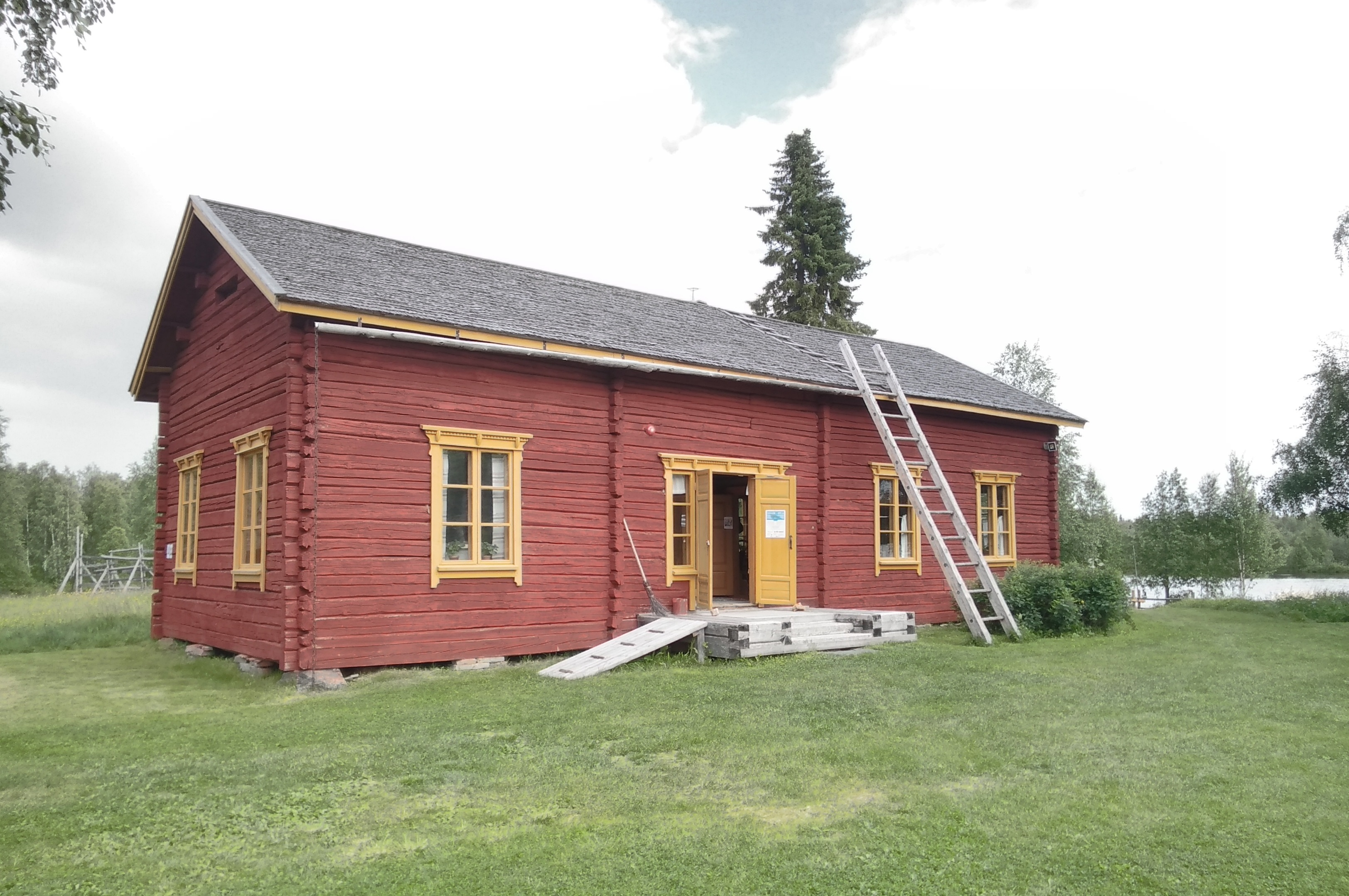
The Kuukkeli House

The Sodankylä Local History Museum (Finnish: Sodankylän kotiseutumuseo) is a Finnish local museum of the Sodankylä municipality presenting the peasant life of the early 20th century in the villages of Sodankylä and Sompio. The main building of the museum is the Kuukkeli House (built in 1906), which was moved from the village of Riesto, in the area of the current Loka reservoir. Around the main building there is a typical courtyard of the era: a warehouse, a smoke sauna and a pirrakota shelter, barns, the granaries of Penjus and Erkkilä, a workshop, a Lapland house, and a grain drying cabin. There are a total of 13 buildings. The warehouse, blacksmith's workshop and toll have been built on site using traditional methods to depict these buildings that belonged to the peasant's courtyard. Other buildings have been relocated from different parts of Sodankylä. The starting point of the museum's collections is the collection of objects and the recording of tradition, which was started by the Sodankylä Society in 1949. The Kuukkeli House was moved to the museum area in 1962.
