= Hanna Snellman =

Finnish ethnologist and professor

Hanna Snellmann FSA
- Born: 16 April 1961 (age 65); Sodankylä, Finland

Academic work
- Discipline: Ethnology
- Institutions: University of Helsinki; Lakehead University; University of Jyväskylä

Hanna Kyllikki Snellmann FSA (born 16 April 1961) is Professor of Ethnology and Vice-rector at the University of Helsinki. The focus of her research is on migration within and from the Arctic.

== Career ==
Snellmann completed her PhD in ethnology at the University of Helsinki in 1997. From 2004 to 2007 she was a research fellow with the Academy of Finland. In 2007 and 2008 she worked at the Lakehead University (Canada) and the Helsinki Collegium for Advanced Studies at the University of Helsinki. From 2009 to 2012 she was Professor of Ethnology at the University of Jyväskylä, leaving this post in 2014 to take up her current role back at the University of Helsinki.

Snellmann is a board member of the National Library of Finland.

She was admitted as a member of the Finnish Academy of Science and Letters in 2010. She was elected as a Fellow of the Society of Antiquaries of London on 12 December 2019.

== Select publications ==
- Snellman, H. 2019. "Kun Somalia jälleenrakentaa yliopistoaan, on Suomen vuoro auttaa", in Yliopisto : Helsingin yliopiston tiedelehti.
- Halmari, H., Kaukonen, S., Snellman, H. & Virtanen, H-J. 2018. ""Let Us Be Finns": The Era before Finland's Independence", in Halmari, H., Kaukonen, S., Snellman, H. & Virtanen, H-J. (eds.) The Making of Finland: The Era of the Grand Duchy (Journal of Finnish Studies; vol. 21/2018, no. 1 & 2 ).
- Snellman, H. 2017. "Cookbooks for Upstairs: Ethnicity, Class and Gender in Perspective", in Beaulieu, M. S., Ratz, D. & Harpelle, R. (eds.), Hard Work Conquers All: The Finnish-Canadian Experience. UBC Press. pp185–206.
- Snellman, H. K. & Kaunisto, K. 2017. "Opitun ja aistien varassa - Työn arjen teknologinen muutos", in Männistö-Funk, T. (ed.). Tekniikan maa. (Tekniikan museon julkaisuja; vol. 9).
- Snellman, H. K. & Weckström, L. 2017. "The Apple Never Falls Far from the Tree: Or does it? Finnish Female Migrant Transnational Generations on the Swedish Labor Market", Journal of Finnish studies 20(2). pp77–97.
- Snellman, H. 2016. "An Ethnography of Nostalgia: Nordic Museum Curators Interviewing Finnish Immigrants in Sweden", Journal of Finnish studies 19(2), pp158–177.
