= Pyhä-Luosto National Park =

National park in Lapland region, Finland

- IUCN category II (national park)
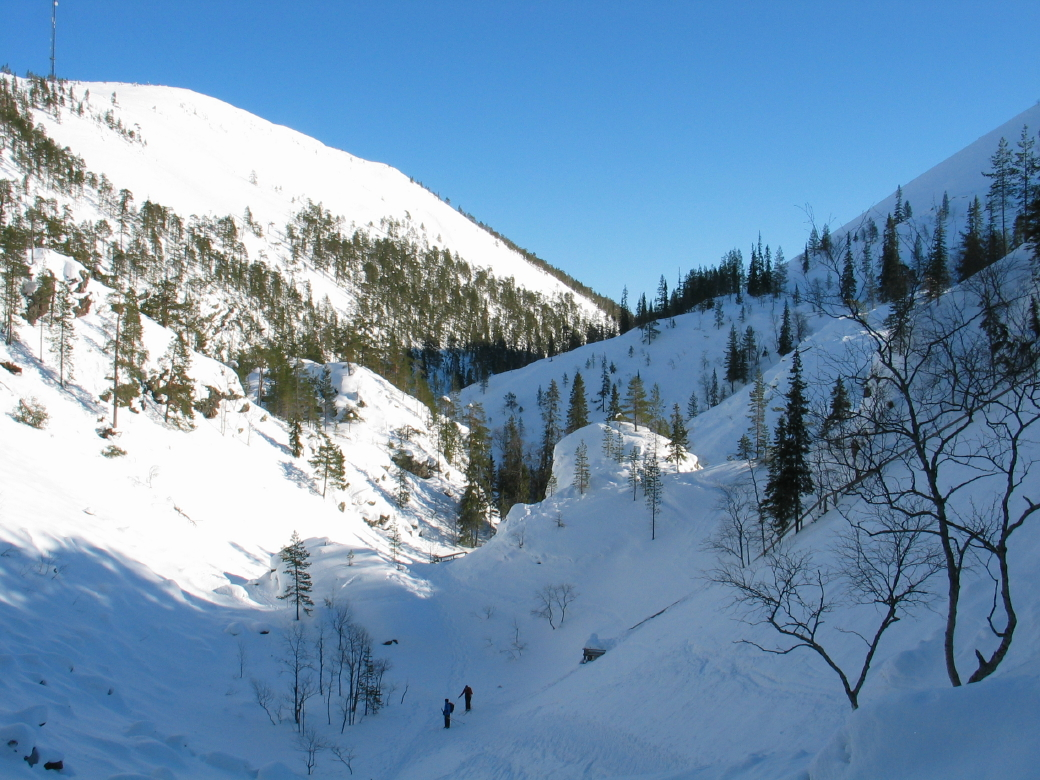
- Isokuru in March 2006

- Location within Finland
- Location: Lapland, Finland
- Coordinates: 67°03′59″N 26°58′25″E
- Area: 142 km^{2} (55 sq mi)
- Established: 2005
- Visitors: 198,900 (in 2024)
- Governing body: Metsähallitus
- Website: https://www.luontoon.fi/en/destinations/pyha-luosto-national-park

Pyhä-Luosto National Park (Pyhä-Luoston kansallispuisto) is a national park in Lapland, Finland. It was established in 2005 when Finland's oldest national park, Pyhätunturi National Park (established in 1938), was joined to Luosto. This makes Pyhä-Luosto both one of Finland's oldest and newest national parks. The park covers 142 square kilometres (55 sq mi). Its most important features are its geological specialities, old forests and wetlands.

The park's base is formed by Finland's southernmost, 12-peak tunturi line. The tunturit are remnants of 2-billion-year-old Alp-like mountains. Pine tree forests that are 200 years old or older grow on the hills. The highest tunturit are Noitatunturi, 540 m (1,772 ft), and Ukko-Luosto, 514 m (1,686 ft).

In 2015, the visitor count was 115,100 people, which was a decrease from the 2009 count of 128,000. Since then Pyhä-Luosto has grown in popularity and ranked as Finland's fifth most visited national park in 2023, with nearly 199,000 visits reported in 2024.

== Nature ==
Pyhä-Luosto National Park's landscape consists of the southernmost large fell chain in Finland. The park comprises a stretch of twelve prominent fell summits, part of a 35-kilometer-long quartzite ridge system that represents remnants of one of the oldest mountain ranges on Earth, dating back nearly two billion years. A notable natural formation in the park is Isokuru Gorge, Finland's deepest gorge, which plunges over 200 metres (660 ft) and exposes visible wave patterns in quartzite rocks, highlighting the effects of glacial processes during the Ice Ages.

The park hosts a rich boreal ecosystem. The lower slopes and valleys are blanketed by old-growth pine and spruce forests, with some trees exceeding 400 years in age, among the oldest in Finland. These natural state forests host rare and endangered species of polypore fungi that rely on dead wood for their survival, as well as traditional boreal flora such as lingonberry, cloudberry, and crowberry. The forests also provide a critical habitat for woodpeckers, Siberian jays (the park's emblematic bird) and numerous other species.

== See also ==
- List of national parks of Finland
- Protected areas of Finland
