= Selim Lemström =

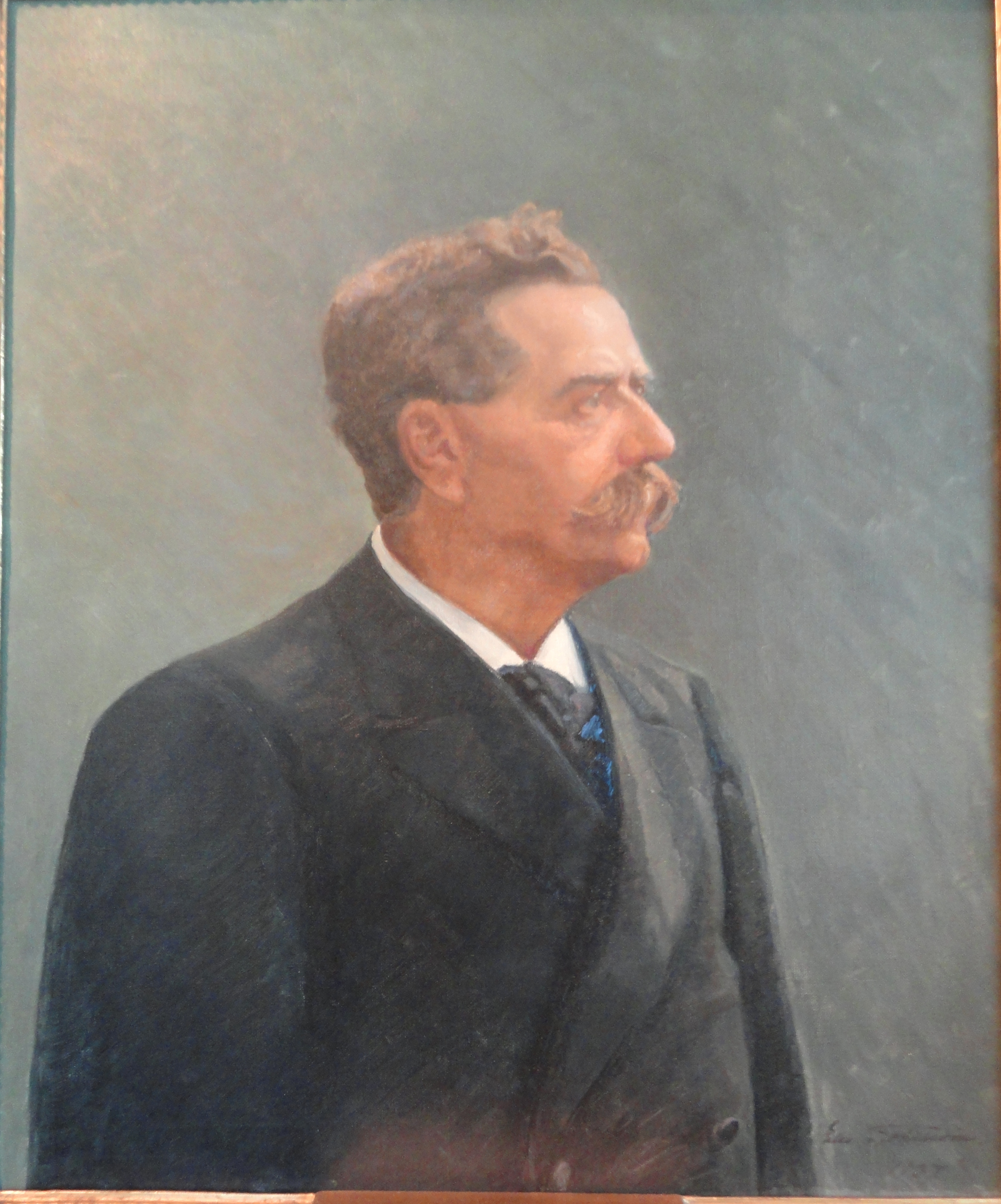
Portrait of Selim Lemström by Elsa Fohström, unknown date

Karl Selim Lemström (17 November 1838 in Ingå – 2 October 1904 in Helsinki), was a Finnish geophysicist. Lemström is best known on his research of aurora borealis. He had several expeditions in Finnish Lapland and even tried to create an artificial northern lights in the laboratory. In 1870 Lemström studied the metric system in Paris and introduced the system to Finland. Since 1872 he was a professor in the University of Helsinki. Lemström has been described as the "forgotten pioneer of northern light studies," and some of his experiments have been compared with the ones made by Nikola Tesla.

== Aurora research ==
In 1868 Lemström participated the Swedish expedition to Spitsbergen on the Svalbard Islands, led by Adolf Erik Nordenskiöld. On the way to the Arctic, Lemström studied aurora borealis in Tromsø and continued his observations in Svalbard. In Lapland Lemström took part at the first International Polar Year 1882–1884 and found out that the phenomenon could not be caused by an electric current in the atmosphere. These spectroscopic analyses are considered as his greatest contribution to the aurora research. Some of Lemström's theories were later tested by the Norwegian scientist Kristian Birkeland.
