= Andreas Alariesto =

Finnish painter

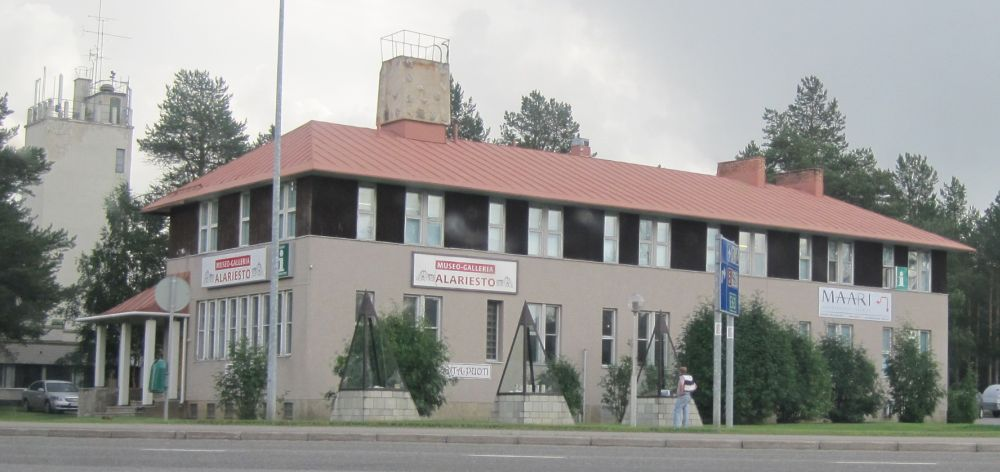
Alariesto gallery

Andreas Alariesto (December 11, 1900 – November 29, 1989) was a Finnish painter from Sompio, Lapland, who worked in the naïve style. He also made miniatures and sculptures about miniatures, and was also a photographer. He had no formal artistic training.

Alariesto was born in Riesto. He became famous in the 1970s with an increase in the popularity of naïve art. His first formal show was in Helsinki and Rovaniemi in 1976 when the artist was 75 years old. He died in Sodankylä, aged 88.
