= Ensio Seppänen =

Finnish sculptor and professor (1924-2008)

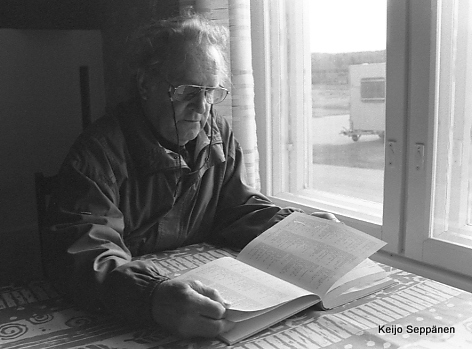
- Born: 7 September 1924; Kemi
- Died: 28 June 2008 (aged 83); Kemi
- Occupation: Sculptor
- Years active: 1950–2005
- Known for: Public sculptures, memorials

Kauko Ensio Seppänen (7 September 1924 in Kemi – 28 June 2008 in Kemi) was a Finnish sculptor, professor (1978) and sculpture pioneer in Lapland. He created a total of 127 public sculptures. On the occasion of his crafting more public sculptures than any other artist in Finland, the 7 September 1984 issue of Finnish newspaper Helsingin Sanomat bore the headline "Sculptor Ensio Seppänen, is a Finnish record man".

Seppänen was granted an artist's pension in 1985. He belonged to a small group of artists able to provide livelihoods for themselves and their families by their art without grants. He made his last public sculpture at the age of 81, in 2005.

== Family ==
Seppänen's parents were the carpenter Kaarlo Seppänen, and Martta Seppänen (née Järvinen). He married Tyyne Korhonen in 1958. They had two children, Timo and Keijo.

== Production ==
Seppänen's sculptures are cast in bronze and granite, molded in various ways, and formatted with stainless steel welding. A characteristic feature of the sculptures is that the accessories and tools have a historically correct look. Most of the works are custom orders. In addition to public works, he had made a limited number of tomb sculptures, reliefs, memorial stone plans, portraits, medals, plaques and figurines for individuals, as well as designed sports and NGO flags and hand programs. Many of his sculptures are associated with war memorials and historic events. His memorial sculpture Kvenmonumentet (Immigrant's Monument) in Vadsø, Norway, was unveiled in 1977 before three heads of state: the Norwegian and Swedish kings and the President of Finland. Most of Seppänen's monuments are located in the north of Finland, Sweden and Norway.

A multi-talented artist, he designed and drew 13 buildings, some of which are located in Sweden, and was involved in the design of the Dunder 2060 snowmobile. He also designed and built his family caravan. In his spare time, he made a variety of furniture and implements as well as a snow tractor. He was Kemi City Theatre's set designer from 1959–1965.

Seppänen studied at The Finnish Art Academy School at the Ateneum from 1946–1949 and the Accademia di Belle Arti di Firenze in Italy 1956–1957, he also appeared as an assistant in the film Souvenir d'Italie (1957), which starred Vittorio de Sica.

His debut exhibition was in Rovaniemi in 1950. Ensio Seppänen did not consider it necessary to participate in exhibitions, with the exception of a career in the early stages, due to the large number of commissioned assignments. Among the accolades he received were the 1995 naming of a street in Kemi (Ensio Seppäsen Kuja) and the First Class Knight of the White Rose of Finland in 1998.

== Invited competition awards ==
- 1st place Savukoski Statue Competition, 1962
- 2nd place Oulu Oy Statue Competition, 1964
- 2nd place Kaukovainio Shrine Relief Competition, 1980
- 1st place Rovaniemi Statue Competition, 1981
- 1st place Kajaani Statue Competition, 1982
- 1st place Eero Mäntyranta Statue Competition, 1996
- 1st place Russian Salla Statue Competition, 1998

== Artworks in collections ==
- The Kemi Art Museum's Collections
- The Kemi Local History Museum's Collections
- The President Urho Kekkonen's Collections, Helsinki
- The Aine Art Museum's Collections, Tornio
- The Veli Aine Collections, Tornio
- The Norbotten Provincial Government Collections, Luleå, Sweden
- The LL.M. Kalle Länsitie Collections, Oulu
- The Councillor of State Martti Miettunen Collections, Helsinki
- The Luleå University of Technology, Luleå, Sweden
- The Kemi Volunteer Fire Brigade's Collections, Kemi
- The University of Lapland's Collections, Rovaniemi

== Selected publications ==
- Arbeidet memonument searelset gang I 1970, article Finnmarken 18.6.1977, Norway,
- Innvandrermonumentet "født i smerte", article Finnmarken 18.6.1977, Norway.
- Ensio Seppänen's cultural heritage on Twitter.
- Finnish Blog
- Expogafia
