= Sodankylä =

Sodankylä Sodankylä (Finnish) Soađegilli (Northern Sami) Suáđigil (Inari Sami) Suäʹđjel (Skolt Sami)
- Municipality
- Sodankylän kunta Soađegili gielda Sodankylä kommun
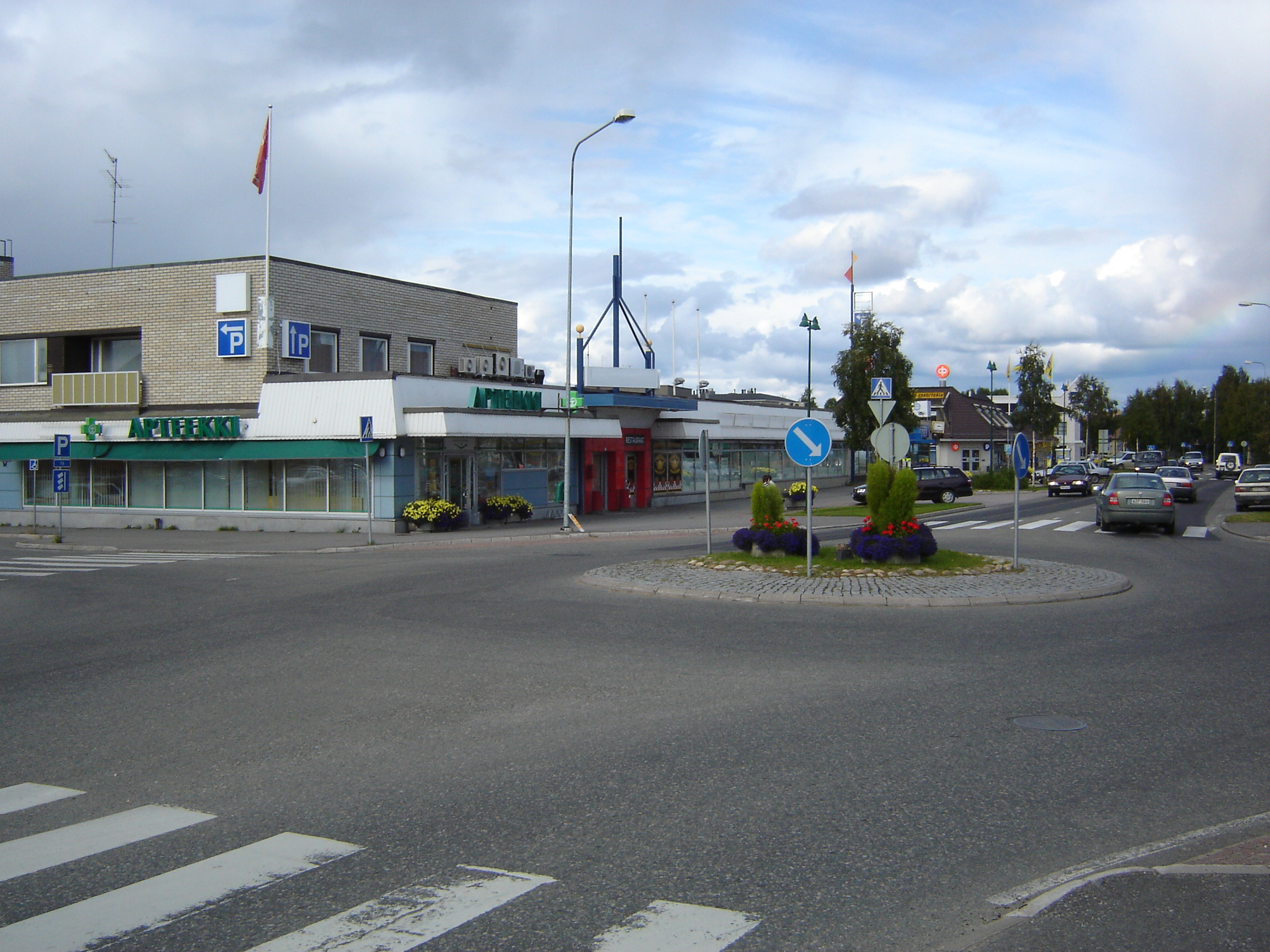
- Centre of Sodankylä

- Coat of arms

- Location of Sodankylä in Finland
- OpenStreetMap Interactive map outlining Sodankylä.
- Interactive map of Sodankylä
- Coordinates: 67°25′N 026°35′E
- Country: Finland
- Region: Lapland
- Sub-region: Northern Lapland
- Charter: 1893

Government
  - Municipal manager: Jari Rantapelkonen

Area (2018-01-01)
  - Total: 12,415.50 km^{2} (4,793.65 sq mi)
  - Land: 11,692.98 km^{2} (4,514.68 sq mi)
  - Water: 718.65 km^{2} (277.47 sq mi)
  - Rank: 2nd largest in Finland

Population (2025-12-31)
  - Total: 8,095
  - Rank: 117th largest in Finland
  - Density: 0.69/km^{2} (1.8/sq mi)

Population by native language
  - Finnish: 95.1% (official)
  - Swedish: 0.1%
  - Sami: 1.6%
  - Others: 3.2%

Population by age
  - 0 to 14: 13.3%
  - 15 to 64: 58.5%
  - 65 or older: 28.2%
- Time zone: UTC+02:00 (EET)
  - Summer (DST): UTC+03:00 (EEST)
- Website: www.sodankyla.fi/en/

Sodankylä (Finnish: [ˈsodɑŋˌkylæ]; Northern Sami: Soađegilli [ˈso̯ɑðeˌkilːiː]; Inari Sami: Suáđigil; Skolt Sami: Suäʹđjel) is a municipality of Finland. It is located in the region of Lapland, and lies at the northern end of Highway 5 (E63) and along Highway 4 (E75). The Kitinen River flows near the center of Sodankylä. Its neighbouring municipalities are Inari, Kemijärvi, Kittilä, Pelkosenniemi, Rovaniemi, and Savukoski. The municipality has two official languages: Finnish and Northern Sami.

The municipality has a population of 8,095, (31 December 2025) which makes it the fourth largest municipality in Lapland after Rovaniemi, Tornio and Kemi, and at the same time the largest municipality in population that does not use the title of city or town. It covers an area of 12,415.50 square kilometres (4,793.65 sq mi) of which 718.65 km^{2} (277.47 sq mi) is water, making it the second largest municipality in Finland in terms of area, right after its neighboring municipality of Inari. The population density is 0.69 inhabitants per square kilometre (1.8/sq mi).

Sodankylä has an airfield. Also, one of EISCAT's scientific radar receiver stations is located outside Sodankylä, at the site of the Sodankylä Geophysical Observatory. The urban area around the observatory is known as "Tähtelä", which translates as "Place of Stars", although the observatory does not observe stars. The Jaeger Brigade of the Finnish Army is also located in Sodankylä. There is also much mining in Sodankylä, as the Pahtavaara mine (Pahtavaaran kaivos), which was opened in 1996 and focused on gold, and the Kevitsa mine (Kevitsan kaivos), which started commercial nickel mining production in 2012, operates in the municipality's territory. Although the name "Sodankylä" and (also "Soađegilli") directly translate to "Village of War", the etymology of the name is from a surname Sova rather than the word "war".

Since 1986, Sodankylä has been home to the Midnight Sun Film Festival (Sodankylän elokuvajuhlat).

== Key sights, events and destinations ==
- Sodankylä Local History Museum
- The Old Church (made 1689 of wood), The New Church (made 1859 of stone)
- Tankavaara, gold museum, gold village
- Ilmakkiaapa peatland protection area (35 km north)
- Urho Kekkonen National Park (Koilliskaira Visitor Centre)
- Luosto – a hill home to the only open amethyst mine in Europe
- Hotel Sodankylä and Hotel Bear Inn (Hotelli Karhu)
- Midnight Sun Film Festival (annually mid-June)
- Museum-Gallery Alariesto (Andreas Alariesto's life and artwork)
- Pappilanniemi walking trail
- Igloo village of Kakslauttanen

=== The old church ===
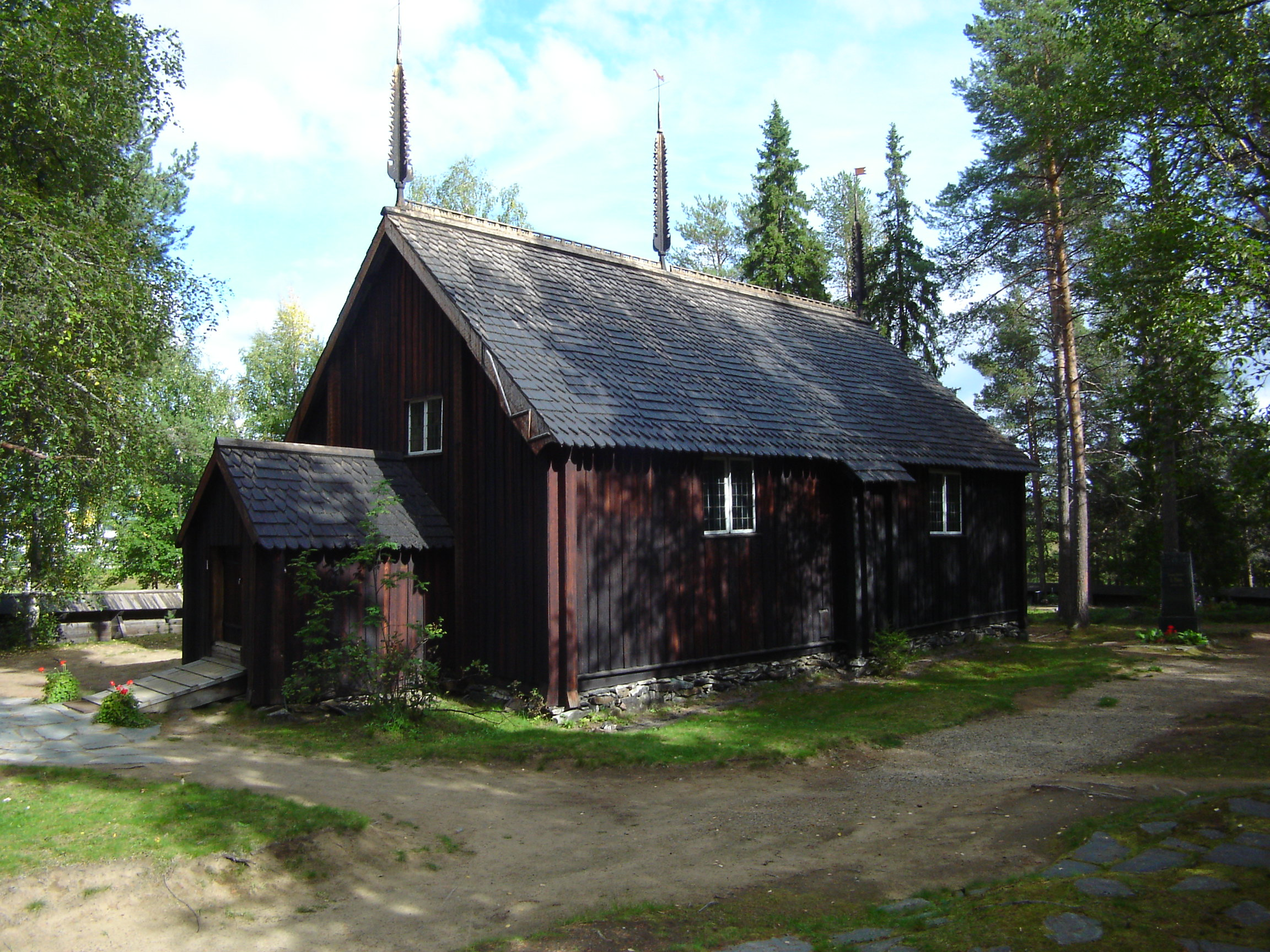
Sodankylä Old Church

The old church of Sodankylä is one of the oldest churches in Lapland. The church was built in 1689 for the people of Middle Lapland. It was restored in 1926, and the shingles and the boarding were re-done between 1991 and 1995 by the National Board of Antiquities and Historical Monuments. The church is still open at summer time.

=== The statue "A reindeer and a Lapp" ===
Sculptor Ensio Seppänen designed this statue in 1970, located in the center of Sodankylä. The bronze statue presents reindeer husbandry, which still is one of the most important trades in Sodankylä.

=== Tankavaara Gold Museum ===
The International Gold Museum of Tankavaara presents the history of Finnish gold, as well as the history of the world's major gold rushes. A display called Golden world, tells the story of gold in more than 20 countries. The outdoor museum is housed within several historic buildings and the courtyard is decorated with a large bronze statue of a gold prospector, by the artist professor Ensio Seppänen. The museum's stone and mineral collection has more than 2500 samples on display from around the world.

=== Museum-gallery Alariesto ===
Andreas Alariesto (1900-1986) was a painter from Sodankylä.

Museum-gallery Alariesto was opened in July 1986. The museum's permanent exhibition displays artist Andreas Alariesto's life and works. It was maintained by Riikka and Andreas Alariesto's Lapinkuvat ("pictures of Lapland") Foundation and the Municipality of Sodankylä. The foundation's main goal was to take care of Alariesto's collected works and to preserve the Sami cultural traditions of the historical Sompio area. In 2020, the foundation was merged with Kauko Sorjonen Foundation.

== Geography ==
Sodankylä lies just north of the Arctic Circle.

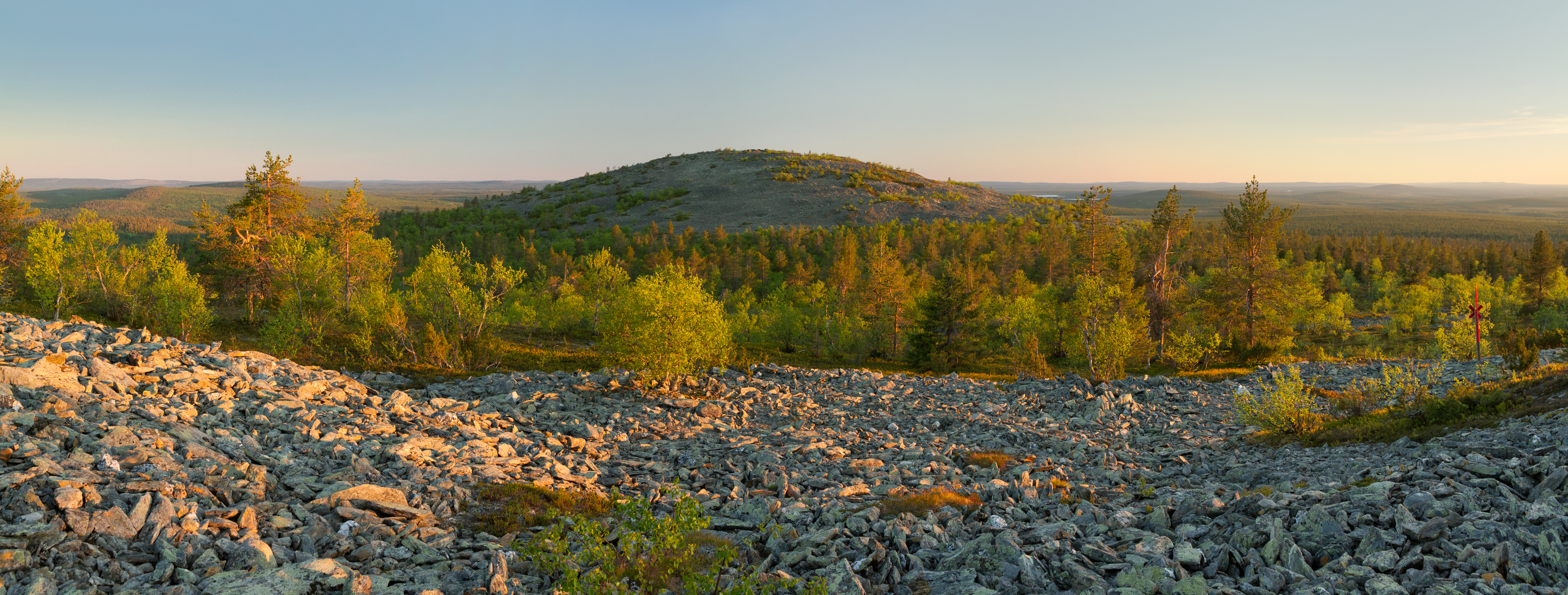
Midnight landscape in June

=== Climate ===
Sodankylä has a subarctic climate (Köppen: Dfc), with short, mild summers and long, freezing, extremely snowy winters. However global warming has brought more extreme snowfalls, typically an increase. Its extreme northerly location combined with frequent overcast skies leads to very low amounts of sunshine in the winter months; December will average just under two minutes of sunshine daily. Sodankylä experiences polar night between 20 and 23 December and polar day between 31 May and 14 July. The temperature is usually between −19.6 °C (−3.3 °F) and 19.4 °C (66.9 °F), but the all-time temperature range is between −49.5 °C (−57.1 °F) recorded on 28 January 1999 and 32.1 °C (89.8 °F) recorded on 18 July 2018.

Climate data for Sodankylä Tähtelä, elevation: 179 metres or 587 feet, 1991-2020 normals, extremes 1906-present
Month	Jan	Feb	Mar	Apr	May	Jun	Jul	Aug	Sep	Oct	Nov	Dec	Year
Record high °C (°F)	6.5 (43.7)	6.5 (43.7)	11.1 (52.0)	17.4 (63.3)	28.1 (82.6)	31.2 (88.2)	32.1 (89.8)	31.2 (88.2)	24.0 (75.2)	14.5 (58.1)	9.2 (48.6)	7.0 (44.6)	32.1 (89.8)
Mean maximum °C (°F)	1.3 (34.3)	1.8 (35.2)	5.7 (42.3)	11.3 (52.3)	21.3 (70.3)	25.4 (77.7)	26.9 (80.4)	25.1 (77.2)	18.2 (64.8)	9.9 (49.8)	3.6 (38.5)	2.2 (36.0)	28.1 (82.6)
Mean daily maximum °C (°F)	−8.1 (17.4)	−7.6 (18.3)	−1.8 (28.8)	4.0 (39.2)	10.5 (50.9)	16.9 (62.4)	20.2 (68.4)	17.4 (63.3)	11.1 (52.0)	2.9 (37.2)	−2.8 (27.0)	−5.7 (21.7)	4.8 (40.6)
Daily mean °C (°F)	−12.5 (9.5)	−12.1 (10.2)	−7.1 (19.2)	−0.8 (30.6)	5.6 (42.1)	11.9 (53.4)	15.0 (59.0)	12.4 (54.3)	7.0 (44.6)	0.0 (32.0)	−5.8 (21.6)	−9.6 (14.7)	0.3 (32.6)
Mean daily minimum °C (°F)	−17.5 (0.5)	−17.2 (1.0)	−12.9 (8.8)	−6.0 (21.2)	0.7 (33.3)	6.9 (44.4)	10.1 (50.2)	7.8 (46.0)	3.3 (37.9)	−2.8 (27.0)	−9.2 (15.4)	−14.0 (6.8)	−4.2 (24.4)
Mean minimum °C (°F)	−34.7 (−30.5)	−34.0 (−29.2)	−29.5 (−21.1)	−20.1 (−4.2)	−6.8 (19.8)	0.5 (32.9)	3.8 (38.8)	−0.1 (31.8)	−4.0 (24.8)	−14.9 (5.2)	−23.3 (−9.9)	−29.7 (−21.5)	−37.0 (−34.6)
Record low °C (°F)	−49.5 (−57.1)	−49 (−56)	−42.7 (−44.9)	−36 (−33)	−21.3 (−6.3)	−5.0 (23.0)	−3.4 (25.9)	−5.5 (22.1)	−16.8 (1.8)	−31.8 (−25.2)	−42 (−44)	−46.9 (−52.4)	−49.5 (−57.1)
Average precipitation mm (inches)	36 (1.4)	31 (1.2)	30 (1.2)	32 (1.3)	40 (1.6)	61 (2.4)	76 (3.0)	56 (2.2)	52 (2.0)	47 (1.9)	42 (1.7)	41 (1.6)	544 (21.5)
Average precipitation days (≥ 1.0 mm)	10	8	8	7	8	11	11	9	9	9	11	10	111
Average relative humidity (%)	86	85	78	72	67	66	71	78	83	89	91	88	80
Mean monthly sunshine hours	12	59	141	187	224	245	251	174	107	57	17	1	1,486
Source 1: FMI climatological normals for Finland 1991-2020
Source 2: record highs and lows

Climate data for Sodankylä Vuotso (1991-2020 normals, extremes 1959–present)
Month	Jan	Feb	Mar	Apr	May	Jun	Jul	Aug	Sep	Oct	Nov	Dec	Year
Record high °C (°F)	6.0 (42.8)	6.1 (43.0)	9.5 (49.1)	14.8 (58.6)	26.9 (80.4)	30.6 (87.1)	31.7 (89.1)	30.8 (87.4)	22.3 (72.1)	12.2 (54.0)	10.0 (50.0)	5.7 (42.3)	31.7 (89.1)
Mean maximum °C (°F)	0.5 (32.9)	0.9 (33.6)	4.4 (39.9)	9.9 (49.8)	19.0 (66.2)	24.6 (76.3)	26.2 (79.2)	23.9 (75.0)	17.2 (63.0)	8.9 (48.0)	2.7 (36.9)	1.8 (35.2)	27.3 (81.1)
Mean daily maximum °C (°F)	−8.8 (16.2)	−8.5 (16.7)	−3.0 (26.6)	2.7 (36.9)	8.8 (47.8)	15.6 (60.1)	19.1 (66.4)	16.1 (61.0)	10.0 (50.0)	1.9 (35.4)	−4.0 (24.8)	−6.3 (20.7)	3.6 (38.5)
Daily mean °C (°F)	−13.2 (8.2)	−13 (9)	−8.2 (17.2)	−2.0 (28.4)	4.2 (39.6)	10.6 (51.1)	13.9 (57.0)	11.3 (52.3)	6.1 (43.0)	−0.9 (30.4)	−6.9 (19.6)	−10.5 (13.1)	−0.7 (30.7)
Mean daily minimum °C (°F)	−18.3 (−0.9)	−18.2 (−0.8)	−14.3 (6.3)	−7.3 (18.9)	−0.4 (31.3)	5.6 (42.1)	8.8 (47.8)	6.6 (43.9)	2.1 (35.8)	−3.9 (25.0)	−11.2 (11.8)	−15.0 (5.0)	−5.5 (22.1)
Mean minimum °C (°F)	−34.3 (−29.7)	−33.9 (−29.0)	−29.9 (−21.8)	−22.0 (−7.6)	−8.5 (16.7)	−0.4 (31.3)	1.6 (34.9)	−1.9 (28.6)	−5.6 (21.9)	−17.0 (1.4)	−24.4 (−11.9)	−30.3 (−22.5)	−37.0 (−34.6)
Record low °C (°F)	−49 (−56)	−47.1 (−52.8)	−41.7 (−43.1)	−32.7 (−26.9)	−22.7 (−8.9)	−4.9 (23.2)	−3.3 (26.1)	−7.3 (18.9)	−18.7 (−1.7)	−29.3 (−20.7)	−36.1 (−33.0)	−40.3 (−40.5)	−49 (−56)
Source 1: https://www.ilmatieteenlaitos.fi/ilmastollinen-vertailukausi
Source 2: https://kilotavu.com/asema-taulukko.php?asema=102001

== Twin towns ==
- Kola, Russia, since 1968
- Berlevåg, Norway, since 1971
- Norsjö, Sweden, since 1977
- Heiligenblut, Austria, since 1979
- Révfülöp, Hungary
- Szigethalom, Hungary

== Gallery ==
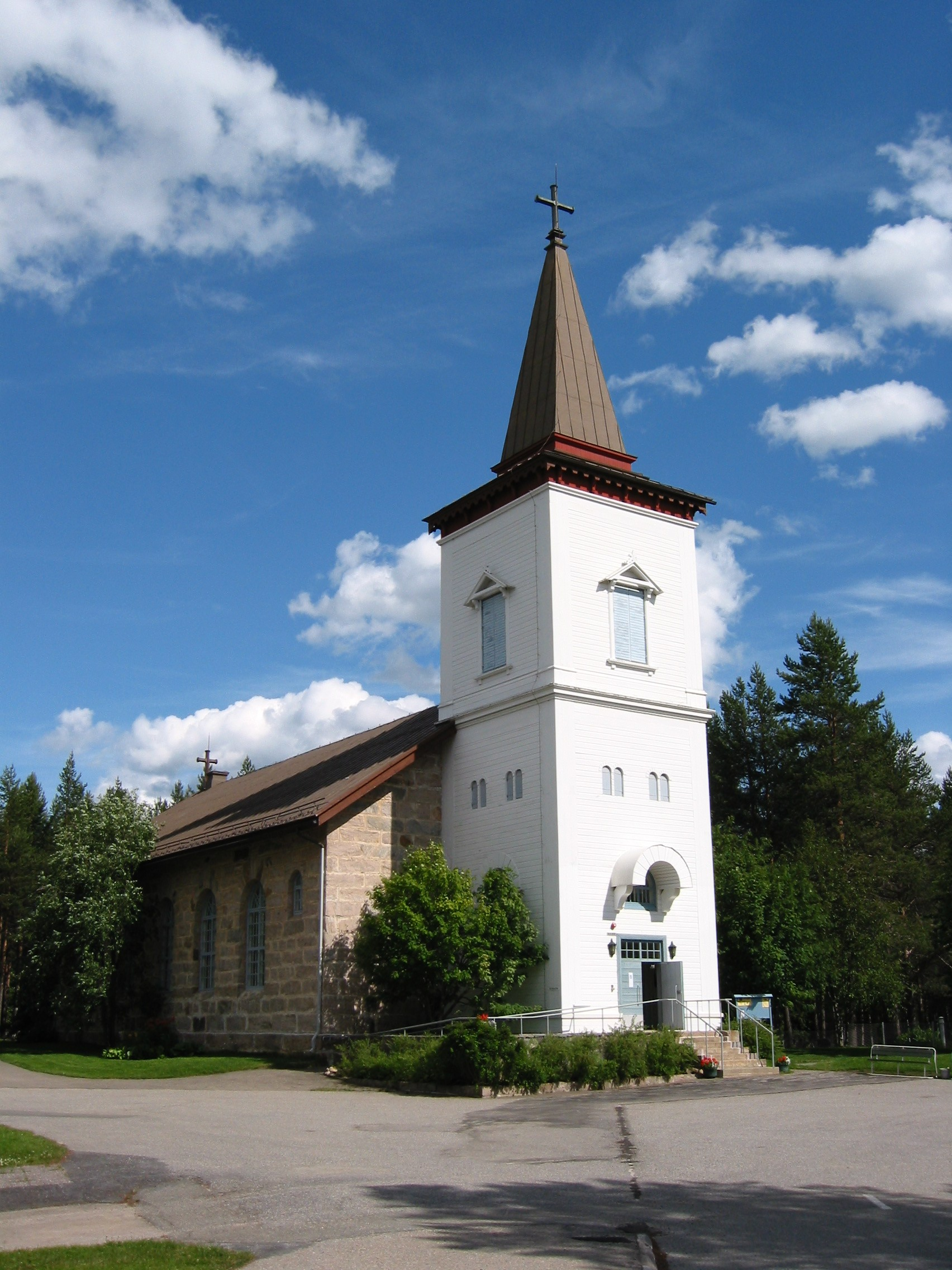
Sodankylä New Church

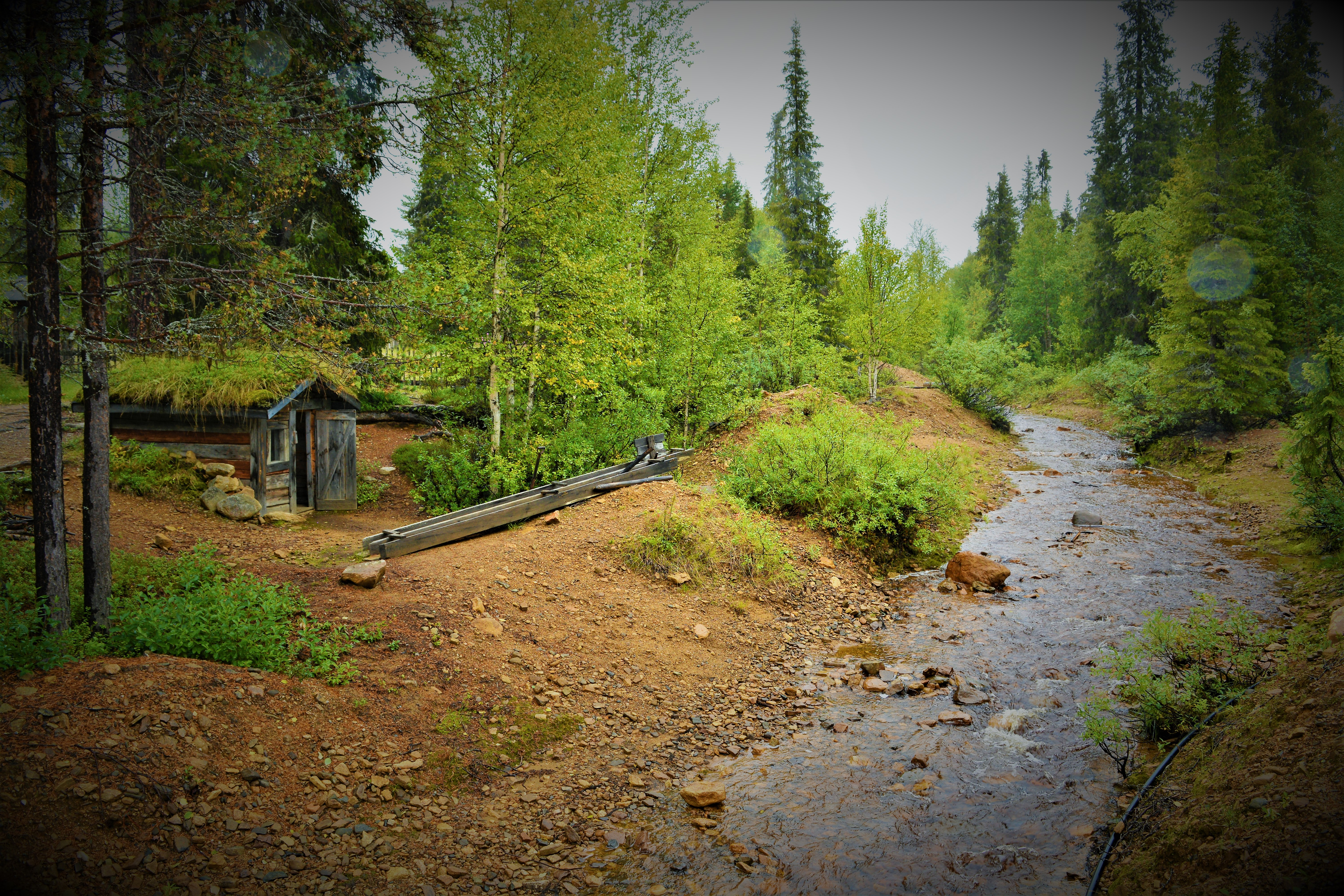
Tankavaara's gold prospecting stream

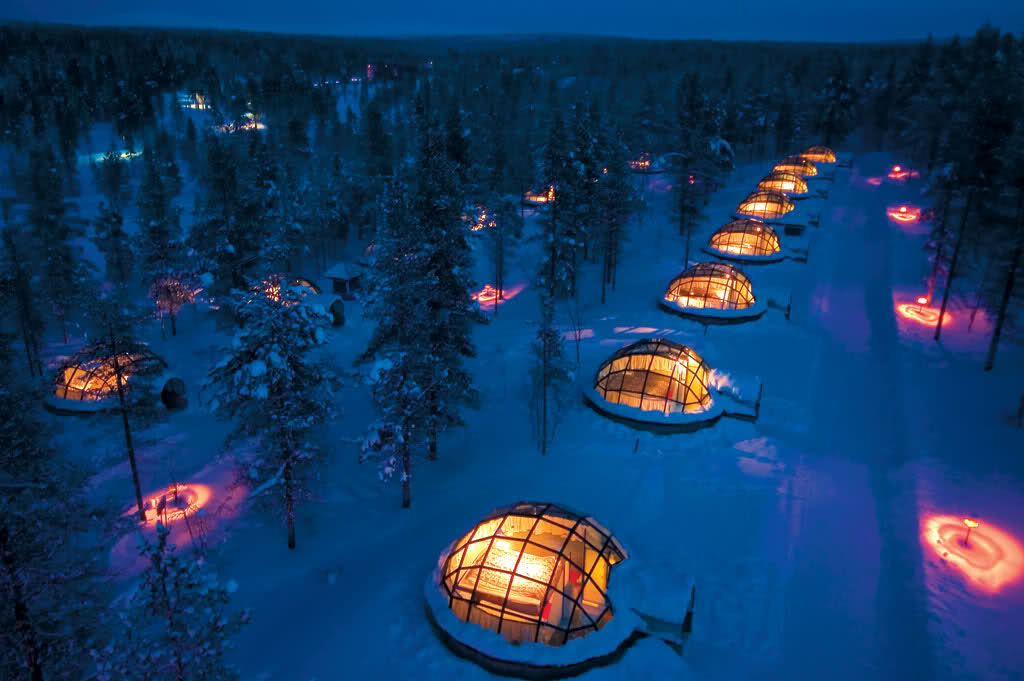
Igloo village of Kakslauttanen

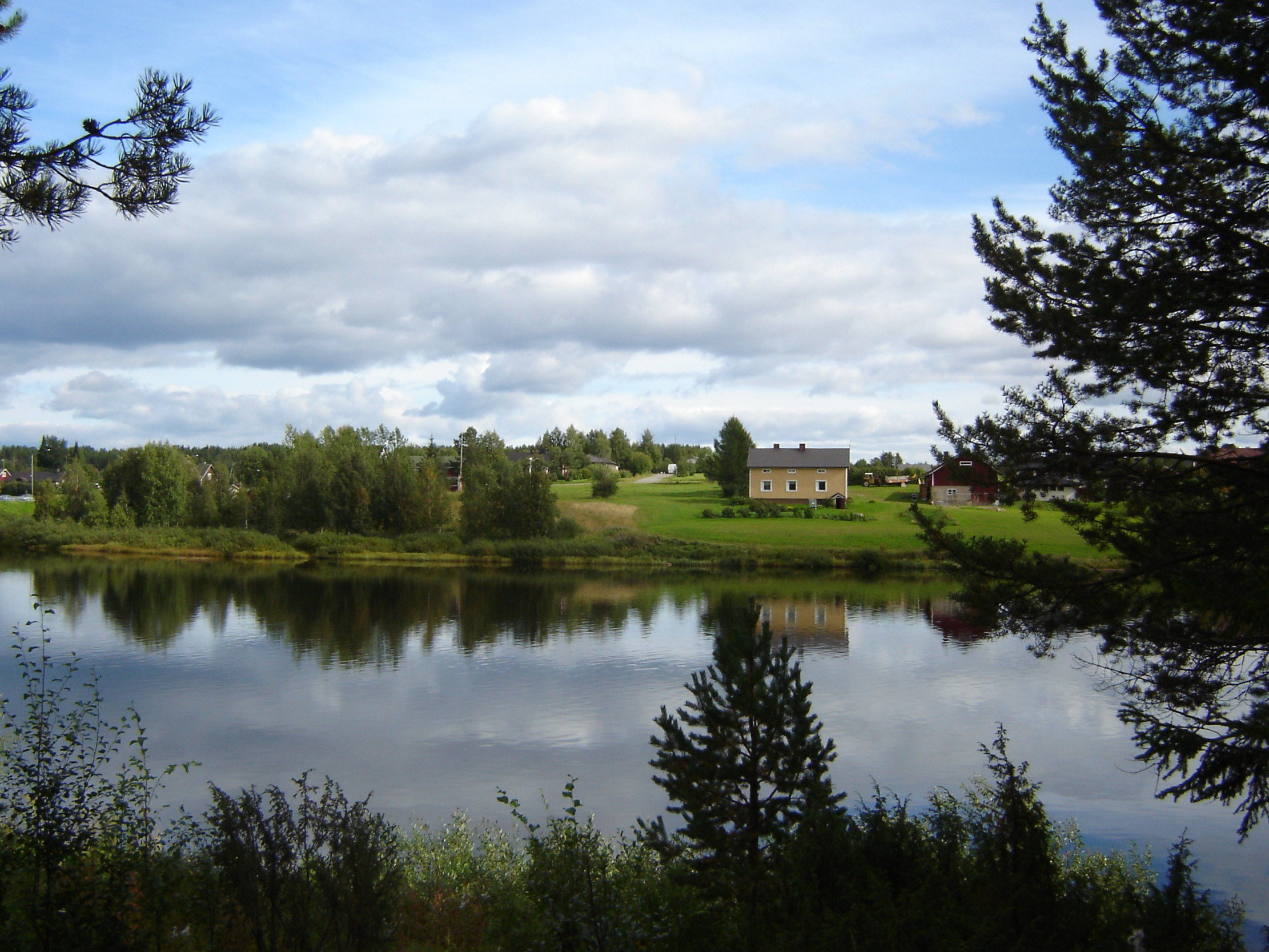
The Kitinen River in Sodankylä

== Notable people ==
- Andreas Alariesto (1900–1989), painter
- Benjamin Anneberg (1865–1925), lawyer and politician
- Aleksi Hihnavaara (1882–1938), frontiersman and reindeer herder
- Kaija Kärkinen (born 1962), singer and actress
- Maria Lähteenmäki (born 1957), history researcher and university professor
- Lasse Näsi (1930–2022), politician
- Katja Riipi (born 1975), retired ice hockey player
- Johanna Sinisalo (born 1958), science fiction and fantasy writer
- Pertti Ukkola (born 1950), wrestler and Olympic champion

== See also ==
- Jeesiö
- Sodankylä Airfield
- Unari
