= 104th Rifle Division =

104th Mountain Rifle Division (March 1939 – July 1940) 104th Rifle Division (July 1940 – July 1945)
- Active: 1939–1945
- Country: Soviet Union
- Branch: Red Army (1939-46)
- Type: Mountain Infantry, Infantry
- Size: Division
- Engagements: Winter War; Battle of Petsamo; Continuation War; Operation Arctic Fox; Defense of the Arctic; Siege of Budapest; Operation Konrad; Operation Spring Awakening; Vienna offensive Nagykanizsa–Körmend offensive

Commanders
- Notable commanders: Maj. Gen. Vladimir Ivanovich Shcherbakov; Maj. Gen. Stepan Ilich Morozov; Col. Ivan Ivanovich Vnukov; Maj. Gen. Georgii Andreevich Zhukov; Col. Ivan Vasilevich Obydenkin

The 104th Rifle Division was originally formed as a mountain infantry division of the Red Army in March 1939, in the Leningrad Military District, based roughly on the shtat (table of organization and equipment) for mountain divisions of that period, due to its intended deployment in the Arctic. During the Winter War with Finland it was part of 14th Army in the Kola Peninsula and initially struck west into the Rybachy Peninsula, quickly taking it from limited Finnish forces, then pushed down the Arctic Highway from Petsamo toward Rovaniemi where it was planned to link up with the 122nd Rifle Division. Due to Finnish resistance and mid-winter Arctic conditions it only reached halfway to this objective before halting for the duration of the war. At the start of the Continuation War against Germany and Finland it was paired up with the 122nd, still in 14th Army. Beginning on July 1, 1941, the German XXXVI Mountain Corps launched an offensive against the 104th and 122nd, with the objective of reaching Kandalaksha and cutting the railway from Murmansk to the rest of the USSR. The divisions conducted a successful retrograde action over the following months, holding the German/Finnish forces well short of the railway when the offensive ended in September. In April 1942 both divisions were transferred to 19th Army. The 104th would remain on these lines into the autumn of 1944, briefly engaging German troops withdrawing into Lapland following the Finnish surrender. Karelia was now a strategic dead end, and in November 19th Army was removed to the Reserve of the Supreme High Command for reassignment of its units to the south. The division was first assigned 2nd Ukrainian Front in Romania, and then to 26th Army in 3rd Ukrainian Front for operations in Hungary. It arrived south of Budapest in mid-January 1945 and was quickly involved in the last German effort to relieve its besieged garrison. After helping to defeat the last German offensive in March it advanced, now with 57th Army, through the Hungarian oil fields. It was disbanded soon after the German surrender.

== Formation ==
The division was formed during March - June 1939 in and near Murmansk on an altered establishment as a mountain rifle division. The cadre was the 162nd Rifle Regiment of the 54th Rifle Division. The mountain establishment was chosen due to the lack of roads in the high Arctic, making the movement of heavy weapons difficult or impossible. Kombrig Vladimir Ivanovich Shcherbakov was immediately appointed as commander, with Col. Ivan Ivanovich Vnukov as chief of staff. The division completed its formation on June 30 and in early September deployed to Titovka, the Sredny Peninsula and the Rybachy Peninsula for further training.

=== Winter War ===
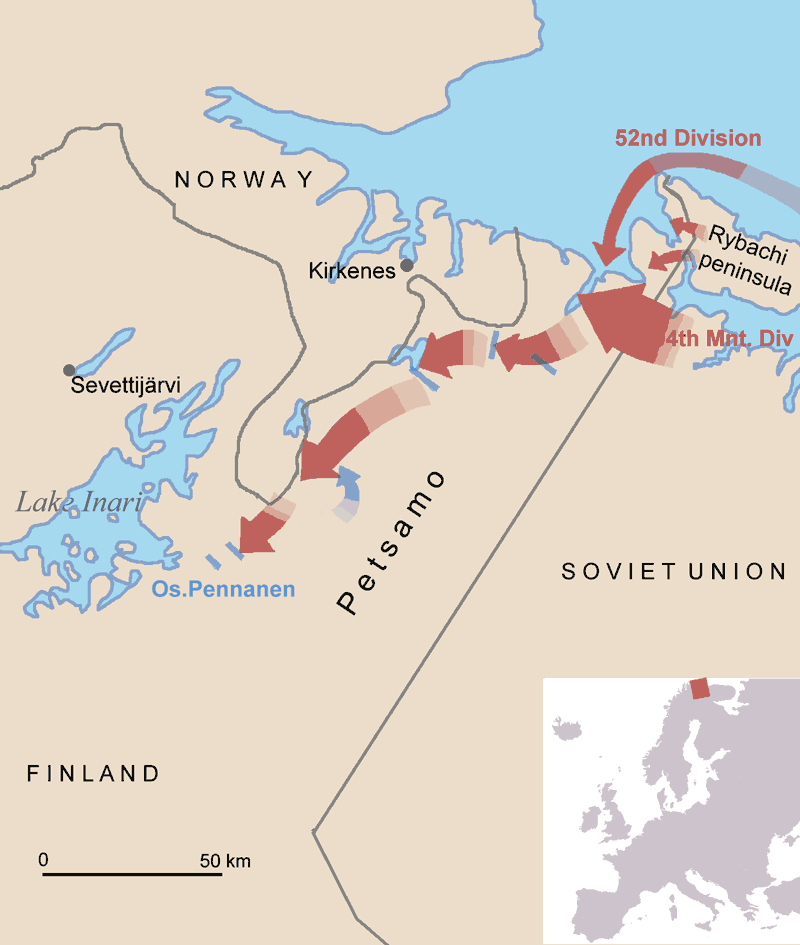
Petsamo campaign. Note advance of the 104th.

The invasion of Finland began on November 30. The Finnish command had not expected any large scale attacks between Kitelä and Petsamo due to the extreme winter weather and the lack of roads. The defenders initially consisted of the 10th Separate Company (10.Er.K) in Parkkina and the 5th Separate Battery (5.Er.Ptri, four 76mm field cannons, from year 1887) in Liinahamari; half of the shells for these guns would prove to be duds. In comparison, the 14th Army deployed three divisions, the 104th, 52nd, and 14th Rifle Divisions, although the latter would simply occupy the Liinahamari harbor area. This move was largely to prevent any landing by Britain or France in support of the Finns.

The 104th quickly occupied the Finnish part of the Rybachy Peninsula and on December 1 its 242nd Mountain Rifle Regiment took Parkkina. The attack on Petsamo was mostly by land but included landings by sea supported by naval gunfire of the White Sea Fleet and coastal artillery on the approaches to Murmansk. From here the division was intended to advance along the Finnish Arctic Highway toward the capital of Lapland, Rovaniemi, which was to be taken by December 12. This plan seemed reasonable, given a numerical advantage of some 42 to one. Given the remoteness from any Finnish population centers and the proximity of Murmansk there was no prospect of defending Petsamo. The defenders were part of the Lapland Group, under command of Maj. Gen. K. M. Wallenius. His troops had no alternative but to retreat south and carry out delaying actions as the flat and treeless terrain offered few defensive positions. The main hope was that even more severe weather would slow or stop the advance. Meanwhile, a "scorched earth" campaign was carried out to destroy or carry off anything that might provide shelter, warmth, or sustenance to the 104th.

As the advance began on December 3 two junior leaders of the 14th Rifle Division's 95th Rifle Regiment, which was attached to the 104th, distinguished themselves in the battle for Luostari. Lt. Pavel Fyodorovich Porosenkov was in the company led by Lieutenant Golovin in the regiment's first echelon. After coming under machine gun fire from a fortified position Porosenkov used a DP-28 light machine gun to suppress or destroy it, after which the company continued to advance. During an attack near a monastery near Luostari, while Porosenkov was leading his squad, the company captured three Finnish artillery pieces and two heavy machine guns. This led to counterattacks by superior forces. Political instructor Vladimir Dmitrievich Kapustin was now in command of the company and formed a perimeter defense on Hill 260.0. Despite two wounds he led several bayonet charges, but was later captured and stabbed to death. Porosenkov now took command of the remaining 24 men and maintained the partly encircled position while sending a messenger to the rear for reinforcements. These eventually arrived and Luostari was taken. The 95th was now moved back to the Rybachy for the duration of the war. Porosenkov and Kapustin were both made Heroes of the Soviet Union on February 5, 1940. Porosenkov went on to serve in the 322nd Rifle Division during the Soviet-German War but was severely wounded in March 1942 and had both legs amputated. He died on January 3, 1976.

The advance slowed in the cold, including gale-force blizzards, and perpetual darkness where the men of the 104th rarely saw an opponent but faced sniper fire from men who had hunted in this terrain for decades. Their supply line became more vulnerable with each kilometre. By January 1940 the road to Petsamo was only being kept open by regular patrols by light tanks and armored cars between blockhouses that had been established every 8km. The division finally reached the tiny village of Nautsi, close to the border with Norway, but could go no farther. Furthermore, while the 122nd Rifle Division had taken Salla in early December on its way to link up with the 104th at Rovaniemi, it had been counterattacked and forced back by the Lapland Group, effectively halting the entire Soviet effort in Lapland. Shcherbakov's troops remained stretched out along the Arctic Highway until after the ceasefire on March 13, and as part of the peace settlement withdrew to Petsamo and the Rybachy, which remained in Soviet hands.

== Continuation War ==
Shcherbakov had his rank modernized to major general on June 4, and soon after his division was officially redesignated as the 104th Rifle Division. He remained in command until January 17, 1941, when he left to take command of 50th Rifle Corps in the Karelian Isthmus. After leading the 42nd and 8th Armies in late summer he was wounded, but returned to command 14th Army from March 1942 into the postwar, becoming a lieutenant general on April 28, 1943. He was replaced by Maj. Gen. Stepan Ilich Morozov, who had previously served as a military advisor in China and as an instructor at the Frunze Military Academy.

At the time of the German invasion of the USSR the 104th and 122nd Divisions formed the 42nd Rifle Corps of 14th Army under Northern Front. The 104th's order of battle was as follows:

- 217th Rifle Regiment
- 242nd Rifle Regiment
- 273rd Rifle Regiment
- 290th Artillery Regiment
- 502nd Howitzer Artillery Regiment (until October 14, 1941)
- 161st Antitank Battalion
- 391st Antiaircraft Battery (later 359th Antiaircraft Battalion, until May 29, 1943)
- 369th Mortar Battalion (from October 14, 1941 until November 9, 1942)
- 163rd Reconnaissance Battalion (later 163rd Company)
- 276th Sapper Battalion
- 234th Signal Battalion (later 831st Signal Company)
- 352nd Medical/Sanitation Battalion
- 25th Chemical Defense (Anti-gas) Platoon
- 202nd Motor Transport Company (later 161st)
- 171st Field Bakery (later 183rd Motorized Field Bakery)
- 243rd Divisional Veterinary Hospital
- 26th Divisional Artillery Workshop
- 280th Field Postal Station (later 52555th)
- 194th Field Office of the State Bank

The division was positioned near Kestenga, covering the secondary route to Kandalaksha. It was manned and equipped with 8,373 personnel, 8,959 rifles, 360 light machine guns, 156 heavy machine guns, 64 45mm antitank guns, 33 76mm cannons and howitzers, 34 122mm howitzers, 12 152mm howitzers, 141 mortars of all calibres, 127 wheeled motor vehicles and 50 tractors, plus 1,766 horses.

=== Operation Arctic Fox ===
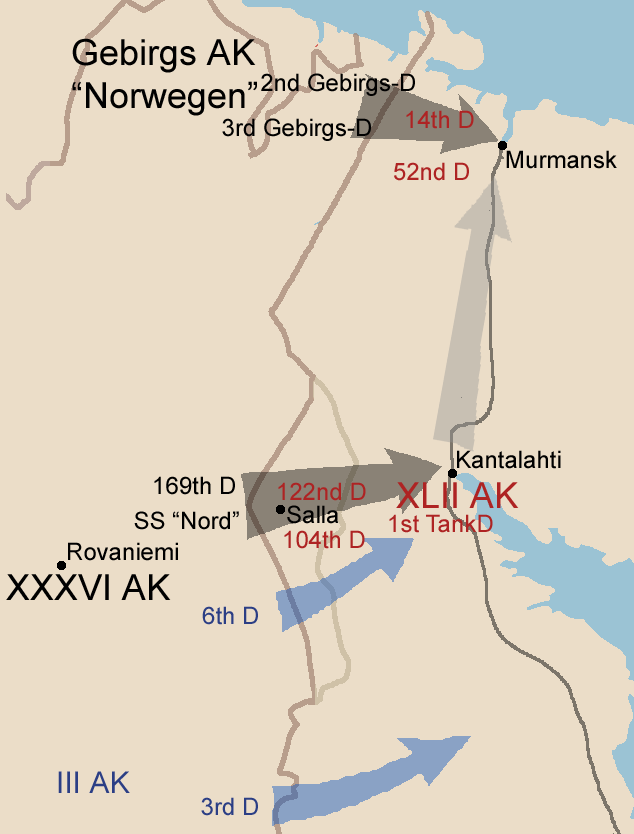
Operations Arctic Fox (south) and Platinum Fox (north)

During August 1940 the Finnish government permitted German troops to enter its country. In April 1941 Hitler ordered Gen. E. Dietl to Berlin to plan operations in the Murmansk region. Hitler's preferred option was to attack Murmansk directly, a distance of some 100km from Petsamo. Dietl, who was familiar with the arctic tundra of the area, expressed grave doubts, and proposed an alternative plan to attack farther south via Salla to Kandalaksha, where the terrain was less extreme and there were at least a few roads and railways. In the event, Hitler's plan would be implemented as Operation Platinum Fox, while Dietl's would proceed as Operation Arctic Fox (also translated as Polar Fox).

Lt. Gen. H. Feige was delegated to command Arctic Fox. His force consisted of the XXXVI Mountain Corps, consisting of the 169th Infantry Division and SS Battlegroup Nord, as well as the Finnish 6th Infantry Division. The German force numbered roughly 40,600, with the Finns contributing another 12,000. 42nd Corps had some 20,000 effectives, spread across a broad front, with the 104th to the south and the 122nd to the north. Nord, largely composed of 8,000 former police and security men, was well equipped, including a battalion of light tanks, but highly deficient in training and experience. Feige planned an advance on four axes: one German regiment would attack on the direct road to Salla; two regiments would strike from the north; Nord would push from the south; and the 6th Division would attempt to reach the Soviet rear from a position 80km to the south.

The operation began on July 1 and immediately ran into trouble. The northern force gained about 5km through the forest against the 122nd, but the frontal attack was halted just 500m across the front line and then thrown back by a counterattack. Nord did even worse, with many men becoming demoralized as soon as they came under fire; the Soviet command soon left them to their own devices and concentrated to the center and north. The fighting continued for three days, and toward the end a forest fire began in the summer heat, leaving XXXVI Corps struggling to hold its meagre gains. On July 4 the regiment on the road managed to break the first line of defenses, but Nord was routed. Panicked SS men poured down the road to Kemijärvi, believing that Soviet tanks were on their heels. Casualties were relatively minor, but Feige was forced to appeal for more reliable troops. These arrived on July 6 in the form of about a third of the 163rd Infantry Division and helped to capture Salla after two days of heavy fighting. 42nd Corps lost some 50 tanks and a good deal of heavy artillery.

In the course of this fighting another man of the 104th became a Hero of the Soviet Union. Jr. Sgt. Aleksandr Matveevich Gryaznov and Krasnoarmeets A. S. Ignatov, both of the 163rd Reconnaissance Battalion, formed the crew of a T-37A tank. On July 6 they were on outpost duty near the village of Mikola. Coming under attack from Finnish forces the tank was immobilized and the two men resisted with their single machine gun and grenades. When they ran out of ammunition they were rushed by the Finns, who piled brushwood on the vehicle in an effort to set it on fire. The crew used their remaining RPG-40 grenade the blow up the tank from inside, killing themselves and about nine of their attackers. On July 22 Gryaznov was posthumously awarded the Gold Star, while Ignatov received the Order of Lenin.

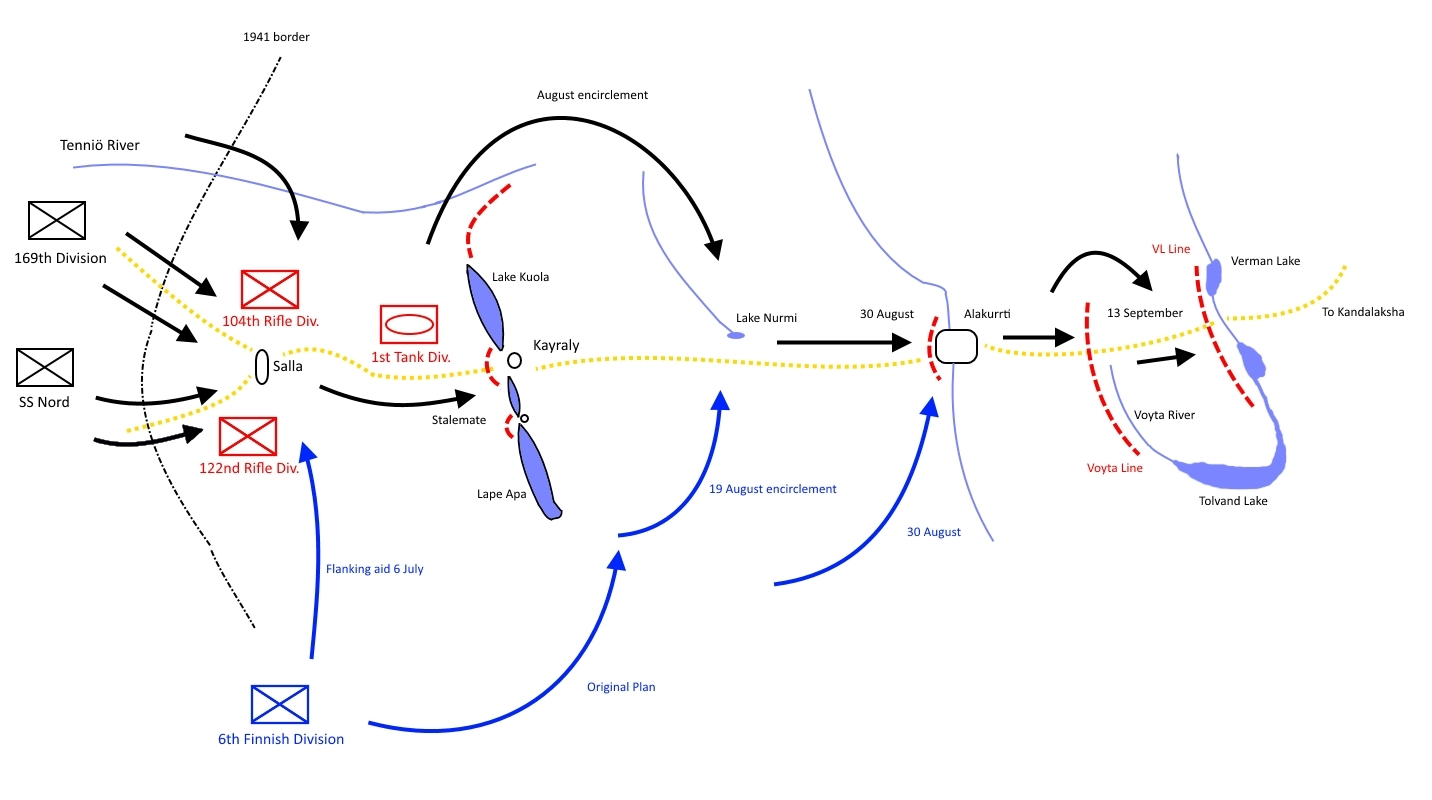
Operations from Salla to VL Line

After the fall of Salla the 42nd Corps dropped back 16km to the village of Kayrala, which had lakes covering the flanks to the north and south. Here the 104th and 122nd received some 20,000 reinforcements and replacements and dug in. Feige made a pair of frontal attacks, but these were easily defeated. He now decided to make a flanking move around the northern lake, while 6th Division advanced around the southern lake. The northern approach would require building a road through forest and peat bogs, and this proceeded slowly. Col. Gen. P. N. von Falkenhorst, commander of Army Lapland, arrived on July 23 to urge more energetic action. Feige promised to attack on July 26 and this went ahead at 2300 hours, but gains were minimal. He appealed for more troops, but this was denied, and XXXVI Corps halted its offensive on July 30. Only minor combat ensued over the next weeks.

Meanwhile, the Finnish III Corps, pushing toward Loukhi, had advanced some 65km into Soviet territory by July 18, reaching Kestenga by August 7, about 65km short of cutting the Murmansk railroad. A assortment of Red Army troops delayed the drive for three weeks until the arrival of the 88th Rifle Division from Arkhangelsk, and the Finns halted on August 25. The next day a task force based on the 1st Battalion of the 273rd Rifle Regiment, under command of the regimental chief of staff, Maj. Aleksei Kirillovich Kuznetsov, was tasked with holding defensive positions some 6km west of Alakurtti until elements of the 122nd and the 1st Motorized Rifle Regiment could reach the east bank of the Tuntsayoki River. On the morning of August 28 Kuznetsov's force was attacked by two Finnish battalions and by noon it was outflanked on the right, cutting its route to the rear. By now Kuznetsov had received orders to disengage. He formed a squad of about 12 men to cover the breakout and retreat of his surviving soldiers with machine gun fire; his squad gradually lost strength until he was killed as the last man standing. He would be made a Hero of the Soviet Union on February 22, 1943. On the same day General Morozov took command of 42nd Corps, and after this was disbanded he led Operational Group Kandalaksha and later 19th Army. He was replaced by Colonel Vnukov until October 29, when he in turn was replaced by Col. Georgii Andreevich Zhukov. This NKVD officer had been in command of border troops since December 1939 and would be promoted to major general on September 1, 1943.

During August the outflanking drive around Lake Kuola finally got underway and 42nd Corps fell back to Alakurtti by August 30. A final Axis effort in early September pushed the 104th back 4km east of Alakurtti, where it established a solid front that would hold into 1944. Campaigning season was by now over, and XXXVI Corps was stopped well short of Kandalaksha. On October 14, 42nd Corps was disbanded and the division came under direct command of 14th Army, as part of the Kandalaksha Operational Group.

==== Defense of the Arctic ====
The front remained static through 1942 and 1943. In January 1942 the 104th was converted to the shtat (table of organization and equipment) of December 6, 1941, and lost its howitzer regiment, while its reconnaissance and antiaircraft battalions were reduced in size. On April 4, 1942, the army boundaries of Karelian Front were changed, and the 104th came under command of 19th Army. As another winter approached the division raised a ski battalion from its own assets, and by February 1944 it had a strength of 400-450 personnel in two rifle companies, a mortar company with 50mm and 82mm pieces, plus antitank rifle, reconnaissance, and signal platoons. On February 22, 1943, in belated recognition of their success in the defense of Kandalaksha, the 242nd Rifle and 290th Artillery Regiments were both awarded the Order of the Red Banner.

By early 1944 the reduced establishment of the division gave each rifle battalion just two companies, with a platoon of sub-machine gunners in each company. At the regimental level the support elements were as of the regular shtat, except the signalers had twice the usual number of radios, and also employed a section of eight German Shepherd messenger dogs, both due to the long defensive fronts and the roadless Arctic terrain. The 161st Antitank Battalion remained entirely equipped with 45mm pieces into 1945, as the Axis did not deploy tanks in the Arctic. By the start of 1944, with the exception of the ski battalion, all 50mm mortars had been removed from service because "the weapons were worthless in deep snow."

=== Return to Salla ===
On September 1, 1944, the 104th joined the 67th Rifle Division to form the 133rd Rifle Corps. The Vyborg–Petrozavodsk offensive in June and July had forced a change of government in Helsinki by mid-August and on August 29 the government in Moscow agreed to accept an armistice delegation on two conditions: Finland must cease relations with Germany immediately; and all German forces must be evacuated or interned by September 15. Although the OKW had been making contingency plans since summer the decision still came as a surprise. Their forces in northern Finland, including XXXVI Mountain Corps, were now grouped into 20th Mountain Army, and this began Operation Birke on September 6. 19th Army had extended its north flank during the spring, unknown to XXXVI Corps, soon cutting its main line of retreat. The German force was obliged to switch to an alternative route which it had also prepared. In addition, 19th Army had managed to move a group of T-34 tanks through the wilderness, all unknown to XXXVI Corps, which was struck deep on its flank. This proved more of a psychological than a practical blow. The Army followed up as far as the 1940 border and stopped. On September 28 General Zhukov was moved to command of the 127th Mountain Rifle Corps and was replaced in command of the 104th by Col. Ignatii Alekseevich Moskalev until October 11 when this officer was in turn replaced by Col. Ivan Vasilevich Obydenkin, who would lead it into peacetime.

== Siege of Budapest ==
On November 14 the 104th, with most of 19th Army, entered the Reserve of the Supreme High Command for redeployment to a more active front. Loading onto the railway it had defended for so long it moved far to the south, arriving at Ploiești on December 2, remaining in 133rd Corps under direct command of 2nd Ukrainian Front. The Corps also contained the 122nd and 21st Rifle Divisions.

On December 26 the 2nd and 3rd Ukrainian Fronts completed the encirclement of some 70,000 German and Hungarian troops within Budapest. On January 1, 1945, the IV SS Panzer Corps launched Operation Konrad I in an effort to break through to the garrison, but this was stopped near Bicske. The second effort, Konrad II, began on January 7, and was also halted short of the city. At this time 133rd Corps was moving up from the south, concentrating at Dunapentele by January 18, just as Konrad III was underway. For this effort IV SS was joined by III Panzer Corps attacking from the south near Székesfehérvár.

=== Operation Konrad III ===
By the end of the day the 252nd Rifle Division had suffered heavy casualties while retreating to the Sarviz Canal near Szentvendel, while elements of the 1st Guards Fortified Region and two brigades of 7th Mechanized Corps had been encircled. To restore the situation the commander of 3rd Ukrainian Front, Marshal F. I. Tolbukhin, decided to commit the 133rd Corps and 18th Tank Corps into the area of the breakthrough. By dusk the 133rd reached a 2km-wide sector on the east bank of the Sarviz southeast of Falubattyan and entered combat with forward elements of III Panzer in Sárkeresztúr, with 18th Tanks in support. The 122nd and 21st took up a line from Tac to Kirp, 2km south of Nagylang, while the 104th was moved to the vicinity of Sashalom–Petele–outside Seregélyes.

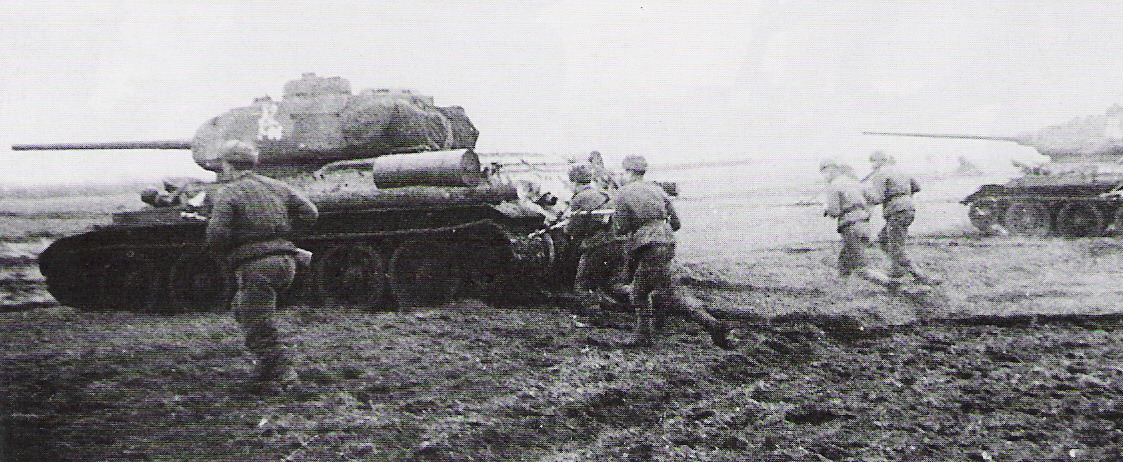
Counterattacking T34-85s of 18th Tank Corps with supporting infantry near the Danube

By 0100 hours on January 19 all bridges over the Sarviz had been destroyed, and all crossing points were under fire from Soviet artillery. Despite this, overnight III Panzer prepared crossing operations. The situation of the Budapest garrison was growing desperate as Pest had been taken. By 0900 both 133rd Rifle and 18th Tank Corps were involved in heavy fighting with superior German forces but managed to hold the line Seregélyes–Sárosd. The panzers now maneuvered around the flanks of 18th Tanks and reached the Danube on a sector from Adony to Dunapentele, splitting the Front's southern group from its northern group and pocketing most of both Corps. The commander of 18th Tanks received orders from Tolbukhin to break out to the south and take up a line from Alap to Dunapentele. 133rd Corps was resubordinated to 4th Guards Army at 0600 on January 20.

The breakout began overnight on January 21/22 in the direction of Hercegfalva. The force was operating along two axes: to the right was 181st Tank Brigade, 21st Rifle and part of the 122nd, along with the 10th Antitank Brigade, attempting to move on Alap and Sárkeresztúr; to the left the 110th Tank Brigade, 104th Rifle, plus the rest of 18th Tanks pushed toward Sárosd and Hercegfalva. The operation was successful as the blocking units of 3rd Panzer Division were shoved aside near Hercegfalva and the two Corps took up their new line, facing north. Over the next two days III Panzer made repeated efforts to break the Soviet lines and get into the rear of 57th Army without success, finally going over to the defense and redeploying near Adony for a new attack toward Baracska. This began overnight on January 25/26 with over 100 armored vehicles, including heavy tanks and self-propelled guns and managed to gain 10km in depth while also widening the penetration to 5km. This proved to be the high tide mark of Konrad as Soviet resistance pushed the German force over to the defense. 133rd Corps consolidated under 3rd Ukrainian Front's 26th Army and was reinforced on January 28, with orders to force the Sarviz. The Front attacked at noon on January 31 and gradually drove the Axis forces back to the Margit-Line from Lake Balaton to the Danube by February 13, when Budapest finally fell.

=== Operation Spring Awakening ===
Following the failure of the Ardennes Offensive in January the 6th Panzer Army was withdrawn and began moving east. The commander of Army Group South, Gen. O. A. W. Wöhler submitted four outlines to Hitler on February 22, dubbed Frühlingserwachen, designed to use this reserve to create a buffer that would protect the Nagykanizsa oil fields. The operation began at midnight on March 5; I SS Panzer Corps was ready at dawn to move west of the Sarviz Canal, but II SS Panzer Corps on the east side was 24 hours late. 3rd Ukrainian Front was well aware of the German buildup, which had taken more than a month. The offensive made poor progress and the Front counterattacked on the afternoon of March 16, and during the night of March 21/22 Székesfehérvár was retaken. At about this time the 104th was transferred to 57th Army, where it was assigned to 6th Guards Rifle Corps. It would remain in this Army for the duration of the war, returning to 133rd Corps in the final weeks.

== Postwar ==
Beginning on March 26 the division took part in the operation that captured the Hungarian oil fields. Under the terms of the decree that created the Southern Group of Forces from 3rd Ukrainian Front on June 15 the 104th is listed as one of the divisions to be "disbanded in place". It was accordingly disbanded in Romania in July. Colonel Obydenkin had left the division on May 16 to become deputy commander of the 74th Rifle Division. In December he was appointed to a regimental command in the 68th Guards Rifle Division, but this was disbanded in June 1946 and Obydenkin was released into the reserves. He died in Rybinsk on April 13, 1954.
