= 122nd Rifle Division =

122nd Rifle Division (September 5, 1939 – July 1945)
- Active: 1939–1945
- Country: Soviet Union
- Branch: Red Army (1939-46)
- Type: Infantry
- Size: Division
- Engagements: Winter War; Battle of Salla (1939); Continuation War; Operation Arctic Fox; Defense of the Arctic; Siege of Budapest; Operation Konrad; Operation Spring Awakening; Vienna offensive Nagykanizsa–Körmend offensive
- Decorations: Order of Kutuzov

Commanders
- Notable commanders: Maj. Gen. Pyotr Semyonovich Shevchenko; Col. Nikolai Nikolaevich Meshcheryakov; Maj. Gen. Vasilii Nikolaevich Molozhaev; Col. Grigorii Fyodorovich Perepich; Maj. Gen. Aleksei Nikonovich Velichko

The 122nd Rifle Division was formed as an infantry division of the Red Army on September 5, 1939, in the Oryol Military District, based on the shtat (table of organization and equipment) of that month. It was quickly moved west to the Byelorussian Military District but was still barely formed at the start of the Soviet invasion of Poland, and did not see combat. It was soon moved to North Karelia, where it took part in the Winter War as part of 9th Army. After capturing and pushing beyond the town of Salla it was forced to retreat back nearly to Märkäjärvi by Finnish counterattacks, and remained there for the duration. It was still in this region at the start of the Continuation War, now as part of the 14th Army of Northern Front (soon Karelian Front). At the start July 1941 the German XXXVI Mountain Corps launched an offensive against the 122nd and its Corps-mate, the 104th Rifle Division, with the objective of reaching Kandalaksha and cutting the railway from Murmansk to the rest of the USSR. The divisions conducted a successful retrograde action over the following months, holding the German/Finnish forces well short of the railway when the offensive ended in September. In April 1942 both divisions were transferred to 19th Army. The 122nd would remain on these lines into the autumn of 1944, briefly engaging German troops withdrawing into Lapland following the Finnish surrender. Karelia was now a strategic dead end, and in November 19th Army was removed to the Reserve of the Supreme High Command for reassignment of its units to the south. The division was first assigned 2nd Ukrainian Front in Romania, and then to 26th Army in 3rd Ukrainian Front for operations in Hungary. It arrived south of Budapest in mid-January 1945 and was quickly involved in the last German effort to relieve its besieged garrison. After helping to defeat the last German offensive in March it advanced, now with 57th Army, through the Hungarian oil fields, winning the Order of Kutuzov on the way toward Vienna. It was disbanded soon after the German surrender.

== Formation ==
The 122nd began forming in the Oryol Military District on September 5, 1939, based on a regiment of the 6th Rifle Division. Kombrig Pyotr Semyonovich Shevchenko was assigned to command on that date; he had previously led the 76th Mountain Rifle Division. It was barely formed up when it began moving east by rail to the Byelorussian Military District, which became Belorussian Front at the start of the invasion of Poland on September 17. While it was assigned to 24th Rifle Corps of 4th Army it was not yet operational. Following the Polish surrender the 122nd was moved again, now to North Karelia where it joined the 9th Army at Kandalaksha on November 8 in preparation for the invasion of Finland on November 30. Its major units were the 420th, 596th, and 715th Rifle Regiments, plus the 285th Artillery and 369th Howitzer Regiments.

=== Battle of Salla ===
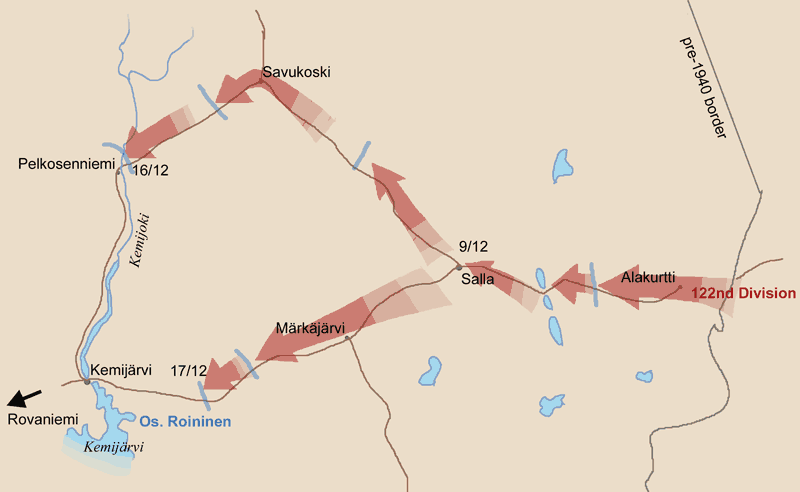
Battle of Salla, 1st Phase

Unknown to the Finns, the Soviets had built a railway from Kandalaksha to the frontier earlier in the year using prisoner labor. By December 1 the division was developing a direct attack on Salla from its base at Kandalaksha with the support of the 88th Rifle Division if needed. The intermediate objective was the town of Kemijärvi en route to Rovaniemi, the capital of Lapland. Here the 122nd was expected to join hands with the 104th Rifle Division, driving south from Petsamo. In the event the 104th would never cover half that distance, but the 122nd briefly seemed poised to do the job alone.

The division had several companies of tanks attached, and these operated more aggressively than those on most other sectors. Furthermore, just beyond the frontier the terrain transitioned from heavy forest to tundra, which offered the armor more scope for deployment. The strength of the division was completely unexpected by the Finnish command, which believed it would see nothing more than raiding parties and reconnaissance units on the sector. It was forced to dig up odds and ends of reinforcements for Lapland Group's Separate Battalion 17 and its one attached company. Shevchenko's troops captured Salla on December 9, from where he divided his forces. A northern grouping of one rifle regiment, the reconnaissance battalion, plus a company of medium tanks, took the road to Pelkosenniemi, which in turn led to Sodankylä. If the latter was reached the Finns on the Petsamo front would have their supply line cut. The southern grouping, consisting of the balance of the division, continued moving on Kemijärvi.

During the advance on Salla two officers of the division would distinguish themselves. Maj. Stepan Terentievich Kazakov was in command of the 596th Rifle Regiment. On December 2 he led a flanking attack near the village of Kuolajärvi which pushed the Finns off a dominant height. Overnight on December 6/7 he also led his regiment in a river crossing which established a bridgehead, personally directing artillery fire against counterattacks. He would be killed in action on December 20. Meanwhile, Cpt. Ivan Ivanovich Kozmin was serving as commander of a battalion of the 420th Rifle Regiment. On December 9 he led a group of his riflemen, riding on tanks, east of the village of Kuolojärvi, an attack that dispersed a planned Finnish ambush. The battalion took the village later that day. On December 31 Kozmin was in command of a reconnaissance group when he killed seven Finnish soldiers in a dugout, took one prisoner, and captured a heavy machine gun. He would be killed in action on January 4, 1940. Both men would be buried in a mass grave at Alakurtti, and both would be posthumously made Heroes of the Soviet Union on May 21.

=== Second phase ===
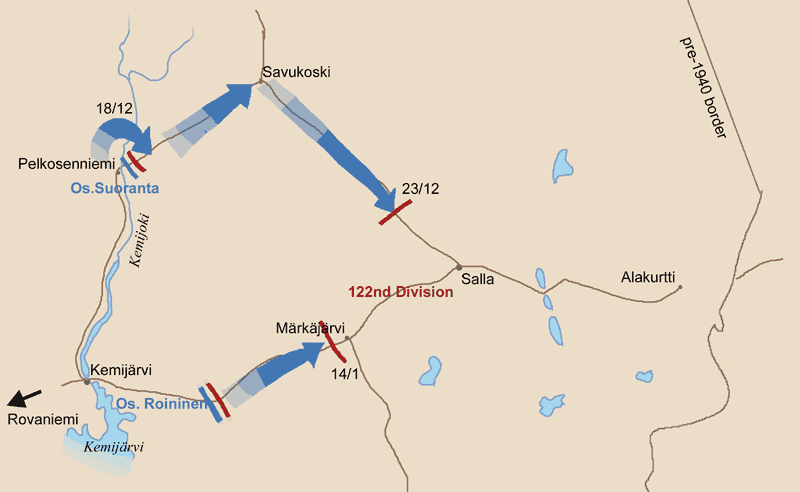
Battle of Salla, 2nd Phase

By December 17 the 122nd was less than 30km from Kemijärvi. Maj. Gen. K. M. Wallenius, commander of the Lapland Group, now decided to take personal command of the defense. His forces had been augmented up to seven battalions, although four of them were equipped with not much more than rifles. He decided to first strike back against the northern grouping. Overnight it was outflanked by a battalion that managed to approach within 100m of the regiment's lines without being detected. The Finns charged out of the darkness, firing as they moved, and quickly routed the regiment, which abandoned much of its heavy equipment and several vehicles. This retreat continued for some 90km and the northern grouping was effectively out of the battle.

Following this success Wallenius was able to reinforce the line in front of Kemijärvi. The 122nd's southern grouping had already lost some 600 men killed in a twelve-hour battle. Over the next week Shevchenko launched repeated attacks at battalion strength, usually two or three each day. The Finns employed effective camouflage, and regularly held their fire until the range was 150m or less. One company made two such attacks in one day and was finally reduced to just 38 men. Elements of the 88th now began arriving, being thrown in piecemeal, but with no better results. By the end of the month both the 88th and 122nd were spent as attacking forces, and were hard pressed to hold their earlier gains.

Roughly a third of the Soviet troops were tied up guarding a 145km-long supply line when Wallenius went over to the counterattack on January 2, 1940. He began with a series of short, concentrated strikes, throwing the two divisions off balance; when resistance stiffened the Finns withdrew to attack elsewhere. Gradually the Soviet force withdrew to a series of ridge lines some 3km west of Märkäjärvi where they had prepared a strong defensive line. There the 122nd and 88th went to ground, remaining there for the duration of the war. In the peace settlement of March 12 the occupied Finnish territory was ceded to the USSR, and the 122nd remained there until July 1941. Shevchenko had his rank modernized to that of major general on June 4, 1940.

== Continuation War ==
At the time of the German invasion of the USSR the 122nd and 104th Divisions formed the 42nd Rifle Corps of 14th Army under Northern Front. Shevchenko remained in command. its order of battle was as follows:

- 420th Rifle Regiment
- 596th Rifle Regiment
- 715th Rifle Regiment
- 285th Artillery Regiment
- 369th Howitzer Artillery Regiment (until October 20, 1941)
- 208th Antitank Battalion
- 392nd Antiaircraft Battery (later 252nd Antiaircraft Battalion, until June 10, 1943)
- 370th Mortar Battalion (from November 20, 1941 until November 9, 1942)
- 153rd Reconnaissance Company (later 153rd Battalion)
- 223rd Sapper Battalion
- 256th Signal Battalion (later 799th Signal Company)
- 172nd Medical/Sanitation Battalion
- 126th Chemical Defense (Anti-gas) Platoon
- 205th Motor Transport Company (later 193rd Battalion)
- 320th Field Bakery (later 123rd, 80th)
- 42nd Divisional Veterinary Hospital
- 36th Divisional Artillery Workshop
- 114th Field Postal Station
- 195th Field Office of the State Bank

The division was covering a front from Korya to Lampela near the new border with Finland, holding the direct route to Kandalaksha. When Finland declared war on June 25 the division had a total of roughly 7,000 officers and men on strength (the prewar "6" division shtat) and its heavy equipment consisted of 30 45mm antitank guns, 21 76mm cannons, 27 122mm and 12 152mm howitzers, eight 37mm and four 76mm antiaircraft guns. The division also had the 107th Tank Battalion attached from the 1st Tank Division at Kandalaksha.

=== Operation Arctic Fox ===
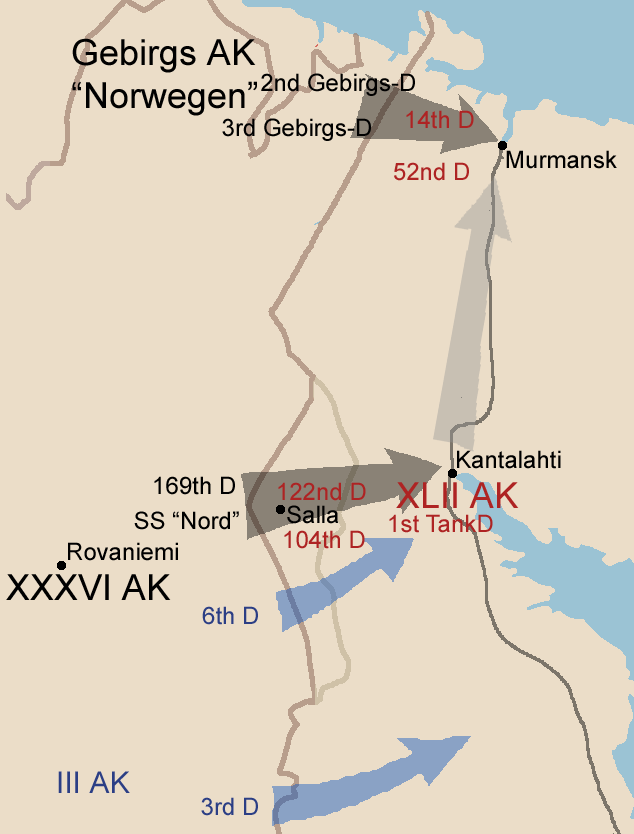
Operations Arctic Fox (south) and Platinum Fox (north)

During August 1940 the Finnish government permitted German troops to enter its country. In April 1941 Hitler ordered Gen. E. Dietl to Berlin to plan operations in the Murmansk region. Hitler's preferred option was to attack Murmansk directly, a distance of some 100km from Petsamo. Dietl, who was familiar with the arctic tundra of the area, expressed grave doubts, and proposed an alternative plan to attack farther south via Salla to Kandalaksha, where the terrain was less extreme and there were at least a few roads and railways. In the event, Hitler's plan would be implemented as Operation Platinum Fox, while Dietl's would proceed as Operation Arctic Fox (also translated as Polar Fox).

Lt. Gen. H. Feige was delegated to command Arctic Fox. His force consisted of the XXXVI Mountain Corps, consisting of the 169th Infantry Division and SS Battlegroup Nord, as well as the Finnish 6th Infantry Division. The German force numbered roughly 40,600, with the Finns contributing another 12,000. 42nd Corps had some 20,000 effectives, spread across a broad front, with the 122nd to the north and the 104th to the south. Nord, largely composed of 8,000 former police and security men, was well equipped, including a battalion of light tanks, but highly deficient in training and experience. Feige planned an advance on four axes: one German regiment would attack on the direct road to Salla; two regiments would strike from the north; Nord would push from the south; and the 6th Division would attempt to reach the Soviet rear from a position 80km to the south.

The operation began on July 1 and immediately ran into trouble. The northern force gained about 5km through the forest against the 122nd, but the frontal attack was halted just 500m across the front line and then thrown back by a counterattack. Nord did even worse, with many men becoming demoralized as soon as they came under fire; the Soviet command soon left them to their own devices and concentrated to the center and north. The fighting continued for three days, and toward the end a forest fire began in the summer heat, leaving XXXVI Corps struggling to hold its meagre gains. On July 4 the regiment on the road managed to break the first line of defenses, but Nord was routed. Panicked SS men poured down the road to Kemijärvi, believing that Soviet tanks were on their heels. Casualties were relatively minor, but Feige was forced to appeal for more reliable troops. These arrived on July 6 and helped to capture Salla after two days of heavy fighting. 42nd Corps lost some 50 tanks and a good deal of heavy artillery.

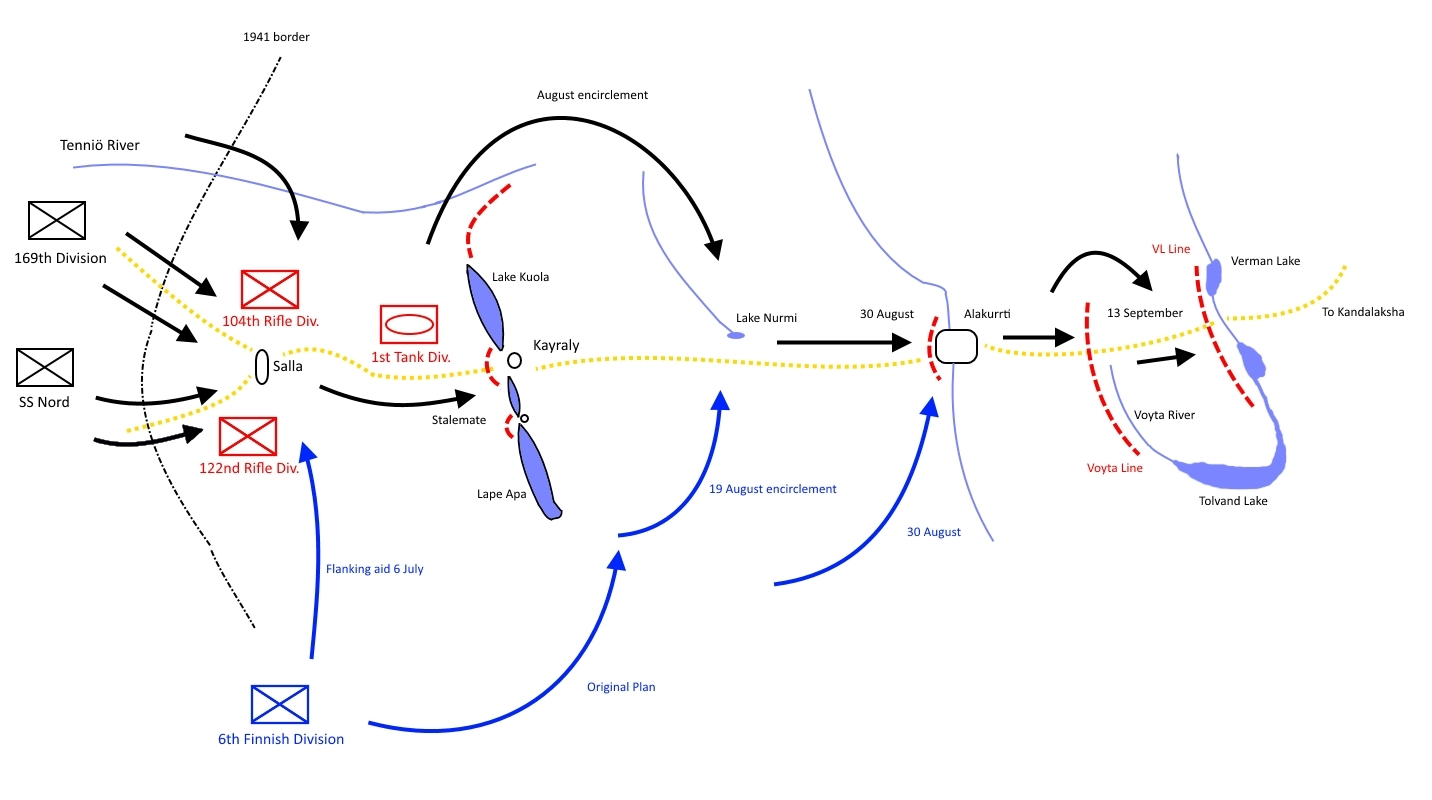
Operations from Salla to VL Line

After the fall of Salla the 42nd Corps dropped back 16km to the village of Kayrala, which had lakes covering the flanks to the north and south. Here the 122nd and 104th received some 20,000 reinforcements and replacements and dug in. Feige made a pair of frontal attacks, but these were easily defeated. He now decided to make a flanking move around the northern lake, while 6th Division advanced around the southern lake. The northern approach would require building a road through forest and peat bogs, and this proceeded slowly. Col. Gen. P. N. von Falkenhorst, commander of Army Lapland, arrived on July 23 to urge more energetic action. Feige promised to attack on July 26 and this went ahead at 2300 hours, but gains were minimal. He appealed for more troops, but this was denied, and XXXVI Corps halted its offensive on July 30. Only minor combat ensued over the next weeks.

Meanwhile, the Finnish III Corps, pushing toward Loukhi, had advanced some 65km into Soviet territory by July 18, reaching Kestenga by August 7, about 65km short of cutting the Murmansk railroad. A assortment of Red Army troops delayed the drive for three weeks until the arrival of the 88th Division from Arkhangelsk, and the Finns halted on August 25. During August the outflanking drive around Lake Kuola finally got underway and 42nd Corps fell back to Alakurtti by August 30. On August 28 General Shevchenko was moved to Corps command and was replaced on August 31 by Col. Nikolai Nikolaevich Meshcheryakov, who had previously served with the 104th. Shevchenko would go on to lead the 213th Rifle Division. A final Axis effort in early September pushed the 122nd back to the Voyta River and then to a defile between Verman Lake and Tolvand Lake by September 13. Campaigning season was by now over, and XXXVI Corps was stopped well short of Kandalaksha. On October 14, 42nd Corps was disbanded and the division came under direct command of 14th Army, as part of what was designated as the Kandalaksha Operational Group.

==== Defense of the Arctic ====
The front remained static through 1942 and 1943. On April 4, 1942, the army boundaries of Karelian Front were changed, and the 122nd came under command of 19th Army. In common with all divisions of this Front a ski battalion was formed from its own resources; by 1944 this consisted of three rifle companies of 90-100 men each, a mortar company, plus antitank rifle and reconnaissance platoons. Colonel Meshcheryakov was seriously wounded on March 23, 1943, and evacuated to hospital. After release he was promoted to major general on June 3, 1944, and soon took command of the 136th Rifle Division for about six weeks before permanently leaving the front for further treatment. Col. Vasilii Nikolaevich Molozhaev took over the 122nd, concurrently serving as deputy commander of the 17th Guards Rifle Corps, and was promoted to major general on May 18, but left for command of the 271st Rifle Division on August 9. The division now passed to Col. Grigorii Fyodorovich Perepich until February 12, 1944, when he was replaced by Col. Aleksei Nikonovich Velichko. This officer had been in command of the 1st Tyumen Military Infantry School from late December 1941 until being sent to the Voroshilov Academy in June 1943. He would be promoted to the rank of major general on November 2, 1944.

=== Return to Salla ===
On September 1, 1944, the 122nd joined the 341st Rifle Division to form the 134th Rifle Corps. The Vyborg–Petrozavodsk offensive in June and July had forced a change of government in Helsinki by mid-August and on August 29 the government in Moscow agreed to accept an armistice delegation on two conditions: Finland must cease relations with Germany immediately; and all German forces must be evacuated or interned by September 15. Although the OKW had been making contingency plans since summer the decision still came as a surprise. Their forces in northern Finland, including XXXVI Mountain Corps, were now grouped into 20th Mountain Army, and this began Operation Birke on September 6. The 122nd had extended its north flank during the spring, unknown to XXXVI Corps, soon cutting its main line of retreat. The German force was obliged to switch to an alternative route which it had also prepared. In addition, 19th Army had managed to move a group of T-34 tanks through the wilderness, all unknown to XXXVI Corps, which was struck deep on its flank. This proved more of a psychological than a practical blow. The Army followed up as far as the 1940 border and stopped.

== Siege of Budapest ==
On November 14 the 122nd, with most of 19th Army, entered the Reserve of the Supreme High Command for redeployment to a more active front. Loading onto the railway it had defended for so long it moved far to the south, arriving at Ploiești on December 2, where it was assigned to the 133rd Rifle Corps under direct command of 2nd Ukrainian Front. The Corps also contained the 104th and 21st Rifle Divisions.

On December 26 the 2nd and 3rd Ukrainian Fronts completed the encirclement of some 70,000 German and Hungarian troops within Budapest. On January 1, 1945, the IV SS Panzer Corps launched Operation Konrad I in an effort to break through to the garrison, but this was stopped near Bicske. The second effort, Konrad II, began on January 7, and was also halted short of the city. At this time 133rd Corps was moving up from the south, concentrating at Dunapentele by January 18, just as Konrad III was underway. For this effort IV SS was joined by III Panzer Corps attacking from the south near Székesfehérvár.

=== Operation Konrad III ===
By the end of the day the 252nd Rifle Division had suffered heavy casualties while retreating to the Sarviz Canal near Szentvendel, while elements of the 1st Guards Fortified Region and two brigades of 7th Mechanized Corps had been encircled. To restore the situation the commander of 3rd Ukrainian Front, Marshal F. I. Tolbukhin, decided to commit the 133rd Corps and 18th Tank Corps into the area of the breakthrough. By dusk the 133rd reached a 2km-wide sector on the east bank of the Sarviz southeast of Falubattyan and entered combat with forward elements of III Panzer in Sárkeresztúr, with 18th Tanks in support. The 122nd and 21st took up a line from Tac to Kirp, 2km south of Nagylang.

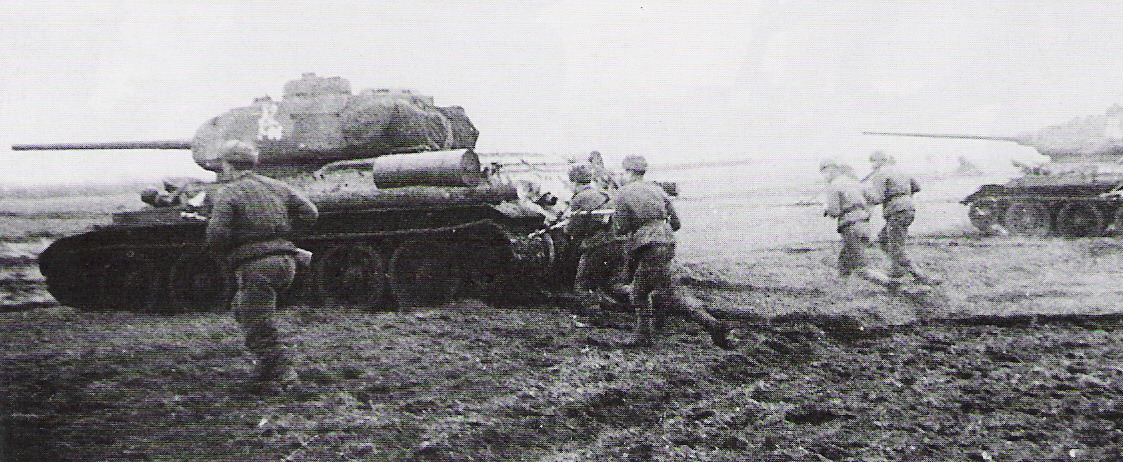
Counterattacking T34-85s of 18th Tank Corps with supporting infantry near the Danube

By 0100 hours on January 19 all bridges over the Sarviz had been destroyed, and all crossing points were under fire from Soviet artillery. Despite this, overnight III Panzer prepared crossing operations. The situation of the Budapest garrison was growing desperate as Pest had been taken. By 0900 both 133rd Rifle and 18th Tank Corps were involved in heavy fighting with superior German forces but managed to hold the line Seregélyes–Sárosd. The panzers now maneuvered around the flanks of 18th Tanks and reached the Danube on a sector from Adony to Dunapentele, splitting the Front's southern group from its northern group and pocketing most of both Corps. The commander of 18th Tanks received orders from Tolbukhin to break out to the south and take up a line from Alap to Dunapentele. 133rd Corps was resubordinated to 4th Guards Army at 0600 on January 20.

The breakout began overnight on January 21/22 in the direction of Hercegfalva. The force was operating along two axes: to the right was 181st Tank Brigade, 21st Rifle and part of the 122nd, along with the 10th Antitank Brigade, attempting to move on Alap and Sárkeresztúr; to the left the 110th Tank Brigade, 104th Rifle, plus the rest of 18th Tanks pushed toward Sárosd and Hercegfalva. The operation was successful as the blocking units of 3rd Panzer Division were shoved aside near Hercegfalva and the two Corps took up their new line, facing north. However, the main part of the 122nd became separated from its Corps during the breakout and struck to the north, reaching the 5th Guards Cavalry Corps and strengthening its defense. Over the next two days III Panzer made repeated efforts to break the Soviet lines and get into the rear of 57th Army without success, finally going over to the defense and redeploying near Adony for a new attack toward Baracska. This began overnight on January 25/26 with over 100 armored vehicles, including heavy tanks and self-propelled guns and managed to gain 10km in depth while also widening the penetration to 5km. This proved to be the high tide mark of Konrad as Soviet resistance pushed the German force over to the defense. 133rd Corps was reunited under 26th Army and reinforced on January 28, with orders to force the Sarviz. The Front attacked at noon on January 31 and gradually drove the Axis forces back to the Margit-Line from Lake Balaton to the Danube by February 13, when Budapest finally fell.

=== Operation Spring Awakening ===
Following the failure of the Ardennes Offensive in January the 6th Panzer Army was withdrawn and began moving east. The commander of Army Group South, Gen. O. A. W. Wöhler submitted four outlines to Hitler on February 22, dubbed Frühlingserwachen, designed to use this reserve to create a buffer that would protect the Nagykanizsa oil fields. The operation began at midnight on March 5; I SS Panzer Corps was ready at dawn to move west of the Sarviz Canal, but II SS Panzer Corps on the east side was 24 hours late. 3rd Ukrainian Front was well aware of the German buildup, which had taken more than a month. The offensive made poor progress and the Front counterattacked on the afternoon of March 16, and during the night of March 21/22 Székesfehérvár was retaken. At about this time the 122nd was transferred with 133rd Corps to 57th Army, and it would remain in this Army for the duration of the war.

== Postwar ==
Beginning on March 26 the division took part in the operation that captured the Hungarian oil fields, and for its part in taking Nagykanizsa it would be awarded the Order of Kutuzov, 2nd Degree, on April 26. General Velichko was wounded on April 13 and evacuated to hospital, being replaced by Col. Timofei Ilich Sidorenko. Velichko would return to the division after the German surrender, before moving to the Carpathian Military District where he served in the training establishment until his retirement in October 1955.

Under the terms of the decree that created the Southern Group of Forces from 3rd Ukrainian Front on June 15 the 122nd is listed as one of the divisions to be "disbanded in place". It was accordingly disbanded in July.
