= Antti Pennanen (lieutenant general) =

Finnish lieutenant general

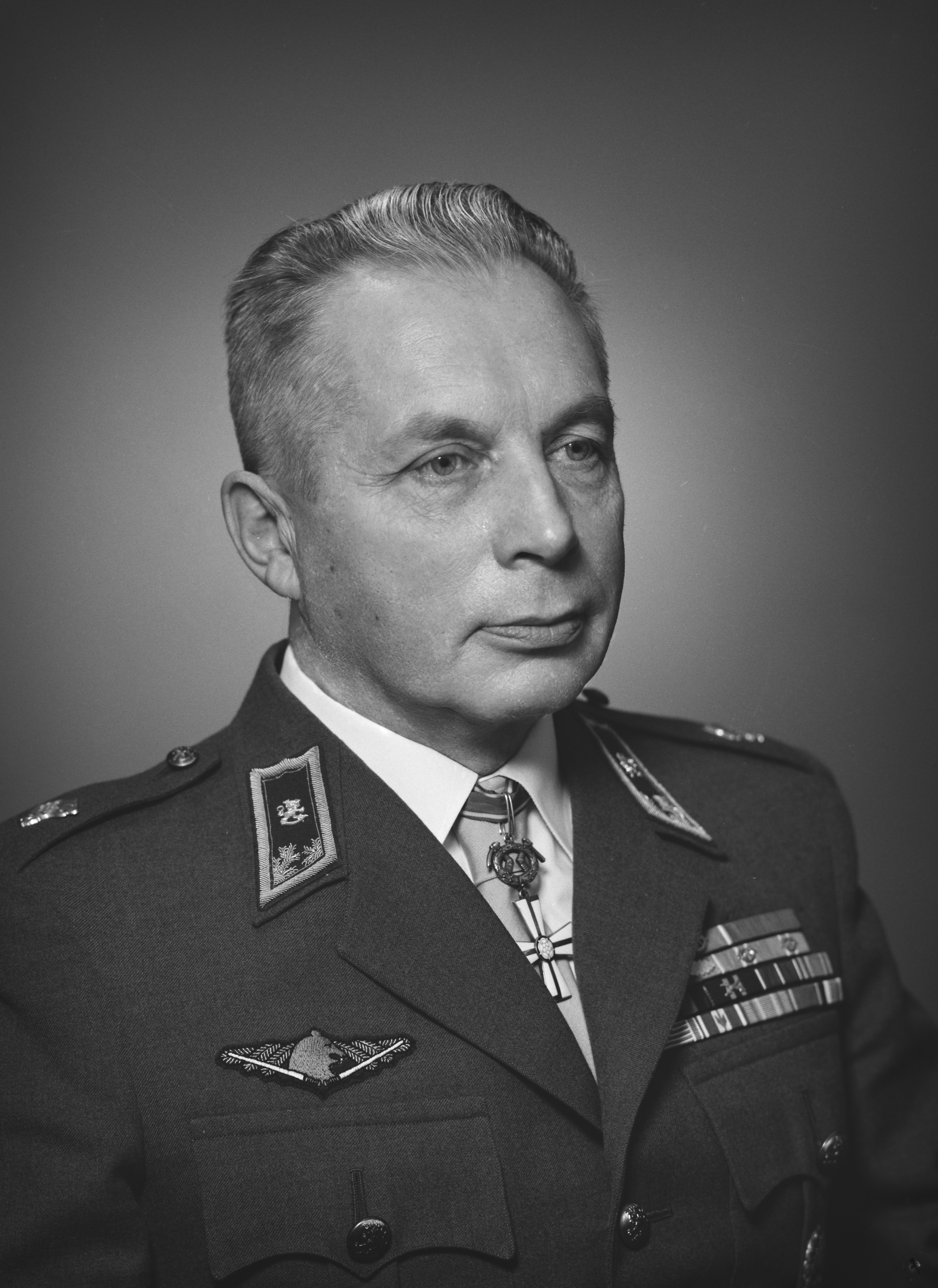
- Born: November 6, 1903; Kuusjärvi, Finland
- Died: October 30, 1989 (aged 85); Helsinki

Antti Pennanen (November 6, 1903 Kuusjärvi – October 30, 1989 Helsinki) was a Finnish lieutenant general who served as a captain in the Finnish Border Guard and Finnish Army during World War II and later as a Lieutenant general after the war. He is known for taking part in the Battle of Petsamo against the Red Army and Soviet forces.

== Biography ==
Pennanen was born in the town of Kuusjärvi (Outokumpu) On 6 November, 1903. Pennanen graduated from the Reserviupseerikoulu (Reserve Officer School in Finland) in 1927 and from the cadet school in 1931, and after the war attended the general commander's course 5 in 1950. Unlike the majority of generals, however, he did not attend the Military Academy. In the war of 1918, Pennanen took part in the Joensuu Guard Battalion. He started his officer career as a junior officer in KTR 2 and PPP 2 1928–1933. He served in the Lapland border guard from 1933 until the start of the winter war and at the same time also served as the commander of the Rovaniemi garrison from 1935 to 1938 and from the beginning of 1939 as a company commander.

=== The Battle of Petsamo ===
Pennanen started fighting in the Winter War as the commander of Er.P 16 and from the beginning of December until the armistice as the commander of Osasto Pennanen in the Petsamo front and area in the Battle of Petsamo. During the peacetime, he became the commander of Border Guard 6, and after the outbreak of the Continuation War, he became the commander of the Petsamo detachment until October 1944 in the Luttojoki area. At the end of 1944, he was the commander of the 15th brigade.

After the war, Pennanen was the commander of RjR 2 from 1945 to 1947. He served as commander of the Lapland border guard again from 1 July 1947 to 1 March 1956. At the same time, he served as deputy head of the Border Guards from 1 September 1947 to 4 May 1949. Next, he served as assistant to the head of the Border Guards from 1 March 1956 to 16 January 1962 and after that as head of the Border Guards from 16 January 1962 to 6 November 1966.

Promotions: Reserve Lieutenant 1928, Second Lieutenant 1931, Lieutenant 1931, Captain 1939, Major 1940, Lieutenant Colonel 1941, Colonel 1944, Major General 1956, Lieutenant General 1962.

The former editor-in-chief of Helsingin Sanomat Erkki Pennanen is the son of Antti Pennanen.

== See also ==
- Battle of Petsamo
- Winter War
- Continuation War
- World War II
