= Aleksi Hihnavaara =

Finnish frontiersman and reindeer herder

Aleksanteri (Aleksi) Hihnavaara, (November 21, 1882 - January 8, 1938) better known by his nickname Mosku, was a famous Finnish frontiersman and reindeer herder in Sompio region, Northeastern Lapland.

== Pre World War I ==
Before World War I, Hihnavaara earned his living by hunting, logging and reindeer herding. He bought a house beside the Luiro river from a Sami reindeer keeper and began to build up his own reindeer stock. His nickname "Mosku" came from Moskuvaara farm, which belonged to his grandfather. As the World War and impending revolution brought growing instability and restlessness to the region (which was close to the Russian border and the strategically important Murmansk), Hihnavaara became embroiled in a complicated border conflict between the Whites, the Reds, local Finnish reindeer keepers, and the indigenous Skolt Sami. The reindeer were the most important livestock in the area, so they were a strategic asset and frequent target of raids by various groups of revolutionaries, bandits, deserters, and local people.

== Finnish Civil War ==
During the Finnish Civil War, Hihnavaara patrolled the borderlands, guarding reindeer herds. According to archives and his own testimony, he killed three Reds in 1918 and at least one Skolt in 1919 in fights over the reindeer. It was during this period he met and befriended Jäger Captain (later General) Kurt Wallenius. Despite Hihnavaara not being a military man, Wallenius used his services in post-Civil War pacifying acts. In 1919, Wallenius and Hihnavaara undertook a punitive expedition against the Skolts. The expedition was made up of Finnish Border Guards and local civilians, and they crossed the Russian border, confiscating hundreds of reindeer. Wallenius would later detail the expedition in his 1933 book Man-hunters and Frontiersmen. The book became a best-seller in Finland and made Hihnavaara famous. The local population, however, was not always supportive of his sometimes ruthless measures, and his nickname was modified to Paha-Mosku (Mosku the Bad). In 1920 Wallenius recruited him as a guide for the Finnish attempt to conquer Pechenga. However, the expedition ended in defeat.

== Treaty of Tartu ==
After the 1920 Treaty of Tartu, the region stabilized, and Hihnavaara's personal reindeer herds gradually grew. By 1935, he owned over a thousand reindeer, making him one of the wealthiest men in the region. His relations with Skolt Sami also improved and he undertook many business trips to Skolt-land. However, he still had many personal enemies from his former exploits. He nearly always carried a firearm, and it is reported that there were at least two attempts on his life during the 1930s. His success and reputation were also a fertile breeding ground for malicious rumors: it was frequently claimed that he stole reindeer from his neighbours and the Skolt. However, these allegations were never conclusively proven.

== Personal life ==
Hihnavaara never married, but lived with his housekeeper and life partner Mari Tanhua. After two of their sons died at an early age, Hihnavaara's alcoholism took a turn for the worse. In winter 1936, he contracted severe pneumonia, and although he recovered, the illness left him with a heart condition. In January 1938, he died of a heart attack in his sleep at the age of 55 in Sodankylä. After his death, Mosku became a popular character in Finnish Lapland folktales and wilderness genre literature. Finnish author Sakari Kännö published his biography in 1992, and a movie based on the book appeared in 2003.

The Finnish author Lauri Hihnavaara is the son of Aleksi Hihnavaara and Mari Tanhua.

== Sources ==
- Kännö, Sakari, Mosku: kertomus poromies Aleksanteri Hihnavaarasta ja Lapin kenraali Kurt Martti Walleniuksesta vuosina 1900-1938, Porvoo 1992 ISBN 951-0-18156-0. (in Finnish)
