= Battle of Salla (1939) =

Battle of the Winter War

- Part of the Winter War
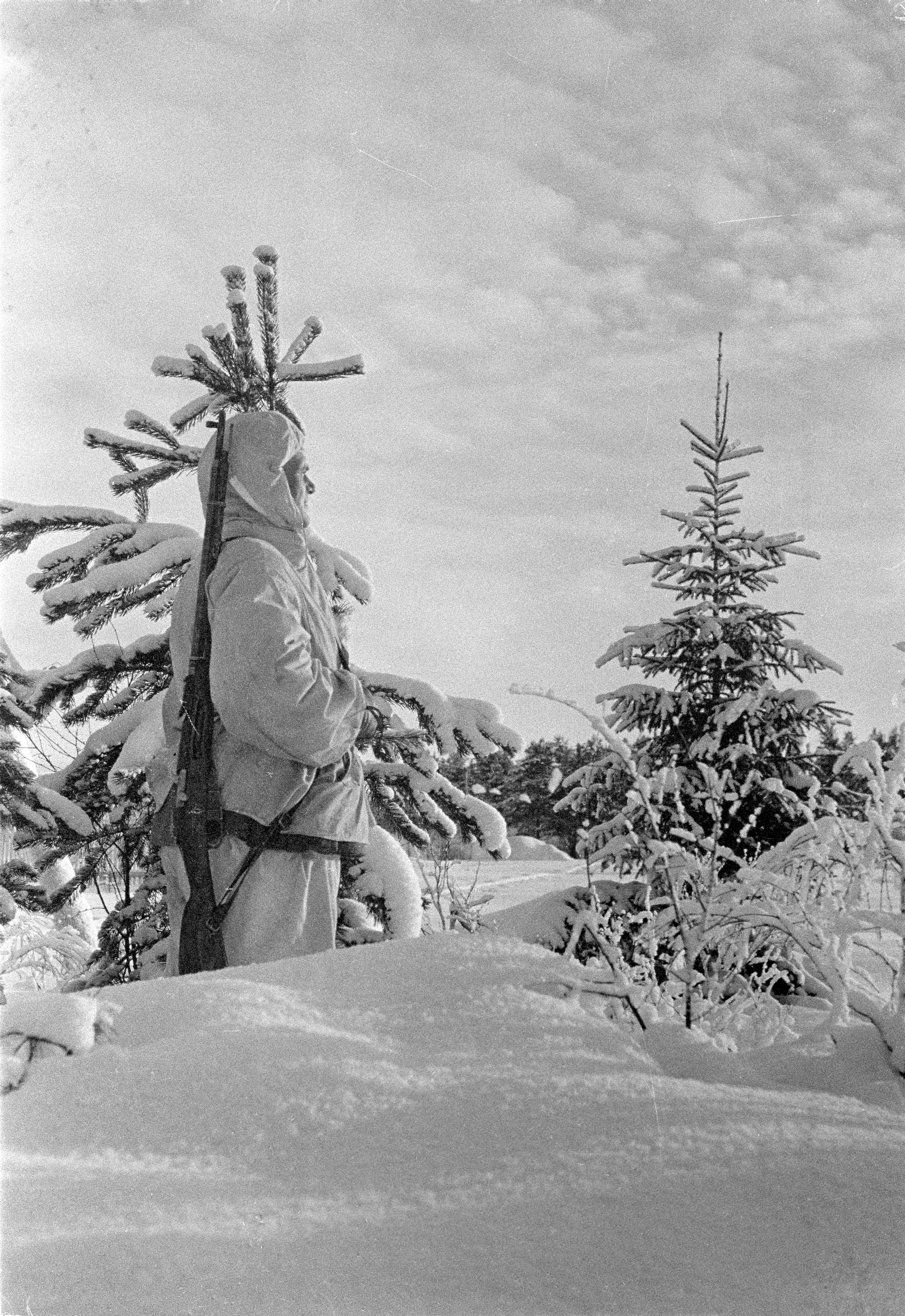
- A Finnish soldier on guard near Kemijärvi, 11 February 1940.
| Date | 30 November 1939 – 13 March 1940 |
| Location | Salla, Finnish Lapland 66°50′N 28°40′E |
| Result | Finnish victory |

Belligerents
| Finland: (Sweden) Swedish volunteers; (Norway) Norwegian volunteers | Soviet Union |

Commanders and leaders
| (Finland) Kurt Martti Wallenius (Finland) Ernst Linder | (Soviet Union) Mikhail Dukhanov (Soviet Union) Vasily Chuikov |

Units involved
| North Finland Group (Finland) Lapland Group: Detachment Roininen; (Sweden) Stridsgruppen SFK | (Soviet Union) 9th Army: 122nd Rifle Division; 88th Rifle Division |

Strength
| c. 3,500; From 10 February 1940 9,400 Scandinavian volunteers | Two infantry divisions |

Casualties and losses
| Finnish: 650 dead or missing 450 wounded Volunteers: 33 dead 50 wounded 130 frostbitten | 4,000 |
- Location within Finland

The Battle of Salla was fought between Finnish and Soviet troops near Salla in northern Finland during the Winter War. The Soviets had orders to advance through Salla to Kemijärvi and Sodankylä, and from there to Rovaniemi in just two weeks. From there they were to advance to Tornio and cut Finland in two. The Finnish troops managed to stop the Soviet advance just east of Kemijärvi. During the last days of February 1940 the Finnish troops were replaced with the Swedish, Norwegian and Danish volunteers of the Stridsgruppen SFK.

== Background ==
=== Opposing plans ===
==== Soviet preparations ====
By 1938 the Soviet Union had decided to conquer Finland. Relying in part on the information provided by Finnish communists, detailed intelligence on Finnish infrastructure had been prepared by the summer of 1939 in a 200-page book that was distributed to the invasion force. The Soviet 14th Army was tasked with invading Finland between Kuhmo and Salla and cutting the country in half by advancing to the shores of the Gulf of Bothnia. As part of the 14th Army's offensive, the 122nd Rifle Division, having arrived from Poland on 8 November 1939, was supposed to capture Salla and Kemijärvi and advance to Rovaniemi within two weeks, from where it would continue to Tornio near the Finnish border with Sweden. The Soviets were only expecting light resistance and the troops were ordered not to cross the Swedish frontier.

The Soviets began building a railroad from Kandalaksha to the Finnish border in 1939 using 100,000 prisoners as slave laborers. In the late 1930s, existing roads were improved and new ones had been built from the Murmansk Railway to the Finnish border, such as the road from Kandalaksha to Alakurtti.

==== Finnish preparations ====
The improvements in Soviet infrastructure and demographics near the border that made it possible to supply 40,000 troops in the region had little effect on Finnish operational planning in northern Finland. The Finnish general staff did not believe the Soviets would launch a major offensive from the White Sea region to Finland. As a result, work on fortifying key road choke-points in northern Finland only began in the autumn of 1939.

The forces in northern Finland were under the command of the staff of the Lapland Group, which in turn was led by the North Finland Group. The Finns had one detached battalion (Er.P 17) and one company (Er.K Kojonen) near Salla that were supposed to conduct an active defense by crossing the border, stopping the advance of the Soviet regiment that was expected in the area and harassing the Soviet lines of communications, thereby tying down Soviet forces. The Finnish general staff considered the force insufficient for even this mission, but could not spare any more troops from the more important Karelian Isthmus. As Finland undertook a general mobilization in October 1939, the troops had time to take stock of the situation and came to the conclusion that even limited offensive operations across the border were beyond their capabilities and afterwards only defensive and delaying operations were practiced in training.

A Finnish intelligence estimate on 15 October placed one Soviet division in the Murmansk-Kandalaksha area. The Finns expected a larger Soviet force concentration in the future. On 30 November, the Soviets had four divisions in the area.

=== Military geography ===
Southern Lapland is 80% covered by forests or swamps. The geography is dominated by forest-covered fells that surround large swamps and lakes. In December 1939 the lakes and swamps were not yet sufficiently frozen over to support motor vehicle movement but this became irrelevant as the winter progressed and the temperature dropped to -40°, which also made military operations more difficult.

Movement outside roads was thus impossible for large military formations. Only one road existed from the Soviet border to Salla. The road network was better developed west of it, with numerous small roads to support lateral movements and the encirclement of defending forces.

== Order of battle ==
=== Finland ===
There were only a few Finnish troops in the area at the start of the war. The 17th Separate Battalion (Er.P 17) or the "Salla Battalion" was mobilized before the war. Its main components came from a company of the Frontier Guard. From 11 December 1939 onward the Finnish troops were part of the Lapland Group (Lapin Ryhmä) which was commanded by Major General Kurt Martti Wallenius. After 5 December infantry, artillery, mortar and anti-tank units were to reinforce the defenders. The total number of Finnish forces in the area was c. 3,500.

=== Soviet Union ===
The Soviets attacked with the 122nd Rifle Division. The stalling of the offensive forced the Soviets to reinforce it in late December 1939 with the 88th Rifle Division.

== The battle ==
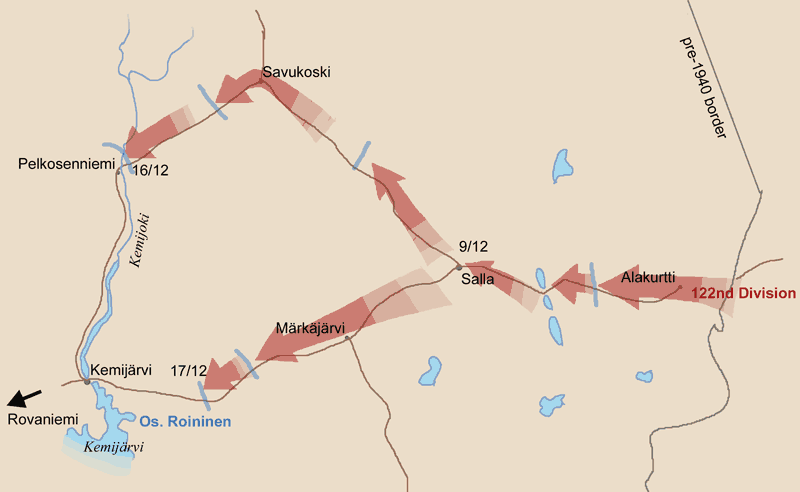
Initial Soviet advance 30 November – 17 December

By 17 December the Finnish army had seven battalions opposing the Soviet 122nd and 88th Divisions west of Salla. By then Mannerheim created the Lapland Group under Kurt Martti Wallenius, covering the fighting from Salla to Petsamo. On 18 December, the northern Soviet thrust was stopped at Pelkosenniemi, and during a Finnish night attack, the Soviets panicked and fled all the way back to Raatikka, 10 mles northwest of Salla. On 20 December, the Soviet southern thrust was stopped outside Joutsijärvi, ending the threat to Kemijärvi.

Soviet troops pushed the Finns up to the Kemijoki river, but were unable to break through the Finnish defences on the river. The Soviet supply lines were now 145 kilometers long. The Finns took advantage of the overstretched Soviet position by launching attacks with ski troops on the Soviet lines of communications. One third of Soviet troops were occupied guarding them. On 13 January, the Soviet 9th Army ordered the 122nd Division to retreat to the Märkäjärvi village.

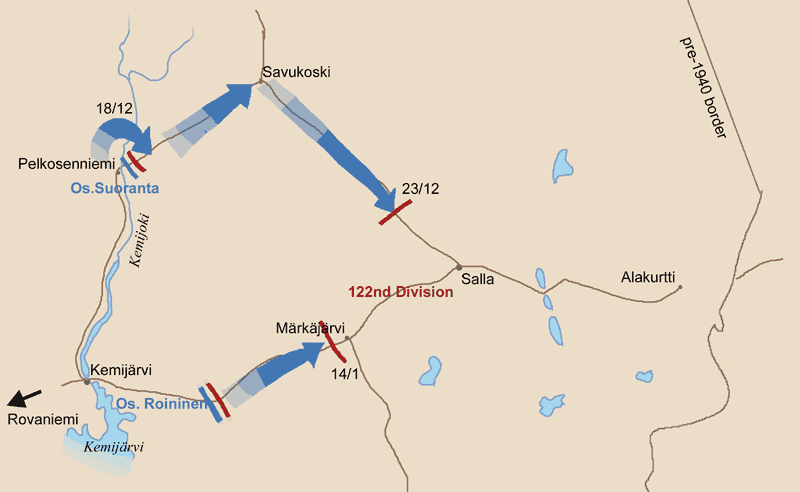
Finnish counter-attacks and Soviet withdrawal.

For the next two months the battle was a stalemate, apart from small skirmishes and exchanges of artillery fire. On 13 March, the last day of the war, the Soviets initiated a major fire preparation with artillery, aircraft and infantry weapons as part of a planned renewal of offensive operations towards Rovaniemi. The Scandinavian volunteers suffered their most casualty-intensive day of the war, with 10 killed and 30 wounded.

Overall, Finnish casualties were 1,100 men, including 650 dead or missing. Scandinavian volunteer casualties were 33 dead, 50 wounded and 130 frostbitten. Soviet losses are estimated at 4,000.

== See also ==
- List of Finnish military equipment of World War II
- List of Soviet Union military equipment of World War II
