= 88th Rifle Division =

88th Rifle Division (1 September 1939 – 17 March 1942) 88th Rifle Division (29 April 1942 – 29 May 1945)
- Active: 1939–1945
- Country: Soviet Union
- Branch: Red Army
- Type: Division
- Role: Infantry
- Engagements: Winter War; Battle of Salla (1939); Operation Silver Fox; Battles of Rzhev; Operation Mars; Rzhev–Vyasma Offensive Operation; Battle of Smolensk (1943); Orsha offensives (1943); Operation Bagration; Vitebsk–Orsha offensive Minsk offensive Vilnius–Kaunas offensive Gumbinnen-Goldap operation Vistula–Oder offensive East Prussian offensive Heiligenbeil Pocket; Prague offensive
- Decorations: Order of the Red Banner (2nd Formation); Order of Suvorov (2nd Formation); Order of Kutuzov (2nd Formation)
- Battle honours: Vitebsk (2nd Formation)

Commanders
- Notable commanders: Maj. Gen. Andrei Ivanovich Zelentsov; Col. Vladimir Aleksandrovich Solovyov; Col. Andrei Filippovich Bolotov; Col. Fyodor Trofimovich Kovtunov; Maj. Gen. Nikita Sergeevich Samokhvalov

The 88th Rifle Division was twice formed as an infantry division of the Red Army, first as part of the prewar buildup of forces. In its first formation in the far north it had an unusual shtat (table of organization and equipment) probably to facilitate its movement in the roadless tundra and forests of that region. During the Winter War against Finland it saw action in the fighting around Salla. Its organization again proved beneficial in the spring of 1942 during the first stages of the Great Patriotic War. It played a large role in holding and then pushing back the Finnish III Army Corps during Operation Silver Fox and for this success was redesignated as the 23rd Guards Rifle Division.

A new 88th began forming in April 1942 based on the first formation of the 39th Rifle Brigade, mostly in the Moscow Military District and was soon assigned to the 31st Army of Western Front; it would remain in that Army for the duration of the war. It took part in the savage and mostly fruitless fighting around the Rzhev salient into the winter of 1942/43 and then in the summer offensive that liberated Smolensk. During the following fall it became badly depleted as Western Front repeatedly attempted to batter its way through the German defenses to Orsha. After rebuilding in the spring of 1944 it served as part of 3rd Belorussian Front during Operation Bagration, soon being awarded a battle honor as well as the Order of the Red Banner. During this offensive it reached the border of East Prussia and won a second decoration in the unsuccessful Gumbinnen-Goldap Operation. During the East Prussian Offensive in January 1945 it made steady progress, eventually earning its third Order after the battle for the Heiligenbeil Pocket. After the East Prussian campaign the 31st Army was railed south to Czechoslovakia where the 88th ended the war marching on Prague. Despite a fine record as a fighting unit the division was soon disbanded.

== 1st Formation ==
The 88th Rifle Division began forming for the first time on the day the war began in Europe, September 1, 1939 at Arkhangelsk in the Arkhangelsk Military District. During November it was transported across the White Sea to Belomorsk. By December 1 the division was developing a two-pronged attack on Salla in cooperation with the 122nd Rifle Division. The intermediate objective was the town of Kemijärvi en route to Rovaniemi, the capital of Lapland. By December 17 the 122nd Division was less than 30km from the former when it was struck by Finnish counterattacks and forced to retreat on some sectors. As the 88th came up it was fed into the fighting piecemeal with little result. By the end of the month the two Soviet divisions were hard-pressed to hold the ground they had gained and under fresh attacks beginning on January 2, 1940 were forced back to a line of ridges 3km west of Märkäjärvi. There they dug in and remained for the duration of the war.

Maj. Gen. Andrei Ivanovich Zelentsov took command of the division on 14 June 1940. As of 22 June 1941 the division's order of battle was as follows:

- 426th Rifle Regiment
- 611th Rifle Regiment
- 758th Rifle Regiment
- 401st Light Artillery Regiment
- 269th Antitank Battalion
- 147th Reconnaissance Battalion
- 222nd Sapper Battalion
- 221st Signal Battalion
- 368th Mortar Battalion (until 16 October 1941)
- 288th Medical/Sanitation Battalion
- 128th Chemical Defense (Anti-gas) Company
- 184th Motor Transport Battalion
- 154th Field Bakery
- 189th Field Artillery Remount Workshop
- 191st Field Postal Station
- 373rd Field Office of the State Bank

Zelentsov also served as the acting commander of Arkhangelsk Military District from 27 June to 5 July. The division remained near Arkhangelsk until the beginning of August, when it was shipped across the White Sea to Murmansk. Sharp states that it's possible the 88th had a special organization for operations in the roadless arctic terrain because it did not have a howitzer regiment and when it was disembarked from 10 small transports from 9–14 August it had just 7,818 personnel on strength with 58 artillery pieces of all calibres, 22 trucks and 1,928 horses in total. It also had a full reconnaissance battalion versus the standard company. This does not match any prewar shtat but appears to be a lightly armed organization utilizing horse packing for most of its transport needs.

The German-Finnish Operation Silver Fox had begun on 1 July with the goal of cutting the Murmansk railway and on 7 August the Finnish III Corps, commanded by Lt. Gen. Hjalmar Siilasvuo, captured Kestenga. By now he was 65 km short of his objective of Loukhi. The Soviet 14th Army sent in a group of reserves known as the Grivnik Brigade which slowed the Finnish drive. At this point the 88th joined the Kemskaya Operations Group and took over defense of the Kestenga-Loukhi road, one of the few avenues of operation in this mostly trackless wilderness. On 15 August, while leading the division as it attempted to establish defensive positions along the Sofiangi River, General Zelentsov was killed in a German air attack; he was replaced five days later by Col. Vladimir Aleksandrovich Solovyov. By this time the Finnish forces were exhausted and on 25 August General Siilasvuo called a halt to regroup.

After being reinforced by units of the German XXXVI Mountain Corps the Finns resumed their offensive on 30 October. The 88th Division had also been reinforced and had had time to improve its positions. Despite this the attackers made progress and by 6 November two battalions of the 426th Rifle Regiment and a company of the 611th Regiment were fighting in encirclement. The next day two Finnish and one German battalion that had earlier infiltrated between the two Regiments were driven back 45 km along the Kestenga-Loukhi road by other Soviet forces. On 9 November the encircled battalions of the 426th, low on ammunition and without food, were forced to break out; only 275 men returned to friendly lines. On 16 November the offensive subsided, in part due to heavy casualties on the Axis side but also due to diplomatic pressure from the United States government which threatened consequences for Finland if its supply deliveries to the USSR were interrupted. However, this might have been, the division was credited with stopping the Finnish drive and largely in recognition of this it was redesignated as the 23rd Guards Rifle Division on 17 March 1942, one of only two Guards divisions created (the other being the 10th Guards Rifle) in the Arctic.

On 22 February 1943 two soldiers of the division would be posthumously made Heroes of the Soviet Union for their roles in the November battles. Krasnoarmeets Mikhail Egorovich Rodionov had been a machinegunner in the 2nd Battalion of the 426th Rifle Regiment. While fighting in encirclement Rodionov helped to drive off seven enemy attacks with his fire, despite being wounded. Following a second wound he lost consciousness; when he revived he killed himself with a grenade before being captured. Cpl. Fyodor Afanasevich Luzan commanded a radio platoon of the 758th Rifle Regiment. On 24 November, while fighting for the railway station on the Loukhi-Kastenga line his battalion was surrounded by enemy tanks and infantry. In order to help his comrades to break through to friendly lines Luzan called in artillery fire on his own position. Soon after, as SS troops were breaking into his dugout, he blew up himself and his radio with a grenade, taking several attackers with him.

== 2nd Formation ==
The 88th began forming again on 29 April 1942 based on the 39th Rifle Brigade at Kizner in the Urals Military District.

=== 39th Rifle Brigade ===
The 1st formation of the 39th Rifle Brigade began in October 1941 at Alma-Ata in the Central Asia Military District. It was formed from the Alma-Ata and Fruzensk Rifle-Machine gun Schools, largely with students of Kazakh nationality. In December the brigade was shipped north and by 1 January 1942 was in the reserves of Northwestern Front, under command of Col. V. G. Noziyak. It was then assigned to 4th Shock Army taking part in the Toropets-Kholm Offensive and on 21 January was one of the units recognized for its role in the liberation of Toropets and the capture of the German supply base there. By the end of the month 4th Shock came under command of Kalinin Front and the brigade remained in the Toropets salient to the west of the German-held Rzhev salient until April when it was pulled back well east of Moscow where it was disbanded to form the cadre for the new 88th Rifle Division.

Although it physically formed in the Urals the new 88th Division, based on an existing cadre, was very soon assigned to the Moscow Military District. Its order of battle was similar to that of the 1st formation:

- 426th Rifle Regiment
- 611th Rifle Regiment
- 758th Rifle Regiment
- 401st Artillery Regiment
- 269th Antitank Battalion
- 222nd Sapper Battalion
- 147th Reconnaissance Company
- 221st Signal Company
- 288th Medical/Sanitation Battalion
- 128th Chemical Defense (Anti-gas) Company
- 598th Motor Transport Battalion
- 489th Field Bakery
- 1004th Divisional Veterinary Hospital
- 1596th Field Postal Station
- 1642nd Field Office of the State Bank
- Divisional Training Battalion

Col. Andrei Filippovich Bolotov was assigned to command of the division on the day it began forming. In June it was assigned to the 4th Reserve Army in the Reserve of the Supreme High Command and then in July to 31st Army in Western Front.

=== Battles for Rzhev ===
Western Front began its part in the First Rzhev–Sychyovka Offensive Operation on 4 August. A powerful artillery preparation reportedly knocked out 80 percent of German weapons, after which the German defenses were penetrated on both sides of Pogoreloe Gorodishche and the 31st Army's mobile group rushed through the breaches towards Zubtsov. By the evening of 6 August the breach in the German 9th Army's front had expanded up to 30 km wide and up to 25 km deep. The following day the STAVKA appointed Army Gen. G. K. Zhukov to coordinate the offensives of Western and Kalinin Fronts; Zhukov proposed to liberate Rzhev with 31st and 30th Armies as soon as 9 August. However, heavy German counterattacks, complicated by adverse weather soon slowed the advance drastically. On 23 August the 31st Army, in concert with elements of the 29th Army, finally liberated Zubtsov. While this date is officially considered the end of the offensive in Soviet sources, in fact bitter fighting continued west of Zubtsov into mid-September. At dawn on 8, 29 and 31 September Armies went on a determined offensive to seize the southern part of Rzhev. Despite resolute attacks through the following day against the German 161st Infantry Division the 31st made little progress. It suspended its attacks temporarily on 16 September but resumed them with three divisions, including the 88th, on its right flank on 21–23 September with similar lack of success. Over the course of the fighting from 4 August to 15 September the Army suffered a total of 43,321 total losses in personnel.

In the planning for Operation Mars a directive was sent on 28/29 September from the command of Western Front to 31st Army, "consisting of the 88th, 239th, 336th and 20th Guards Rifle Divisions, the 32nd and 145th Tank Brigades... [to advance] along the Osuga, Artemovo, and Ligastaevo axis." The offensive finally began on 25 November when the Army's shock group, consisting of the above forces minus the 20th Guards, attacked the German 102nd Infantry Division. That division's history recorded:

"At 7:30 a.m., the brown masses of Russian infantry emerged from their assembly places in the woods. Tanks, 25 thundering, spitting monsters, rolled forward to support them. Wave after wave of Russians advanced against the 102nd Infantry Division. The Germans were ready. Standing in their trenches they fired over their parapets into the enemy masses sweeping forward over the barren fields. Their machine-guns raked the Russians. Anti-tank guns cracked flatly; field guns roared. And the Russians fell. A handful reached the German lines and were captured. Others charged forward. But at 9:40 they paused to catch their breath. When they renewed their attacks, this time in a light snowfall, the men of the 102nd again drove them back. The end of the day found the Germans firmly in possession of their lines."

In three days of fighting the tank brigades were decimated and the rifle divisions suffered heavy losses, up to 50 percent on the first day alone. The Army then went over to the defense. On 11 December it went back to the attack, in support of 20th Army. These attacks continued until the 18th. In February 1943 the armies of Western and Kalinin Fronts began preparing for what would become the Rzhev-Vyasma Offensive Operation. 31st Army was to be prepared to attack by 20–21 February. In the event these plans were delayed and eventually superseded when German 9th Army launched Operation Büffel on 1 March and began its phased withdrawal from the salient, pursued by 31st and other armies through the rest of the month.

== Into Western Russia and Belarus ==
In June the 88th was assigned to the new 45th Rifle Corps, along with the 220th and 331st Rifle Divisions. On 7 August, the first day of Operation Suvorov, the only real Soviet success was achieved by 31st Army against XXXIX Panzer Corps in the Yartsevo sector. The main effort was made by the 36th and 45th Corps, the latter of which had the 220th and 331st Divisions in first echelon and the 88th in second. The attack gathered steam late in the day as the Corps attacked east of the Vop River. It faced the inexperienced 113th Infantry Division which had only been at the front for two weeks. Between 1800 and 2000 hours the Corps overran one German battalion and threw another aside; an hour later an artillery battalion had also been overrun and it was clear the 113th's front was breaking apart. During the night two German regiments fell back 2km where a main battle line was reestablished behind the 6m-wide Vedosa River. Sensing confusion in the German ranks the commander of 31st Army, Maj. Gen. V. A. Gluzdovsky, committed his mobile group to break through to the Minsk-Moscow highway just 6km to the south. For a brief moment it seemed the 45th Corps and the 42nd Guards Tank Brigade might achieve a breakthrough.

The attack was resumed at dawn on 8 August and gained more ground from the 113th Infantry which was now near collapse. By early afternoon the 260th Grenadier Regiment cracked after losing a key position and the 220th Division surged into the gap just east of the Vop. The only substantial reserve available to German 4th Army was the 18th Panzergrenadier Division which was ordered into the counterattack. As it arrived it could only fill the gap left by the routed units of the 113th. The next day the two Soviet corps continued to try to batter their way through the German line but were stymied by 18th Panzergrenadiers; during this fighting Colonel Bolotov was killed by German tank or assault gun fire on his command post. He would be replaced by Col. Gavrill Alekseevich Bulanov on 12 August. The 42nd Guards Tanks failed to reach the highway and lost 35 tanks in the process. On the other hand, a major counterattack by 18th Panzergrenadier failed to restore the original front line due to heavy Soviet artillery fire and the obstacle of the Vedosa. After three days of fighting the situation was a stalemate, but the German reserve was fixed in place.

Within a few days the stalemate on the Smolensk front had become general. As of 1 September the 45th Corps consisted of the 88th and 251st Rifle Divisions. Western Front's offensive finally resumed on 15 September and by the end of the day Yartsevo was liberated. 45th Corps was transferred to 68th Army on 18 September and over the following week the 68th and 31st Armies pressed to encircle Smolensk, which was finally taken early in the morning of 25 September. On 9 October the 88th came under the command of Col. Fyodor Trofimovich Kovtunov. During this month the division continued to advance towards the Belorussian border with 68th Army, but later that month 45th Corps rejoined the 31st Army.

=== Orsha Offensives ===
68th Army advanced westward south of the Dniepr River in early October with 45th Corps to the rear, closing up to the defenses of the German XXVII Army Corps late on 8 October. The 88th immediately reinforced the assault of the 159th Rifle Division across the Mereya River, forcing the 18th Panzergrenadiers to withdraw westward. The division formed a forward detachment to pursue but the German division turned back towards the east and took up new defensive positions along the Rossasenka River on 11 October. The Army prepared to resume its attacks the next day, but by now the 45th Corps was marching north to rejoin 31st Army.

31st Army also began a new attempt to reach Orsha on 12 October with 45th Corps (now including the 220th Division) serving as its second echelon and reserve. The Army was positioned astride the Smolensk-Orsha highway north of the Dniepr. Western Front's offensive began after an artillery preparation of 85 minutes but 31st Army immediately stalled without any appreciable gains and at considerable cost. The offensive resumed the next day with reinforcements from the second echelon with no better results. Over the course of the fighting from 12 to 18 October the Front lost 5,858 personnel killed and 17,478 wounded. In preparation for a new effort 31st Army was further reinforced and regrouped its three corps south between the highway and the Dniepr, with 45th Corps in the center; the 88th and 251st Divisions were in first echelon and the 220th in second. The attack began early on 21 October following two hours and ten minutes of artillery fire. The shock groups smashed the defenses of the 197th Infantry Division between the villages of Redki and Novaya, at considerable cost and by early evening had penetrated 4 km deep on a front 1,000m wide toward the village of Kireevo, on the main rail line to Orsha. Two brigades of the 2nd Guards Tank Corps were committed into the penetration but were soon halted by heavy German fire from the flanks. The attack was resumed the next day but gained 1,000m at most. On 24 October the second echelon divisions were committed in a final effort to break the German defenses but failed in part due to artillery ammunition shortages. The offensive was halted at nightfall on 26 October by which time the offensive capabilities of 10th Guards and 31st Army were completely exhausted after gaining 4–6 km at a combined cost of 4,787 killed and 14,315 wounded.

In early November Western Front prepared for another attempt to break through the German defenses. The Front's first shock group consisted of the 10th Guards and 31st Armies on both sides of the Minsk highway, but by now their rifle divisions averaged only 4,500 personnel each. 45th Corps, south of Kireevo, faced the 119th Panzergrenadier Regiment of 25th Panzergrenadier Division. The 88th was in the first echelon when the attack began on 14 November after a three-and-a-half hour artillery and air preparation, but was soon stopped in its tracks due to heavy machine gun fire. The fighting continued over the next four days but 45th Corps gained no more than 400m at considerable cost. The STAVKA, however, ordered the offensive to continue, which it did beginning on 30 November after another regrouping. 31st and 10th Guards Armies were concentrated on a 12 km-wide sector from Osintori to the Dniepr, with the 31st focused on just 3 km of that with four divisions in first echelon and five in the second. In the event the attack made virtually no ground even after the second echelon was brought up, and the Front went over to the defense on 5 December. The failure of the Orsha offensives was ascribed, apart from the strength of the German defenses, to a lack of training of Red Army replacements and a stereotyped use of artillery which did more to warn the German forces of attacks than to actually inflict damage. During December the STAVKA ordered Western Front to shift its efforts towards Vitebsk.

== Operation Bagration ==
By the beginning of January 1944 the 88th, one of just four divisions remaining in 31st Army, had been assigned to the 114th Rifle Corps with the 251st Division, but by a month later it was a separate division. In February it came under command of 71st Rifle Corps with the 331st Division; it would remain in this Corps for most of the rest of the war. On 27 February General Gluzdovsky was ordered to prepare yet another assault on the Orsha axis in cooperation with 49th Army to his south. Since most of his Army was involved in offensive operations in the Babinavichy sector he only had his 71st Corps for this new attack, which began on 5 March and continued over the next four days. In the event the effort was unsuccessful at the cost to the two armies of another 1,898 killed and 5,639 wounded.

On 11 April Western Front was disbanded and 31st Army was assigned to the new 3rd Belorussian Front, where it would remain until the last month of the war. Over the next two months the 88th got a much needed respite for rebuilding and replenishment. In the buildup to the Soviet summer offensive against Army Group Center on 12–13 June the 88th and 192nd Rifle Divisions of 71st Corps were shifted north to make room for the deployment of 11th Guards Army on the sector north of the Dniepr. When the offensive began with probing attacks on 22 June those of 31st Army were driven back by heavy artillery and mortar fire. The following day the first echelon divisions of 71st Corps broke the German defense north of the Dniepr, and advanced 3 km before being halted by increasing enemy resistance. During the fighting near the Kireevo railway station Sen. Lieutenant Anna Alekseevna Nikandrova, a Komsomol leader of the 426th Rifle Regiment, was distinguished for her gallantry. She used a hook ladder to help the soldiers of her company through an antitank ditch; later that day she blocked the embrasure of a German machinegun bunker with her body and was killed. On 24 March 1945 she was posthumously made a Hero of the Soviet Union.

Over the next two days the 11th Guards and 5th Armies developed much more momentum along the Orsha and Bogushevsk axes, leaving 31st Army behind. Meanwhile, in the fighting around the Vitebsk salient, by 24 June the Soviets were torn by the classic dilemma of blitzkrieg warfare—how many units to use to close the pocket and how many to keep pressing forward before the enemy had time to create defensive positions. 39th Army, which was responsible for 3rd Belorussian Front's part of this encirclement, had only its 84th Rifle Corps available for the battle for the city itself. As a result, the 88th was moved north and attached to this Corps.

Elements of 39th Army linked up with forces of the 1st Baltic Front late on the 24th, leaving the German LIII Army Corps trapped in Vitebsk and in several smaller pockets along the road leading to the southwest. Over the next two days, as Hitler refused permission for the Corps to break out, the Soviet forces prepared to liquidate the pocket, which began at 0900 hours on 27 June, preceded by a massive barrage of artillery and rockets. By noon the defenders had been broken into small pockets and during the afternoon the remnants surrendered. The German Army lost 20,000 killed and 10,000 prisoners. For its part in this fighting the division was awarded a battle honor:

"VITEBSK" - 88th Rifle Division (Colonel Kovtunov, Fyodor Trofimovich)... The troops who participated in the liberation of Vitebsk, by the order of the Supreme High Command of 26 June 1944, and a commendation in Moscow, are given a salute of 20 artillery salvoes from 224 guns.

=== Minsk Offensive ===
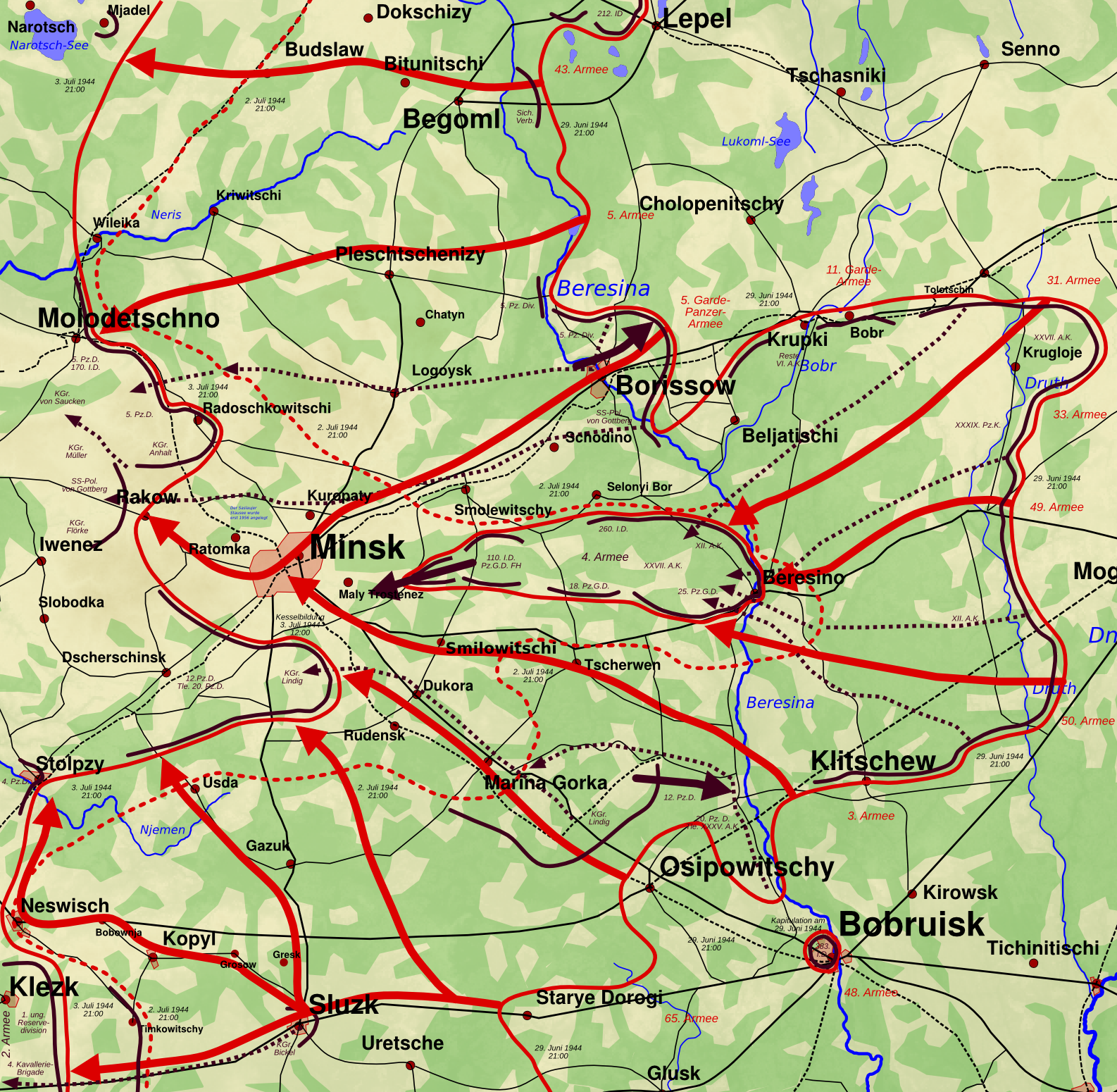
Map of the Minsk Offensive. Note route of 31st Army.

After the battle for Vitebsk the division advanced along the highway to Minsk to rejoin 71st Corps as it and the 36th Rifle Corps were consolidating the success of 5th Guards Tank Army which was operation ahead. 31st Army had been assigned a leading role in the liquidation of the defeated and mostly encircled German 4th Army and the liberation of the Belorussian capital, which was completed on 4 July. On the previous day a decree of the STAVKA read, in part:

"MINSK" - 426th Rifle Regiment (Lt. Colonel Uzvak, Pavel Dmitrievich)... 611th Rifle Regiment (Lt. Colonel Sadkovskii, Yosif Vikentevich)... 758th Rifle Regiment (Lt. Colonel Moshtakov, Evgenii Filaretovich... The troops who participated in the liberation of Minsk, by the order of the Supreme High Command of 3 July 1944, and a commendation in Moscow, are given a salute of 24 artillery salvoes from 324 guns.

In addition to these battle honors on 23 July the 88th as a whole would receive the Order of the Red Banner for its part in the clearing of the city.

=== Vilnius-Kaunas Offensive ===
During 5–6 July the 71st Corps pursued the German forces to the west, advancing up to 40 km and reaching a line from Pershaie eastward along the north bank of the Islach River as far as Rakuv. Over the next two days the entire Front continued its pursuit in the direction of Vilnius, which was reached by 3rd Guards Mechanized Corps on the morning of 7 July. At the same time the 71st Corps was overcoming limited resistance in the Naliboki forest with the assistance of partisans and reached the Berezina River by the end of the day. The battle for Vilnius would continue until 13 July, but meanwhile on 8 July the 31st Army had advanced another 25–30 km towards the Neman River. Hitler regarded this as his "line of catastrophe" to be held at any price. During 12–13 July the Army successfully pursued the German forces 55–60 km while its left flank advanced towards Grodno. By the next day most of the remaining defenders had begun deploying along the river line as 3rd Belorussian Front began preparing to force the Neman and also to liberate Kaunas.

That day a forward detachment of 36th Corps seized a crossing north of Grodno. On 15 July it was joined by elements of 71st Corps which took two more bridgeheads in the same area. At this point the Army commander, Col. Gen. V. V. Glagolev, was ordered to regroup his forces to the right flank and force the Neman along the Army's entire front. By the end of 17 July the 11th Guards, 5th and 31st Armies had together breached the river line on a 110 km front and repelled all counterattacks. After further gains the Stavka of the Supreme High Command ordered the Front over to a temporary defense on 20 July. In recognition of the 88th's success in the Neman crossing on 12 August the 426th Regiment would be decorated with the Order of the Red Banner, while the 611th and 758th Regiments would each receive the Order of Aleksandr Nevsky.

== Into Germany ==
The temporary defensive was in part to prepare the Front for an invasion of East Prussia, which began at 0840 hours on 29 July following a 40-minute artillery preparation and airstrikes. On the first day 31st Army advanced as much as 15 km. On the following day the entire German defense along the Neman was crushed and the Front advanced rapidly towards Vilkaviškis. However the Army soon ran into woodland and lake terrain which slowed the advance as stubborn resistance developed. The operation was generally halted on 31 July.

=== Goldap-Gumbinnen Operation ===
A new offensive into East Prussia began on 16 October; 3rd Belorussian Front Front planned to drive directly from Gumbinnen through Insterburg to Königsberg. However, heavy German resistance soon stalled and even reversed this offensive. Goldap, to the south of the main drive, was soon taken, but German 4th Army committed its 102nd Panzer and Führer Grenadier Brigades to the fighting and retook it on 25 October. In a surprise attack by 31st Army on 28 October the town again changed hands, but the situation soon deteriorated as further counterattacks struck home. By 3 November the 611th Rifle Regiment was surrounded and was ordered to break out to friendly lines the next night. The regimental banner was entrusted to Sen. Sergeant Andrei Nikolaievich Elgin, a squad leader of the regiment's sub-machine gun company. Elgin had the banner wrapped around his torso under his uniform before leading a team of four men out of the town along a single path through the woods and marshland to the east. When the route was blocked by a German machine gun post he charged it, throwing grenades until it was destroyed with the help of his men. Although wounded, Elgin refused to give up the banner and continued on. Later, while crossing between the lines the party was spotted by the light of flares and a German group attempted to capture it. With his sub-machine gun and grenades Elgin killed eight of the enemy but received a second wound which proved fatal. He finally handed over the banner to a rescue group before he died. On 20 March 1945 he was posthumously made a Hero of the Soviet Union. Despite the overall failure of the Goldap-Gumbinnen operation the 88th received the Order of Suvorov, 2nd Degree, for its efforts on 14 November.

On 19 December Colonel Kovtunov handed his command of the division to Col. Aleksey Avkcentevich Kuzenny. This officer was in turn replaced on 26 January 1945 by Col. Ivan Sergeevich Lobanov, who was succeeded on 14 February by Col. Andrei Prokofevich Maltzev. Just two weeks later Maj. Gen. Nikita Sergeevich Samokhvalov took over command and continued to lead the 88th for the duration of the war.

=== East Prussian Offensive ===
The second attempt to destroy the German forces in East Prussia began on 12 January 1945. The objective of 3rd Belorussian Front was much as before: to penetrate the defenses north of the Masurian Lakes in the Insterburg region and then advance to launch a frontal attack on Königsberg. 31st Army remained on the Front's left flank and in the early going was ordered to firmly defend the front south of Gołdap. The 88th remained in 71st Corps with the 220th and 331st Rifle Divisions. The Army went over to the offensive on 22 January and by the next day the German grouping facing it was in retreat. During that day the Corps captured the important road junction of Benkheim while the Army developed the offensive toward Angerburg and Lötzen, advancing more than 45 km before storming the heavily fortified strongpoint at the former location. The advance continued during the following days and on 31 January the division helped to take Heilsberg and Friedland. On 5 April the 426th Regiment would be recognized for its role in this fighting with the award of the Order of Aleksandr Nevsky.

31st Army resumed its offensive on 2 February and soon captured the major road junction of Landsberg. However this was a crucial point for the German forces attempting to break out of the pocket that was forming around Königsberg. The 129th Infantry and 558th Grenadier and 24th Panzer Divisions launched powerful counterattacks in an effort to encircle the 71st Corps and while they were unable to break into Landsberg they isolated it for several days, bypassing to the north and south and causing considerable havoc in the Soviet rear areas. Once communications were restored the Corps continued its advance in the direction of Kanditten.

During most of February and March the division took part in the final destruction of German 4th Army in the Heiligenbeil Pocket battles. On 24 March Sen. Sergeant Nikolai Mikhailovich Lazkov, an engineer reconnaissance squad leader of the 222nd Sapper Battalion, was made a Hero of the Soviet Union for his work in Belarus from January to June 1944, during which time he led 96 night searches and defused 586 mines with his group. At the start of Operation Bagration, while operating behind enemy lines, his unit captured a bridge over the Orshitsa River north of Orsha and he organized its defense until relieved. He went on to a lengthy career in the postwar Soviet Army, eventually reaching the rank of colonel. On 26 April the 88th was awarded the Order of Kutuzov, 2nd Degree, for its part in the Heiligenbeil fighting.

== Postwar ==
By this time the division was travelling by train south with the rest of 31st Army to join the 1st Ukrainian Front in the Sudeten Mountains of Czechoslovakia. Arriving in the first days of May the 71st Corps saw little action, primarily providing flank security to the Front as it advanced on Prague and sweeping up prisoners. When the fighting ended the men and women of the division held the full title of 88th Rifle, Vitebsk, Order of the Red Banner, Order of Suvorov and Kutuzov Division. (Russian: 88-я стрелковая Витебская Краснознамённая орденов Суворова и Кутузова дивизия) According to STAVKA Order No. 11096 of 29 May 1945, part 8, the 88th is listed as one of the rifle divisions to be "disbanded in place". It was disbanded in Czechoslovakia in accordance with the directive during the summer of 1945.
