= Kurt Martti Wallenius =

Finnish major general and writer (1893–1984)

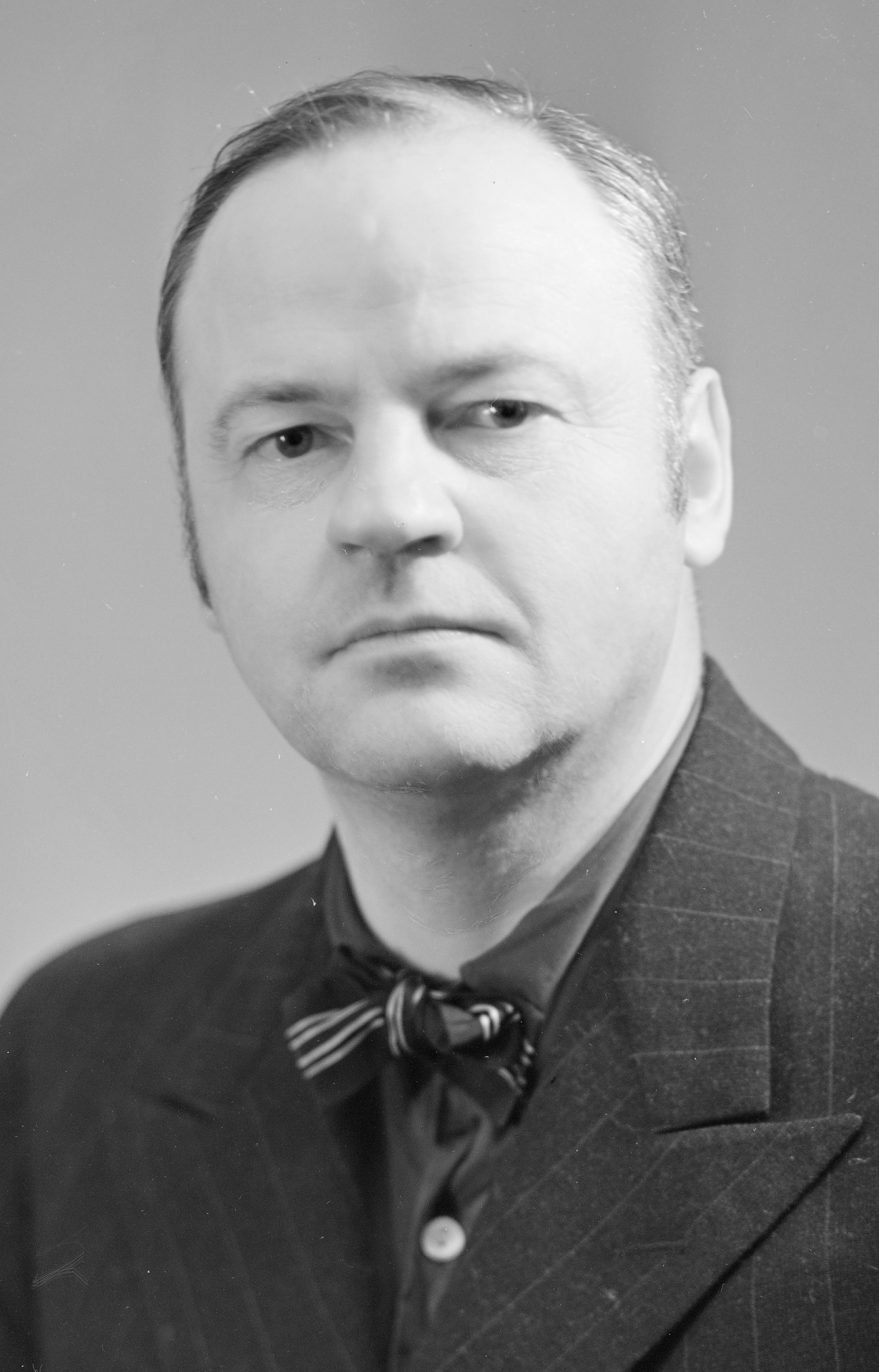
- Wallenius in 1937
- Born: July 25, 1893; Kuopio, Grand Duchy of Finland, Russian Empire
- Died: May 5, 1984 (aged 90); Helsinki, Finland
- Education: University of Helsinki (BA)
- Military career
- Allegiance: German Empire; Finnish Whites; Finland
- Branch: Army
- Service years: c. 1915 (Germany); 1918–1930, 1940 (Finland)
- Rank: Major; Major general
- Units: 27th Jäger Battalion; White Guard
- Commands: Chief of the General Staff of the Finnish Army (c. 1926–1930); Lapland Group (1940)
- Conflicts: First World War; Finnish Civil War; Heimosodat; Viena expedition; Petsamo expeditions; Mäntsälä rebellion (POW); Second World War; Winter War
- Other work: Secretary-general of the Lapua Movement · author

Kurt Martti Wallenius (25 July 1893 in Kuopio – 5 May 1984 in Helsinki) was a Finnish major general and writer. He served as Chief of the General Staff of Finland from 1925 to 1930 and as commander of the Lapland Group at the start of the Winter War. Wallenius was active in the far-right Lapua movement and was convicted for his role as a leader of the Mäntsälä rebellion in 1932. After his military career ended he became a prominent author whose depictions of Lapland and the Arctic Ocean are regarded as classics of northern literature.

== Early life and education ==
Wallenius was the son of a bank manager, later bank director, in Kuopio. He completed his matriculation examination at the Kuopio Classical Lyceum in 1912 and obtained a Bachelor of Arts degree from the University of Helsinki in 1915, before continuing to a Master of Arts degree with aesthetics as his main subject. He then changed course entirely and joined the Jäger movement as a soldier.

== Jäger Movement and Civil War ==
In 1915, Wallenius travelled to Germany where he enrolled in the Royal Prussian 27th Jäger Battalion. He took part in the battles on the Misa River.

After returning to Finland, Wallenius took part in the Finnish Civil War of 1918 on the side of the anti-Communist Whites. He commanded a platoon in Tervola and Tornio. In February 1918, Wallenius presided over the executions of five Russians in Tornio, including a diplomat. In Lapland, Wallenius met reindeer herder Aleksi Hihnavaara, with whom he travelled around Lapland, and the two became good friends.

That same year he was promoted to captain and made commander of the front in Lapland and head of the Civil Guard in northern Finland. From March to October 1918 he led the troops on the northeastern border, including as leader of the Viena expedition against the Murmansk Legion. Later in 1918 he was promoted to major and given command of the Salla Regiment, the 1st Lapland Border Guard Battalion, and the Lapland Border Guard (1918–1921).

== Operations in the northeast ==
On the northeastern front, Wallenius helped plan and lead expeditions across the eastern border. He commanded the expedition to White Karelia and served as commander of the second Petsamo Expedition in 1920. His ambitiously conceived operations ended in failure, however. White Karelia was never annexed, and the expedition planned to clear Petsamo shrank to a foray of some sixty men into Soviet Russian territory and ended in defeat – in Wallenius's view because of a military leadership that did not understand conditions in Lapland.

== General Staff and promotion ==
From 1923 to 1925, Wallenius attended a general staff course at the war academy in Berlin. He was subsequently appointed head of the operative department of the General Staff and then Chief of the General Staff – initially temporarily and from 1927 in a permanent capacity. He was promoted to colonel in 1926 and to major general in 1930. As Chief of the General Staff, Wallenius helped organize and develop the Finnish army during a formative period. In fourteen years, he advanced from non-commissioned officer to general.

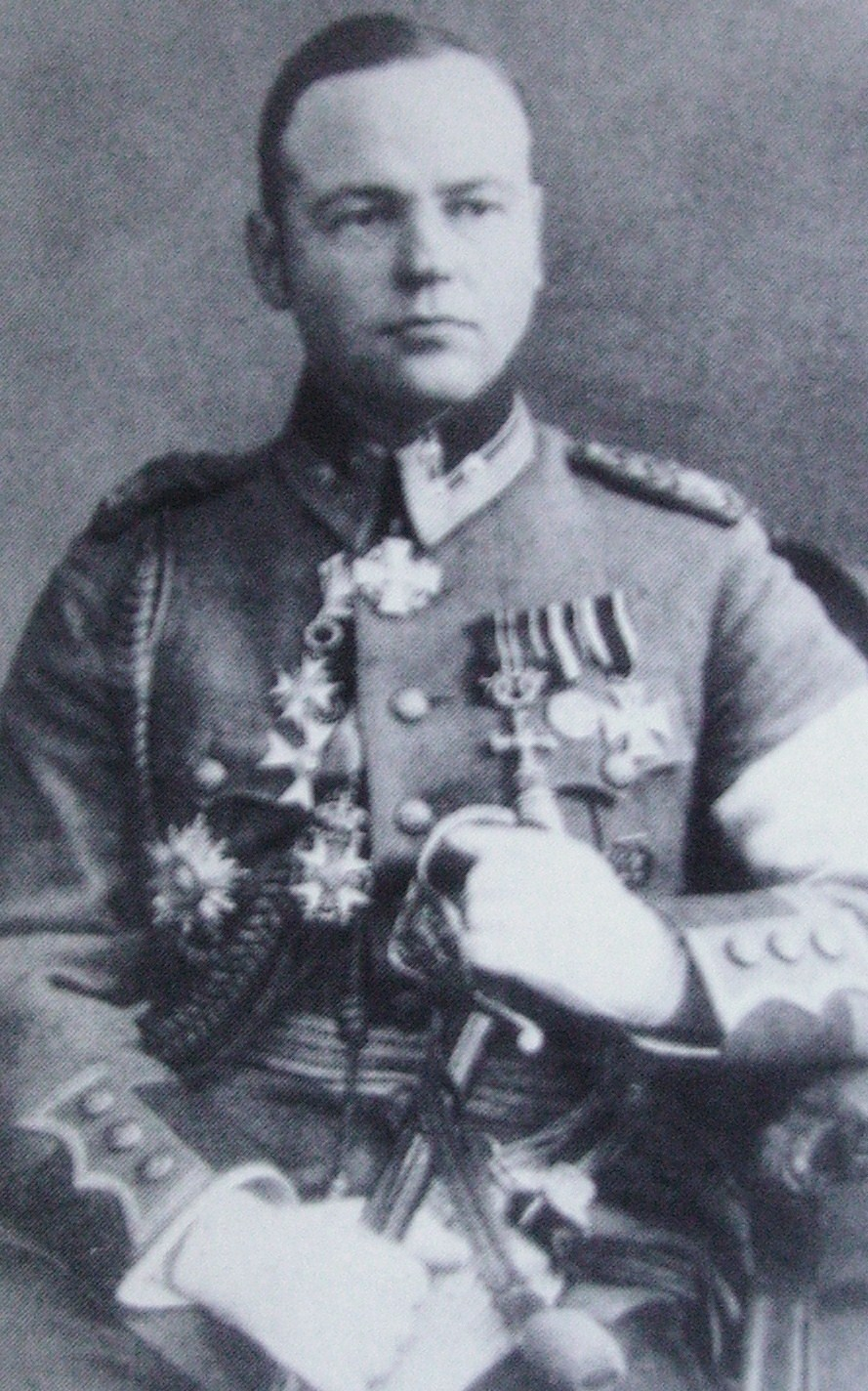
Kurt Wallenius, date unknown

== Political activities and Mäntsälä rebellion ==
Wallenius had political ambitions and was a supporter of the Lapua movement. In autumn 1930, his military career was cut short when he was arrested in connection with the so-called "transport" – the kidnapping of former president Kaarlo Juho Ståhlberg. The Supreme Court of Finland ultimately acquitted him of all charges, but he had been held in pretrial detention in two stages for a total of one and a half years, and the affair tarnished the general's name for decades.

Wallenius served as secretary-general of the Lapua movement in 1931–1932 and became one of the leaders of the Mäntsälä rebellion in 1932. He was again arrested with the other leaders and was released by decision of the court of appeal after seven months in prison.

== Interwar years ==
After his discharge from the army, Wallenius worked from 1935 to 1937 as director of Petsamon Kala Oy and Petsamon öljy- ja kalajauhotehdas Oy, a fish factory and an oil and fishmeal factory in Petsamo. He then served as a war correspondent in China in 1937–1938 and in Germany in 1939.

== Winter War ==
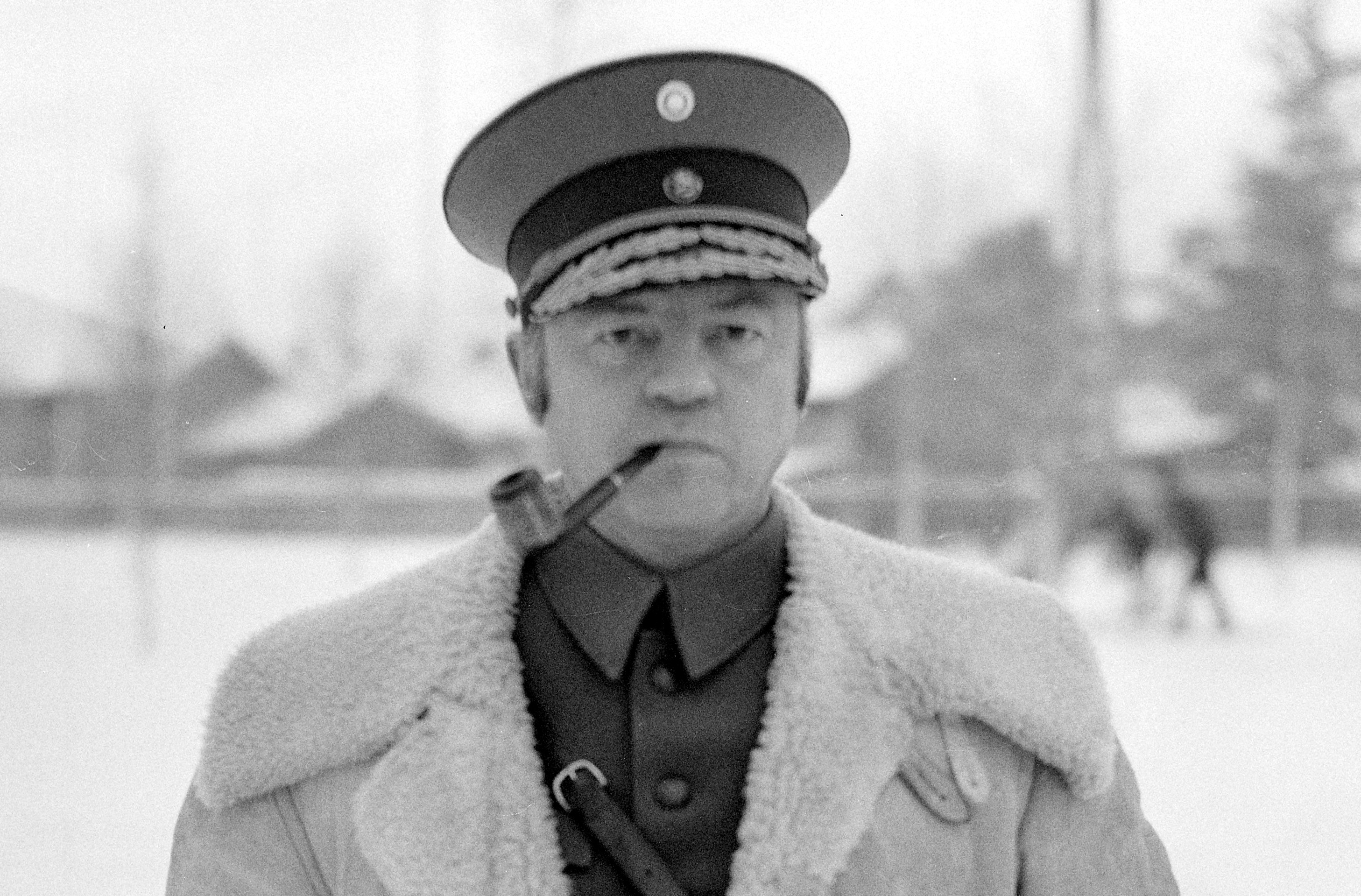
Kenraalimajuri Wallenius in 1940

In the Winter War, the Commander-in-Chief of the Finnish forces, Mannerheim, appointed Wallenius commander of the Lapland Group. The troops under his command, though outnumbered, halted the unexpectedly strong Soviet attack in the north, repulsing Soviet forces at Salla and Petsamo. The general, who became known as the "saviour of Lapland", saw his independent press communiqués cool relations with Mannerheim, however.

Once the front in Lapland had stabilized, Wallenius handed command over to Swedish volunteers under Lieutenant General Ernst Linder in February 1940. He was transferred to the post of commander of the coastal army group on the Bay of Viipuri, where the Red Army had crossed the frozen gulf. The situation was critical and the terrain very different from what Wallenius and his men were used to. Wallenius failed to prevent the Red Army from gaining a foothold on the western shore of the bay. In early March 1940, after only a few days in command, he was transferred to the reserve and replaced by Lieutenant General Karl Lennart Oesch. He never received another command.

== Later life and writing ==
After the Winter War in 1940, Wallenius moved with his family to Lapland and became a full-time writer. Once the Continuation War began in June 1941, he failed to obtain a command and lived in retirement in Rovaniemen maalaiskunta. Known as "the cantankerous old man of Marrasjärvi", the writer-general became one of the most important authors of Lapland.

Wallenius's most acclaimed works appeared in the 1950s. Vanhat kalajumalat (1951, "Old fish gods") is a documentary wilderness portrayal of eastern Lapland infused with personal philosophy. Miesten meri (1952; Swedish translation Ishavets män, 1954) is regarded as his masterpiece and introduced the shores of the Arctic Ocean to Finnish literature. His final novel, Makreeta, merensoutajan vaimo (1959), tells of women's hard lives on the shores of the Arctic Ocean and of the history of Finns in Finnmark.

A wide-ranging visionary study of the history of Petsamo, written in 1944, was prevented from publication by the terms of the peace treaty and appeared posthumously in 1994 under the title Petsamo: mittaamattomien mahdollisuuksien maa.
