= Battle of Petsamo =

1939 Winter War battle in Finland

- Part of Winter War
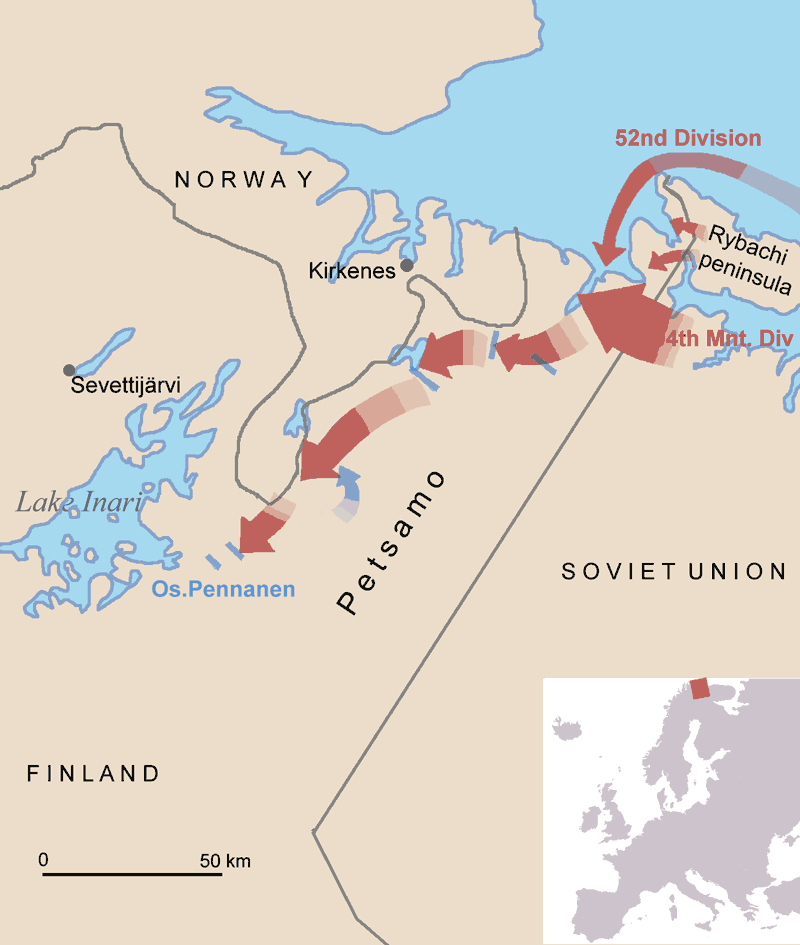
- Map of the operations in Petsamo in 1939 and 1940
Date	30 November 1939 – 12 March 1940
Location	Petsamo, Finland 69°15′N 30°34′E
Result	Soviet victory

Belligerents
Finland	Soviet Union

Commanders and leaders
Antti Pennanen	Kirill Meretskov; Valerian Frolov

Strength
Three companies	Two divisions

Casualties and losses
89 dead, 135 wounded, 16 captured	181 dead, 301 wounded, 72 captured
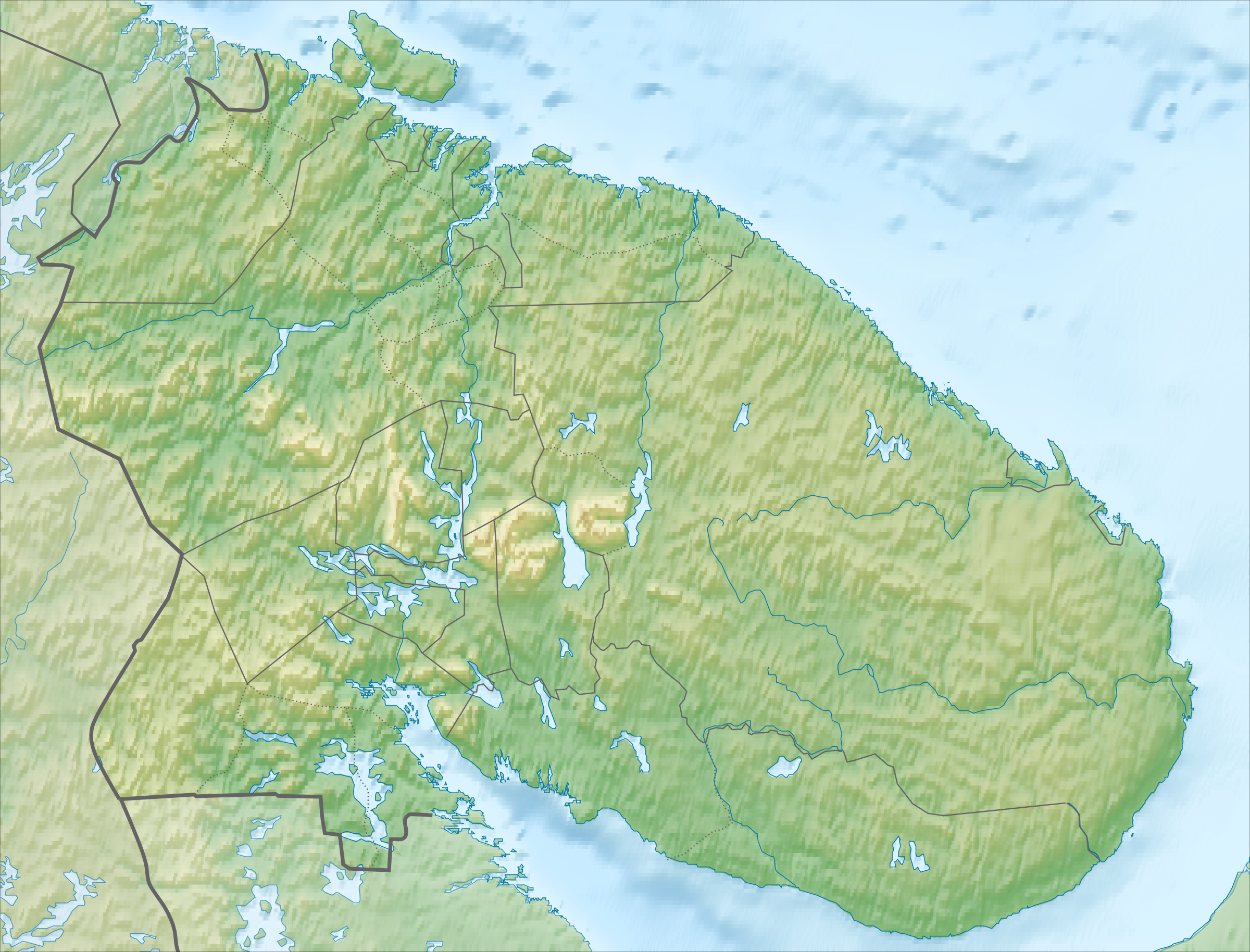
- Location within Murmansk Oblast Battle of Petsamo (Finland)

The Battle of Petsamo was fought between Finnish and Soviet troops in the area of Petsamo in the far north of Finland in 1939 and 1940. The Finnish troops were greatly outnumbered but managed to contain the Soviet troops due to the extreme terrain, weather and leadership.

== Order of battle ==
=== Finland ===
The Finnish troops consisted of the 10th Separate Company (10.Er.K) in Parkkina and the 5th Separate Battery (5.Er.Ptri, four 76 mm field cannons, from year 1887) in Liinahamari. The separate companies and batteries didn't belong to any specific division of the Finnish Army and could be placed in ad hoc formations. The troops were part of the Lapland Group (Lapin Ryhmä) of the Finnish Army which had its headquarters at Rovaniemi. The troops were later reinforced with the 11th Separate Company and a 3rd Company which wasn't part of the original mobilization plans. Also the small Reconnaissance Detachment 11 (Tiedusteluosasto 11) was added to the troops. All the troops were called Detachment Pennanen (Osasto Pennanen, totalling under 900 men) after their commander Antti Pennanen.

=== Soviet Union ===
The Soviet Union had the 14th Army in the Kola Peninsula. The army consisted of three divisions, the 104th, 52nd and the 14th, operational power totalling ca. 52,500 men. Only the 104th and 52nd Divisions took part in the field operations in Petsamo, 14th occupying Liinahamari harbour.

The Soviets quickly took over the port and secured it from any third party intervention.

== The battle ==
Elements of the 104th Division crossed the border on 30 November 1939 and occupied the Finnish part of the Rybachi Peninsula. The 242nd Infantry Regiment of the 104th Division reached Parkkina on 1 December.

According to Chew, "By the middle of the month the strong elements of the 104th Division which were pursuing the weak Finnish force down the Arctic Highway from Petsamo had captured the nickel mines at Salmijärvi, and a few days later reached the vicinity of Nautsi. There the Finnish forces, which had been brought up to battalion strength, made a successful stand in the hilly country, driving the numerically superior enemy back a few miles to Höyhenjärvi on 21 December."

After the two-month pause the Soviet advance continued and this time attacks on 25 February forced the Finnish troops to Nautsi near Lake Inari. Here the troops stayed until the end of the war.

== The Peace ==
On 12 March, 1940, the Moscow Peace Treaty was concluded and Finland was forced to cede parts of her territory to the Soviet Union. Among these areas was Viipuri and the northern port of Petsamo, as well as the entire Karelian isthmus. The Soviet Union would take the entire province of Petsamo after the Continuation War.

== See also ==
- Operation Platinfuchs
- List of Finnish military equipment of World War II
- List of Soviet Union military equipment of World War II
