= Sárkeresztúr =

- Village
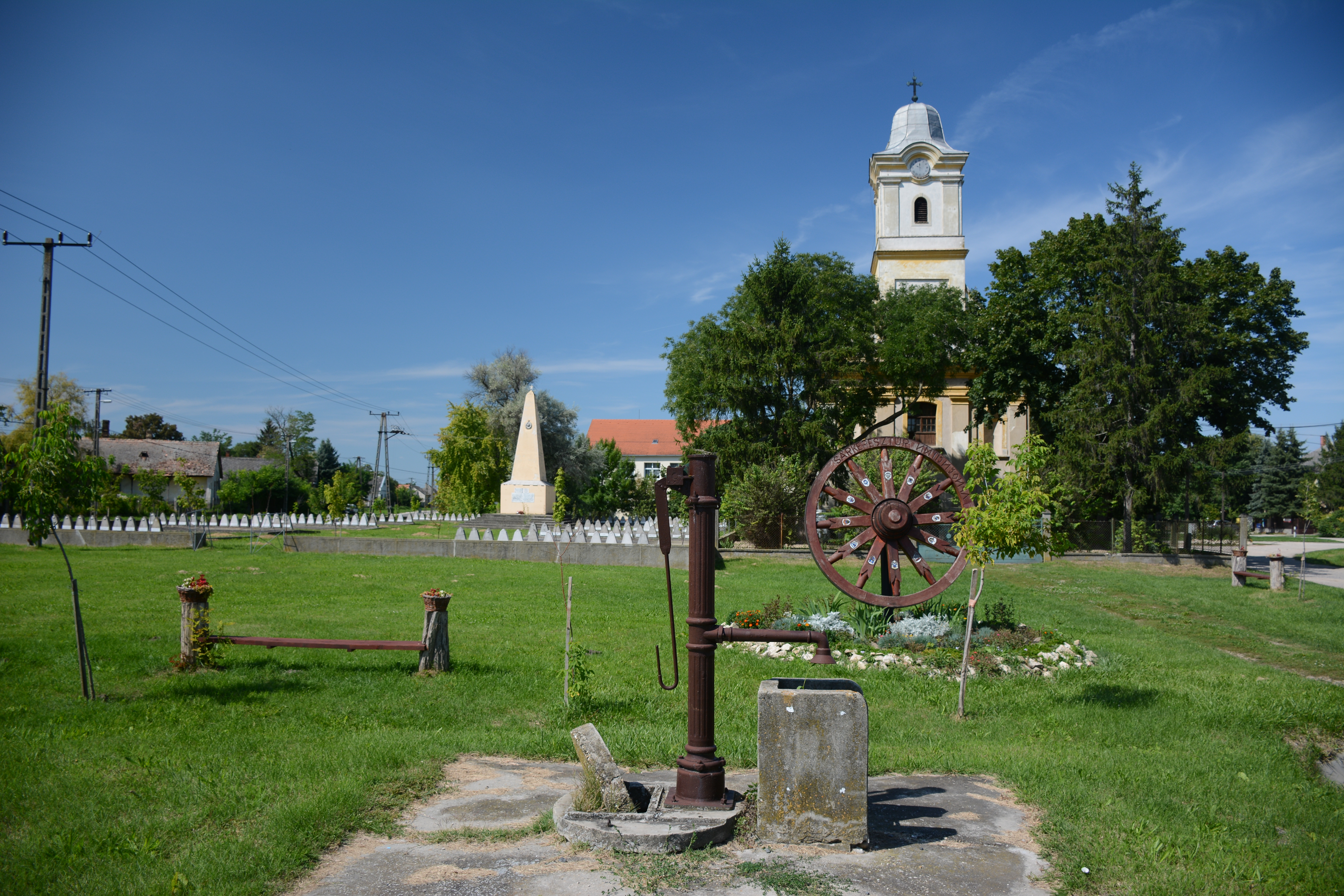
- Church in Sárkeresztúr

- Flag Coat of arms

- Location of Sárkeresztúr
- Coordinates: 47.00242°N 18.54768°E
- Country: Hungary
- Region: Central Transdanubia
- County: Fejér
- District: Sárbogárd

Area
  - Total: 46.75 km^{2} (18.05 sq mi)

Population (1 January 2026)
  - Total: 2,485
  - Density: 53.16/km^{2} (137.7/sq mi)
- Time zone: UTC+1 (CET)
  - Summer (DST): UTC+2 (CEST)
- Postal code: 8125
- Area code: (+36) 25
- Website: www.sarkeresztur.hu

Sárkeresztúr is a village in Fejér county, Hungary.
