= Lapland Group =

1939 formation of the Finnish Army

The Lapland Group (Lapin Ryhmä) was a formation of the Finnish Army during the Winter War between Finland and the Soviet Union. The group was formed on 13 December 1939 from troops of the North Finland Group. The group was placed under the command of Major General Kurt Martti Wallenius and had its headquarters at Rovaniemi. The forces took part in the Battle of Salla and the Battle of Petsamo.

== Order of battle ==
Osasto Roininen (Detachment Roininen) was located at Salla and consisted of the following forces:

- Separate Battalion 26 (Erillinen Pataljoona 26, Er.P 26)
- Separate Battalion 17 (Erillinen Pataljoona 17, Er.P 17)
- Infantry Regiment 40 (Jalkaväkirykmentti 40, JR 40)
- Two battalions of the "Replacement Brigade" VII/KT-Pr and IX/KT-Pr
- One artillery battery

At the end of February 1940, the troops around Salla were replaced by the Swedish volunteers of the Stridsgruppen SFK

Osasto Pennanen (Detachment Pennanen) which was located in Petsamo consisted of the following forces:

- 10th Separate Company (10. Erillinen Komppania, 10.Er.K)
- 11th Separate Company (11. Erillinen Komppania, 11.Er.K)
- 3rd Company
- 5th Separate Battery (5. Erillinen Patteri, 5.Er.Ptri)
- Reconnaissance Detachment 11 (Tiedusteluosasto 11)
