= Albert Brunner =

German fighter ace and Knight's Cross recipient

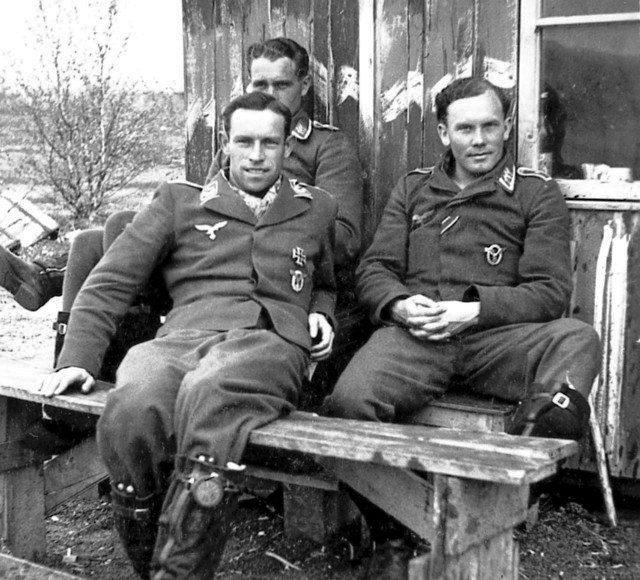
- Brunner (right), next to Heinrich Ehrler
- Born: 17 July 1918; Mergentheim
- Died: 7 May 1943 (aged 24); Petsamo, Finland
- Cause of death: Killed in action
- Military career
- Allegiance: Nazi Germany
- Branch: Luftwaffe
- Service years: 1939–1943
- Rank: Oberfeldwebel (staff sergeant)
- Unit: Jagdgeschwader 5
- Conflicts: World War II
- Awards: Knight's Cross of the Iron Cross

Albert Brunner (17 July 1918 – 7 May 1943) was a German Luftwaffe ace and recipient of the Knight's Cross of the Iron Cross during World War II. Brunner claimed 53 aerial victories, all over the Eastern Front. The Knight's Cross of the Iron Cross, and its variants were the highest awards in the military and paramilitary forces of Nazi Germany during World War II.

== Career ==
Brunner was born on 17 July 1918 in Dörtel, present-day part of Bad Mergentheim, at the time in the Kingdom of Württemberg within the German Empire. He joined the military service of the Luftwaffe in 1939. Following completion of flight and fighter pilot training, (Note: Flight training in the Luftwaffe progressed through the levels A1, A2 and B1, B2, referred to as A/B flight training. A training included theoretical and practical training in aerobatics, navigation, long-distance flights and dead-stick landings. The B courses included high-altitude flights, instrument flights, night landings and training to handle the aircraft in difficult situations.) Brunner was transferred to Ergänzungs-Jagdgruppe West, a fighter pilot training unit, where he served as an instructor. In April 1942, he was transferred to II. Gruppe (2nd group) of Jagdgeschwader 5 (JG 5—5th Fighter Wing) and assigned to 6. Staffel (6th squadron). At the time, 6. Staffel was commanded by Oberleutnant Horst Carganico, while II. Gruppe of JG 5 was headed by Major Hennig Strümpell. The Staffel was based at an airfield at Petsamo, present-day Pechenga in Murmansk Oblast, Soviet Union on the Eismeerfront (Ice Sea Front)—the area of operations nearest the Arctic Ocean. On 1 June, Strümpell was transferred and command of II. Gruppe was given to Carganico. In consequence, 6. Staffel command was passed on to Oberleutnant Hans-Diether Hartwein. During this period, II. Gruppe received the Messerschmitt Bf 109 F-4. Training on this aircraft was done in small groups at Pori Airfield in Finland.

=== War on the Arctic Front ===
On 29 May 1942, Brunner claimed his first aerial victory. Scrambled at 23:20, he shot down a Hawker Hurricane fighter south of Nautsi shortly after. Brunner claimed his second aerial victory on 24 June, another Hurricane, while escorting Junkers Ju 88 bombers to Murmansk. On 5 September during operations against the Arctic convoy PQ 18, Brunner claimed two aerial victories. However, his Bf 109 F-4 trop (Werknummer 10144—factory number) was also hit. (Note: Remnants of Bf 109 F-4 trop (Werknummer 10144) are in Lafayette, Colorado awaiting restoration.) He was last seen in combat near Warlamowo, present-day Severomorsk-1, and reported as missing in action. However, Brunner had bailed out and returned to his unit on 9 September.

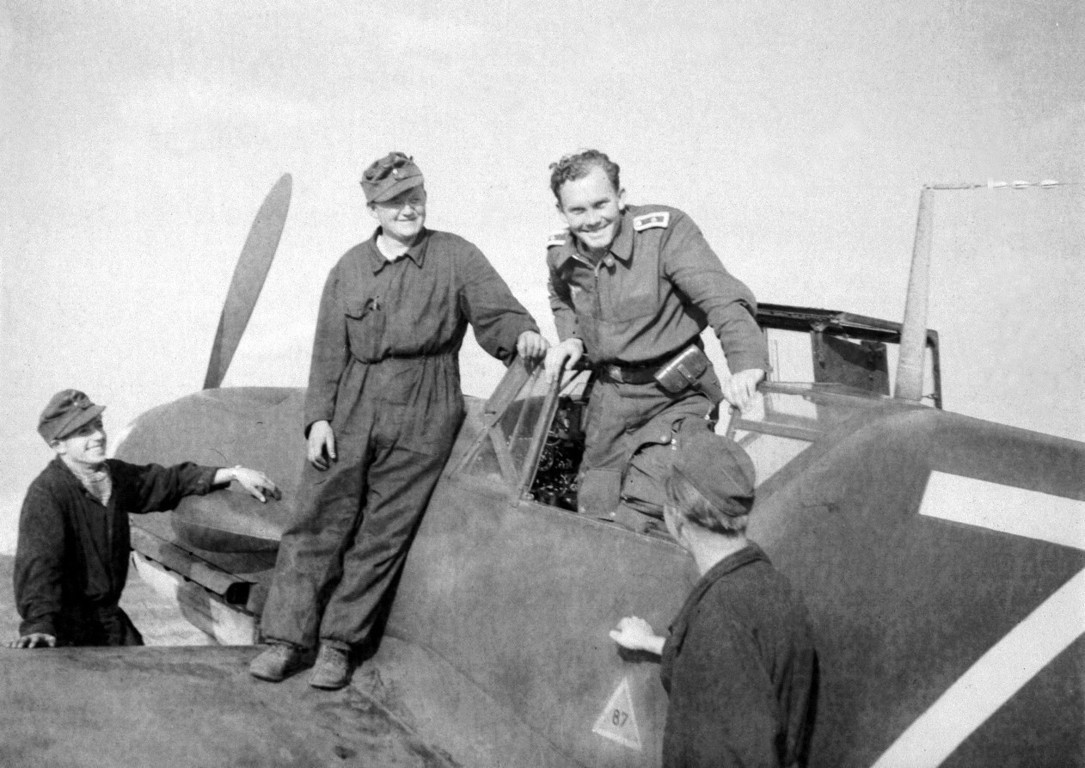
Brunner exiting Bf 109 F-4 trop (Werknummer 10144)

On 23 March 1943, on a mission to Murmansk, Brunner claimed a Curtiss P-40 Warhawk fighter shot down. On 4 April, following aerial combat with Bell P-39 Airacobra fighters, Brunner made a crash landing in his Bf 109 G-2 (Werknummer 13923). Following these events, he was picked up by Oberfeldwebel Rudolf Müller who flew back to Petsamo and returned with a Fieseler Fi 156 Storch. During this period, Brunner was awarded the Honor Goblet of the Luftwaffe (Ehrenpokal der Luftwaffe) on 12 April. On 22 April, 6. Staffel flew a combat air patrol to the area north of Murmansk, up to the Kildin Island. On this mission, Brunner claimed a P-40 and a misidentified North American P-51 Mustang fighter, the P-51 was never deployed in this theater. His opponents belonged to 769 IAP PVO (Fighter Aviation Regiment—Istrebitelny Aviatsionny Polk; Home Air Defense—Prozivo-Vozdushnaya Oborona), which reported three P-40s lost.

Brunner was killed in action on 7 May 1943 near Petsamo, Finland. Following combat with P-39s, he was forced to bail out of his Bf 109 G-2 (Werknummer 14802) approximately 2 kilometers (1.2 miles) southwest of Groß Venedigerberg, a German name for a hill east of Pechenga. Too low for his parachute to fully deploy, he fell to his death. That day, 15 Bf 109s from II. and III. Gruppe had taken off at 03:25 to escort eight Ju 88 bombers and ten Messerschmitt Bf 110 and Focke-Wulf Fw 190 ground-attack aircraft on a mission to Murmansk. At approximately 04:00, a Luftwaffe flight of Bf 109s engaged in aerial combat with six P-39s from 2 GvSAP (Guards Composite Aviation Regiment—Gvardeyskiy Smeshannyy Aviatsionnyy Polk). In this encounter, Brunner claimed his 53rd and last aerial victory but his aircraft was also hit. His victor may have been Leytenant Nikolai Andreevich Bokii. His body was recovered by the infantry and buried at the German war cemetery Petschenga-Parkkina, located approximately 60 kilometers (37 miles) southeast of Kirkenes. Posthumously, Brunner was awarded the German Cross in Gold (Deutsches Kreuz in Gold) on 4 June and the Knight’s Cross of the Iron Cross (Ritterkreuz des Eisernen Kreuzes) on 3 July 1943.

== Summary of career ==
=== Aerial victory claims ===
According to US historian David T. Zabecki, Brunner was credited with 53 aerial victories. Obermaier also lists him with 53 aerial victories claimed in 135 combat missions, all of which claimed on the Eastern Front. Spick states that Brunner had a mission-to-claim ratio of 2.55. Mathews and Foreman, authors of Luftwaffe Aces — Biographies and Victory Claims, researched the German Federal Archives and also state that he was credited with 53 aerial victory claims.

Chronicle of aerial victories
This and the ? (exclamation mark) indicates information discrepancies listed by Prien, Stemmer, Rodeike, Bock, Mombeek, Mathews, and Foreman.
Claim	Date	Time	Type	Location	Claim	Date	Time	Type	Location
– 6. Staffel of Jagdgeschwader 5 – Eastern Front and northern Norway, and Finland — 6 December 1941 – 31 December 1942
1	29 May 1942	23:20	Hurricane	20 km (12 mi) south of Nautsi	4	18 July 1942	—	P-40	20 km (12 mi) north of Murmansk
2	24 June 1942	—	Hurricane	10 km (6.2 mi) west of Kola	5	19 July 1942	—	P-40	10 km (6.2 mi) southwest of Shonguy
3	7 July 1942	—	Hurricane	6 km (3.7 mi) southwest of Murmansk	6	19 July 1942	—	Hurricane	5 km (3.1 mi) west of Kola
According to Prien, Stemmer, Rodeike and Bock, Brunner claimed three undocumented aerial victories in July and August 1942. These claims are neither listed by Mombeek nor by Mathews and Foreman.
10	22 August 1942	—	P-39						
According to Prien, Stemmer, Rodeike and Bock, Brunner claimed two undocumented aerial victories in August and September 1942. These claims are neither listed by Mombeek nor by Mathews and Foreman.
13	5 September 1942	—	unknown		14	5 September 1942	—	unknown	
According to Prien, Stemmer, Rodeike and Bock, Brunner claimed twelve to fifteen undocumented aerial victories in January to April 1943. These claims are neither listed by Mombeek nor by Mathews and Foreman.
	23 March 1943	14:20	P-40	vicinity of Shonguy	46	13 April 1943	—	P-40	10 km (6.2 mi) east of Murmansk
39	4 April 1943	—	Hurricane? (Note: According to Mombeek claimed as a Curtiss P-40 Warhawk.)		47	19 April 1943	—	P-40	3 km (1.9 mi) east of Murmansk
40	4 April 1943	—	P-40? (Note: According to Mombeek claimed as a Bell P-39 Airacobra.)	vicinity of Pechenga	48	17 April 1943	—	P-40	17 km (11 mi) east of Kolo
41	4 April 1943	—	P-40?	vicinity of Pechenga	49	22 April 1943	—	P-51	5 km (3.1 mi) east of Murmansk
42	4 April 1943	—	P-40	vicinity of Pechenga	50	22 April 1943	—	P-40	10 km (6.2 mi) east of Murmansk
43	13 April 1943	—	Hurricane	vicinity of Murmashi	51	29 April 1943	—	P-39	
44	13 April 1943	—	Hurricane	vicinity of Murmashi	52	30 April 1943	—	P-40	
45	13 April 1943	—	Hurricane	vicinity of Murmashi	53	7 May 1943	—	P-39	east of Pechenga

=== Awards ===
- Iron Cross (1939) 2nd and 1st Class
- Honour Goblet of the Luftwaffe on 12 April 1943 as Oberfeldwebel and pilot
- German Cross in Gold on 4 June 1943 as Oberfeldwebel in the 6./Jagdgeschwader 5
- Knight's Cross of the Iron Cross on 3 July 1943 as Oberfeldwebel and pilot in the 6./Jagdgeschwader 5
