= Arctic Ocean Highway =

Road in Finland

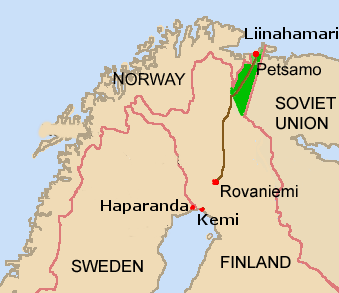
Arctic Ocean Highway. Petsamo area on green.

Arctic Ocean Highway (Finnish: Jäämerentie, Swedish: Ishavsvägen, German: Eismeerstraße) was a 531 kilometre-long highway in Lapland, Finland connecting the town of Rovaniemi to the port of Liinakhamari by the Pechenga Bay of the Barents Sea. It was opened in 1931 as the first highway in the world reaching the Arctic Ocean.

Arctic Ocean Highway and the Liinakhamari port became vital during the World War II in 1940–1941 as the only export route for Finland and Sweden not controlled by Nazi Germany or the Soviet Union. After the war, Finland ceded the area of the former Petsamo Province to the Soviet Union and thereby lost its connection to the Arctic Ocean. The highway was rerouted and today it is a part of the Finnish national road 4 leading to Norway.

== History ==
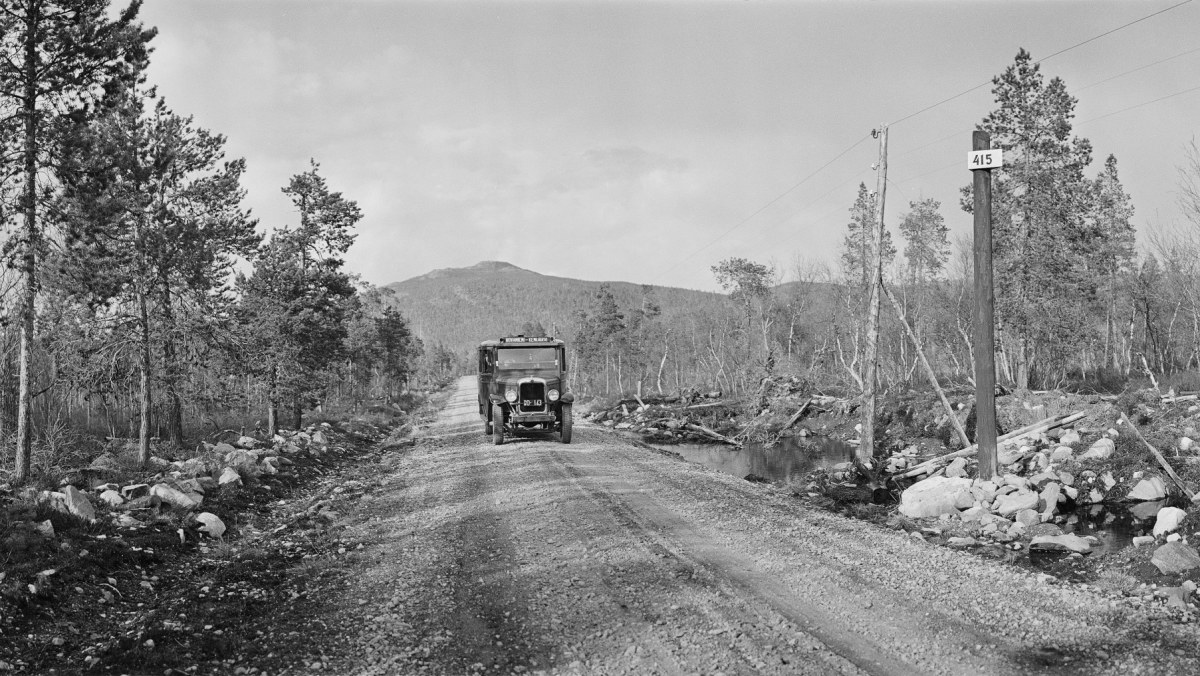
Bus on the Arctic Ocean Highway in 1934

=== Construction ===
The Arctic Ocean Highway was mostly built on the tracks of the 16th Century Finnmark Path which connected the Finnish Lapland to the Finnmark county of Norway. In the early 1900s, the northernmost point of the Finnish roads was in the village of Tankavaara, 225 kilometres north of Rovaniemi. The road to Ivalo was finished in 1913 and the construction of a new road to Petsamo was launched in 1916 by the order of the emperor Nicholas II of Russia. After the 1917 Independence of Finland, the old narrow routes were widened to the width of 5 metres and the new Petsamo Highway was finally opened in its full length in 1931, renamed as the Arctic Ocean Highway. During the 1930s, the traffic grew rapidly as the Petsamo nickel mines were opened, and Liinahamari soon became one of the major ports of Finland. It was the only year-round ice-free harbour in Finland.

=== The war time ===
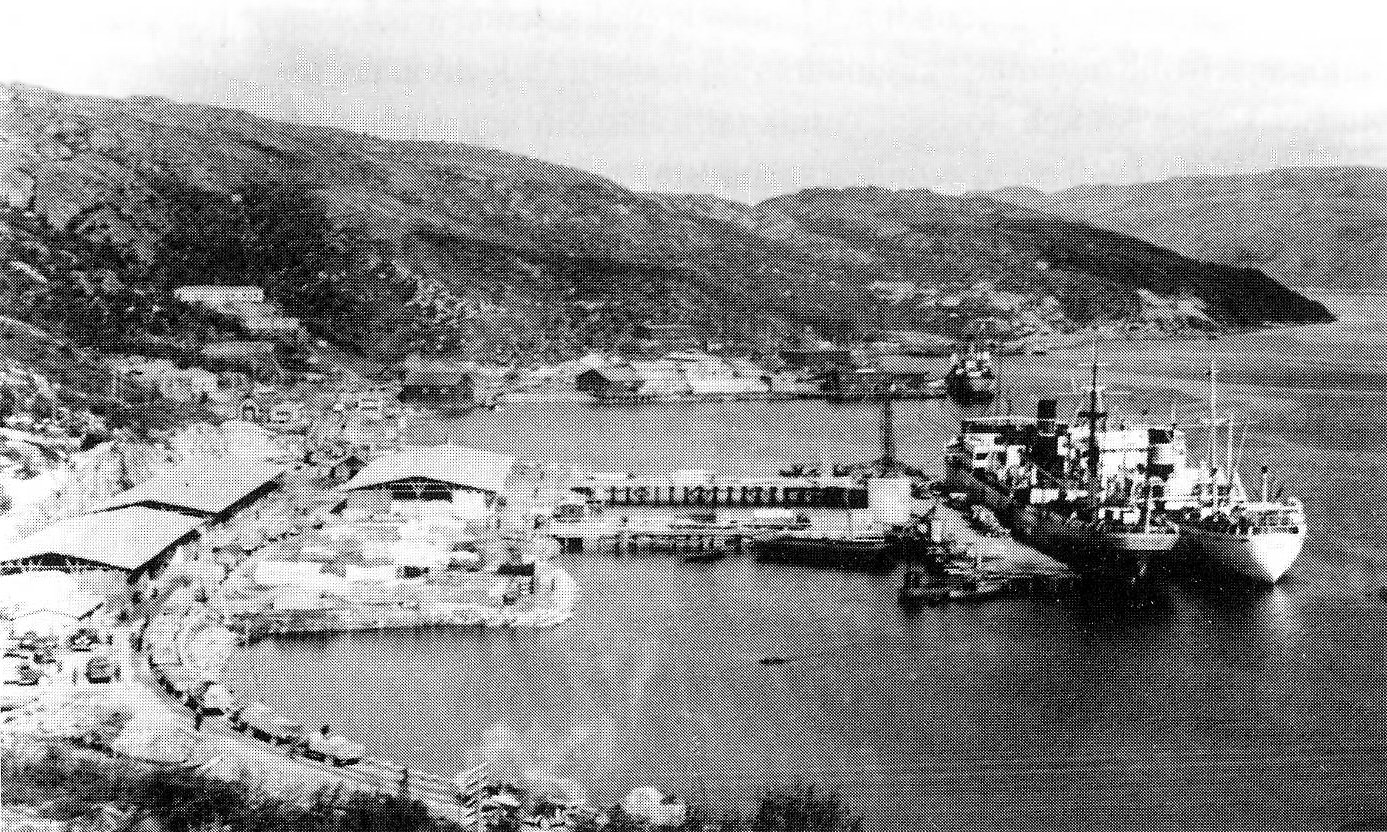
Liinakhamari port in 1940 or 1941 with trucks waiting on a line

In 1940–1941, the Arctic Ocean Highway was vital for Finland, and also played an important role for Sweden, as the Baltic Sea was controlled by the Nazis and the Russians. Between the autumn of 1940 and summer of 1941, more than 4,000 men with 1,600 trucks were driving cargo on the highway. The number of workers also included 1,000 mechanics and 1,400 men for road maintenance. The Swedes were transporting their own cargo with 400 trucks. The drivers were working long hours on a narrow and busy road, and almost 100 truckers were killed in accidents. In a year-long period, totals transported were 340,000 tons of export and 180,000 tons of import, carried by more than 200 ships. Every ship leaving the Liinakhamari port was checked by the German and British consuls for possible export of war material. In August 1940, nearly 900 Americans living in Northern Europe headed back home via Liinakhamari with the passenger ship American Legion.

In the beginning of June 1941, the Germans started moving their troops to Finland. On 14 June, the Liinakhamari port was blocked by the British Navy, but the Germans managed to transport 40,000 men to Lapland by the Arctic Ocean Highway in order to join the Operation Barbarossa. During the autumn of 1944, the highway was used by the retreating German troops.

=== After the war ===
After the war, Finland ceded the Petsamo area to the Soviet Union and Finland's access to the Arctic Ocean was lost. The Arctic Ocean Highway became a part of the new national road 4. Instead of Petsamo, it headed for Utsjoki and the Norwegian border by the western side of the Lake Inari.
