= Jäniskoski-Niskakoski territory =

Jäniskoski-Niskakoski territory Сектор Янискоски — Нискакоски (Russian)
- District
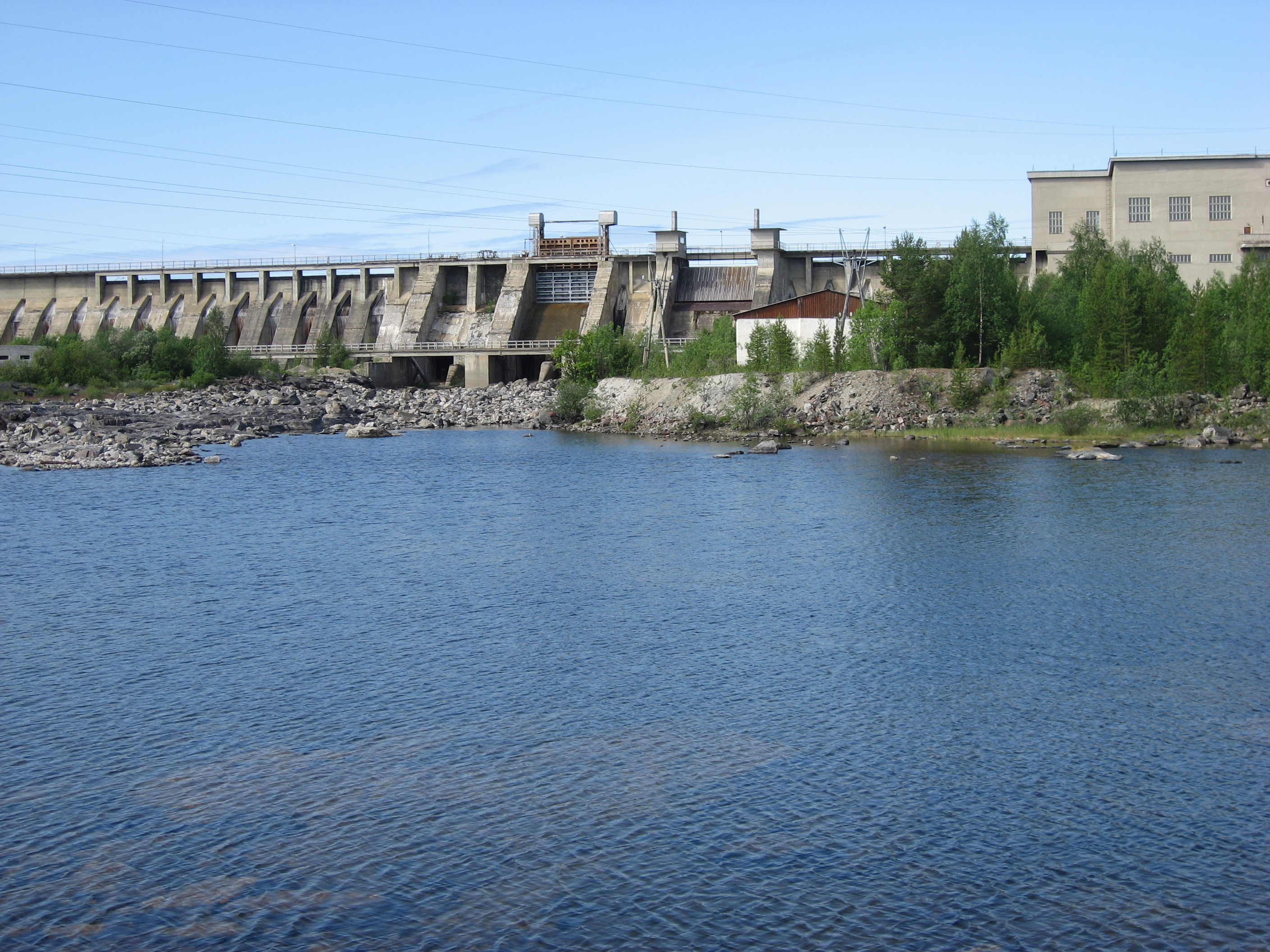
- Jäniskoski hydroelectric plant in 2009

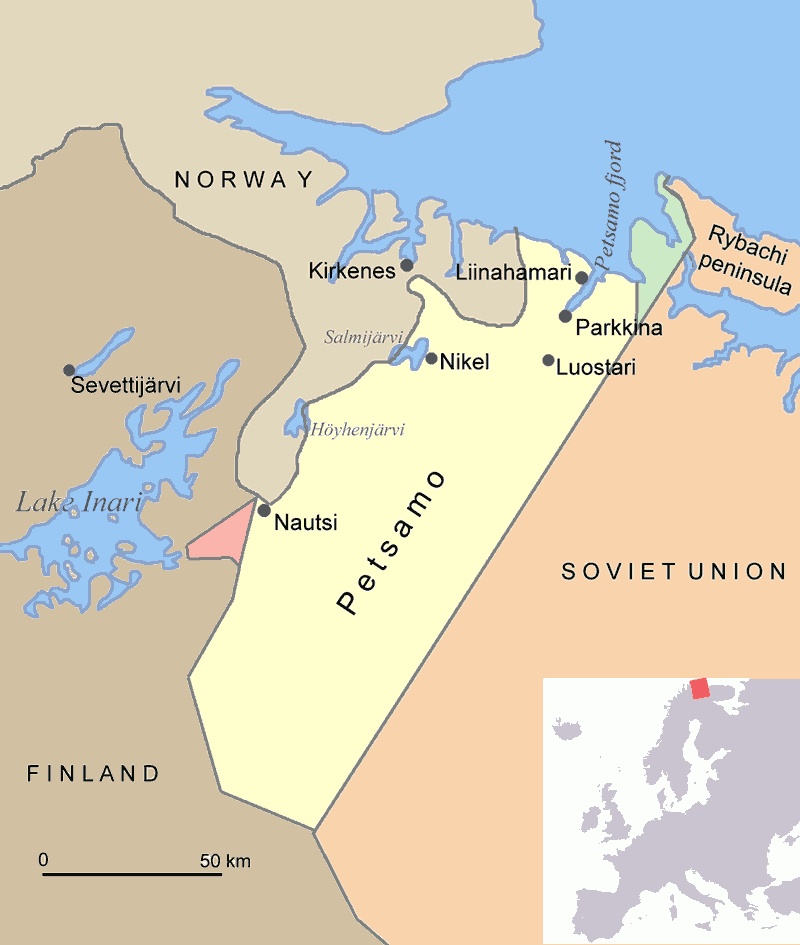
- Jäniskoski-Niskakoski territory
- Coordinates: 68.94°N 28.77°E
- Country: Russia
- Federal subject: Murmansk Oblast
- Established: 18 April 1947

Area
  - Total: 176 km^{2} (68 sq mi)

Municipal structure
  - Municipally incorporated as: Pechengsky District

The Jäniskoski-Niskakoski area is a 176-square-kilometre (68 sq mi) area in Russian Lapland, east of Lake Inari, along the Paatsjoki River. The Jäniskoski-Niskakoski territory is currently incorporated into the Nikel township of the Pechengsky District, Murmansk Oblast.

== History ==
Finland sold the area to the Soviet Union on 18 April 1947 because of Soviet interest in developing the Jäniskoski hydroelectric plant and the Niskakoski reservoir located there.

The Jäniskoski-Niskakoski area was not a part of the Petsamo panhandle territory transferred from Finland to the USSR earlier in 1947, as a result of Continuation War. Instead, the USSR bought the land from Finland via a separate agreement in the same year.

Prior to 1947, while the area belonged to Finland, it was part of the Inari municipality. There was no permanent human population at the time of the sale. The closest human settlement was Nautsi, which was a Nazi concentration camp for Soviet prisoners of war during World War II, who were building there an airport for transcontinental flights between Germany and Japan. Nautsi passed to the USSR earlier in 1944, as a part of the Petsamo transfer, and became abandoned in 1963.

The USSR was interested in the Jäniskoski-Niskakoski territory, because of a hydroelectric power plant formerly located in that area. However, the plant was destroyed by the Wehrmacht in 1944, and Finland did not have interest in restoring this plant because it lost the adjacent nickel mining area in Petsamo to the USSR earlier. It was also believed that Finland could not afford to rebuild the plant at that time. On the other hand, the USSR was interested in acquiring and restoring the hydroelectric power plant to secure the electricity supply of the nickel mine in Petsamo. Finland agreed to sell the area of Jäniskoski-Niskakoski.

In addition to paying 700 million Finnish marks, for this small territory, the USSR paid an undisclosed amount to the Finnish company Imatran Voima, which constructed the original power plant, to rebuild the facility and to build two more hydroelectric power plants on the river Paz in Murmansk Oblast of Russia. Overall, the land sale and power plant construction deal is considered favorable to Finland from the modern historical viewpoint.

The Jäniskoski-Niskakoski territory is currently incorporated into the Nikel township of the Pechengsky District.

== See also ==
- Petsamo Province

== Gallery ==
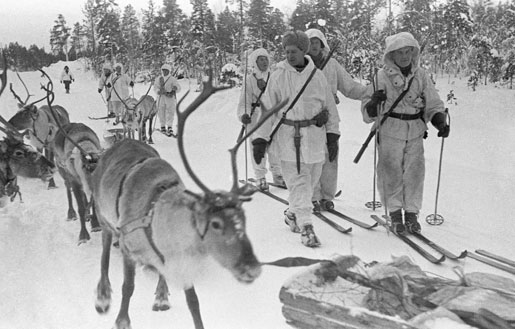
Finnish patrol in Jäniskoski during the Winter War in 1940.

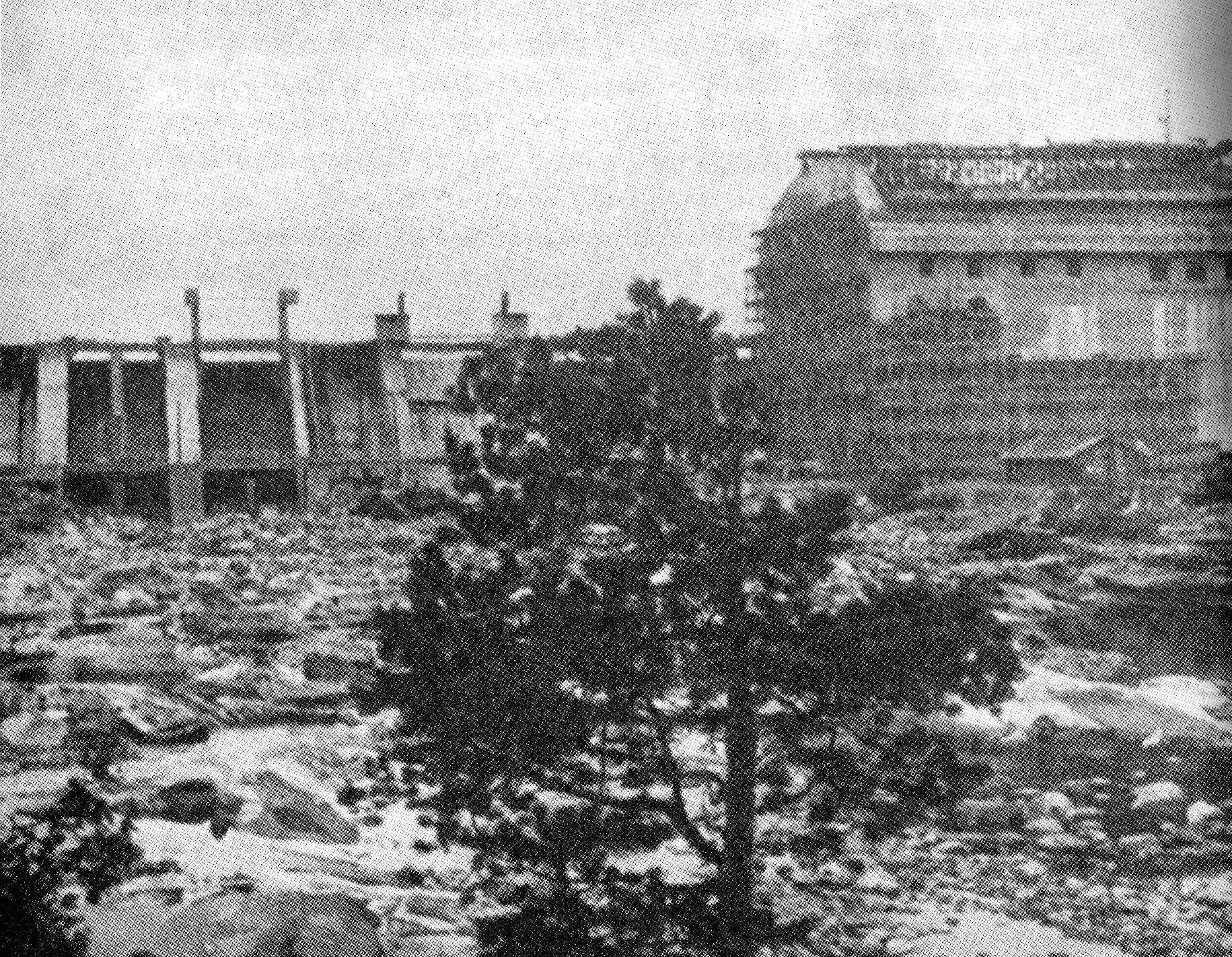
Jäniskoski power plant in 1944. The concrete building on the right is the bomb shelter for the generator hall.

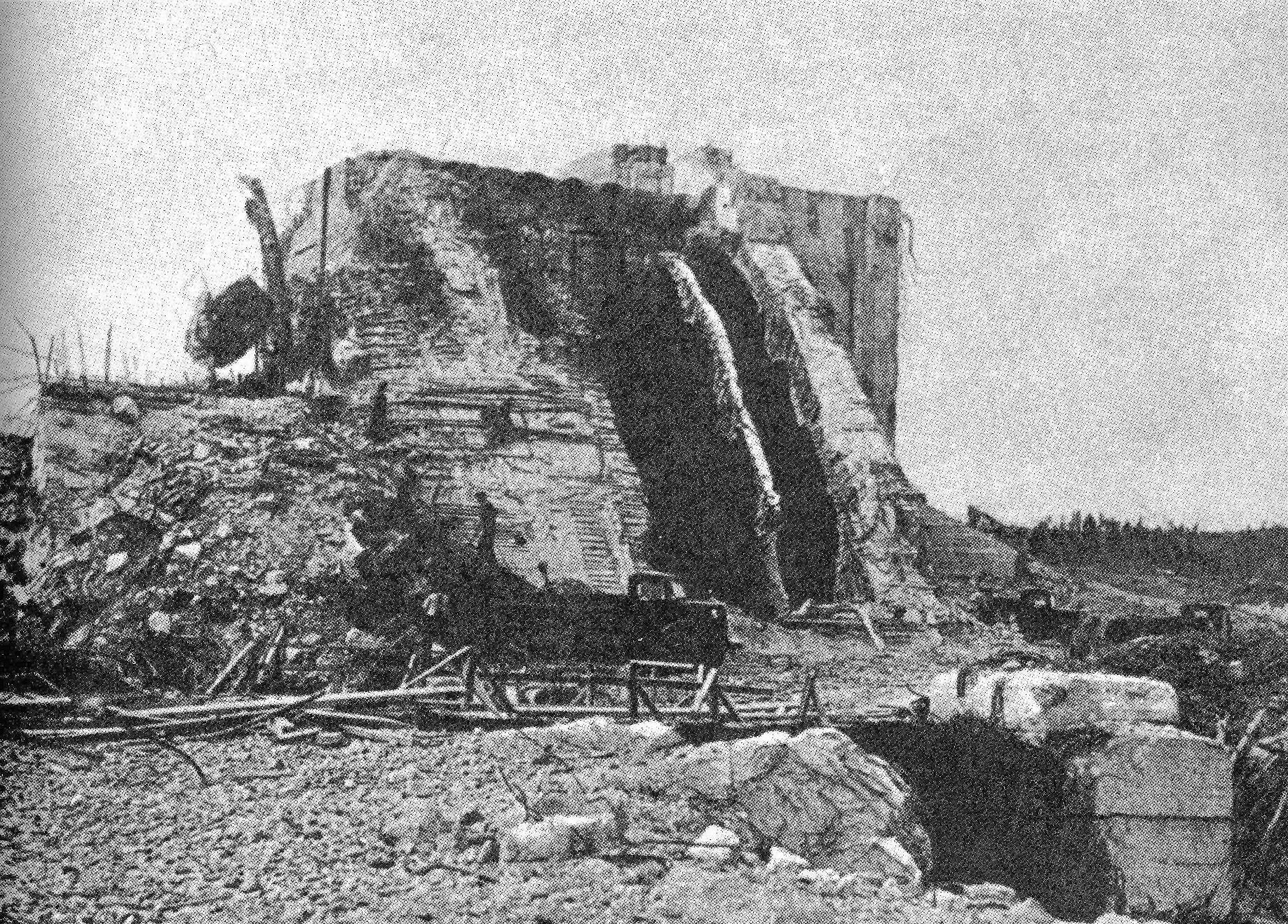
The power plant after being blown up in 1944 during the Lapland War.
