= Nemetsky Peninsula =

Peninsula in Murmansk Oblast, Russia

Coordinates: 69°42′17″N 31°24′33″E

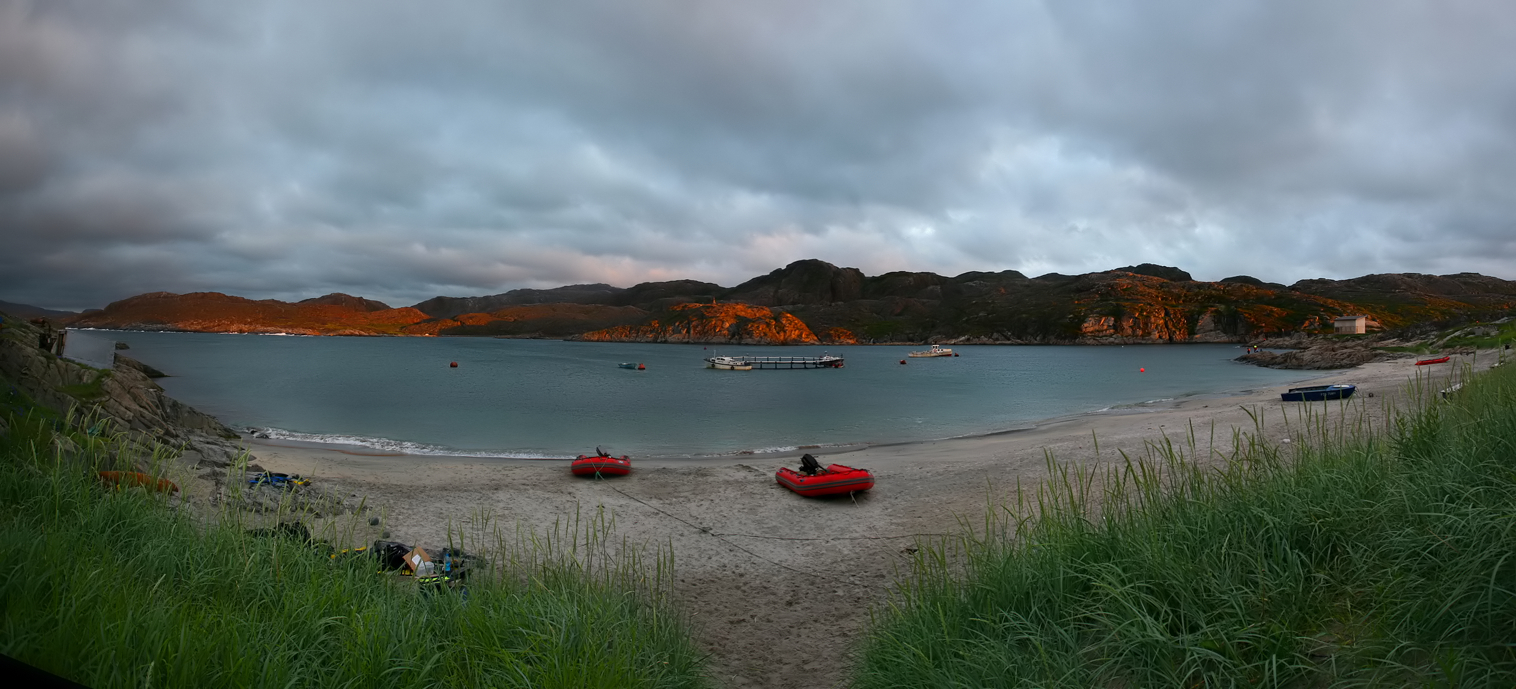

Map of Nemetsky Peninsuloids (in Russian)

Nemetsky Peninsula (Russian: Немецкий полуостров) is a peninsula in the far north region of continental European Russia. Its name is translated as "German peninsula". The peninsula is connected to the continent by a thin isthmus; thus, the peninsula is nearly completely surrounded by water. Administratively, it is included into the Pechenga raion of Murmansk Oblast and is within several hours of ride from Murmansk.

== History ==
After the Russian Revolution, the Nemetsky Peninsula (Finnish: Nurmensaari) was ceded to Finland. The peninsula was passed to the Soviet Union after the Second World War in 1945.
