= Nikel =

Nikel Никель
- Urban-type settlement
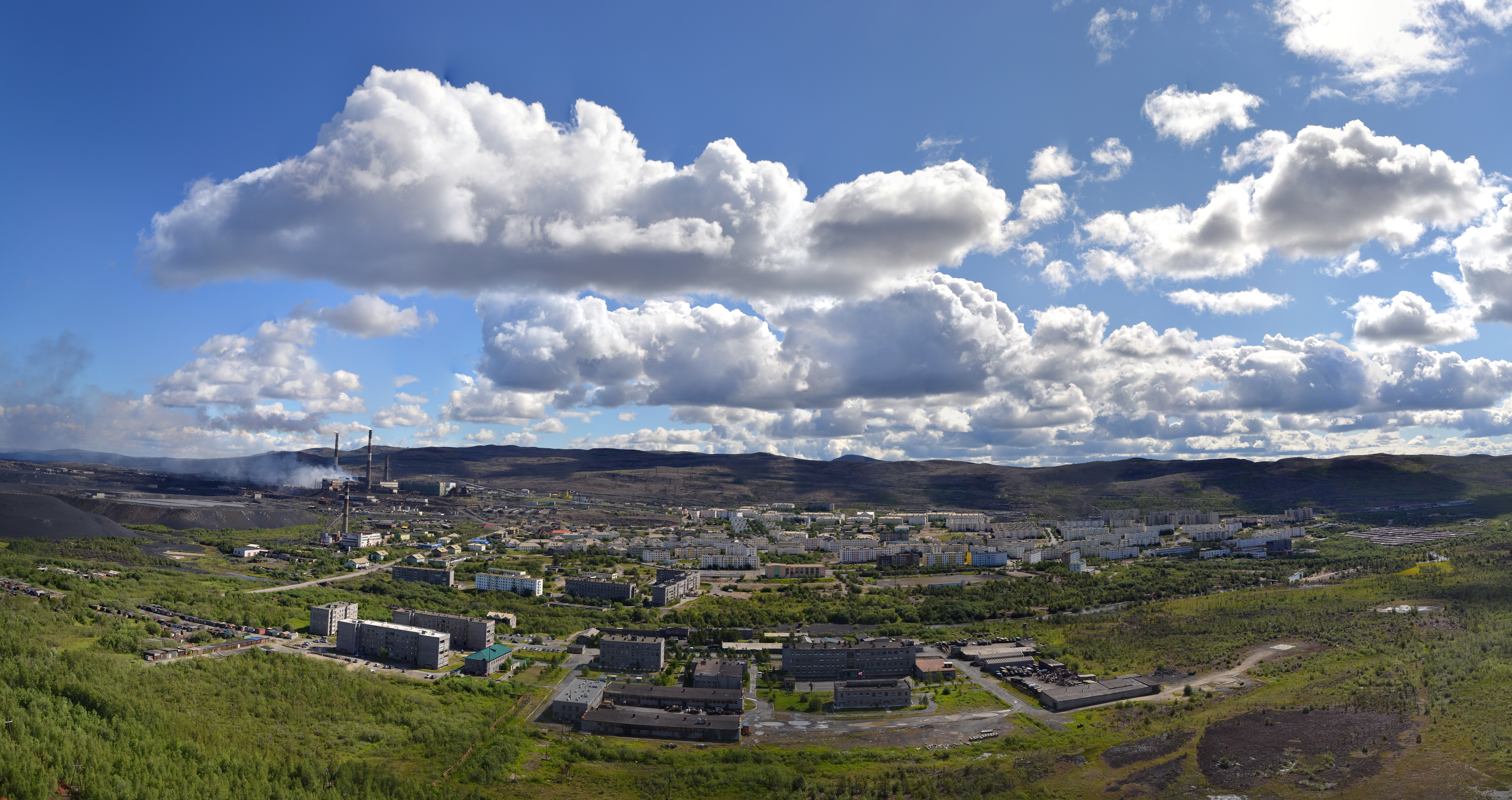
- Mid-July 2011 view of Nikel

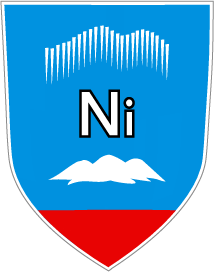
- Coat of arms
- Interactive map of Nikel
- Location of Nikel Nikel (Murmansk Oblast)
- Coordinates: 69°24′50″N 30°13′55″E
- Country: Russia
- Federal subject: Murmansk Oblast
- Administrative district: Pechengsky District
- Founded: 1936
- Elevation: 140 m (460 ft)

Population (2010 Census)
  - Total: 12,756
  - Estimate (2023): 9,519 (−25.4%)

Administrative status
  - Capital of: Pechengsky District

Municipal status
  - Municipal district: Pechengsky Municipal District
  - Urban settlement: Nikel Urban Settlement
  - Capital of: Nikel Urban Settlement
- Time zone: UTC+3 (MSK)
- Postal code: 184421
- Dialing code: +7 81554
- OKTMO ID: 47615151051

Nikel (Russian: Ни́кель, lit. 'nickel'; Skolt Sami: Koolâsjokk, Norwegian: Nikkel, Finnish: Nikkeli, formerly Kolosjoki) is an urban locality (an urban-type settlement) and the administrative center of Pechengsky District of Murmansk Oblast, Russia, located on the shores of Lake Kuetsyarvi 196 kilometers (122 mi) northwest of Murmansk and 7 kilometers (4.3 mi) from the Norwegian border on E105. Population: 12,756 (2010 census); 16,534 (2002 census); 21,838 (1989 Soviet census); 18,000 (1973).

== History ==
In the 1920 Treaty of Tartu, Soviet Russia ceded the area of Petsamo to Finland. In the 1930s huge reserves of nickel were found on fells nearby. The amount was estimated to be five million tons. In 1934, the Finnish government awarded the mining right to the British Mond Nickel Co, subsidiary of International Nickel Co (Inco), that founded the Petsamon Nikkeli Oy mining company. The company began building a railway, as well as other infrastructure, between the town, then known as Kolosjoki, and Liinahamari harbor.

In the Winter War of 1939–1940, the Soviet Union occupied Petsamo. In the following peace agreement only the Finnish part of the Rybachy Peninsula was ceded to the Soviet Union, although the Soviets had occupied all of Petsamo during the war. In summer 1940, the Finnish government took over the mines from the British company. The first mining operations began in the same year. During World War II, the ore was mainly sold to Germany. The hydro power plant in Jäniskoski started operations in 1942, making it possible to smelt the ore locally.

In December 1943 Albert Speer, German Minister of Armaments and War Production, flew on an inspection tour to Kolosjoki, which by then was the sole supplier of nickel to the Third Reich. Captured during the invasion of Russia, the mines’ ore heaps remained in the yards and had not been shipped out due to a priority of bomb-proofing the power station and smelter. By placing the power plant security on a lower priority, Speer was able to make the transportation shipments of the vital ore to Germany move quicker.

In 1944, the Red Army occupied Petsamo, and Finland had to cede it to the Soviet Union as part of the Moscow Armistice signed on September 19, 1944. Retreating German forces destroyed the power plant and partially the smelter. On July 21, 1945, the Presidium of the Supreme Soviet of the Soviet Union decreed to establish Pechengsky District with the administrative center in Nikel on the ceded territory and to include this district as a part of Murmansk Oblast.

== Ecology ==
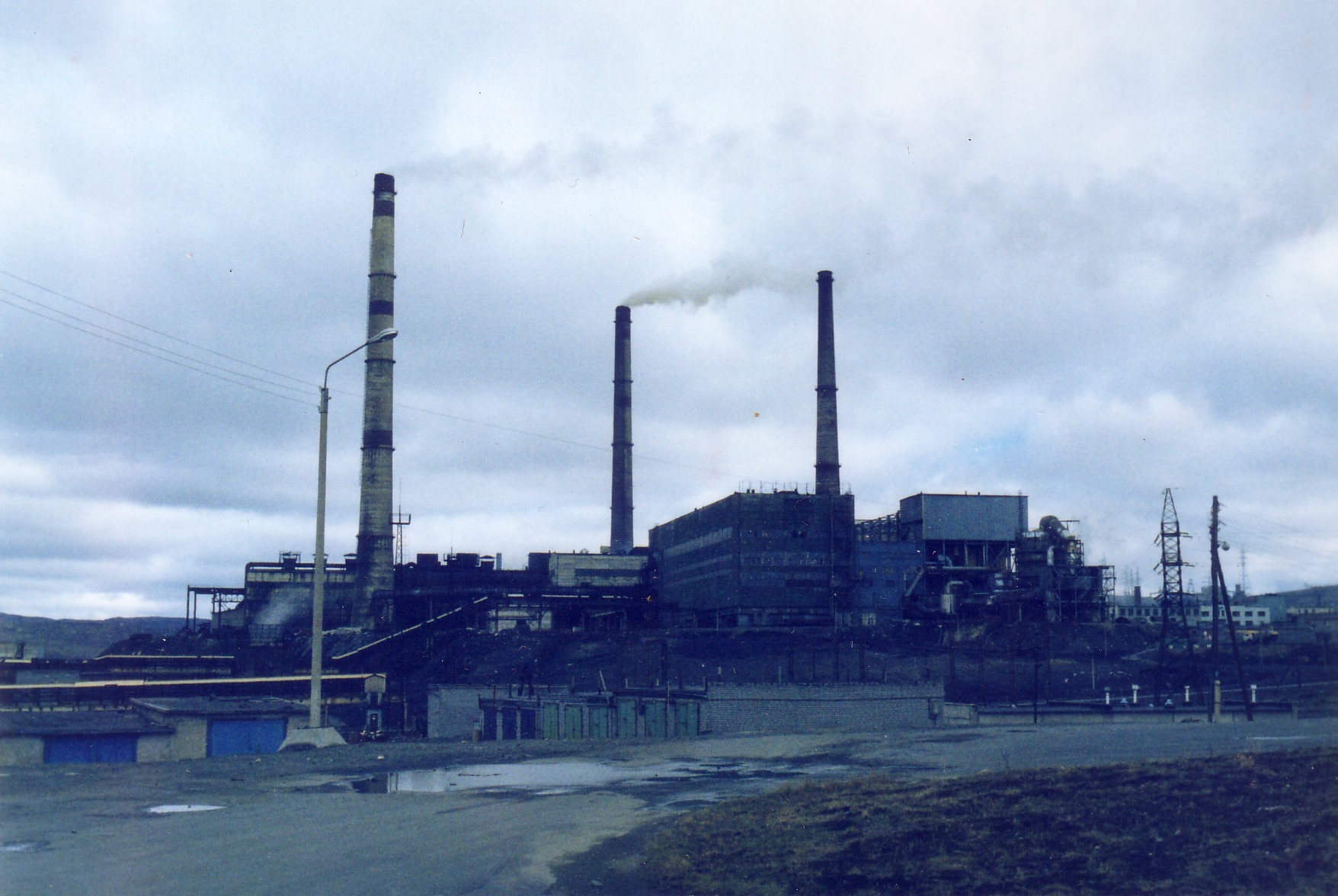
Norilsk Nickel plant in Nikel

The town is linked to the Norilsk Nickel plant Kola MMC nearby where many of its citizens have been employed and which has caused environmental and health concerns for the population. The nickel smelter which has been an eyesore in Norway–Russia relations for decades due to its extreme pollution levels has usually deposited its sulfur dioxide fumes to the south of the town where the countryside is a brown moonscape of bald hills, barren of plant life for kilometers around. In the summertime, the toxic fumes which for the rest of the year rarely blew northwards towards the town occasionally did just that, making breathing difficult and even burning holes in people's umbrellas.

The nickel smelter closed down in 2020. This led to a strong improvement in water and air quality in the region.

== Recent events ==
The video of English alternative rock band White Lies, Farewell to the Fairground, was filmed there in early 2009.

== Sister City ==
- Kirkenes, Norway
