= Nautsi =

Abolished inhabited locality in Murmansk Oblast, Russia

Nautsi Наутси
- Posyolok (abolished)
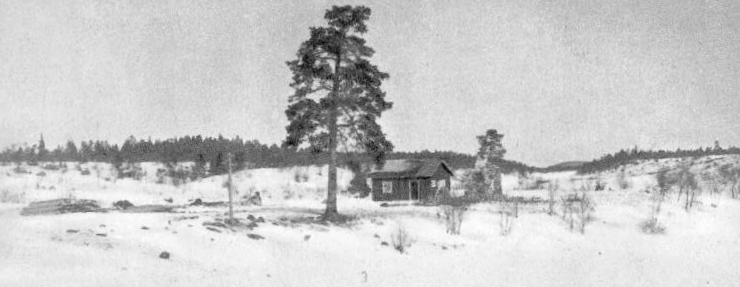
- Nautsi in 1940
- Interactive map of Nautsi
- Location of Nautsi Nautsi (Murmansk Oblast)
- Coordinates: 69°00′01″N 29°03′20″E
- Country: Russia
- Federal subject: Murmansk Oblast
- Administrative district: Pechengsky District
- Abolished: December 13, 1962
- Elevation: 96 m (315 ft)

Nautsi (Russian: Наутси; Skolt Sami: Njäʹhčč) was a rural locality in Pechengsky District of Murmansk Oblast, Russian SFSR, Soviet Union. It lies on the east bank of the Paatsjoki River, which forms part of the border between Norway and Russia.

== History ==
The settlement of Nyakhcha (Няхча) was initially settled by migrants from Chalmozero. In 1904, it had a population of 12.

Prior to World War II, between 1921 and 1944, Nautsi was a Finnish village in Petsamo Province. Finnish forces retreated to this location in 1939 during the Winter War. During World War II, Germany sought to capture this area because of the nearby nickel mines.

Nautsi became a part of the Soviet Union in 1945. It was officially abolished on December 13, 1962.
