= Liinakhamari =

Liinakhamari Лиинахамари
- Posyolok
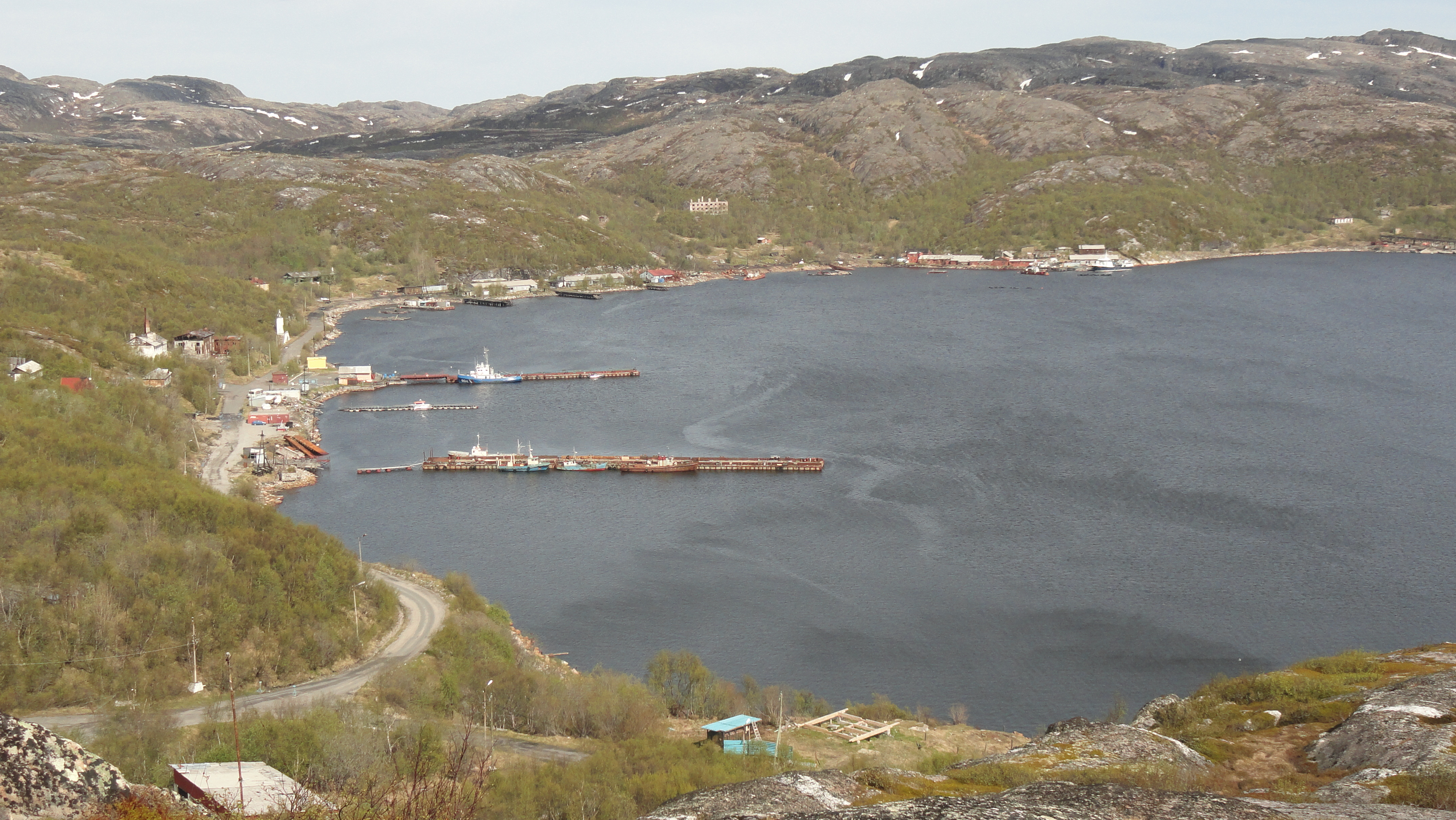

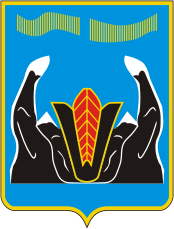
- Coat of arms
- Interactive map of Liinakhamari
- Location of Liinakhamari Liinakhamari (Murmansk Oblast)
- Coordinates: 69°38′00″N 031°15′00″E
- Country: Russia
- Federal subject: Murmansk Oblast
- Administrative district: Pechengsky District
- Elevation: 68 m (223 ft)

Population (2010 Census)
  - Total: 475
  - Estimate (2021): 395 (−16.8%)
- Time zone: UTC+3 (MSK)
- Postal code: 184402
- Dialing code: +7 81554
- OKTMO ID: 47615162111

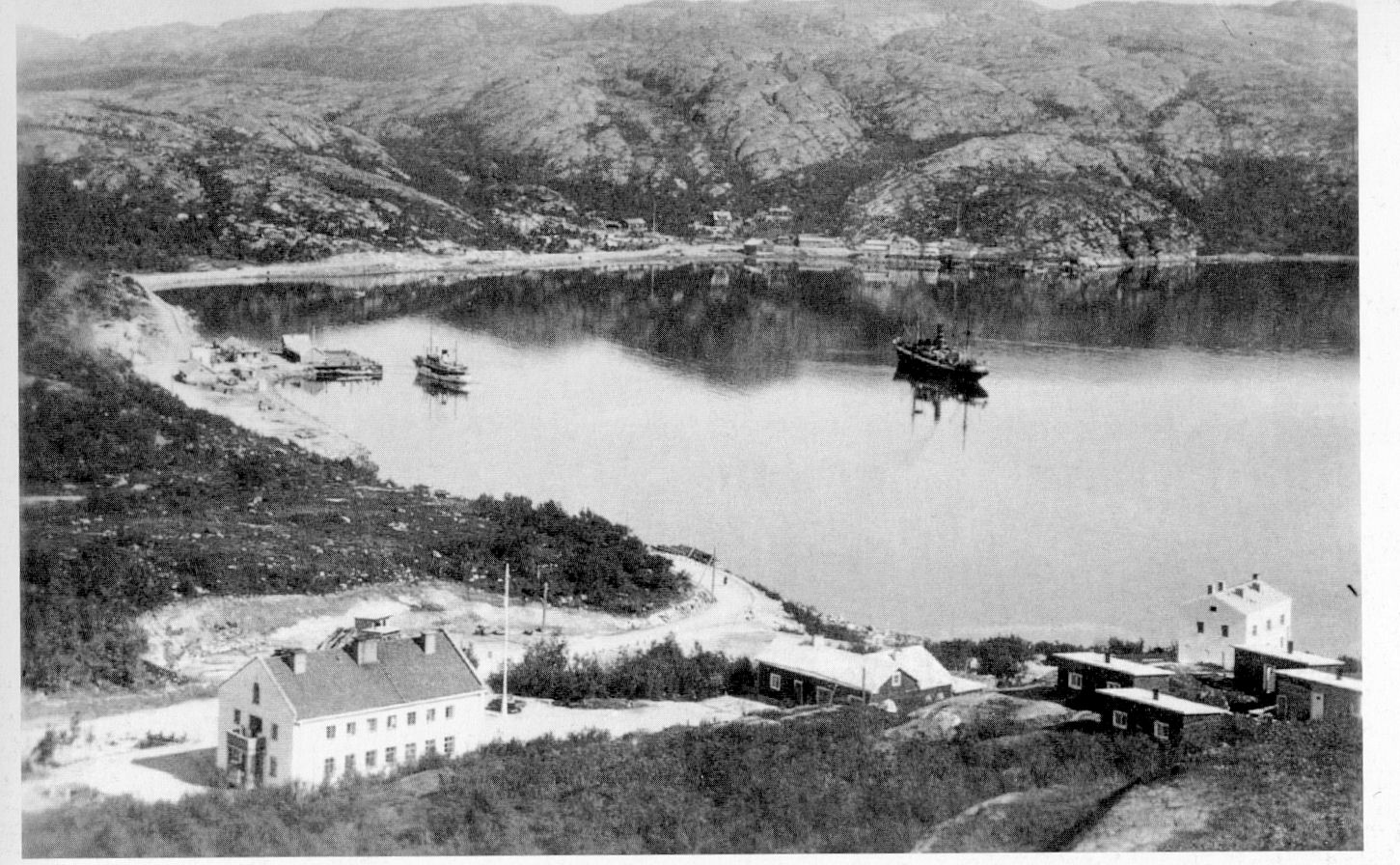
Harbor of Liinahamari in Petsamo, Finland during the 1930s

Liinakhamari (Russian: Лиинахамари; Finnish: Liinahamari; Swedish: Linhammar) is an ice-free harbour and a rural locality in Pechengsky District of Murmansk Oblast, Russia. The harbour belonged to Finland from 1920 until 1944 when it was ceded to the Soviet Union.

Liinakhamari was handed over to Finland after the Treaty of Tartu in 1920. Liinakhamari was Finland's only ocean harbour. The so-called Arctic Ocean Highway from Rovaniemi to Liinakhamari was completed in 1931. The harbour housed a toll, a fish factory, and a hotel and was extended by the end of the 1930s.

During the Russo-Finnish Winter War, the Soviet Union conquered Liinakhamari, but it was returned to Finland in the Moscow Peace Treaty. During 1940–1941, the peace-time period between the Winter War and the Continuation War, Liinakhamari was Finland's and Sweden's only route past the German and Soviet areas of influence. 10,000 men worked along the Arctic Sea Road helping thousands of trucks to transport cargo from the northernmost railway station in Rovaniemi to Liinakhamari harbour. The trip was almost 1,100 kilometres (700 mi) north along the narrow gravelled road, in the middle of sparsely inhabited Arctic taiga.

During the Continuation War 1941–1944 Liinakhamari was governed by German forces. The harbour was attacked by Royal Air Force Fairey Albacore and Fairey Swordfish bomber aircraft on 30 July 1941; Fairey Fulmar fighters were also covering the bombers. (See Raid on Kirkenes and Petsamo.) The United Kingdom announced the declaration of war between the UK and Finland half a year later.

Finnish civilians were evacuated when the Lapland War between Germany and Finland broke out in the autumn of 1944. The harbour was captured from the Germans by Soviet troops on 12 October 1944. Liinakhamari was handed over to the Soviet Union according to agreements of the Moscow Armistice.

Liinakhamari is currently a military harbour. During the Cold War, the harbour was a submarine base, and at present it houses border patrol boats.

== Climate ==
Climate data for Liinakhamari harbour (1991–2020 normals)
Month	Jan	Feb	Mar	Apr	May	Jun	Jul	Aug	Sep	Oct	Nov	Dec	Year
Record high °C (°F)	5.2 (41.4)	4.5 (40.1)	8.7 (47.7)	12.8 (55.0)	25.2 (77.4)	31.7 (89.1)	32.6 (90.7)	28.9 (84.0)	24.0 (75.2)	14.6 (58.3)	6.5 (43.7)	4.1 (39.4)	32.6 (90.7)
Daily mean °C (°F)	−9.5 (14.9)	−8.2 (17.2)	−4.8 (23.4)	−0.3 (31.5)	4.7 (40.5)	9.1 (48.4)	12.7 (54.9)	11.3 (52.3)	7.5 (45.5)	1.3 (34.3)	−3.5 (25.7)	−5.6 (21.9)	1.2 (34.2)
Record low °C (°F)	−26.4 (−15.5)	−26.9 (−16.4)	−23.3 (−9.9)	−15.3 (4.5)	−7.5 (18.5)	1.3 (34.3)	3.8 (38.8)	2.8 (37.0)	−3.0 (26.6)	−17.5 (0.5)	−23.5 (−10.3)	−23.8 (−10.8)	−26.9 (−16.4)
Source: http://www.pogodaiklimat.ru/doc/normals_1991_2020_2.txt http://pogodaiklimat.ru/summary/22002.htm
