= Petsamo Province =

Province of Finland from 1921 to 1922

Petsamo Province Petsamon lääni Petsamo län
- Province of Finland
- 1921–1945
- Coat of arms
- Capital: Petsamo
- Area
- 11,338.68 km^{2} (4,377.89 sq mi)
- History
  - Established: 1921
  - Disestablished: 1945
Preceded by	Succeeded by
Russian SFSR	Province of Oulu

Petsamo Province (Finnish: Petsamon lääni, Swedish: Petsamo län) was a Finnish panhandle. It was a separate province from 1921 to 1922, when it was merged into the Province of Oulu. This panhandle used to give Finland access to the Arctic Ocean, until it was annexed by the Soviet Union in 1944.

== Foundation ==
In 1921, following Finnish independence and military expansion into neighboring Russian territory - which resulted in the annexation of the formerly Russian districts of Pechenga, Repola and Porajärvi by Finland - Soviet Russia was forced to cede the area of Pechenga to Finland in exchange for the return of Repola and Porajärvi according to the Treaty of Tartu. In 1922, it was merged with the province of Oulu.

Petsamo's annexation to Finland was agreed upon in the Treaty of Tartu, but even before the treaty was officially approved, the Finnish government appointed a committee in the fall of 1920 to plan the organization of conditions in the area. The committee's report was completed on October 9, 1920, i.e. before the signing of the peace treaty in Tartu. The committee suggested organizing Petsamo's administration in such a way that it would form its own county, because Oulu was located far away and Petsamo's conditions were poorly known elsewhere in Finland.

The committee also suggested keeping Petsamo occupied, as the foreign policy of Norway and Soviet Russia was perceived as a threat. The occupation was carried out by a section of the border guard, the size of which was not to be very large, so as not to show resentment in Norway, but the size had to be sufficient in case of a Bolshevik attack. President Ståhlberg declared Petsamo a state of emergency on January 21, 1921, because the situation in the area was not well known. In the autumn of 1920, the Parliament had approved a law enabling a state of emergency, which was used to prepare for communist political agitation across the border. The government considered such a law a condition for the ratification of the Tartu Peace Treaty.

In 1938, Lapland was separated from the province of Oulu and the area of Petsamo became part of the new province of Lapland. In the Winter War of 1939–1940 the Soviet Union occupied Petsamo, but returned the area to Finland after the Moscow peace agreement of 1940 (Viipuri was ceded to the Soviet Union). However in 1944, the whole of the former province of Petsamo was ceded to the Soviet Union as part of the preliminary peace agreement between Finland and the victorious Allies of World War II.

== County administration ==
Petsamo's county administration was only organized for the year 1921, so officials were appointed for a fixed period. The administration was led by a governor who, due to the state of emergency, had broader powers than the governors of other counties. For example, letters from other officials to other parts of Finland went through the governor. The governor had the authority to supervise the residents of his county, wider opportunities than usual to carry out searches and arrests, the right to limit people's right to move and stay in the territory of his county, and to issue orders even to border guard troops. On the other hand, he had to organize the distribution of food to the residents.

The governor was Colonel Ilmari Helenius, who was considered by both the state and the people of Petsamo to be a suitable person to hold his office. He was from the border region and, having worked in the service of the Russian Empire, he knew the Russian language. Helenius was also well informed about police operations, as he had worked as a police chief in charge of Helsinki.

One of the first acts of the county government was to take a census and take the oath of allegiance. The inhabitants agreed to take the oath, only one monk of the monastery made an exception. Valan could swear in either Finnish or Russian, as part of the population only knew Russian. In practice, organizing swearing-in ceremonies was difficult as the people of Petsamo live widely scattered in their county. Swearing-in ceremonies were still held in 1922. The majority of residents preferred the Finnish administration to the unstable conditions that preceded it, although the new administration was criticized for cutting ties with Russia and Norway's attitude becoming hostile.

Before the formation of the Finnish administration, there had been a Russian local administration in Petsamo, whose activities were minimal and both legal and administrative matters were almost completely unorganized. The village assembly and the village elder had been the central actors, and senior Russian officials had rarely visited Petsamo. As a result of the Russian revolution, all civil servants and teachers moved out of the area. Although the Bolsheviks had brought in a new civil servant, the Finns did not plan the future administration to be a continuation of the previous one, but wanted to completely reorganize the administration. The task of the governor of Petsamo county was also to organize the municipal administration.

The county administration soon started Finnishing the residents, where Finnish-language schools were the key players. The county's Russian and Karelian families were believed to adopt Finnishness and Finnish-speaking with their help. In the spring of 1921, two schools were founded for this purpose. However, the organization of the teaching was made difficult by the students' limited language skills and the teachers also acting as food distributors. People-conscious presentations were given to the adult population once a week, and efforts were made to increase their adaptability to the new administration by also exempting them from paying taxes. Granting the tax exemption was also influenced by the fact that the people of Petsamos did not have Finnish money at their disposal, and they were poor.

== County government officials ==
The State Council appointed the county governor, county secretary and crown prince. Cavalry colonel Ilmari Helenius was elected as governor, surveying engineer Väinö Ahla as county secretary, and deputy judge Lauri Itkonen as crown prince. Helenius became the governor of Uusimaa county already in the fall of 1921, after which county secretary Ahla and chamberlain Lauri Tuomola handled the administration of the county on behalf of the governor. In Petsamo, the county administration was very lord-oriented and the practical management of all administrative branches was centralized to him.

The other county government officials were hired by the governor. The county hired two public school teachers, a chancellor, an accountant, a midwife, a telegraph operator, a doctor, a forester, a priest and two nurses. In addition to the salary, the state paid them a furnished room, heat, water and travel to and from the workplace. The good salary was not enough to attract personnel to Petsamo, which was located far away and where the conditions differed from the rest of Finland. In addition to their official duties, officials and civil servants also had to perform other duties requested by the governor. The county government also started the municipal administration and took care of the tasks that fall under it. After the abolition of the county, the tasks of the county government were transferred to authorities that already handled these in other parts of Finland.

== Abolition of county government ==
Petsamo county was very small in terms of its area compared to other counties, and already in the spring of 1921 the Ministry of the Interior considered the county administration too expensive and sought to end it. The allocated funds for Petsamo were exceeded and the funds allocated to the county administration were not felt to be of much use. However, the money was also used for the Petsamo company's operations. The state auditors found Petsamo's administration to be fumbling and its planning to be non-existent. The existence of the county administration was also not required by the threat to the region from abroad, nor by the residents' dissatisfaction with the new administration, because they did not have a hostile attitude towards the Finnish authorities. They dared to put the municipal administration in charge of the residents, and to organize it, Petsamo was made a municipality.

The decision to terminate the county was made in the summer of 1921, and from the beginning of 1922 Petsamo was part of Oulu County as a temporary fiefdom. The lord moved out of Petsamo in October 1921, and he was satisfied with organizing the distribution of foodstuffs and starting to make the inhabitants Finnish. The economic situation in the area was still bad and there were other problems, but the residents managed somehow. It was difficult, for example, to mark the new national border in the wilderness. The Finns had to complete the border crossing themselves and completed it in November 1921 before the deadline. The Russians demanded a new border crossing, but at this time of the year it was no longer successful. However, the Finnish government agreed to the change of the marked border line demanded by the Russians, in order to reach an agreement and get both sides' approval for the new border line. Because of this, the course of the border was changed at Kalastajasaarento.

Later in 1947, the USSR separately bought the small adjacent Jäniskoski-Niskakoski territory from Finland; it was home to a hydroelectric power plant which was destroyed during World War II and the Soviets wished to rebuild it in order to provide power for its Pechenga area.

== Maps ==
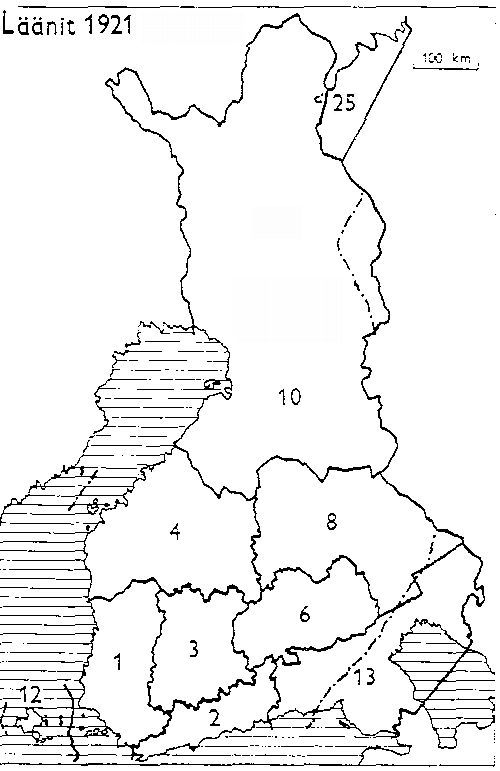
Provinces of Finland 1921: 1: Turku and Pori, 2: Uusimaa, 3: Häme, 4: Vaasa, 6: Mikkeli, 8: Kuopio, 10: Oulu, 12: Åland, 13: Viipuri, 25: Petsamo

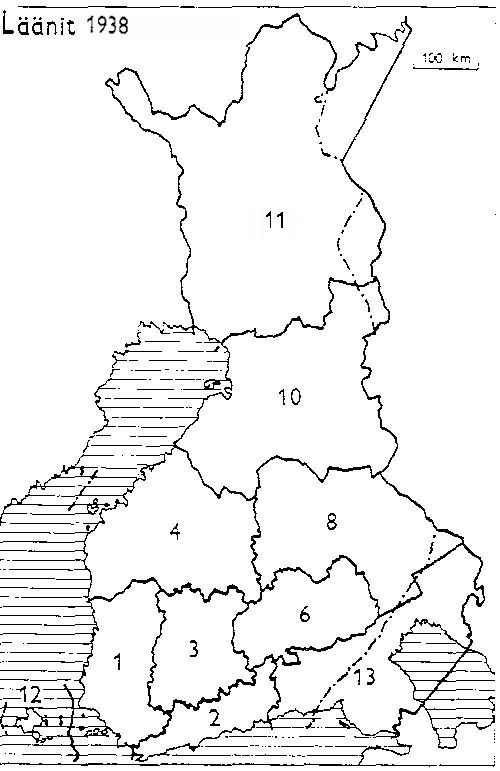
Provinces of Finland 1938: 1: Turku and Pori, 2: Uusimaa, 3: Häme, 4: Vaasa, 6: Mikkeli, 8: Kuopio, 10: Oulu, 11: Lapland, 12: Åland, 13: Viipuri

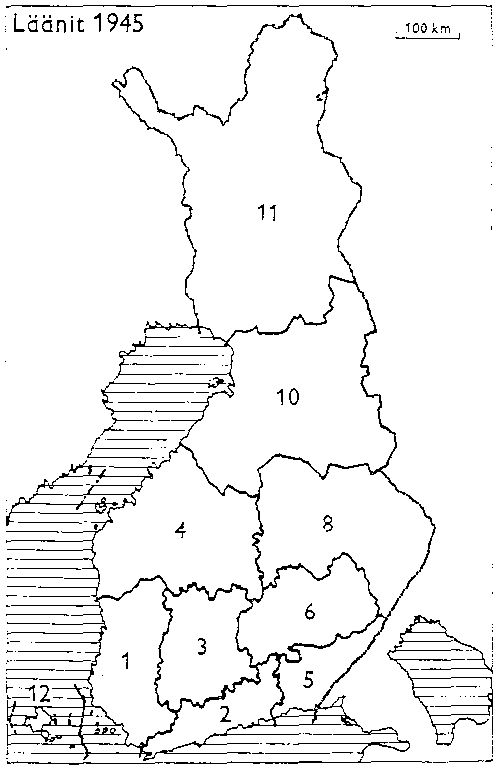
Provinces of Finland 1945: 1: Turku and Pori, 2: Uusimaa, 3: Häme, 4: Vaasa, 5: Kymi, 6: Mikkeli, 8: Kuopio, 10: Oulu, 11: Lapland, 12: Åland

== Municipalities ==
- Petsamo

== Governors ==
- Ilmari Helenius: 1921
