= Pechengsky District =

Pechengsky District Печенгский район (Russian)
- District
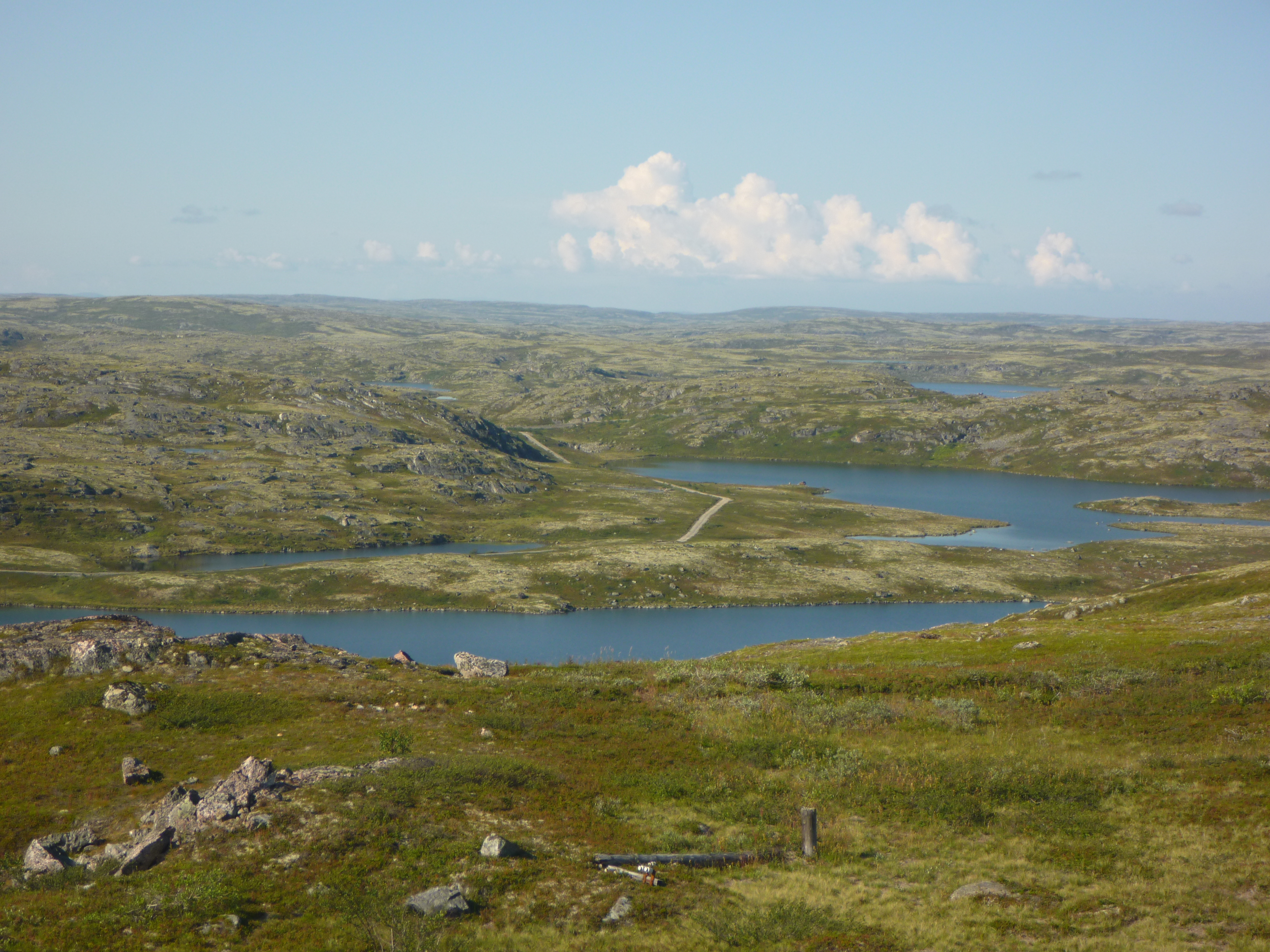
- Landscape in Pechengsky District, August 2013

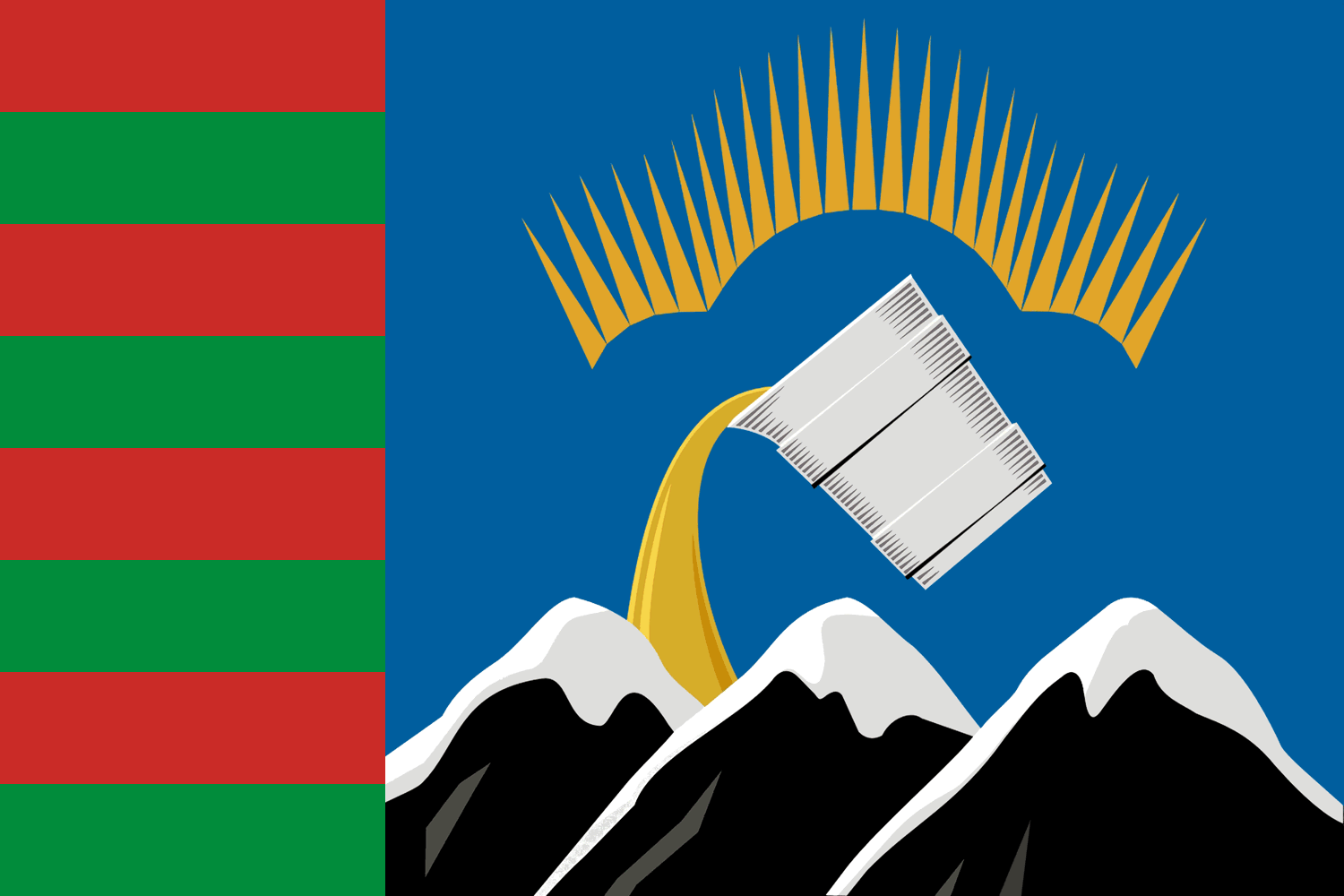
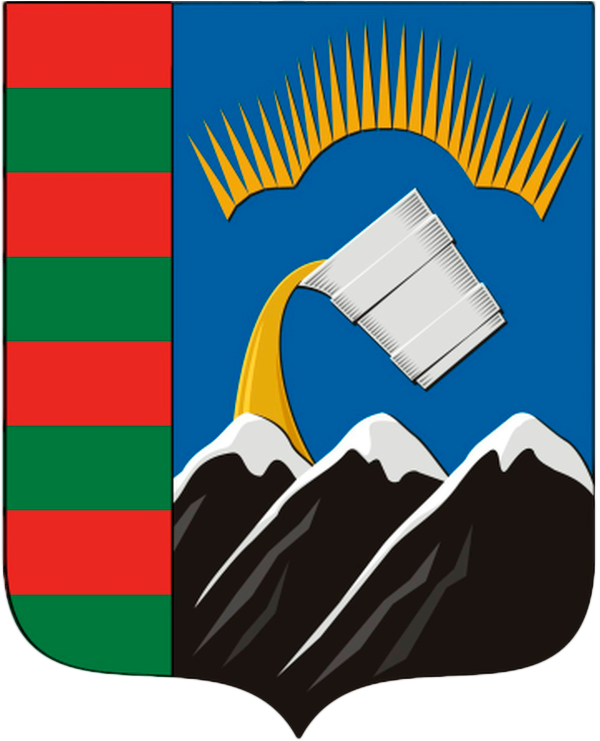
- Flag Coat of arms
- Location of Pechengsky District in Murmansk Oblast
- Coordinates: 69°32′N 31°12′E
- Country: Russia
- Federal subject: Murmansk Oblast
- Established: July 21, 1945
- Administrative center: Nikel

Government
  - Type: Local government
  - Body: Council of Deputies

Area
  - Total: 8,662.22 km^{2} (3,344.50 sq mi)

Population (2010 Census)
  - Total: 38,920
  - Density: 4.493/km^{2} (11.64/sq mi)
  - Urban: 81.6%
  - Rural: 18.4%

Administrative structure
  - Administrative divisions: 1 Towns, 2 Urban-type settlements, 1 Territorial okrugs
  - Inhabited localities: 1 cities/towns, 2 urban-type settlements, 14 rural localities

Municipal structure
  - Municipally incorporated as: Pechengsky Municipal District
  - Municipal divisions: 3 urban settlements, 1 rural settlements
- Time zone: UTC+3 (MSK)
- OKTMO ID: 47615000
- Website: http://pechengamr.ru/

Pechengsky District (Russian: Пе́ченгский райо́н; Finnish: Petsamo; Norwegian: Peisen; Northern Sami: Beahcán; Skolt Sami: Peäccam) is an administrative district (raion), one of the six in Murmansk Oblast, Russia. As a municipal division, it is incorporated as Pechengsky Municipal District. It is located in the northwest of the oblast, on the coast of the Barents Sea (by the Rybachy Peninsula, which is a part of the district) and borders Finland in the south and southwest and Norway in the west, northwest, and north. The area of the district is 8,662.22 square kilometers (3,344.50 sq mi). Its administrative center is the urban locality (an urban-type settlement) of Nikel. Its population was 38,920 (2010 census); 46,404 (2002 census); 59,495 (1989 Soviet census). The population of Nikel accounts for 32.8% of the district's total population.

== History ==
=== Russian settlement ===
The area was long inhabited by the indigenous Sami people, and the border between Norway and Russia was not defined in terms of land. Instead, the Treaty of Novgorod (1326) specified which indigenous nomadic families had to pay their taxes to which government. In 1533, the settlement of the Pechenga Monastery was defined as part of Russia.

The settlement of Pechenga was founded as the Pechenga Monastery in 1533 at the influx of the Pechenga River into the Barents Sea, 135 kilometers (84 mi) west of modern Murmansk, by St. Tryphon, a monk from Novgorod. Inspired by the model of the Solovetsky Monastery, Tryphon wished to convert the local Skolt Sami population to Christianity and demonstrate how faith could flourish in the most inhospitable lands.

The area was resettled by the Pomors and other Russians. The present border between Norway and Russia was settled in 1826, and the development of the area considerably accelerated in the late 19th century, when the monastery was re-established there. The harbor of Liinakhamari in Petsamo was important for the Russian economy during World War I as the Baltic Sea was blocked by the Germans.

=== Finnish control ===
According to the 1920 Treaty of Tartu that followed Finnish occupation of the region, Soviet Russia ceded the area of Pechenga (Petsamo Province) to Finland.

Deposits of nickel were found in 1921, after Petsamo became a part of Finland. In 1934, the deposits were estimated at over five million tonnes. Mining operations were started in 1935 by Canadian and French corporations.

Construction of a road from Sodankylä through Ivalo to Liinakhamari started in 1916 and was completed in 1931. This made Petsamo a popular tourist attraction, as it was the only port by the Barents Sea reachable by automobile.

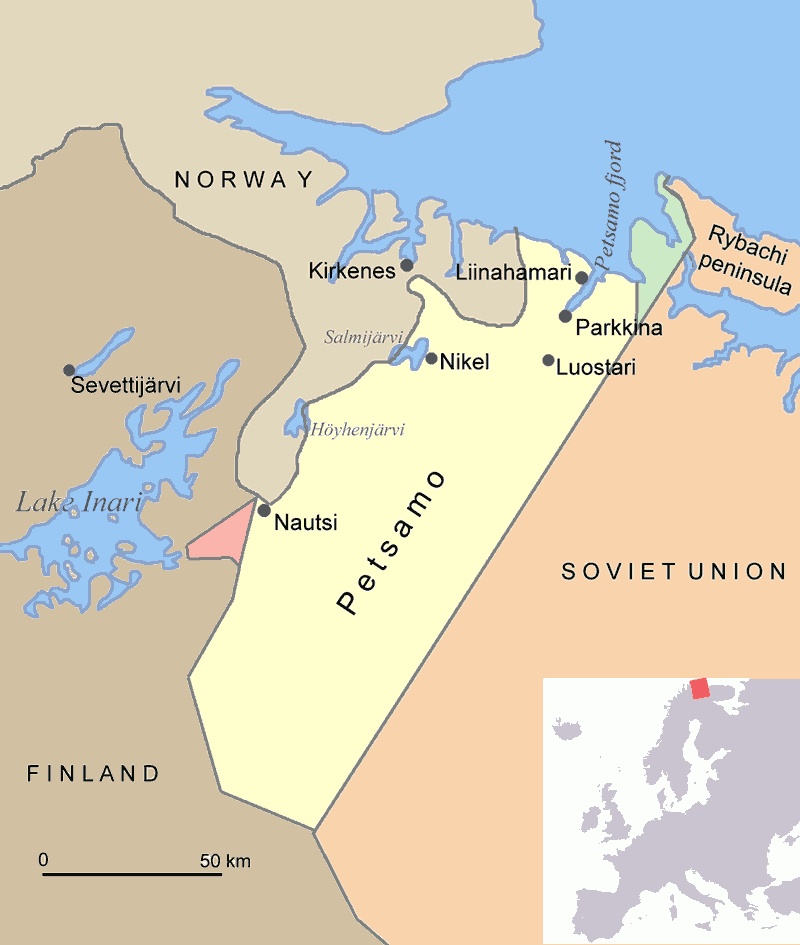
Finnish part of the Rybachy Peninsula, formally ceded to the Soviets after the 1939–40 Winter War. Area ceded to the Soviets in the 1944 Moscow Armistice. Jäniskoski-Niskakoski territory, which Finland sold to the Soviet Union in 1947.

In the Winter War of 1939–1940, the Soviet Union briefly occupied Petsamo. In the following peace agreement, the Rybachy Peninsula, with the area of 321 square kilometers (124 sq mi), was the only part of Petsamo ceded to the Soviet Union, although the Soviets had occupied all of Petsamo during the Winter War.

In 1941, during World War II, Petsamo was used by Nazi Germany as a staging area for the offensive towards Murmansk. In 1944, the Red Army occupied Petsamo again, and this time Finland had to cede it to the Soviet Union as part of the Moscow Armistice signed on September 19, 1944 that halted fighting in the Continuation War. The total ceded area was 8,965 square kilometers (3,461 sq mi). On July 21, 1945, the Presidium of the Supreme Soviet of the Soviet Union decreed the establishment of Pechengsky District with the administrative center in Nikel on the ceded territory and to include this district as a part of Murmansk Oblast.

In 1947, Finland exchanged the remaining 169 square kilometers (65 sq mi) Jäniskoski-Niskakoski territory, including the Jäniskoski hydroelectric plant, for Soviet-confiscated German investments in Finland.

=== Retrocession to Russia ===
Following the Paris Peace Treaty, the local Skolt Sami were given the choice of staying in Soviet Russia or moving to Finland. Most opted to re-settle in Finland, but some chose to stay in Russia.

When Polyarny District was abolished on July 9, 1960, a part of its territory was transferred to Pechengsky District.

On December 26, 1962, when the Presidium of the Supreme Soviet of the RSFSR decreed the reorganisation of the Soviets of People's Deputies and the executive committees of the krais, oblasts, and districts into the industrial and agricultural soviets, Murmansk Oblast was not affected and kept one unified Oblast Soviet and the executive committee. Nevertheless, on February 1, 1963, the Decree by the Presidium of the Supreme Soviet of the RSFSR established the new structure of the districts of Murmansk Oblast, which classified Pechengsky District as rural. However, this classification only lasted for less than two years. The November 21, 1964 Decree by the Presidium of the Supreme Soviet of the RSFSR restored the unified Soviets of People's Deputies and the executive committees of the krais and oblasts where the division into the urban and rural districts was introduced in 1962, and the districts of Murmansk Oblast were re-categorized as regular districts again by the January 12, 1965 Presidium of the Supreme Soviet of the RSFSR Decree.

== Economy ==
The district is important for its ice-free harbor, Liinakhamari, and the deposits of nickel.

== See also ==
- Nemetsky Peninsula
