= Filipinos in Finland =

Ethnic group in Finland

Filippiiniläiset Suomessa / Suomen filippiiniläiset

Total population
- 17,663 Filipino citizens; 19,418 born in the Philippines (2025)

Regions with significant populations
- Helsinki, Tampere and Turku regions

Languages
- Philippine English, Filipino, Finnish

Religion
- Roman Catholicism, Protestantism

Filipinos in Finland or Finnish Filipinos are people who have a background from the Philippines who now live in Finland. People can be born in the Philippines, have Philippine ancestry and/or be citizens of the Philippines. As of 2025, there were 19,418 people born in the Philippines living in Finland. Similarly, the number of people with Philippine citizenship was 17,663. The number of people who spoke Tagalog or Filipino as their mother tongue was 13,380.

== Demographics ==
Historical population
| Year | Pop. | ±% p.a. |
|---|---|---|
| 1990 | 282 | — |
| 1995 | 563 | +14.83% |
| 2000 | 795 | +7.14% |
| 2005 | 1,051 | +5.74% |
| 2010 | 1,891 | +12.47% |
| 2015 | 3,568 | +13.54% |
| 2020 | 6,201 | +11.69% |
| 2025 | 19,418 | +25.65% |
Philippine born. Source: Statistics Finland

People born in the Philippines and living in Finland, according to Statistics Finland.

Country of birth the Philippines by municipality (2025)
| Municipality | Population |
|---|---|
| Whole country | 19,418 |
| Helsinki | 3,764 |
| Espoo | 3,135 |
| Vantaa | 1,866 |
| Tampere | 1,135 |
| Turku | 769 |
| Oulu | 407 |
| Vaasa | 380 |
| Lahti | 311 |
| Kuopio | 222 |
| Kajaani | 221 |
| Rovaniemi | 217 |
| Hämeenlinna | 192 |
| Jyväskylä | 184 |
| Mikkeli | 184 |
| Hyvinkää | 178 |
| Pori | 161 |
| Lohja | 159 |
| Rauma | 158 |
| Joensuu | 155 |
| Seinäjoki | 139 |
| Porvoo | 129 |
| Uusikaupunki | 129 |
| Kirkkonummi | 125 |
| Pieksämäki | 123 |
| Savonlinna | 123 |
| Raisio | 122 |
| Kotka | 117 |
| Kouvola | 117 |
| Kerava | 110 |
| Jakobstad | 103 |
| Kangasala | 99 |
| Mariehamn | 97 |
| Järvenpää | 90 |
| Salo | 89 |
| Vihti | 82 |
| Lappeenranta | 76 |
| Kuusamo | 75 |
| Nurmijärvi | 74 |
| Raseborg | 74 |
| Kokkola | 72 |
| Tuusula | 72 |
| Sipoo | 69 |
| Nokia | 61 |
| Kittilä | 57 |
| Hanko | 56 |
| Inari | 55 |
| Kankaanpää | 55 |
| Mäntyharju | 55 |
| Hollola | 52 |
| Kemijärvi | 49 |
| Sotkamo | 49 |
| Raahe | 48 |
| Riihimäki | 48 |
| Heinola | 47 |
| Kaarina | 46 |
| Tornio | 46 |
| Varkaus | 45 |
| Kauhava | 44 |
| Ylöjärvi | 44 |
| Virrat | 41 |
| Imatra | 38 |
| Kauniainen | 38 |
| Valkeakoski | 38 |
| Forssa | 37 |
| Jämsä | 37 |
| Nykarleby | 36 |
| Mäntsälä | 35 |
| Sastamala | 35 |
| Sodankylä | 35 |
| Kuhmo | 34 |
| Laitila | 34 |
| Siikalatva | 33 |
| Kemi | 31 |
| Eura | 30 |
| Ikaalinen | 30 |
| Hamina | 29 |
| Lempäälä | 29 |
| Loviisa | 29 |
| Korsholm | 29 |
| Pyhäjärvi | 29 |
| Lieto | 28 |
| Iisalmi | 27 |
| Asikkala | 26 |
| Salla | 26 |
| Laihia | 24 |
| Nurmes | 24 |
| Akaa | 23 |
| Ingå | 23 |
| Karkkila | 23 |
| Kristinestad | 23 |
| Eurajoki | 22 |
| Alavus | 21 |
| Kangasniemi | 21 |
| Huittinen | 20 |
| Lieksa | 20 |
| Orivesi | 20 |
| Paimio | 20 |
| Parkano | 20 |
| Urjala | 20 |
| Viitasaari | 20 |
| Lapinlahti | 19 |
| Liperi | 19 |
| Naantali | 19 |
| Orimattila | 19 |
| Pargas | 19 |
| Pirkkala | 19 |
| Juva | 18 |
| Leppävirta | 18 |
| Närpes | 18 |
| Vehmaa | 18 |
| Haapavesi | 17 |
| Ilmajoki | 17 |
| Kitee | 17 |
| Kiuruvesi | 17 |
| Outokumpu | 17 |
| Pälkäne | 17 |
| Sysmä | 17 |
| Iitti | 16 |
| Ristijärvi | 16 |
| Hämeenkyrö | 15 |
| Kolari | 15 |
| Kronoby | 15 |
| Lapua | 15 |
| Harjavalta | 14 |
| Keminmaa | 14 |
| Loimaa | 14 |
| Saarijärvi | 14 |
| Tammela | 14 |
| Hartola | 13 |
| Jomala | 13 |
| Kontiolahti | 13 |
| Kurikka | 13 |
| Polvijärvi | 13 |
| Siilinjärvi | 13 |
| Enontekiö | 12 |
| Ilomantsi | 12 |
| Kärkölä | 12 |
| Masku | 12 |
| Mänttä-Vilppula | 12 |
| Pudasjärvi | 12 |
| Rantasalmi | 12 |
| Ranua | 12 |
| Suonenjoki | 12 |
| Hankasalmi | 11 |
| Kempele | 11 |
| Puumala | 11 |
| Siuntio | 11 |
| Ulvila | 11 |
| Ylivieska | 11 |
| Äänekoski | 11 |
| Hyrynsalmi | 10 |
| Joroinen | 10 |
| Laukaa | 10 |
| Loppi | 10 |
| Muhos | 10 |
| Muurame | 10 |
| Pornainen | 10 |
| Posio | 10 |
| Rautavaara | 10 |
| Suomussalmi | 10 |
| Teuva | 10 |

People with Philippine citizenship living in Finland according to Statistics Finland.

Citizens of the Philippines by municipality (2025)
| Municipality | Population |
|---|---|
| Whole country | 17,663 |
| Helsinki | 3,493 |
| Espoo | 3,047 |
| Vantaa | 1,632 |
| Tampere | 1,055 |
| Turku | 678 |
| Vaasa | 352 |
| Oulu | 336 |
| Lahti | 280 |
| Kajaani | 213 |
| Rovaniemi | 202 |
| Kuopio | 197 |
| Hämeenlinna | 172 |
| Mikkeli | 170 |
| Hyvinkää | 153 |
| Rauma | 149 |
| Joensuu | 146 |
| Jyväskylä | 142 |
| Pori | 140 |
| Lohja | 136 |
| Seinäjoki | 131 |
| Pieksämäki | 129 |
| Uusikaupunki | 117 |
| Savonlinna | 116 |
| Porvoo | 112 |
| Raisio | 109 |
| Kouvola | 100 |
| Jakobstad | 98 |
| Kirkkonummi | 95 |
| Kotka | 95 |
| Kangasala | 88 |
| Kerava | 88 |
| Mariehamn | 78 |
| Salo | 72 |
| Kuusamo | 70 |
| Raseborg | 69 |
| Vihti | 69 |
| Järvenpää | 66 |
| Lappeenranta | 64 |
| Tuusula | 62 |
| Kittilä | 59 |
| Nokia | 59 |
| Hanko | 58 |
| Inari | 58 |
| Sipoo | 58 |
| Kankaanpää | 56 |
| Hollola | 54 |
| Kokkola | 54 |
| Mäntyharju | 54 |
| Kemijärvi | 52 |
| Nurmijärvi | 51 |
| Sotkamo | 49 |
| Raahe | 47 |
| Heinola | 46 |
| Riihimäki | 45 |
| Kauhava | 43 |
| Nykarleby | 42 |
| Virrat | 41 |
| Ylöjärvi | 41 |
| Tornio | 40 |
| Kauniainen | 39 |
| Varkaus | 39 |
| Sodankylä | 38 |
| Valkeakoski | 36 |
| Imatra | 35 |
| Jämsä | 34 |
| Kuhmo | 34 |
| Laitila | 33 |
| Siikalatva | 33 |
| Sastamala | 31 |
| Eura | 30 |
| Forssa | 30 |
| Ikaalinen | 29 |
| Kaarina | 29 |
| Mäntsälä | 29 |
| Pyhäjärvi | 29 |
| Kemi | 28 |
| Loviisa | 27 |
| Hamina | 25 |
| Salla | 25 |
| Iisalmi | 24 |
| Asikkala | 23 |
| Nurmes | 23 |
| Eurajoki | 22 |
| Kangasniemi | 22 |
| Karkkila | 22 |
| Lempäälä | 22 |
| Laihia | 21 |
| Urjala | 21 |
| Akaa | 20 |
| Viitasaari | 20 |
| Orivesi | 19 |
| Sysmä | 19 |
| Huittinen | 18 |
| Kristinestad | 18 |
| Lieksa | 18 |
| Paimio | 18 |
| Parkano | 18 |
| Vehmaa | 18 |
| Ingå | 17 |
| Kitee | 17 |
| Lapinlahti | 17 |
| Liperi | 17 |
| Orimattila | 17 |
| Haapavesi | 16 |
| Iitti | 16 |
| Juva | 16 |
| Kolari | 16 |
| Leppävirta | 16 |
| Pälkäne | 16 |
| Ristijärvi | 16 |
| Alavus | 15 |
| Korsholm | 15 |
| Keminmaa | 14 |
| Kiuruvesi | 14 |
| Outokumpu | 14 |
| Pargas | 14 |
| Ilmajoki | 13 |
| Kurikka | 13 |
| Lieto | 13 |
| Pirkkala | 13 |
| Pudasjärvi | 13 |
| Ranua | 13 |
| Enontekiö | 12 |
| Hämeenkyrö | 12 |
| Ilomantsi | 12 |
| Kontiolahti | 12 |
| Kronoby | 12 |
| Loimaa | 12 |
| Puumala | 12 |
| Rantasalmi | 12 |
| Saarijärvi | 12 |
| Tammela | 12 |
| Harjavalta | 11 |
| Kärkölä | 11 |
| Lapua | 11 |
| Mänttä-Vilppula | 11 |
| Närpes | 11 |
| Polvijärvi | 11 |
| Rautavaara | 11 |
| Siilinjärvi | 11 |
| Hankasalmi | 10 |
| Hirvensalmi | 10 |
| Humppila | 10 |
| Hyrynsalmi | 10 |
| Joroinen | 10 |
| Loppi | 10 |
| Naantali | 10 |
| Suomussalmi | 10 |
| Teuva | 10 |
| Toivakka | 10 |
| Ulvila | 10 |

== Notable people ==
- Lauri Laitinen, chairman of the Finns Party Youth
- Lizzie Armanto, American-Finnish professional skateboarder
- Oskari Kekkonen, professional footballer
- Tarmo Peltokoski, conductor, pianist, and composer

== See also ==
- Filipino diaspora
- Immigration to Finland
