= Rauhajärvi =

Lake in Finland

- Location within Finland
- Coordinates: 61.905°N 26.989°E
- Primary inflows: Rauhasalmi
- Primary outflows: Läsäkoski
- Catchment area: Kymijoki
- Basin countries: Finland
- Surface area: 11.27 km^{2} (4.35 sq mi)
- Shore length^{1}: 66.87 km (41.55 mi)
- Surface elevation: 100.1 m (328 ft)
- Frozen: December–May
- Islands: Noukansaari
- Settlements: Mikkeli
- ^{1} Shore length is not a well-defined measure.

Rauhajärvi a medium-sized lake in the Kymijoki main catchment area. It is located in the region Southern Savonia in Finland. It is situated between two big lakes, Kyyvesi and Puula, and it is a part of Kyyvesi–Puula canoeing route.

== See also ==
- List of lakes in Finland
