= Suontee =

- Location within Finland
- Location: Joutsa, Hirvensalmi and Pertunmaa
- Coordinates: 61°39.21′N 026°29.66′E
- Type: Lake
- Catchment area: Kymijoki
- Basin countries: Finland
- Max. length: 38 km (24 mi)
- Surface area: 149 km^{2} (58 sq mi)
- Average depth: 8.8 m (29 ft)
- Max. depth: 43.65 m (143.2 ft)
- Water volume: 0.7 km^{3} (0.17 cu mi)
- Shore length^{1}: 627.254 km (389.758 mi)
- Surface elevation: 94 m (308 ft)
- Frozen: December–April
- Islands: Joussaari, Isosaari, Mankinsaari, Kuivassaari
- ^{1} Shore length is not a well-defined measure.

Suontee (also: Suonteejärvi) is a large lake in the main watershed of the Kymijoki in Finland. The northern part of the lake is located in the region of Central Finland, while the southern part is located in South Savo. The southern part remains in a more untouched state and is included in the Natura 2000 conservation network of the EU. The protection area is 2,625 hectares. Typical birds found in the area include the black-throated loon. Though now separate, Suontee and Puula were one lake until 1854, when the water level was lowered 2.5 meters. This resulted in the emergence of geological stacks, resulting from water erosion.

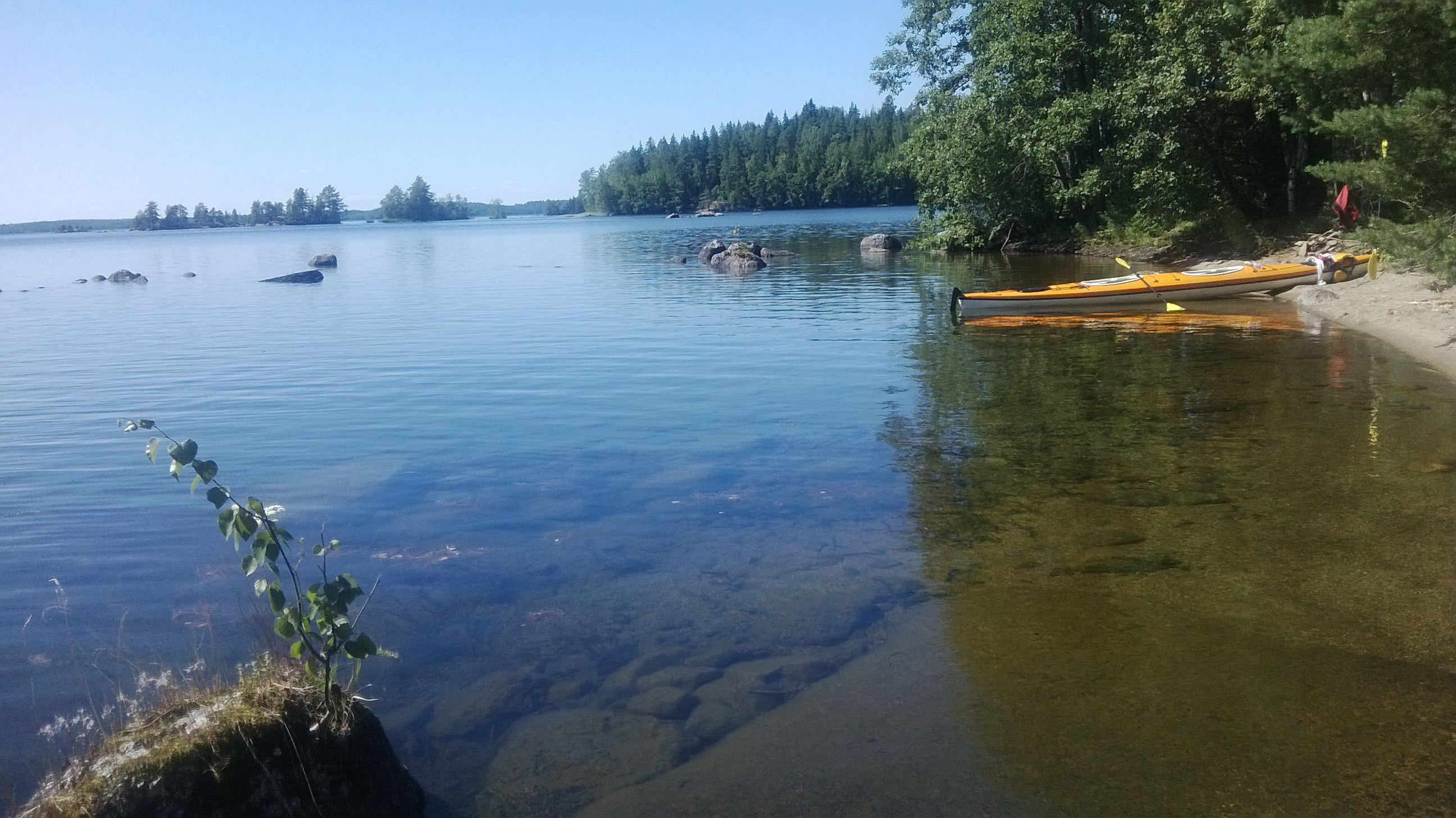
Kayaking in Suontee

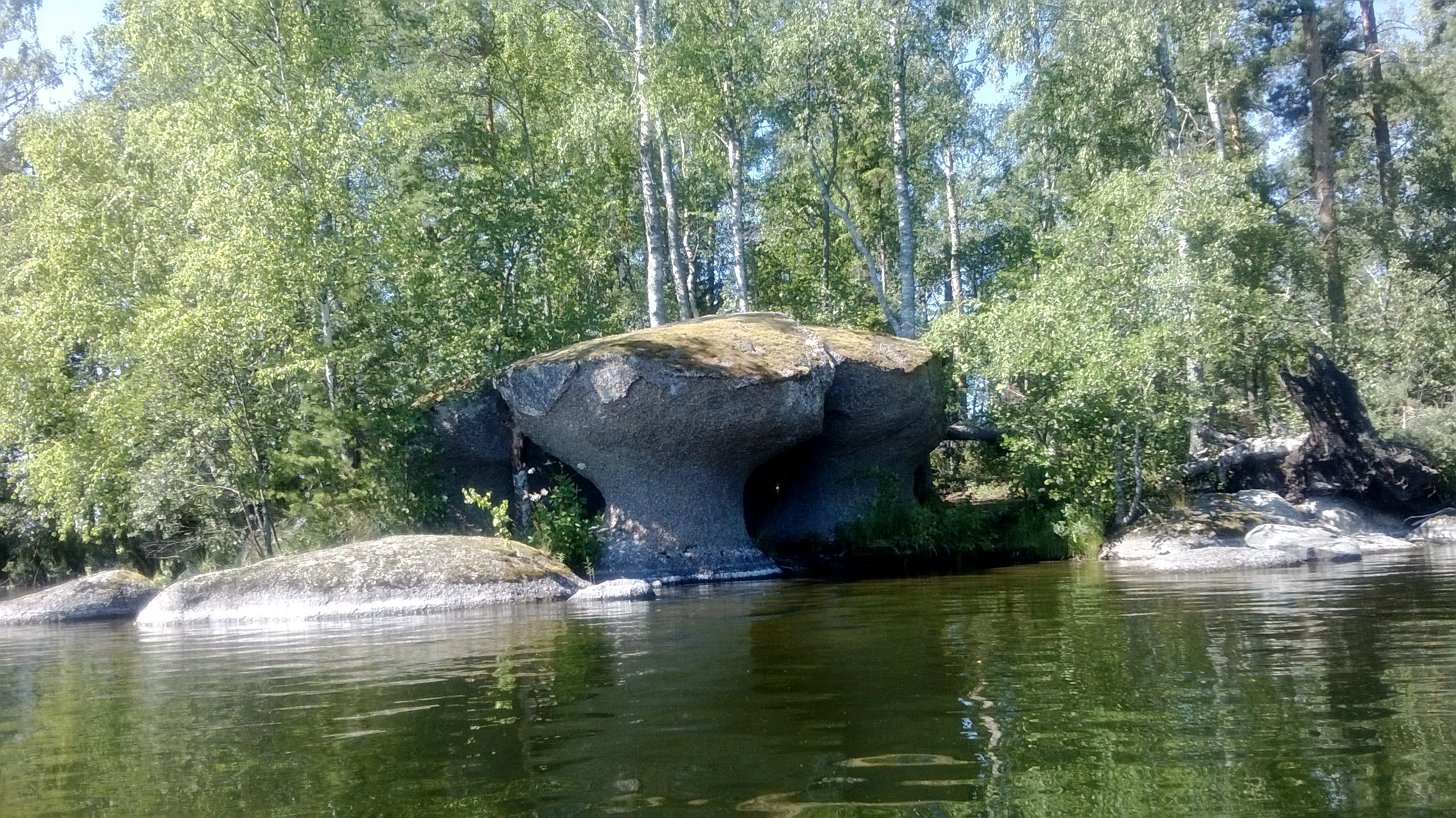
Geological stacks

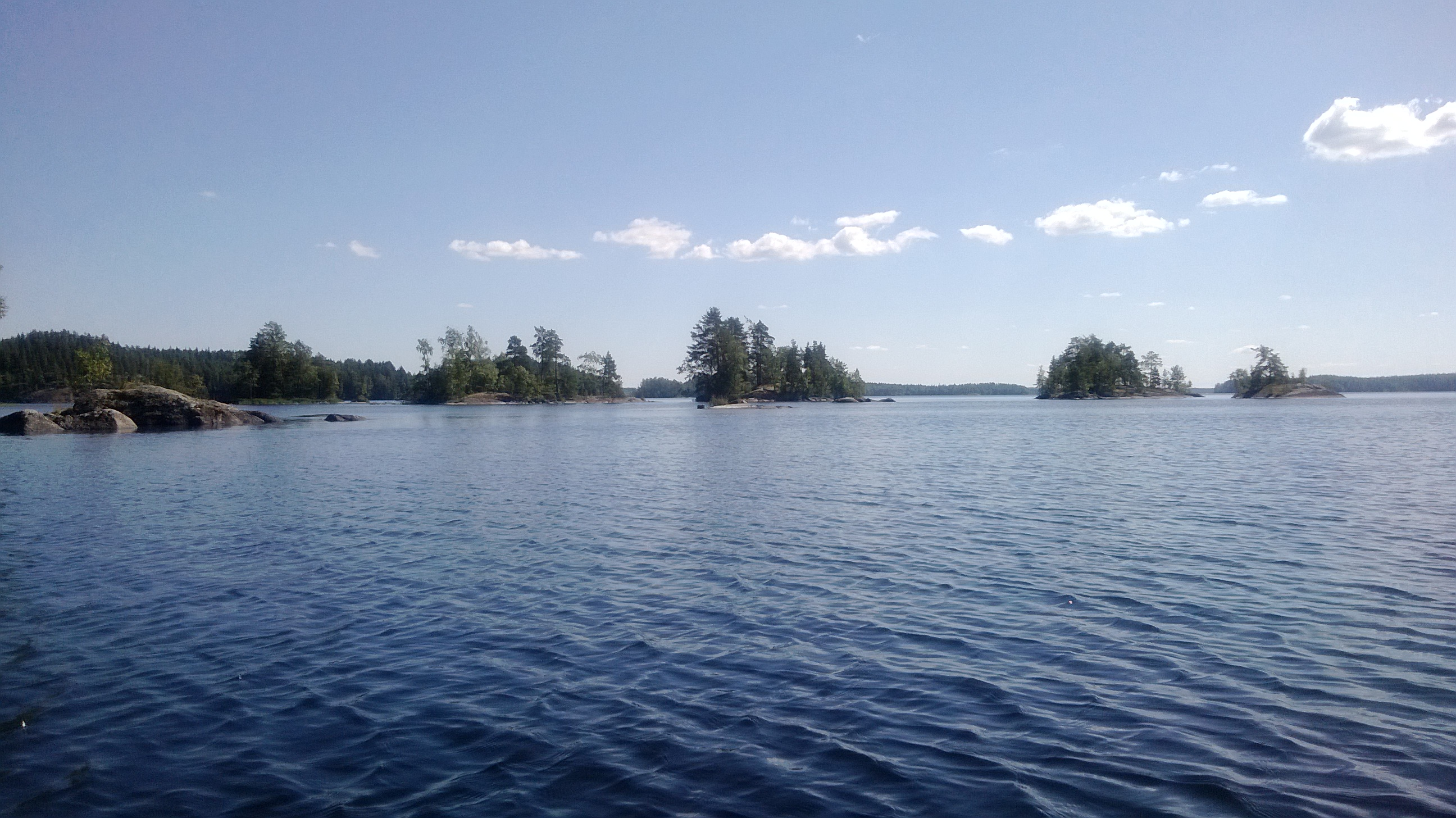
Small islands

== See also ==
- List of lakes in Finland
