= Joutsa =

- Municipality
- Joutsan kunta Joutsa kommun
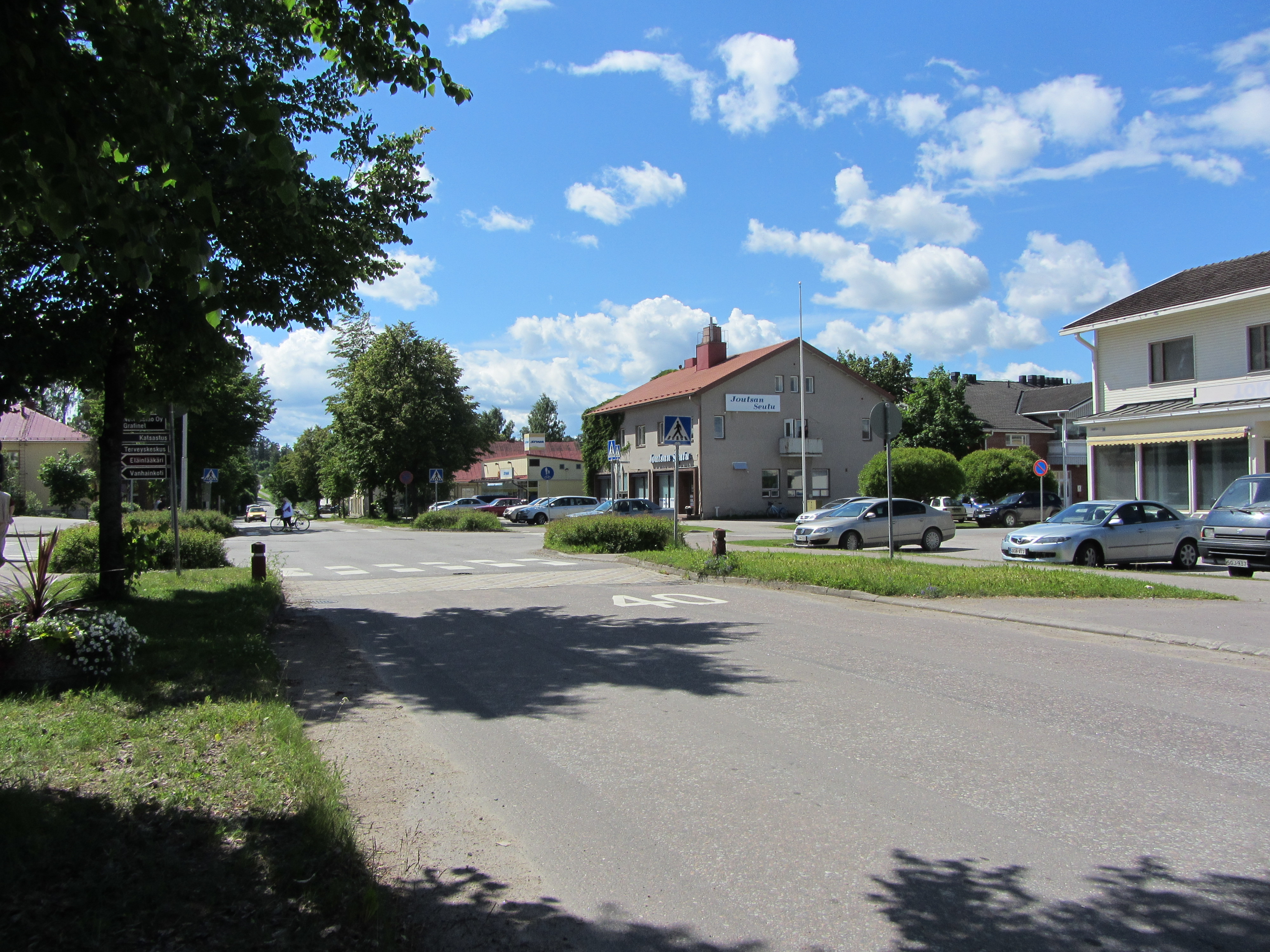
- Joutsa center

- Coat of arms

- Location of Joutsa in Finland
- Interactive map of Joutsa
- Coordinates: 61°44.5′N 026°07′E
- Country: Finland
- Region: Central Finland
- Sub-region: Joutsa

Government
  - Municipal manager: Harri Nissinen

Area (2018-01-01)
  - Total: 1,066.42 km^{2} (411.75 sq mi)
  - Land: 867.07 km^{2} (334.78 sq mi)
  - Water: 199.25 km^{2} (76.93 sq mi)
  - Rank: 89th largest in Finland

Population (2025-12-31)
  - Total: 4,079
  - Rank: 188th largest in Finland
  - Density: 4.7/km^{2} (12/sq mi)

Population by native language
  - Finnish: 93.3% (official)
  - Swedish: 0.2%
  - Others: 6.5%

Population by age
  - 0 to 14: 10.5%
  - 15 to 64: 50.3%
  - 65 or older: 39.2%
- Time zone: UTC+02:00 (EET)
  - Summer (DST): UTC+03:00 (EEST)
- Website: www.joutsa.fi

Joutsa is a municipality of Finland. It is located in the province of Western Finland and is part of the Central Finland region. Jyväskylä is located about 70 kilometres (43 mi) north of the Joutsa municipality.

The municipality has a population of 4,079 (31 December 2025) and covers an area of 1,066.42 square kilometres (411.75 sq mi) of which 199.25 km^{2} (76.93 sq mi) is water. The population density is 4.7 inhabitants per square kilometre (12/sq mi).

The municipality is unilingually Finnish. The municipality of Leivonmäki was consolidated with Joutsa on 1 January 2008.

Sahti culture in Joutsa is known by Joutsan sahti.

The 1985 International Mathematical Olympiad (IMO) took place in the municipality of Joutsa. The competition itself happened on 4 and 5 July, with 38 countries participating. The jury for the 1985 IMO had met on 29 June to decide on the final list of problems in the nearby town of Heinola.

== Geography ==
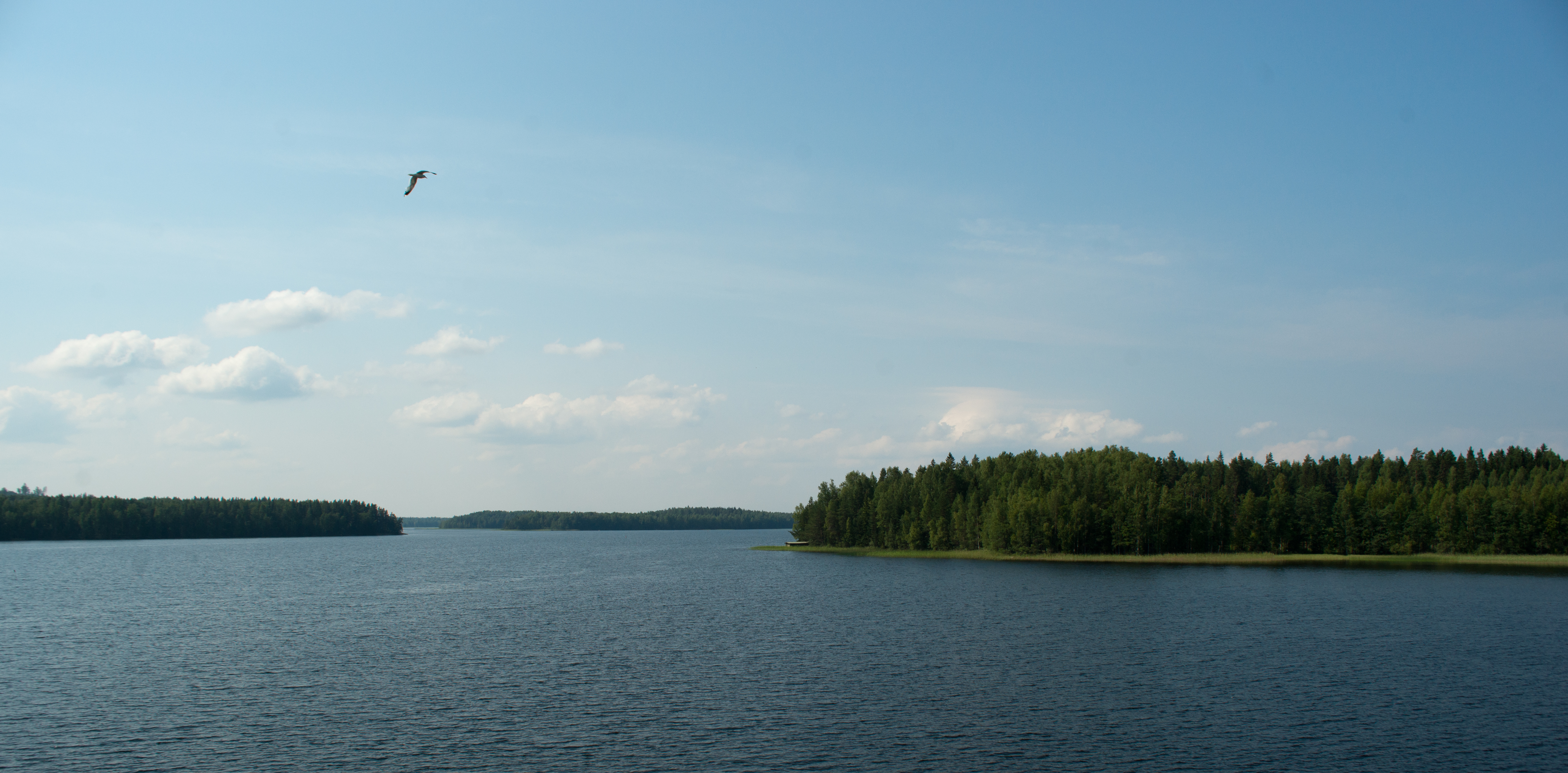
Lake Suontee in Joutsa

Neighbouring municipalities: Hartola, Hirvensalmi, Jyväskylä, Kangasniemi, Luhanka, Pertunmaa and Toivakka.

There are all together 192 lakes in Joutsa. The biggest lakes are Puula, Suontee and Jääsjärvi.

Leivonmäki National Park is located in Joutsa. At area is swamps, beaches and forest in esker.

=== Climate ===
Climate data for Joutsa Savenaho (1991-2020 normals, extremes 1959–present)
Month	Jan	Feb	Mar	Apr	May	Jun	Jul	Aug	Sep	Oct	Nov	Dec	Year
Record high °C (°F)	7.6 (45.7)	9.0 (48.2)	14.9 (58.8)	23.2 (73.8)	29.6 (85.3)	32.4 (90.3)	33.0 (91.4)	32.3 (90.1)	26.0 (78.8)	18.5 (65.3)	11.6 (52.9)	10.1 (50.2)	33.0 (91.4)
Mean daily maximum °C (°F)	−4.4 (24.1)	−3.8 (25.2)	1.1 (34.0)	7.7 (45.9)	15.3 (59.5)	19.5 (67.1)	22.0 (71.6)	19.9 (67.8)	14.0 (57.2)	6.5 (43.7)	1.2 (34.2)	−2.2 (28.0)	8.1 (46.6)
Daily mean °C (°F)	−7.1 (19.2)	−7.2 (19.0)	−3.1 (26.4)	2.6 (36.7)	9.3 (48.7)	13.9 (57.0)	16.4 (61.5)	14.6 (58.3)	9.6 (49.3)	3.8 (38.8)	−0.7 (30.7)	−4.3 (24.3)	4.0 (39.2)
Mean daily minimum °C (°F)	−10 (14)	−10.4 (13.3)	−7 (19)	−1.8 (28.8)	3.6 (38.5)	8.6 (47.5)	11.7 (53.1)	10.4 (50.7)	6.1 (43.0)	1.3 (34.3)	−2.8 (27.0)	−6.8 (19.8)	0.2 (32.4)
Record low °C (°F)	−39.5 (−39.1)	−37.0 (−34.6)	−31.3 (−24.3)	−21.9 (−7.4)	−7.7 (18.1)	−2.9 (26.8)	1.2 (34.2)	−1.8 (28.8)	−6.0 (21.2)	−15.9 (3.4)	−24.5 (−12.1)	−34.1 (−29.4)	−39.5 (−39.1)
Average precipitation mm (inches)	52 (2.0)	41 (1.6)	37 (1.5)	37 (1.5)	45 (1.8)	70 (2.8)	84 (3.3)	71 (2.8)	60 (2.4)	72 (2.8)	62 (2.4)	61 (2.4)	690 (27.2)
Average precipitation days (≥ 0.1 mm)	20	17	15	12	13	15	15	15	16	19	21	20	198
Source 1: FMI normals for Finland 1991-2020
Source 2: record highs and lows

=== Villages ===
- Havumäki
- Kivisuo
- Kälä
- Laitjärvi
- Lapinkylä
- Leivonmäki
- Marjotaipale
- Pärnämäki
- Ruokoranta
- Ruorasmäki
- Rutalahti
- Savenaho
- Selänpohja
- Taka-Ikola
- Tammilahti
- Tolvasniemi
- Vehmaa

== Media ==
Newspapers:

- Joutsan seutu is published in Joutsa and Luhanka.
- Itä-Häme

== Twinnings ==
- Tähtvere Parish, Estonia
- Finspång, Sweden
