= Johan Elfvengren =

Finnish ice hockey player

- Born: 10 June 1994 (age 31) Hartola, Finland
- Height: 5 ft 10 in (178 cm)
- Weight: 172 lb (78 kg; 12 st 4 lb)
- Position: Forward
- Shoots: Right
- Liiga team: Lahti Pelicans
- NHL draft: Undrafted
- Playing career: 2015–present

Johan Elfvengren (born 10 June 1994) is a Finnish ice hockey player. He is currently playing with Lahti Pelicans in the Finnish Liiga.

Elfvengren made his Liiga debut playing with Lahti Pelicans during the 2014–15 Liiga season.
