= Maila Talvio =

Finnish writer

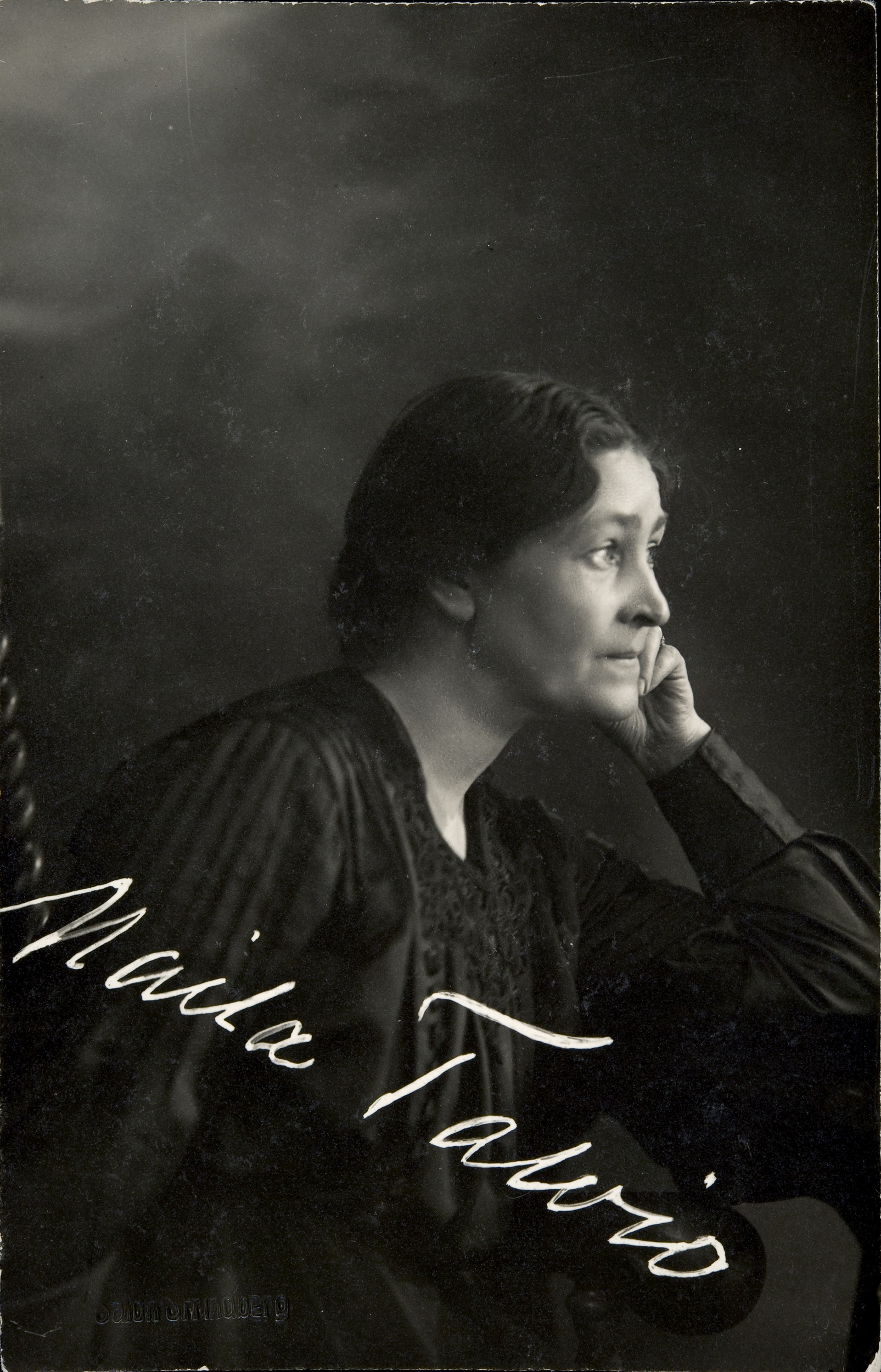
- Born: Maila Winter; October 17, 1871; Hartola
- Died: January 6, 1951 (aged 79); Helsinki
- Occupation: Writer
- Partner: J. J. Mikkola
- Writing career
- Language: Finnish
- Genres: Novel, collection of short stories, drama, collection of speeches and biography

Maila Talvio née Winter, married Mikkola (October 17, 1871 – January 6, 1951), was a Finnish writer. Talvio was a leading Finnish writer on the temperance question and several of her works were translated into Swedish and other languages. She was nominated for the Nobel Prize in Literature three times.

== Life ==
She was born in Hartola, the daughter of Adolf Magnus Winter and Julia Malvina Bonsdorf, who had a family of 9 children. Talvio's father died when she was 9 years old.

Her husband was J. J. Mikkola, a renowned scholar of Slavic linguistics, whom she married in 1893. She died in Helsinki, where she is buried in Hietaniemi Cemetery.

== Books ==
- Haapaniemen keinu, 1895
- Nähtyä ja tunnettua, 1896
- Aili, novel. 1897
- Kaksi rakkautta, novel. 1898
- Suomesta pois, 1899
- Johan Ludvig Runebeg, 1900
- Kansan seassa, novel. 1900
- Pimeän pirtin hävitys, novel. 1901
- Rumaa ja kaunista, 1901
- Peter Wieselgren, 1902
- Juha Joutsia, novel. 1903
- Muuan äiti, 1904
- Savipäiviltä, 1904
- Kauppaneuvoksen kuoltua, 1905
- Louhilinna, novel. 1906
- Eri teitä, 1908
- Puheita, 1908
- Anna sarkoila, 1910
- Tähtien alla, novel. 1910
- Kirjava keto, 1911
- Elinan häät, 1912
- Hämähäkki ja muita kertomuksia, 1912
- Kun meidän kaivosta vesi loppui, 1913
- Talonhuijari, 1913
- Yölintu, novel. 1913
- Huhtikuun-manta, 1914
- Elämänleikki ynnä muita puheita maalaisille, 1915
- Lempiäniemen tyttäret, 1915
- Niniven lapset, novel. 1915
- Elämän kasvot, novel. 1916
- Kultainen lyyra, 1916
- Kootut teokset 1–8, 1917–26
- Silmä yössä, novel. 1917
- Näkymätön kirjanpitäjä, collection of short stories. 1918
- Kurjet, novel. 1919
- Yötä ja aamua, 1919
- Valkea huvila, 1920
- Kihlasormus, novel. 1921
- Kirkonkellot, novel. 1922
- Viimeinen laiva, 1922
- Opin sauna, novel. 1923
- Sydämet, collection of short stories. 1924
- Hiljentykäämme, 1929
- Itämeren tytär, 1929–36 : Kaukaa tullut (1929); Hed-ulla ja hänen kosijansa (1931); Hopealaiva (1936)
- Ne 45 000, 1932
- Leipäkulta, 1934
- Millaista parantolassa on, 1935
- Terveisiä, 1936
- Itämeren tytär, 1940 (trilogy)
- Linnoituksen iloiset rouvat, 1941
- Rukkaset ja kukkaset, 1947
- Lokakuun morsian, 1948
- Juhlavalkeat, 1948
- Rukkaset ja kukkaset, 1947
- Kootut teokset i-xiii, 1951
- Valitut teokset, 1953
- Linnoituksen iloiset rouvat, 1982

== Awards ==
- Valtion kirjallisuuspalkinto (1936)
- Aleksis Kiven kirjallisuuspalkinto (1940)
