= Kivisuo =

- Village
- Location within Finland
- Coordinates: 61.9046°N 25.9727°E
- Country: Finland
- Municipality: Joutsa
- Elevation: 130 m (430 ft)

Population
  - Total: 60

Kivisuo is a village in the municipality of Joutsa in Central Finland.

It is located about 10 kilometers west from Leivonmäki. The village has a population of about 60 inhabitants.
