= Kangasniemi Church =

Church in Kangasniemi, Finland

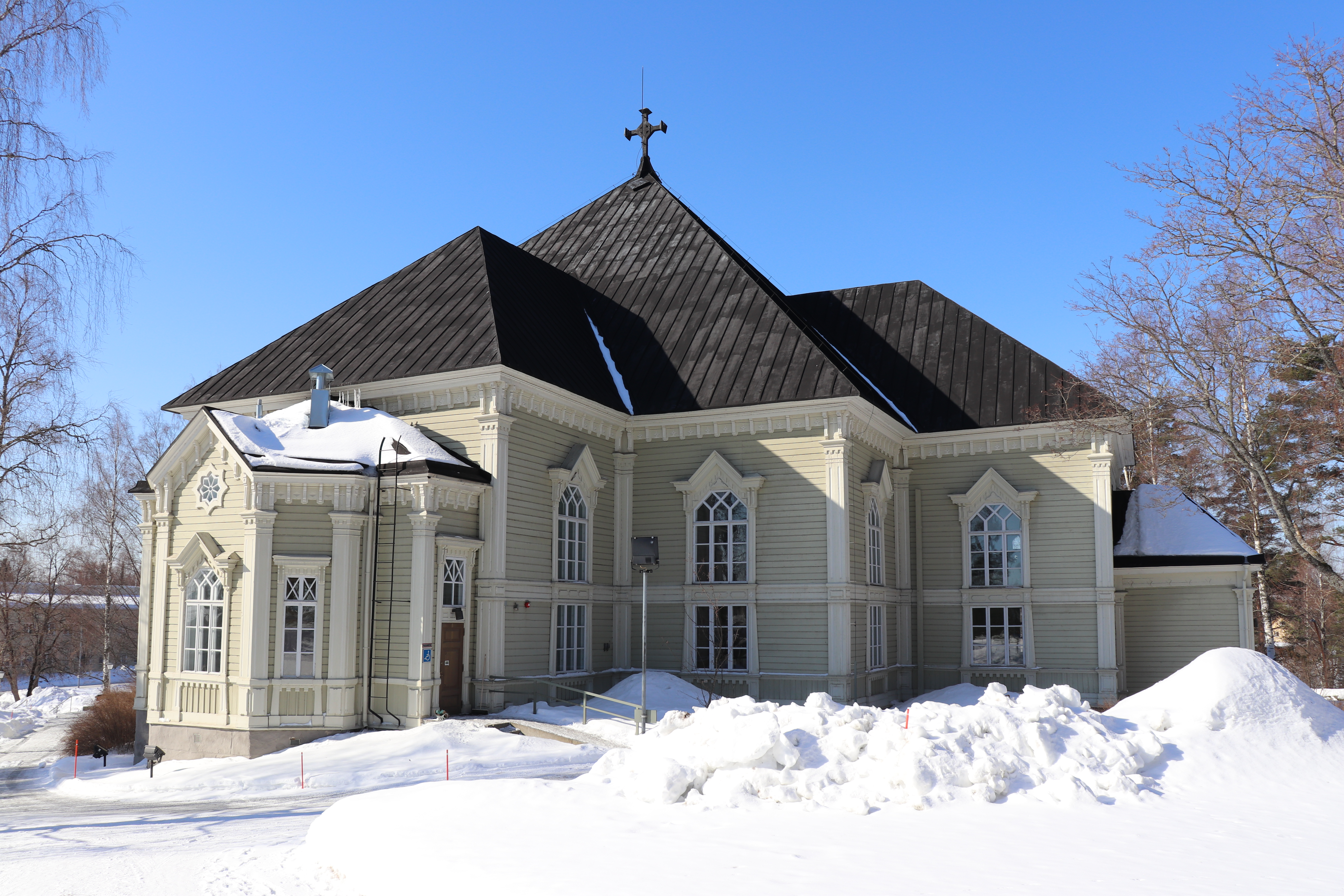
- Kangasniemi Church in April 2018.

Religion
- Affiliation: Evangelical Lutheran Church of Finland

Location
- Location: Kangasniemi, Finland
- Interactive map of Kangasniemi Church
- Coordinates: 61.99098°N 26.64482°E

Architecture
- Architect: Matti Salonen
- Completed: 1814
- Capacity: seats 1,500

Website
- www.kangasniemenseurakunta.fi

Kangasniemi Church (Finnish: Kangasniemen kirkko) is a wooden church located in Kangasniemi, Finland. The church and the adjacent bell tower were both designed by Matti Salonen. The church was built in 1811–1814 and baptized on 1 January 1815 by Aron Molander. It accommodates approximately 1,500 people.

== Gallery ==
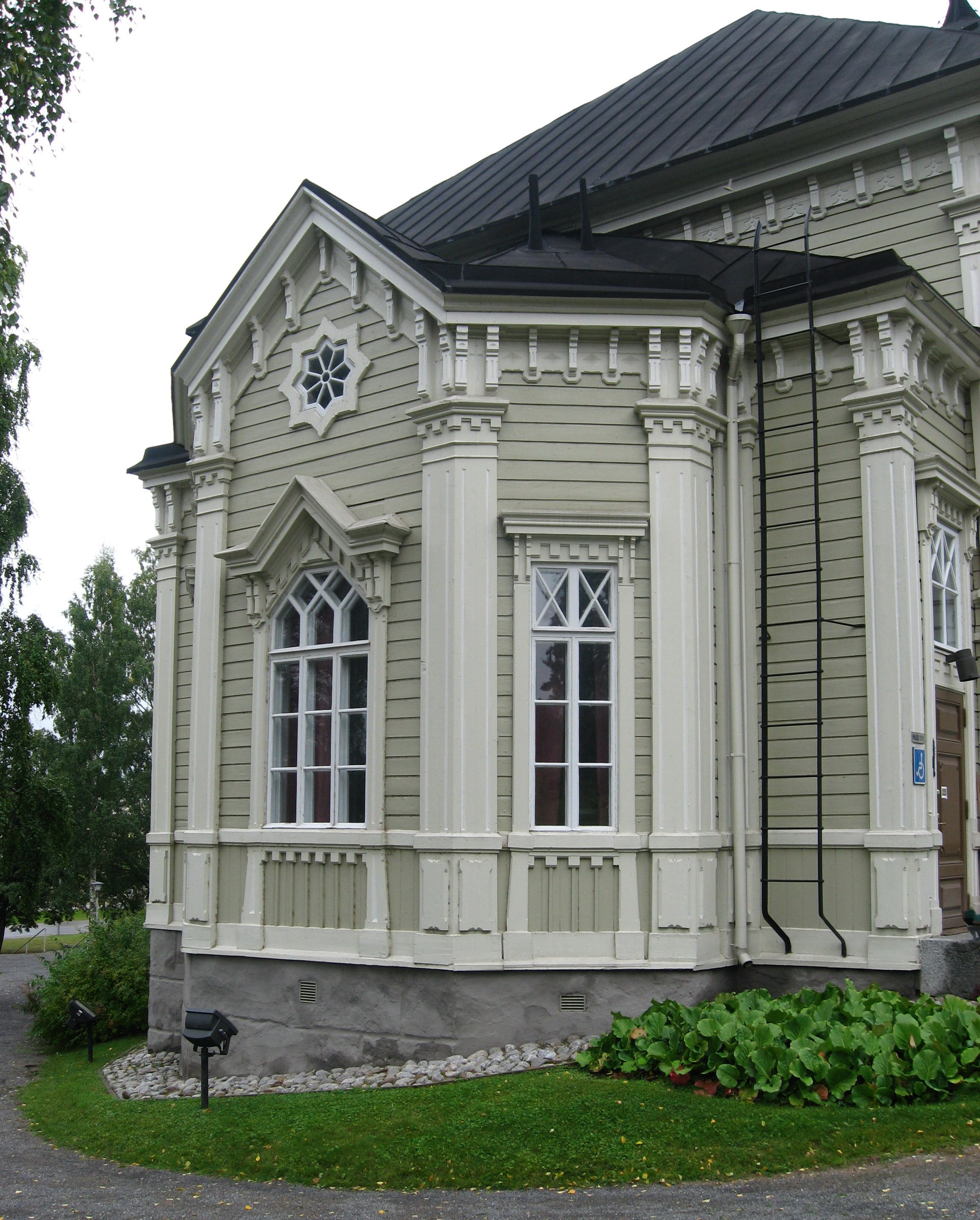
detail

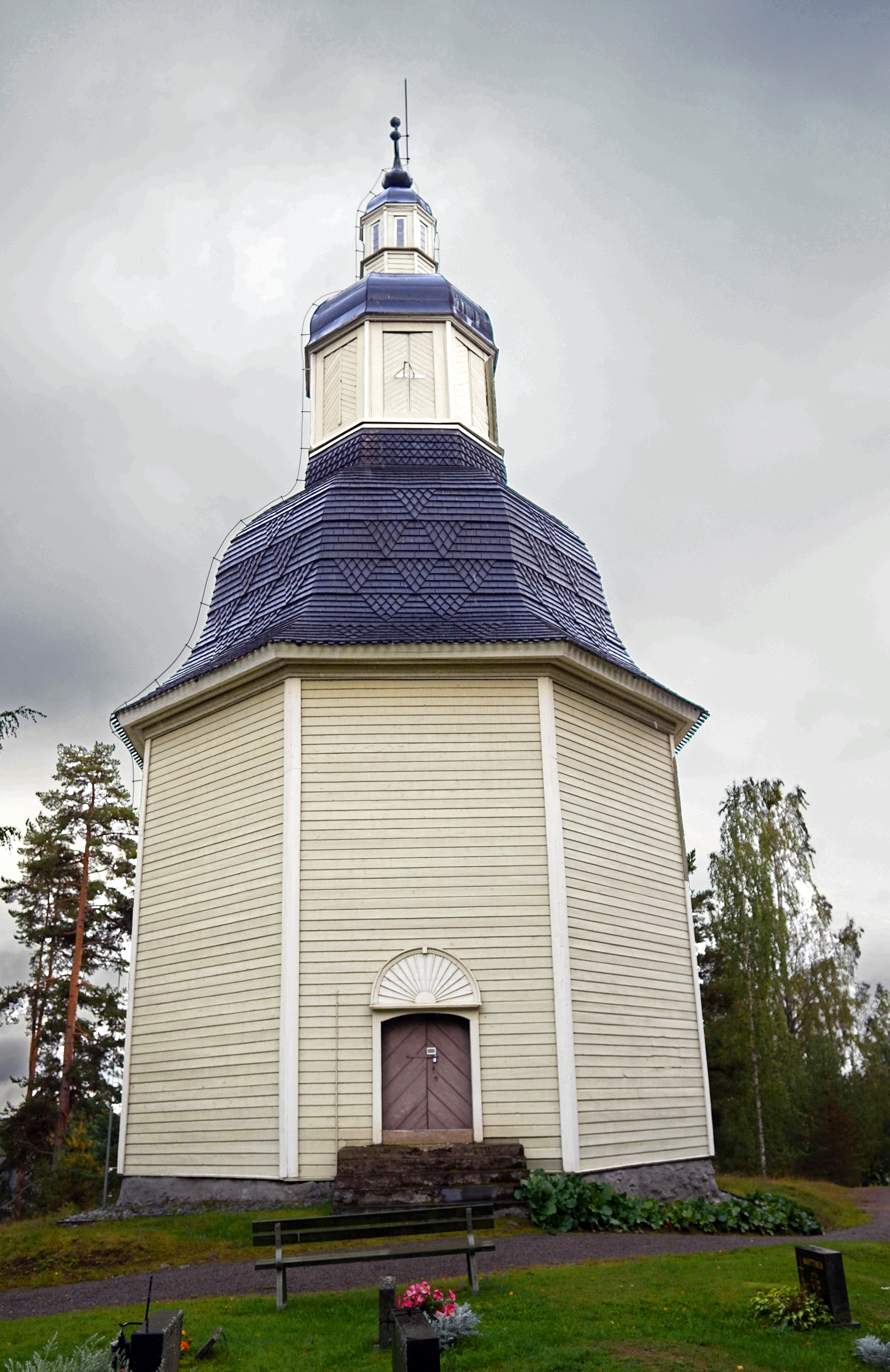
church bell tower

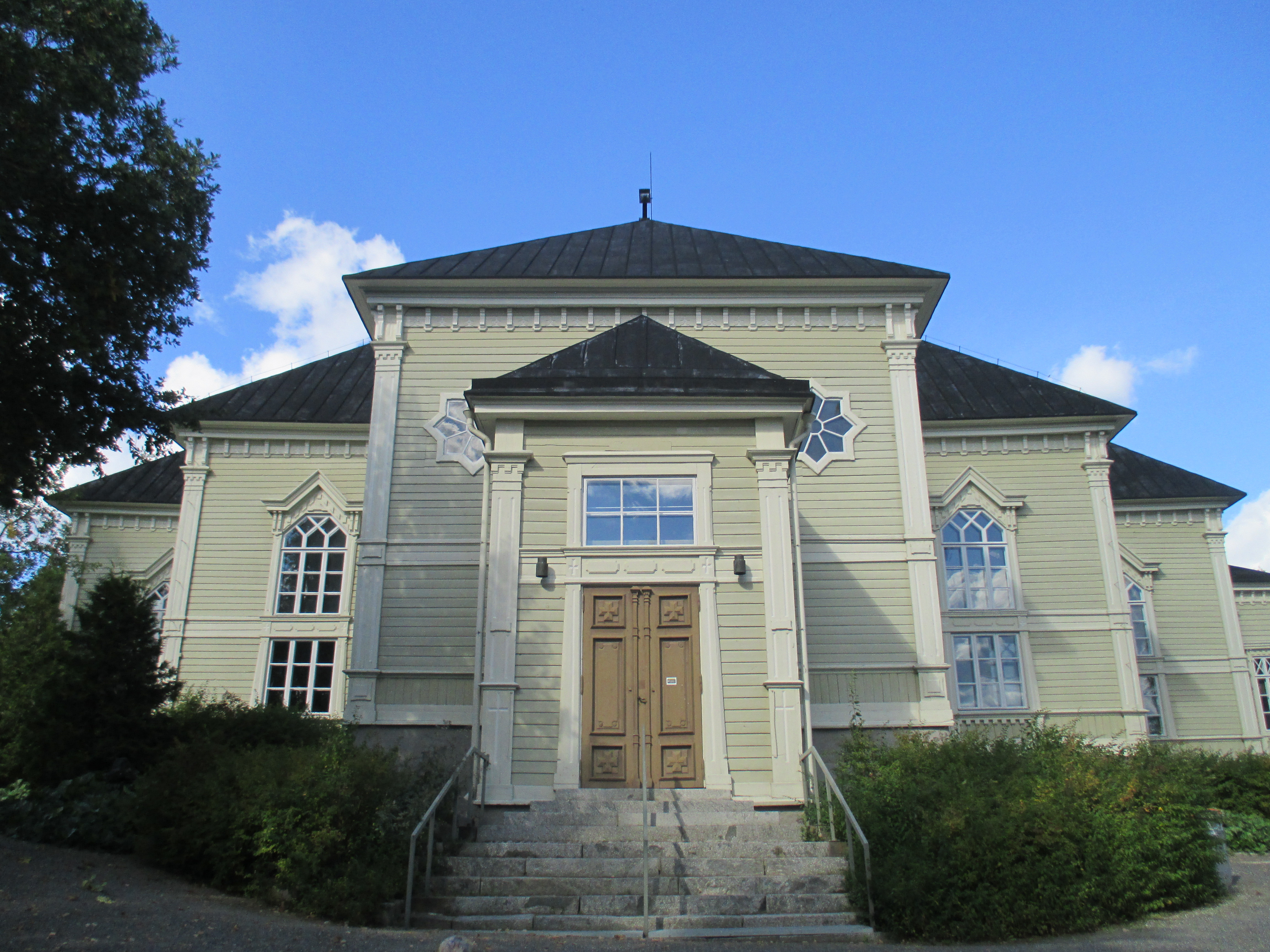
detail
