= Luhanka =

- Municipality
- Luhangan kunta Luhanka kommun
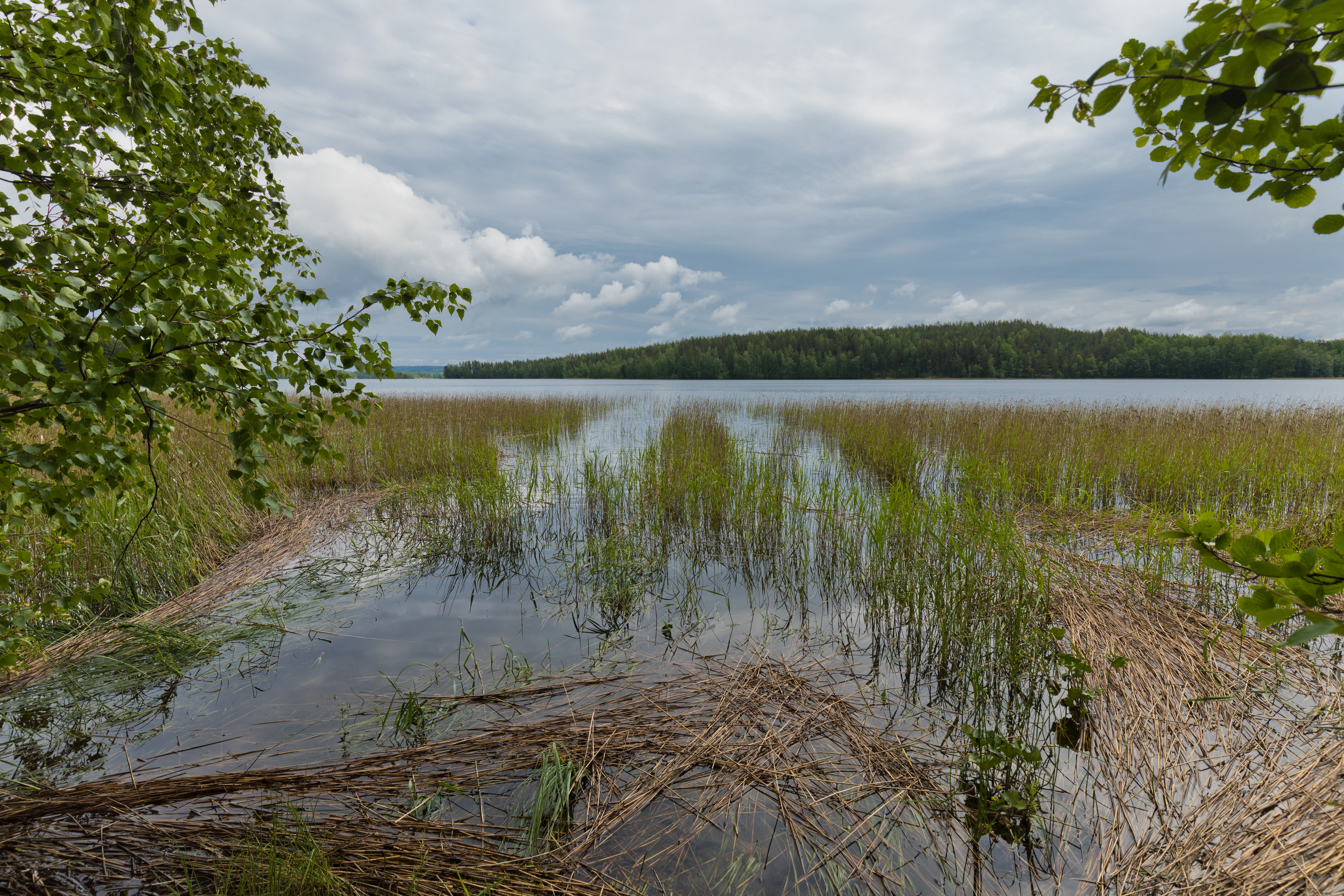

- Coat of arms

- Location of Luhanka in Finland
- Interactive map of Luhanka
- Coordinates: 61°48′N 025°42′E
- Country: Finland
- Region: Central Finland
- Sub-region: Joutsa
- Charter: 1864

Government
  - Municipal manager: Reijo Urtti

Area (2018-01-01)
  - Total: 313.25 km^{2} (120.95 sq mi)
  - Land: 214.5 km^{2} (82.8 sq mi)
  - Water: 98.73 km^{2} (38.12 sq mi)
  - Rank: 256th largest in Finland

Population (2025-12-31)
  - Total: 695
  - Rank: 299th largest in Finland
  - Density: 3.24/km^{2} (8.4/sq mi)

Population by native language
  - Finnish: 99.1% (official)
  - Others: 0.9%

Population by age
  - 0 to 14: 8.4%
  - 15 to 64: 49.9%
  - 65 or older: 41.6%
- Time zone: UTC+02:00 (EET)
  - Summer (DST): UTC+03:00 (EEST)
- Website: www.luhanka.fi

Luhanka (Swedish: Luhanka, also Luhango) is a municipality of Finland. It is located in the Central Finland region. The municipality has a population of 695 (31 December 2025) and covers an area of 313.25 square kilometres (120.95 sq mi) of which 98.73 km^{2} (38.12 sq mi) is water.

The population density is 3.24 inhabitants per square kilometre (8.4/sq mi). There are also many summertime cottages in Luhanka.

The municipality is unilingually Finnish. The municipality is also been known as "Luhango" in Swedish documents.

Mimicking the badger in the coat of arms of Luhanka, the permanent residents include the official animal mascot of the municipality, Sisu the Badger (Sisu-mäyrä).

== Geography ==
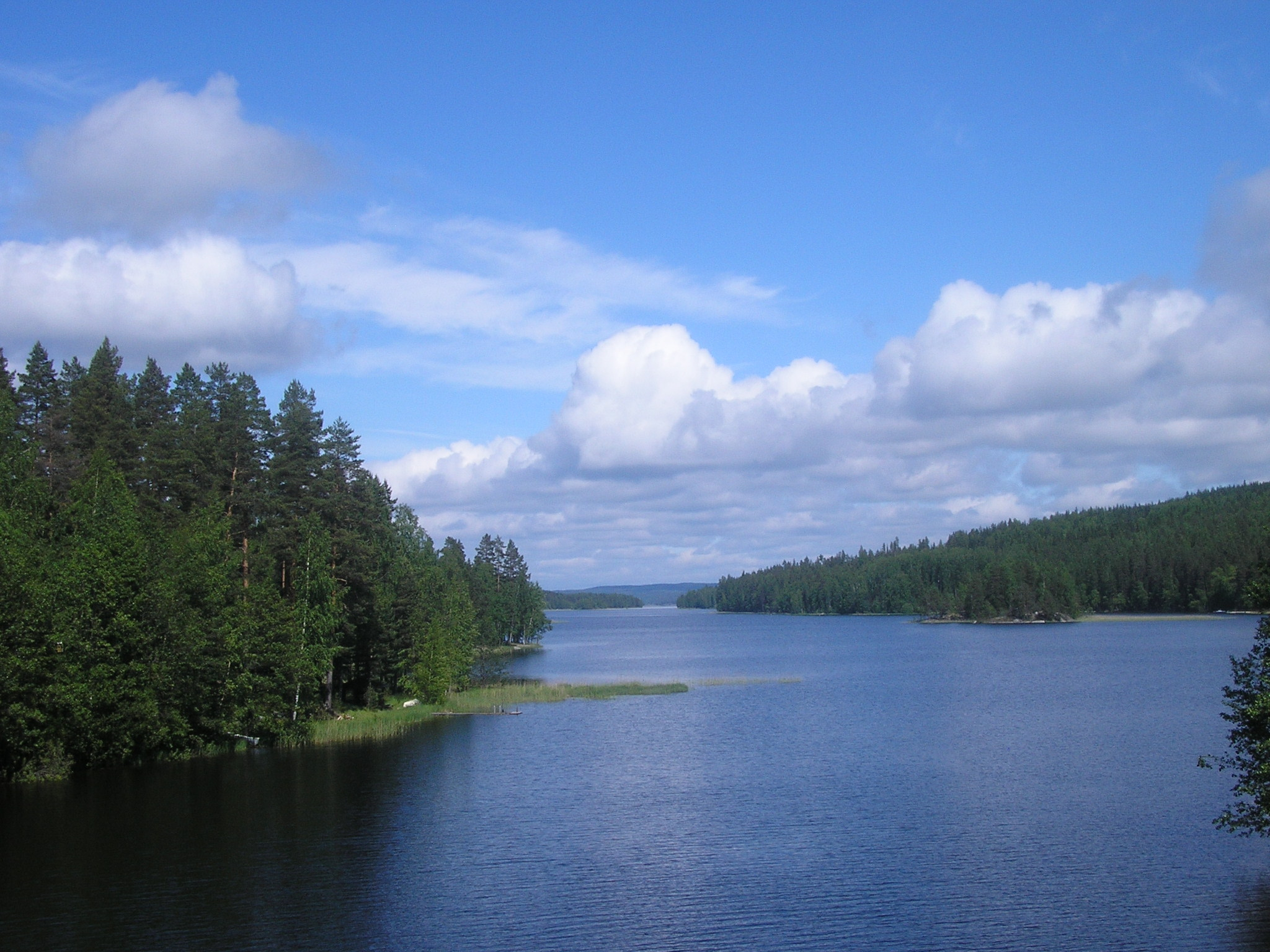
Hopeasalmi, Lake Päijänne

Neighboring municipalities are Hartola, Joutsa, Jyväskylä, Jämsä, Kuhmoinen and Sysmä.

There are all together 61 lakes in Luhanka. Biggest lakes in Luhanka are Päijänne, Tammijärvi-Hauha and Jutilanjärvi.

== History ==
Luhanka was first mentioned as a village within the Sysmä parish in 1462. The village gets its name from the lake Luhankjärvi or Luhankajärvi, the name of which comes from the word luha, a variant of luhta, a word which refers to a type of swamp. -nka is a derivational suffix, which is also found in other place names such as Puolanka and Maaninka.

It was granted a chapel in 1767 and became a separate parish in 1864. Due to the small population of the municipality, the parish of Luhanka became subordinate to the parish of Joutsa in 2006.

== Notable people ==
- Politician Hertta Kuusinen was born in Luhanka in 1904
- Writer Kreetta Onkeli has spent childhood in Luhanka
- Composer Toni Edelmann lived in Luhanka
