= Havumäki =

Village in Central Finland, Finland

Coordinates: 61°59′N 26°16′E

Havumäki was a village within the municipality of Leivonmäki, Finland, itself a small town of only 1162 people (2003), until Leivonmäki was incorporated into Joutsa in 2008. Located in the Central Finland region, approximately 235 kilometers (146 mi) from Helsinki, Havumäki enjoys the moderate climate of the central region, in spite of its northern situation at latitude 61.9833 North.

== Havumäki as a surname ==
Perhaps owing to the pastoral environs of the village of Havumaki, a small family of Swedish immigrants bearing the impolitic Swedish-sounding last name Anderson changed their name to Havumäki in the period immediately following the Finnish Civil War. The political climate in Finland at the time was not favorable towards those with identifiable Swedish heritage. Residing in the town of Kotka, closer to the Russian Border than to Sweden, the Anderson clan likely contrived their family name because it meant "evergreen hill" (or spruce hill), and not because of any personal connection to the small hamlet. Nonetheless, several prominent individuals have borne this name, including renowned psychology professor Sulo Havumäki, who, while working at Bemidji State College in Minnesota, popularized the made-up legend of St. Urho. The legend honors the (supposed) patron saint of Finland, who drove the infamous grape-crop destroying grasshoppers out of Finland. Another prominent bearer of this surname is Kalle Havumäki - a promising young rap artist.
