= Kangasniemi =

- Municipality
- Kangasniemen kunta Kangasniemi kommun
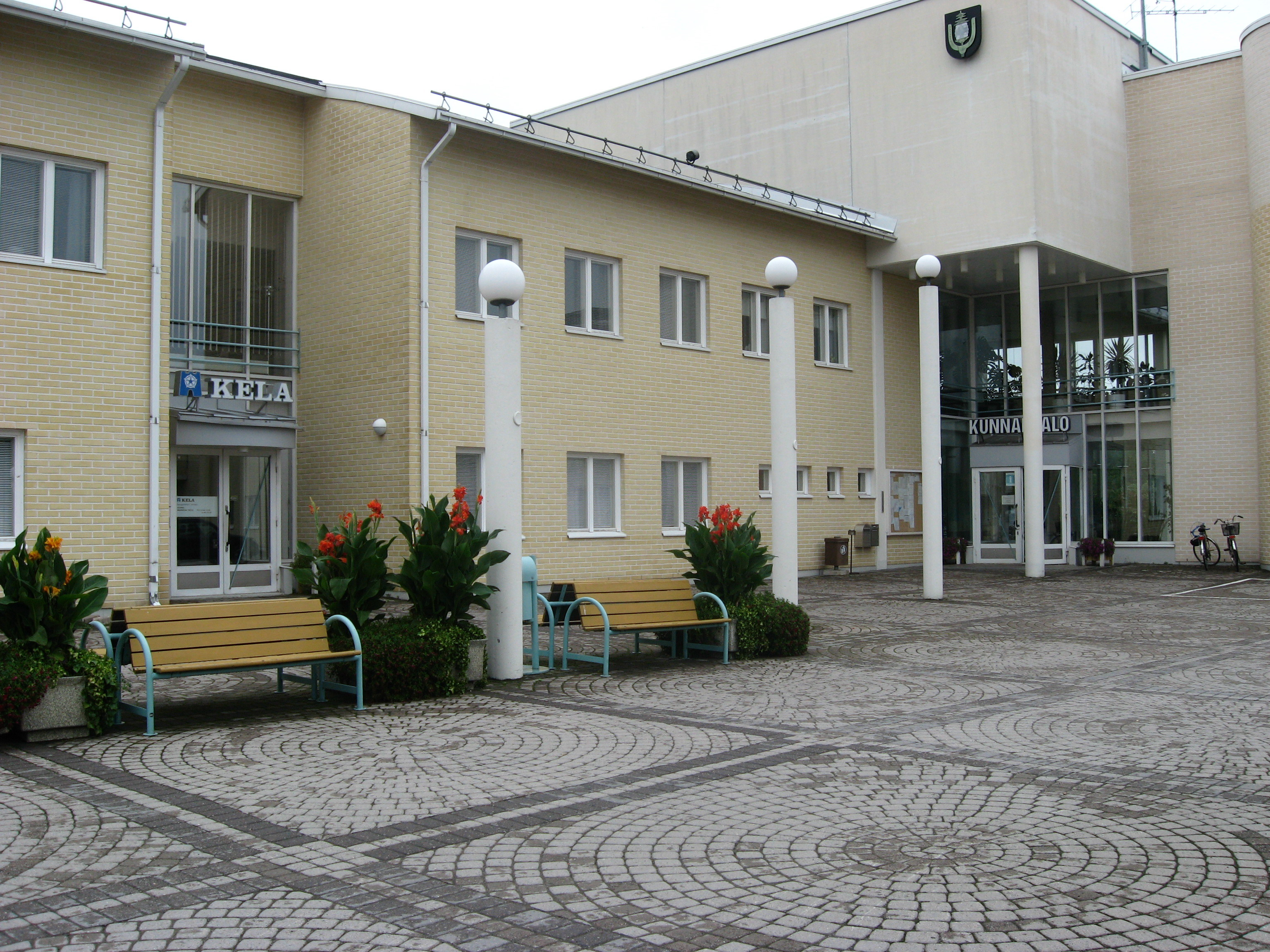
- Kangasniemi town hall

- Coat of arms

- Location of Kangasniemi in Finland
- Interactive map of Kangasniemi
- Coordinates: 61°59.4′N 026°38.5′E
- Country: Finland
- Region: South Savo
- Sub-region: Mikkeli
- Charter: 1867

Government
  - Municipal manager: Kimmo Kainulainen

Area (2018-01-01)
  - Total: 1,326.75 km^{2} (512.26 sq mi)
  - Land: 1,068.89 km^{2} (412.70 sq mi)
  - Water: 256.86 km^{2} (99.17 sq mi)
  - Rank: 73rd largest in Finland

Population (2025-12-31)
  - Total: 4,952
  - Rank: 164th largest in Finland
  - Density: 4.63/km^{2} (12.0/sq mi)

Population by native language
  - Finnish: 95.9% (official)
  - Swedish: 0.2%
  - Others: 3.9%

Population by age
  - 0 to 14: 11.8%
  - 15 to 64: 51.5%
  - 65 or older: 36.7%
- Time zone: UTC+02:00 (EET)
  - Summer (DST): UTC+03:00 (EEST)
- Website: www.kangasniemi.fi/en/

Kangasniemi (Finnish: [ˈkɑŋːɑsˌnie̯mi]) is a municipality in the South Savo region, Finland. The municipality has a population of 4,952 (31 December 2025) and covers an area of 1,326.75 square kilometres (512.26 sq mi) of which 256.86 km^{2} (99.17 sq mi) is water. The population density is 4.63 inhabitants per square kilometre (12.0/sq mi).

Kangasniemi is located on the Finnish national road 13, 50 km (31 mi) northwest of Mikkeli and 63 km (39 mi) southeast of Jyväskylä. Distance to the national capital, Helsinki is 250 km (160 mi). Its neighbour municipalities are Hankasalmi, Hirvensalmi, Joutsa, Mikkeli, Pieksämäki and Toivakka.

There are almost 3600 (May 2014) summer houses, and summer guests redouble the number of inhabitants during the summer months.

The municipality is unilingually Finnish.

== History ==
The municipality was founded in 1867.

== Nature ==
There are more than 1,550 kilometres (960 mi) of shoreline. The largest lakes are Puulavesi and Kyyvesi. Other lakes include Mallos and Synsiä. In 1997, Kangasniemi was voted the most beautiful municipality in Finland by television show.

== Economy ==
Kangasniemi has large forest resources, approximately 12,000,000 cubic metres (420,000,000 cu ft), and the yearly growth is approximately 500,000 m^{3} (18,000,000 cu ft). There is also Puula golf field.

== Famous natives ==
- Emilie Björkstén, poet
- Hilding Ekelund, architect
- Otto Manninen, writer, poet and translator
- Tepa Reinikainen, shot putter
- Hiski Salomaa, singer and songwriter
- Virpi Sarasvuo, née Kuitunen, cross-country skier
- Sami Sarjula, actor
- Martti Tolamo, athlete

== Gallery ==
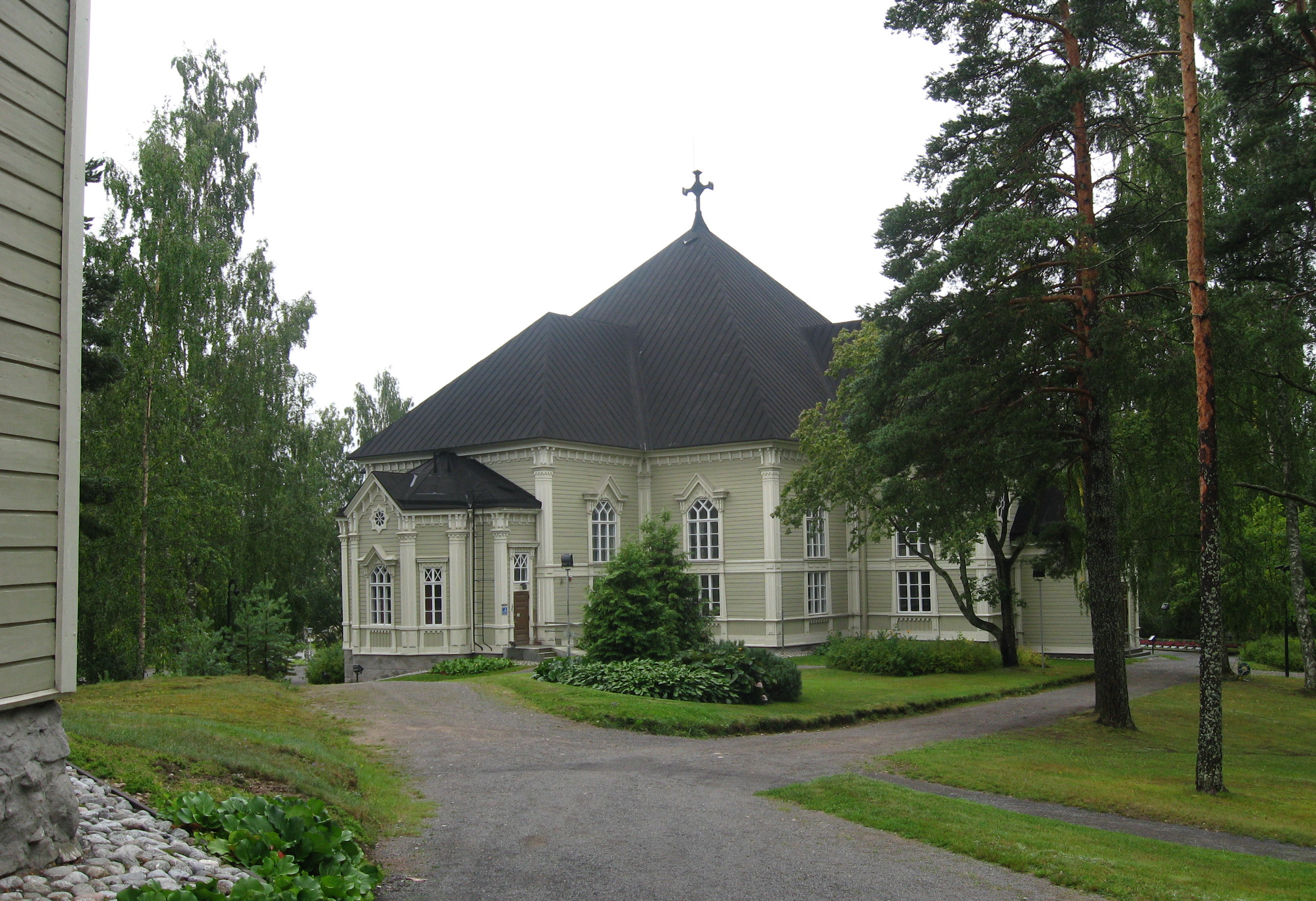
Church

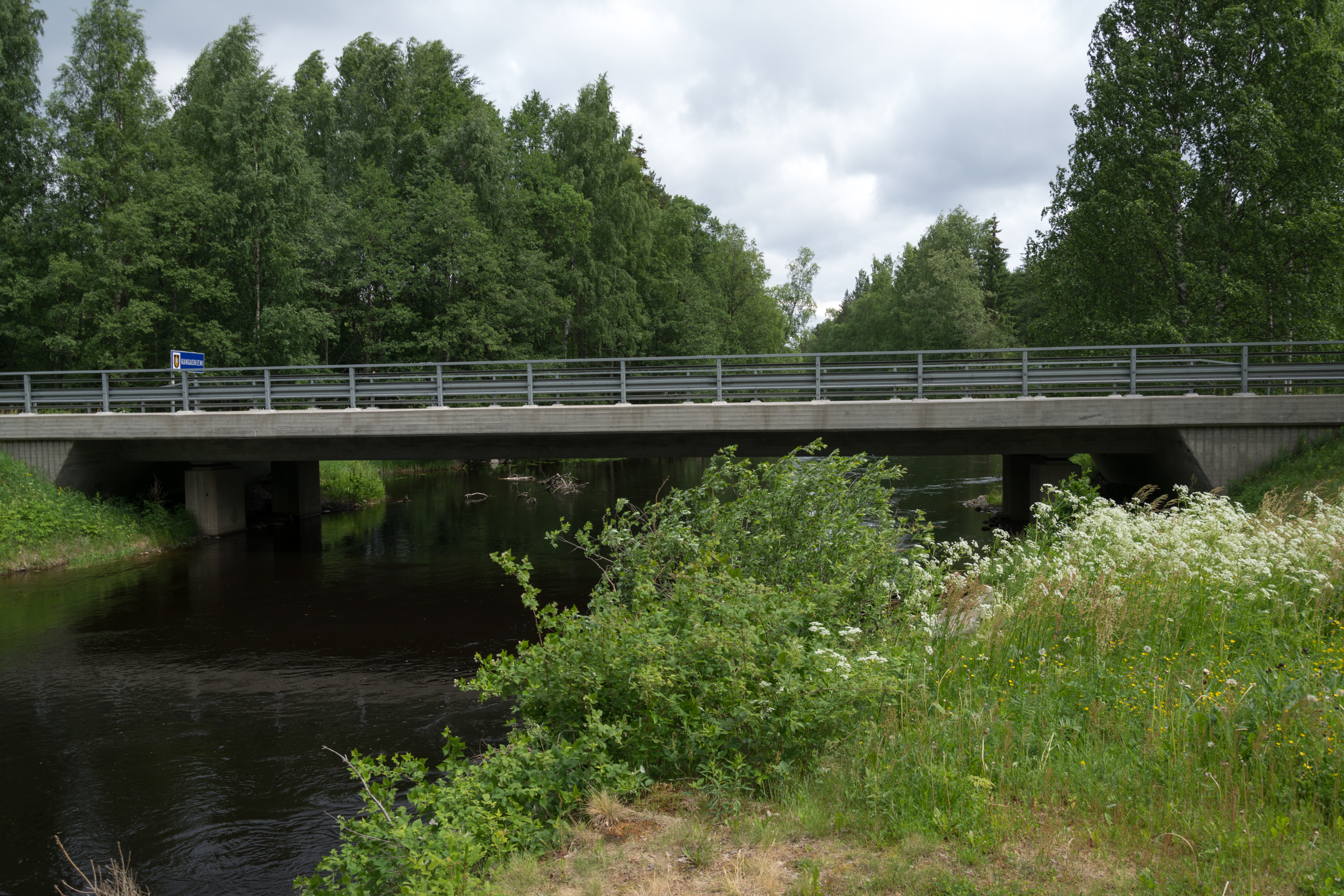
Läsäkoski canal

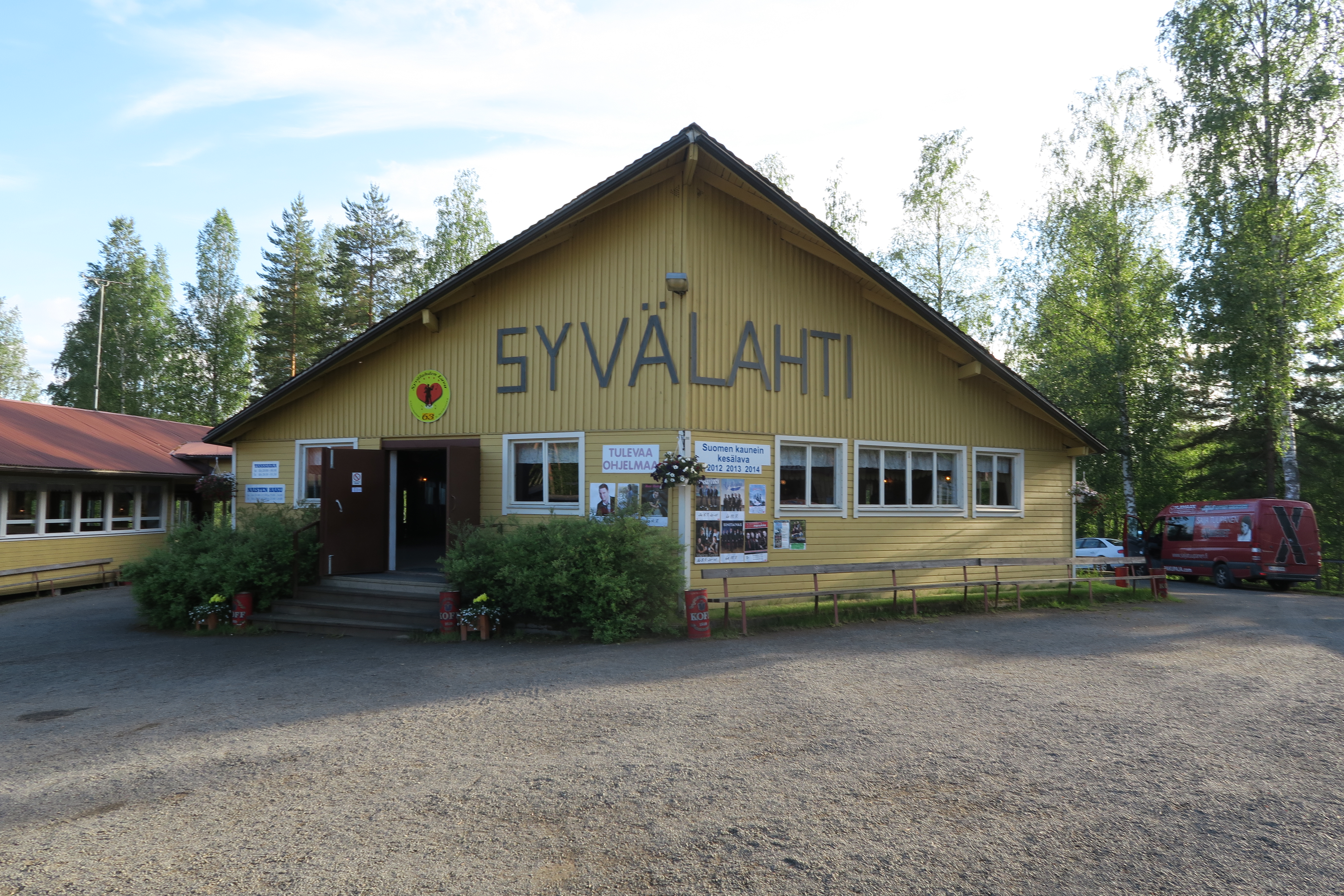
Syvälahden lava

== See also ==
- Kangasniemi Church
