= Kyyvesi =

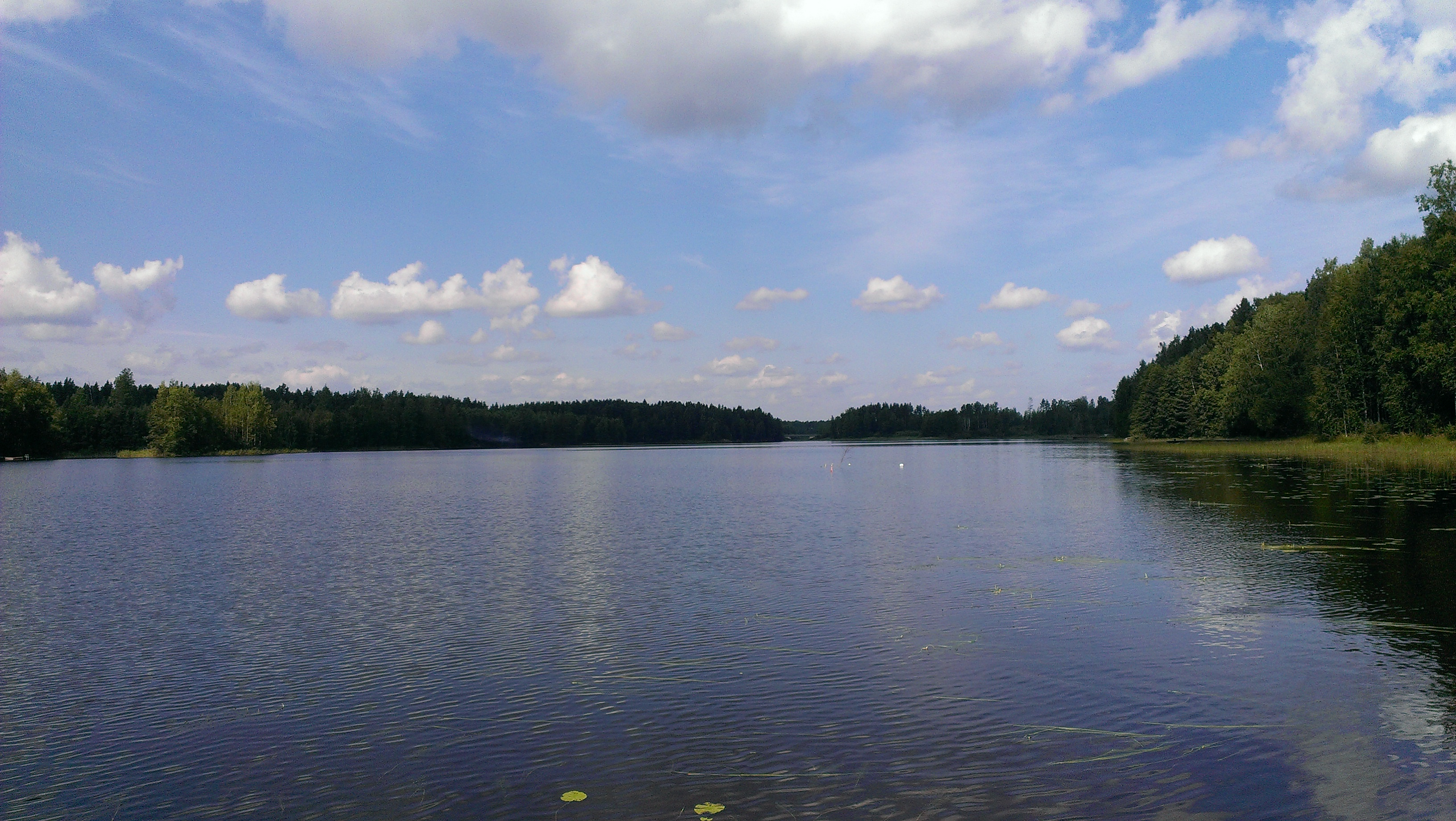

- Location within Finland
- Location: Mikkeli
- Coordinates: 61°58′N 27°07′E
- Type: Lake
- Catchment area: Kymijoki
- Basin countries: Finland
- Surface area: 129.947 km^{2} (50.173 sq mi)
- Average depth: 4.39 m (14.4 ft)
- Max. depth: 35.25 m (115.6 ft)
- Water volume: 0.57 km^{3} (460,000 acre⋅ft)
- Shore length^{1}: 857.26 km (532.68 mi)
- Surface elevation: 100.65 m (330.2 ft)
- Frozen: December–April
- Islands: Emäsalo, Honkasalo, Porosaari, Riuttasaari
- ^{1} Shore length is not a well-defined measure.

Kyyvesi (transl. Viper Water) is a rather large lake in the Southern Savonia region of Finland. It has a surface area of 129,95 km², is very shallow and extremely rocky. Motorboating on Kyyvesi is recommended only for very experienced boaters as many of the rocks have not been mapped. Also, the limited amount of landing sites is a hindrance in moving swiftly through the lake. A general bathymetric chart was completed in 2006. Canoes, kayaks and rowing boats are recommended for visitors. There is a two-lake canoeing route Kyyvesi–Puula with nice little harbours. The water is dark for the catchment area is mostly swampy terrain. Locals claim that two sorts of zander fishes live in the lake.

== See also ==
- List of lakes in Finland
