= Hartola, Finland =

Hartola Gustav Adolfs (Swedish)
- Municipality
- Hartolan kunta Gustav Adolfs kommun
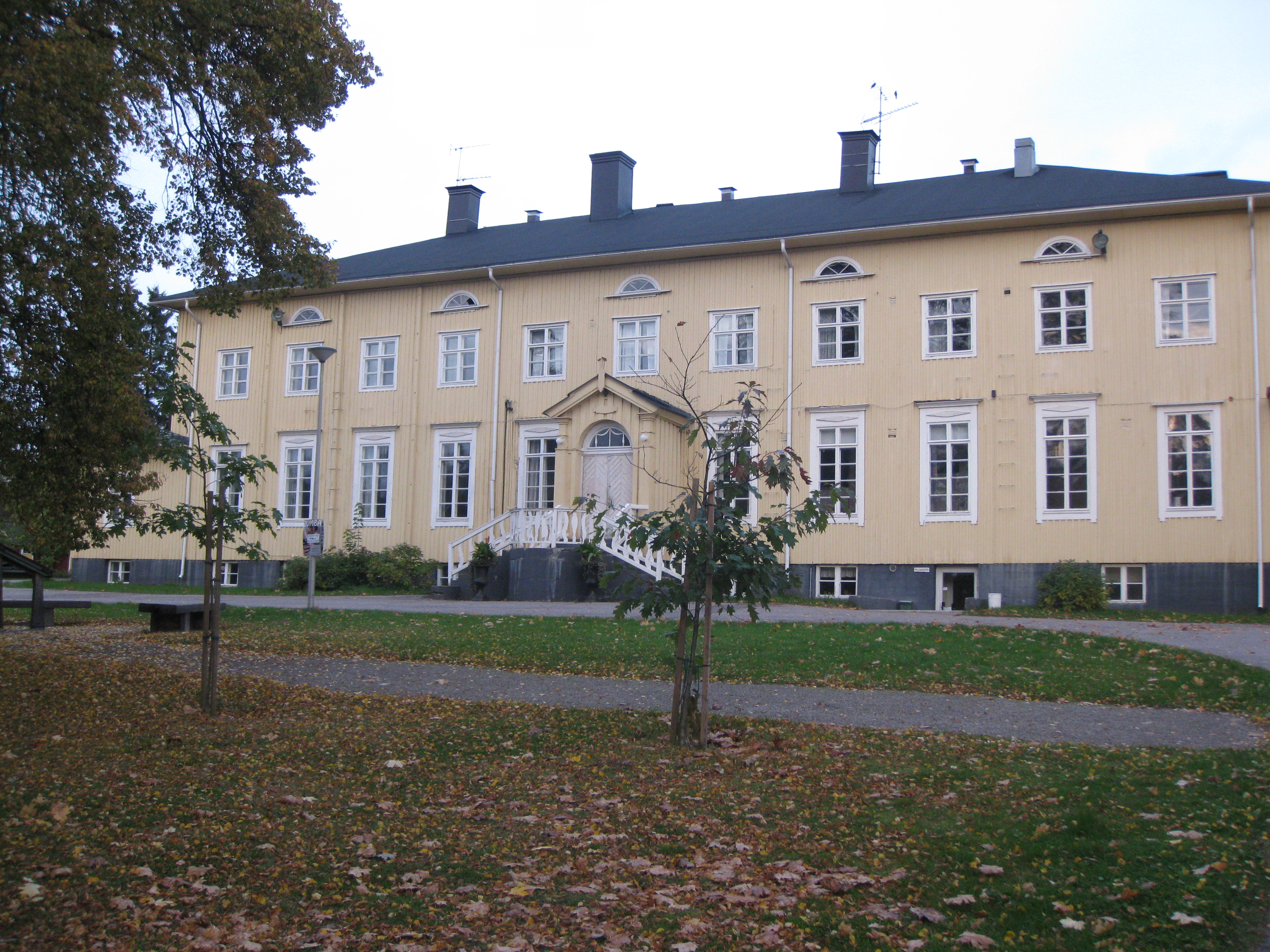
- Eastern Tavastia College (Itä-Hämeen opisto) in Hartola

- Coat of arms

- Location of Hartola in Finland
- Interactive map of Hartola
- Coordinates: 61°35′N 026°01′E
- Country: Finland
- Region: Päijät-Häme
- Sub-region: Heinola
- Charter: 1784

Government
  - Municipal manager: Jarkko Seppälä

Population (2025-12-31)
  - Total: 2,401
  - Rank: 234th largest in Finland
  - Density: 0/km^{2} (0/sq mi)

Population by native language
  - Finnish: 96% (official)
  - Others: 4%
- Time zone: UTC+02:00 (EET)
  - Summer (DST): UTC+03:00 (EEST)
- Website: hartola.fi

Hartola (Swedish: Gustav Adolfs) is a municipality of Finland. It is located in the Itä-Häme, Päijät-Häme region. The municipality has a population of 2,401 (31 December 2025), which make it the smallest municipality in Päijät-Häme in terms of population. It covers an area of 675.38 square kilometres (260.77 sq mi) of which 132.18 km^{2} (51.03 sq mi) is water. The population density is 4.42 inhabitants per square kilometre (11.4/sq mi). Neighbouring municipalities are Heinola, Joutsa, Luhanka, Pertunmaa and Sysmä.

The municipality is unilingually Finnish. The municipality is also known as "Gustav Adolfs" in Swedish. Hartola is home to the Itä-Hämeen Museo, the regional museum for seven municipalities.

Since 1987, the town has billed itself as a sovereign royal parish based upon a 1784 proclamation by King Gustav III of Sweden creating a new parish on the eastern border of his kingdom in honor of his son, Gustav Adolf.

At every first Saturday in September, there is a fair at Hartola. The event is biggest in Finland at its genre.

The municipality is also known as the writer Maila Talvio's place of birth.

== History ==
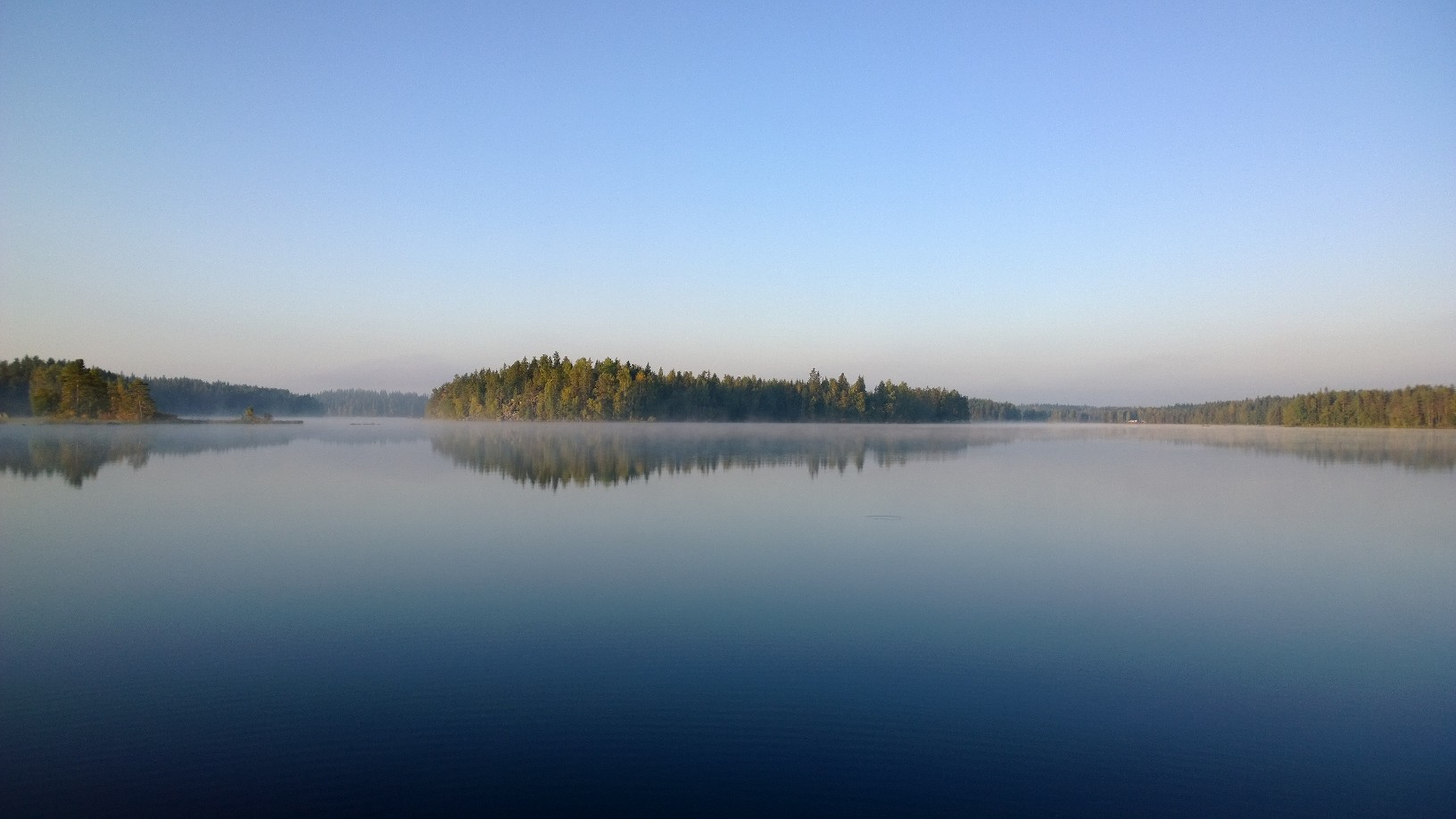
Lake Salajärvi in Lepsala Village, Hartola, Finland

Hartola may have been mentioned as early as 1398 (ut ecclesia parrochialis Hartola Aboensis dioceses), however this may have also referred to Hattula. It was originally a part of the parish of Sysmä. At least between 1540 and 1729, it was called Koskipää, after which the name Hartola appears again.

Hartola became an independent parish in 1784. It was also granted the Swedish name Gustav Adolfs. In Finnish, the parish was also known as Kustavus, Kustavuksenpitäjä and Kustaanpitäjä, but the name Hartola was still in use. By the late 1800s, Hartola had become the sole name for the parish.

Joutsa was a part of Hartola until 1860, while Leivonmäki was a part of Hartola until 1880.

== Villages ==
- Hangastaipale
- Kalho, writer Mika Waltari wrote The Egyptian here.
- Koitti
- Kuivajärvi
- Kumu
- Lepsala
- Murakka
- Nokka
- Putkijärvi
- Siltasuo
- Vuorenkylä is a northernmost village in Päijät-Häme

All schools those located in villages have been closed. School system in Hartola is about 140 years old.

== Demographics ==
Historical population
Year	Pop.	±%
1950	6,778	—
1960	6,486	−4.3%
1970	5,504	−15.1%
1980	4,588	−16.6%
1990	4,352	−5.1%
2000	3,837	−11.8%
2010	3,355	−12.6%
2020	2,655	−20.9%
Source: Doria, Statistics Finland
