= Hirvensalmi =

- Municipality
- Hirvensalmen kunta Hirvensalmi kommun
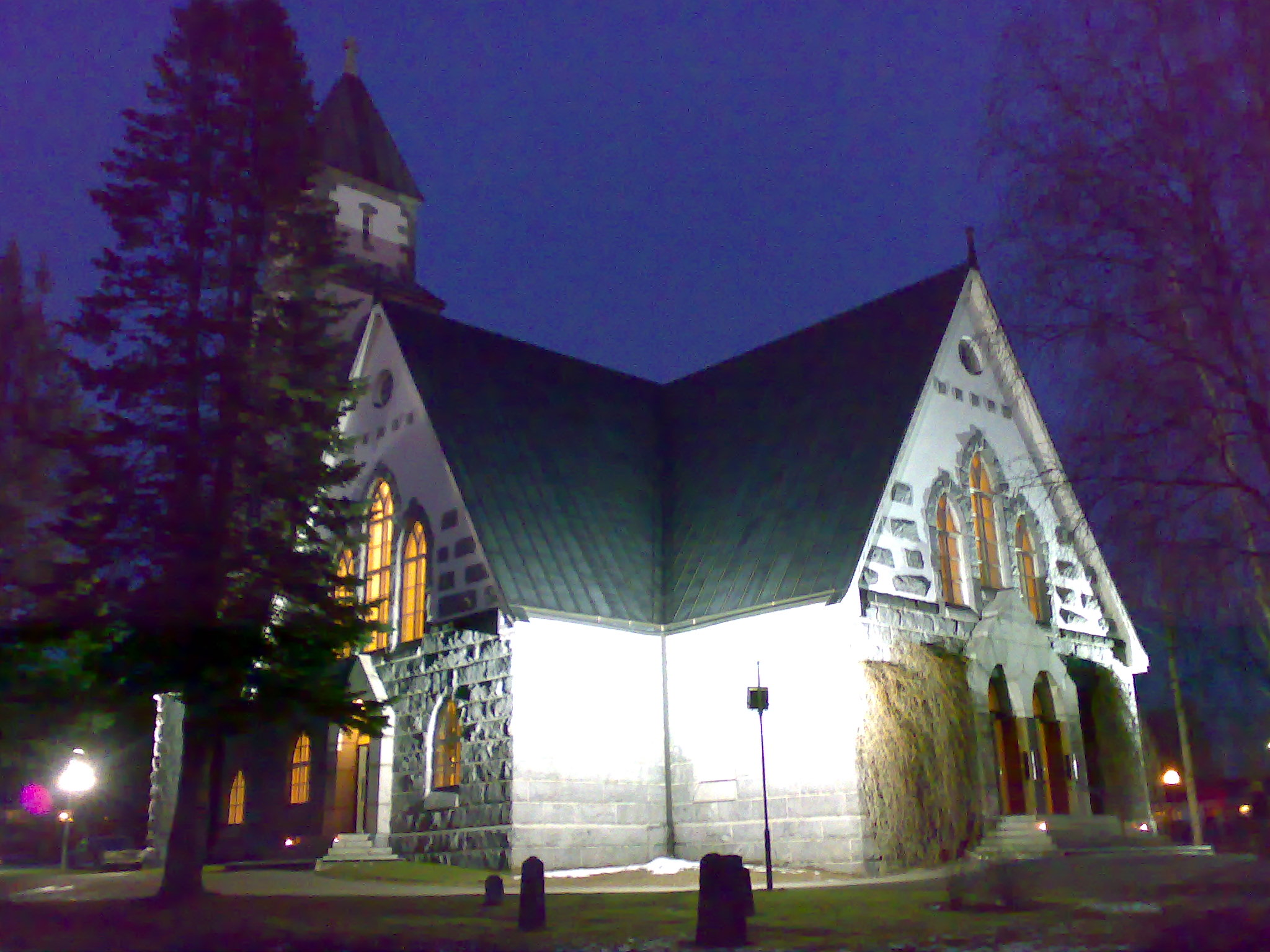
- Hirvensalmi Church

- Coat of arms

- Location of Hirvensalmi in Finland
- Interactive map of Hirvensalmi
- Coordinates: 61°38.5′N 026°47′E
- Country: Finland
- Region: South Savo
- Sub-region: Mikkeli
- Charter: 1656

Government
  - Municipal manager: Vesa Ellonen

Area (2018-01-01)
  - Total: 746.59 km^{2} (288.26 sq mi)
  - Land: 465.09 km^{2} (179.57 sq mi)
  - Water: 281.2 km^{2} (108.6 sq mi)
  - Rank: 186th largest in Finland

Population (2025-12-31)
  - Total: 2,023
  - Rank: 253rd largest in Finland
  - Density: 4.35/km^{2} (11.3/sq mi)

Population by native language
  - Finnish: 96.7% (official)
  - Others: 3.3%

Population by age
  - 0 to 14: 10.9%
  - 15 to 64: 52.1%
  - 65 or older: 37%
- Time zone: UTC+02:00 (EET)
  - Summer (DST): UTC+03:00 (EEST)
- Website: Official website

Hirvensalmi (Finnish: [ˈhirvenˌsɑlmi]) is a municipality of Finland.

It is located in the South Savo region. The municipality has a population of 2,023 (31 December 2025) and covers an area of 746.59 square kilometres (288.26 sq mi) of which 281.2 km^{2} (108.6 sq mi) is water. The population density is 4.35 inhabitants per square kilometre (11.3/sq mi).

Neighbour municipalities: Joutsa, Kangasniemi, Mikkeli, Mäntyharju and Pertunmaa.

Hirvensalmi is often said to be an island municipality. Most people live on the mainland, but living on an island is not unheard of. Most islands, though, are only inhabited during the summer holidays, when holidaymakers come mainly from Southern Finland and double the population of Hirvensalmi. In the north lake Puula marks the border of Hirvensalmi and Kangasniemi, and in the west lake Suontee separates it from Joutsa.

The municipality is unilingual Finnish.

== Some villages ==
Hirvenlahti, Hirvensalmi, Hämeenmäki, Kekkola, Kilkki, Kissakoski, Kotkatvesi, Kuitula, Lahnaniemi, Lelkola, Malvaniemi, Monikkala, Noitti, Pääskynsaari, Suonsalmi, Syväsmäki, Vahvamäki, Vahvaselkä, and Väisälä.
