= Leivonmäki =

- Former municipality
- Leivonmäen kunta Leivonmäki kommun
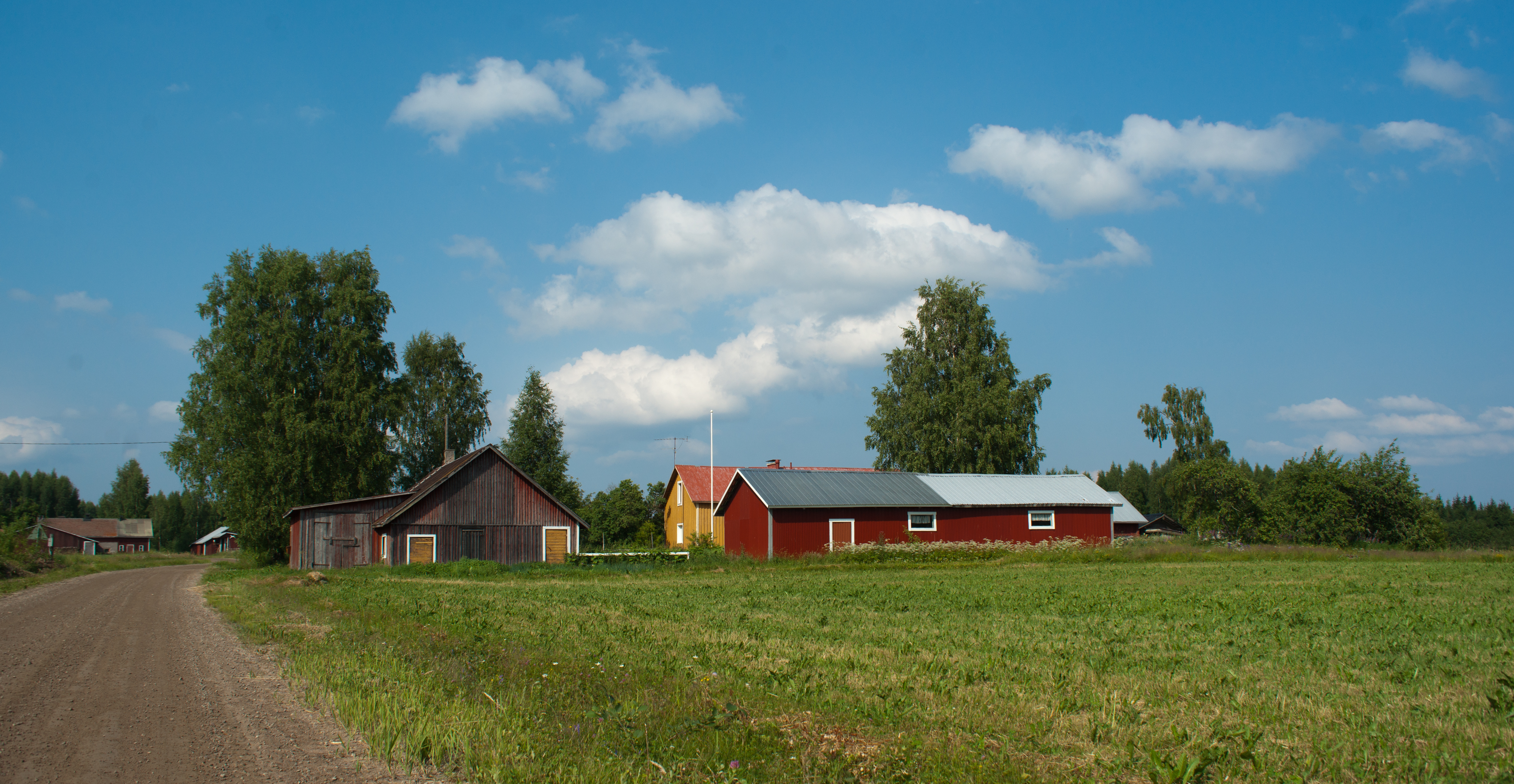
- Farms in Leivonmäki

- Coat of arms

- Location of Leivonmäki in Finland
- Coordinates: 61°54′55″N 026°07′25″E
- Country: Finland
- Province: Western Finland Province
- Region: Central Finland
- Established: 1868
- Merged into Joutsa: 2008
- Seat: Leivonmäen kirkonkylä

Area
  - Land: 380.8 km^{2} (147.0 sq mi)

Population (2007-12-31)
  - Total: 1,135

Leivonmäki is a former municipality of Finland in the Central Finland region. The municipality was consolidated with Joutsa in 2008. The population of Leivonmäki was 1,135 in 2007.

It is located 40 kilometres (25 mi) south-east from Jyväskylä. It is known for its marshy grounds and its national park.

The municipality was unilingually Finnish.

== Geography ==
Bogs and other wetlands make up roughly 18,100 hectares (45,000 acres) or 48% of the former municipality's area, the average in Central Finland being 25%. The largest wetlands are Kivisuo, Haapasuo, Havusuo, Rokasuo and Höystösensuo. Leivonmäki has fewer lakes than the Central Finnish average as it is located on a drainage divide area within the Kymijoki basin. The largest lake is Rutajärvi, which discharges into the Päijänne.

=== Villages ===
The following villages have or have had their own school district:

- Etu-Ikola
- Havumäki
- Kirkonkylä
- Kivisuo
- Rutalahti
- Savenaho
- Taka-Ikola
- Tikanmäki
- Vartiamäki

A part of the municipality also belonged to the Vallaspelto school district, the village of Vallaspelto itself being part of Joutsa. Kurkijärvi also had its own short-lived school between 1933–1937.

== Naming and etymology ==
The name of Leivonmäki was first attested in 1564 as Leijuomäki. Mäki is Finnish for "hill" and the parish church is located by a hill called Kuhasenmäki, which therefore may have originally been called Leivonmäki or Leivomäki. According to Väinö Voionmaa, Leivonmäki may also have been named after the Leivonen farm in the village of Anajala in Sääksmäki.

The initial element is most likely the word leivo "skylark", though linguist Terho Itkonen also considered the possibility of the dialectal variant Levonmäki being the original form of the name. According to this explanation, the initial element would be lepo (genitive: levon) meaning "rest", referring to a resting place for cattle. However, the name is written with an i in most documents from the Swedish era, and the name was in use before the area was settled permanently – before cattle could have been kept in the area. The form Levonmäki may also be due to the Savonian pronunciation of leivo as "leevo".

== Twinnings ==
Leivonmäki was twinned with the Estonian Haaslava Parish.
