= Puumala =

- Municipality
- Puumalan kunta Puumala kommun
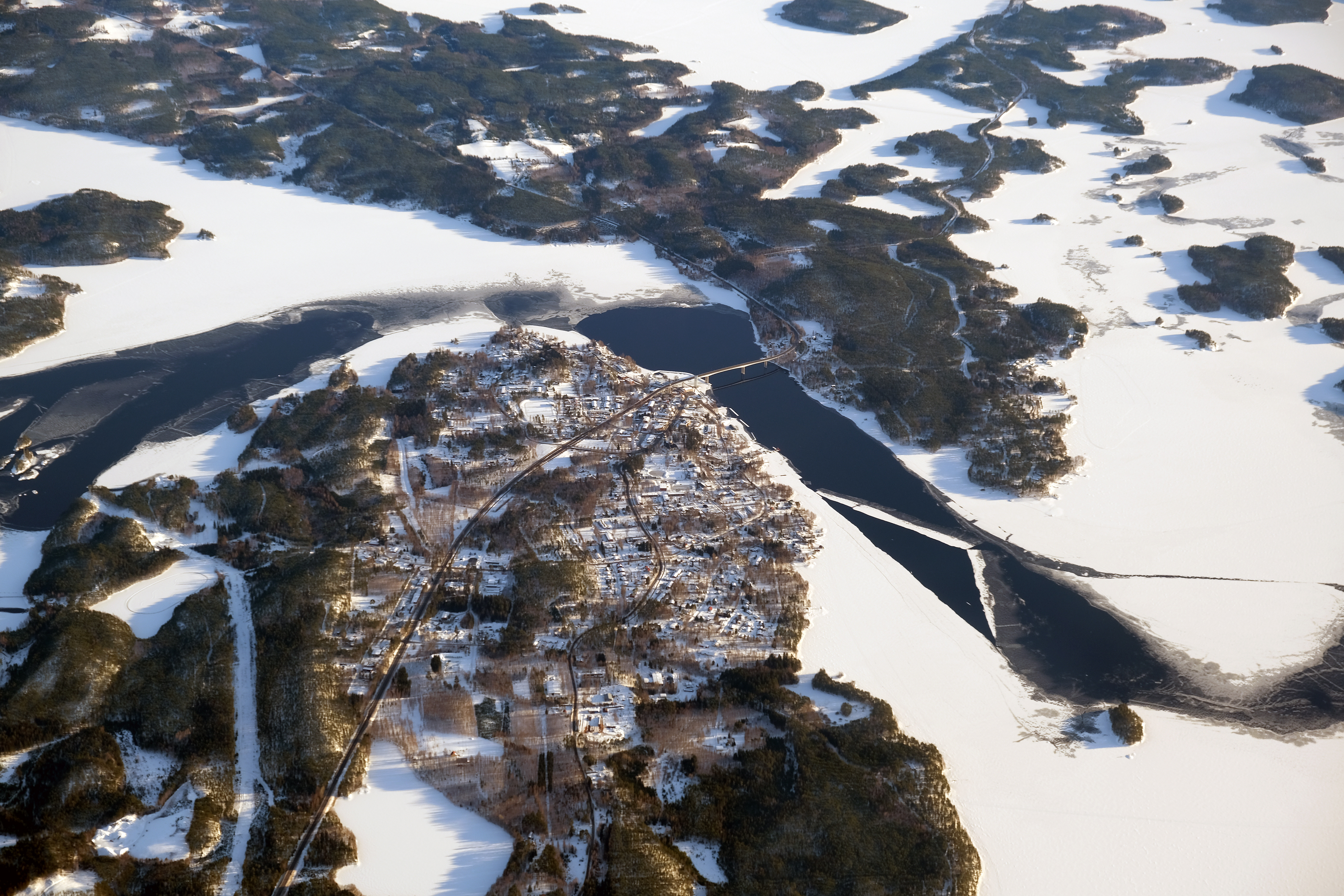

- Coat of arms
- Motto: Saimaan kaunein, Suomen kuumin. (English: The most beautiful in Saimaa, the hottest in Finland.)
- Location of Puumala in Finland
- Interactive map of Puumala
- Coordinates: 61°31.5′N 028°11′E
- Country: Finland
- Region: South Savo
- Sub-region: Mikkeli
- Charter: 1868

Government
  - Municipal manager: Matias Hildén

Area (2018-01-01)
  - Total: 1,237.75 km^{2} (477.90 sq mi)
  - Land: 794.11 km^{2} (306.61 sq mi)
  - Water: 443.17 km^{2} (171.11 sq mi)
  - Rank: 102nd largest in Finland

Population (2025-12-31)
  - Total: 2,081
  - Rank: 252nd largest in Finland
  - Density: 2.62/km^{2} (6.8/sq mi)

Population by native language
  - Finnish: 96.2% (official)
  - Others: 3.8%

Population by age
  - 0 to 14: 6.8%
  - 15 to 64: 49.2%
  - 65 or older: 44%
- Time zone: UTC+02:00 (EET)
  - Summer (DST): UTC+03:00 (EEST)
- Website: puumala.fi/en

Puumala (Finnish: [ˈpuːmɑlɑ]) is a municipality of Finland. It is located in the South Savo region. The municipality has a population of 2,081 (31 December 2025) and covers an area of 1,237.75 square kilometres (477.90 sq mi) of which 443.17 km^{2} (171.11 sq mi) is water. The population density is 2.62 inhabitants per square kilometre (6.8/sq mi).

The municipality is unilingually Finnish.

The main road route through the region is route 62, which connects to Mikkeli to the north and Imatra to the south. Until the year 1995 a cable ferry connected the two sides of Puumalansalmi-strait. In 1995, a 781-metre-long (2,562 ft) bridge replaced the ferry. The bridge is a very dominant structure when looking at Puumala town center from a distance.

Puumala has relatively good services compared to the amount of population. In the town center is situated a post office, an Alko store, a kiosk, several supermarkets and a few restaurants. The reason for the survival of these entrepreneurs is the arrival of summer inhabitants who triple the population of Puumala during the season.

In June 1788, Swedish soldiers wearing uniforms of the Imperial Russian Army, staged an attack against the town. This would allow King Gustav III to declare a defensive war against the Russian Empire, as Swedish law prohibited starting offensive wars without approval by the Riksdag.

The subject of Puumala's coat of arms refers to the local history: in the Treaty of Åbo in 1743, Puumala became a border parish, but due to its strategic location, the narrow Puumalansalmi has been the scene of several battles since the 16th century, which the flaming bombshells on the coat of arms refer to. The coat of arms was designed by Tapio Vallioja, and the Puumala municipal council approved it at its meeting on September 24, 1962. The Ministry of the Interior approved the coat of arms for use on April 18, 1963.

The Puumala virus is named after this place as it was first isolated from samples from the Puumala area.

== Gallery ==
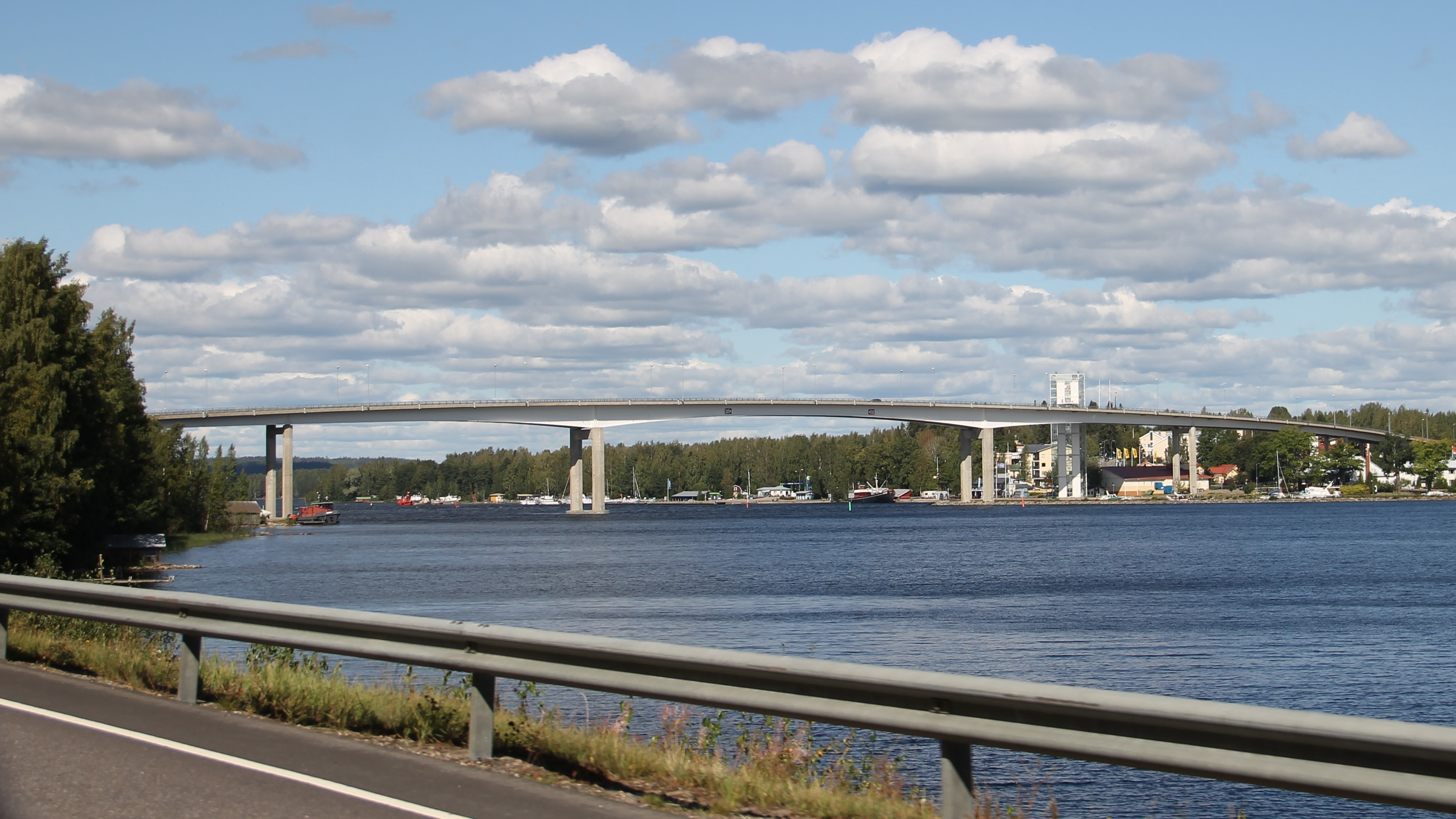

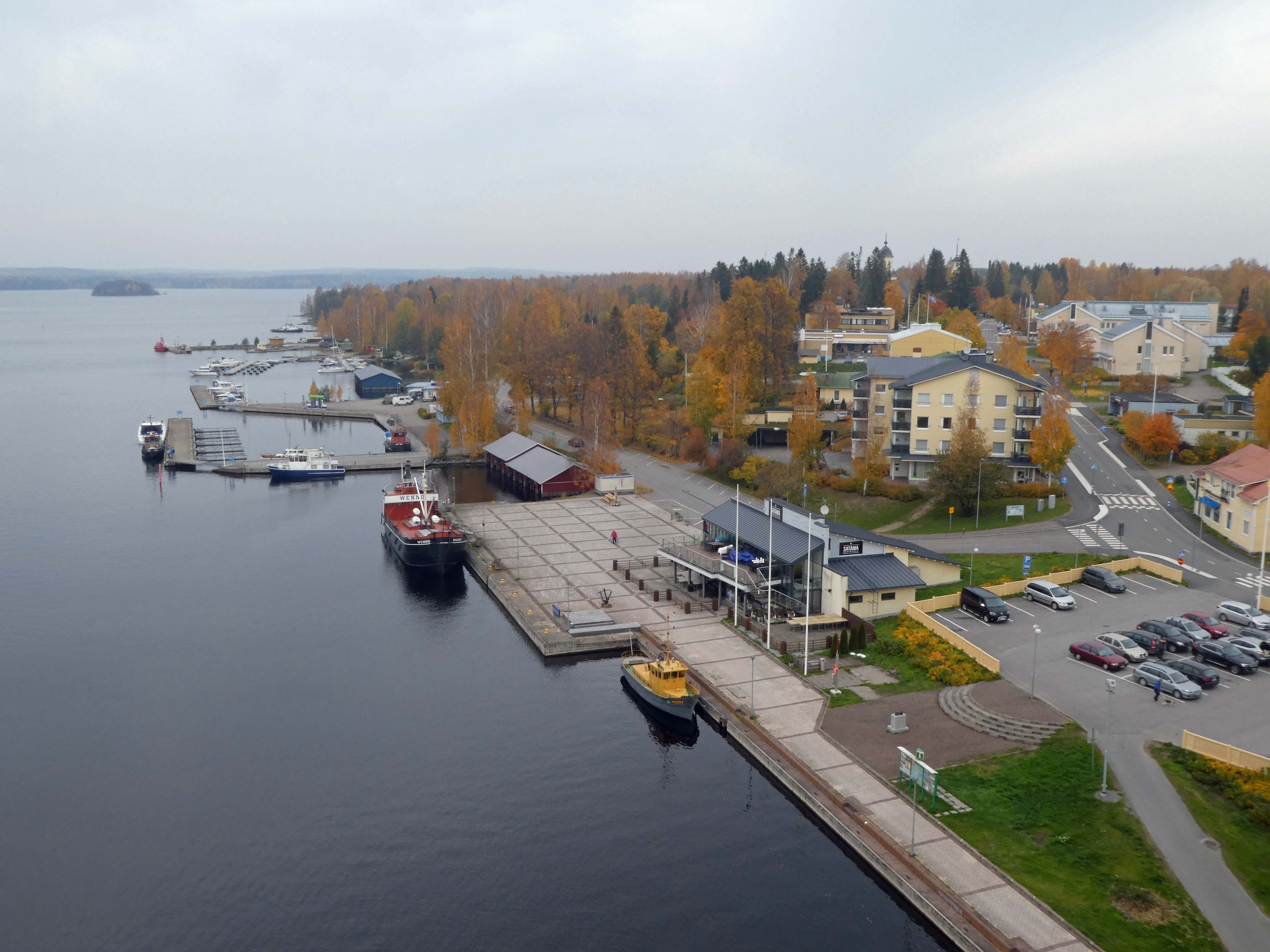

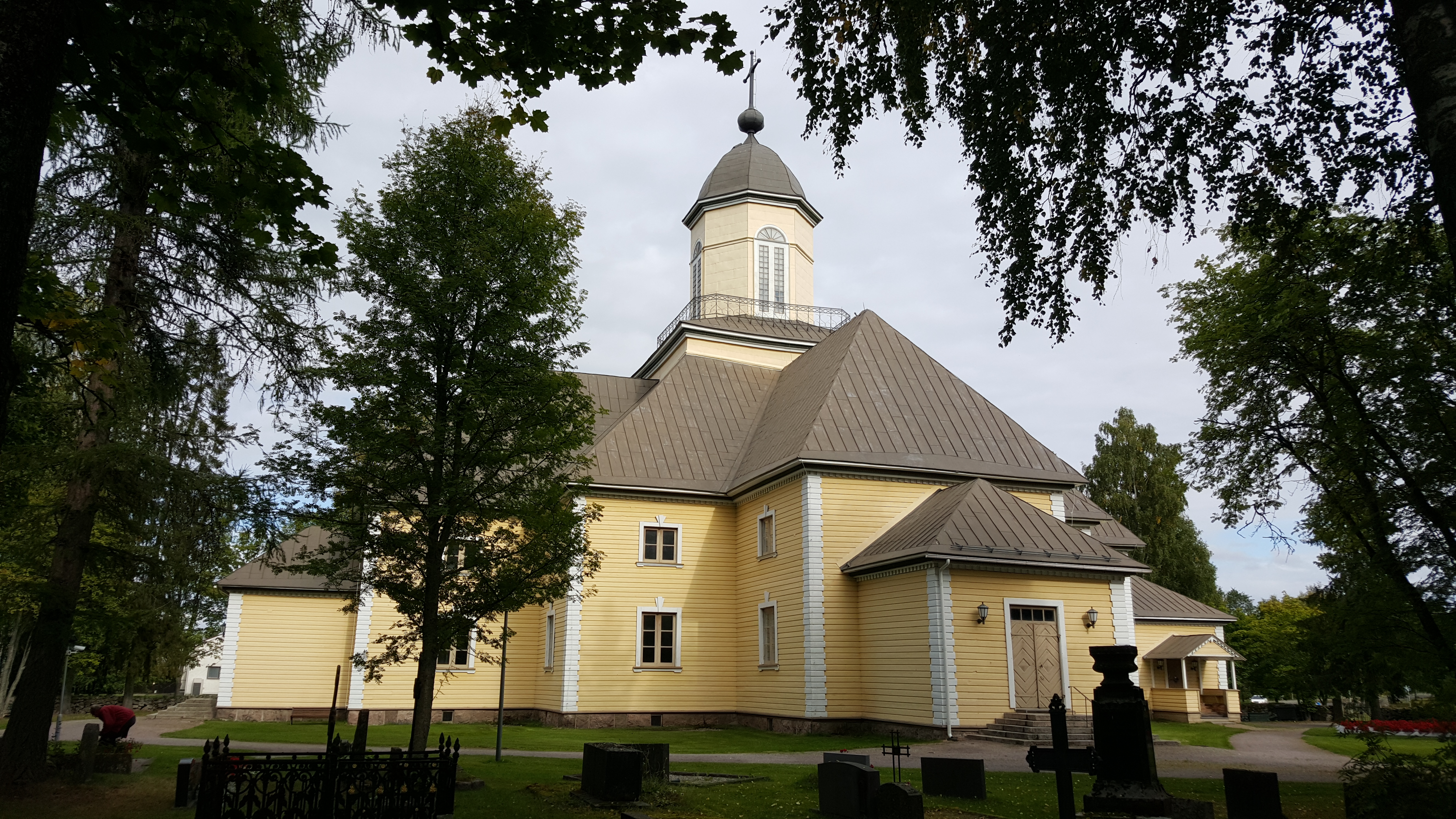

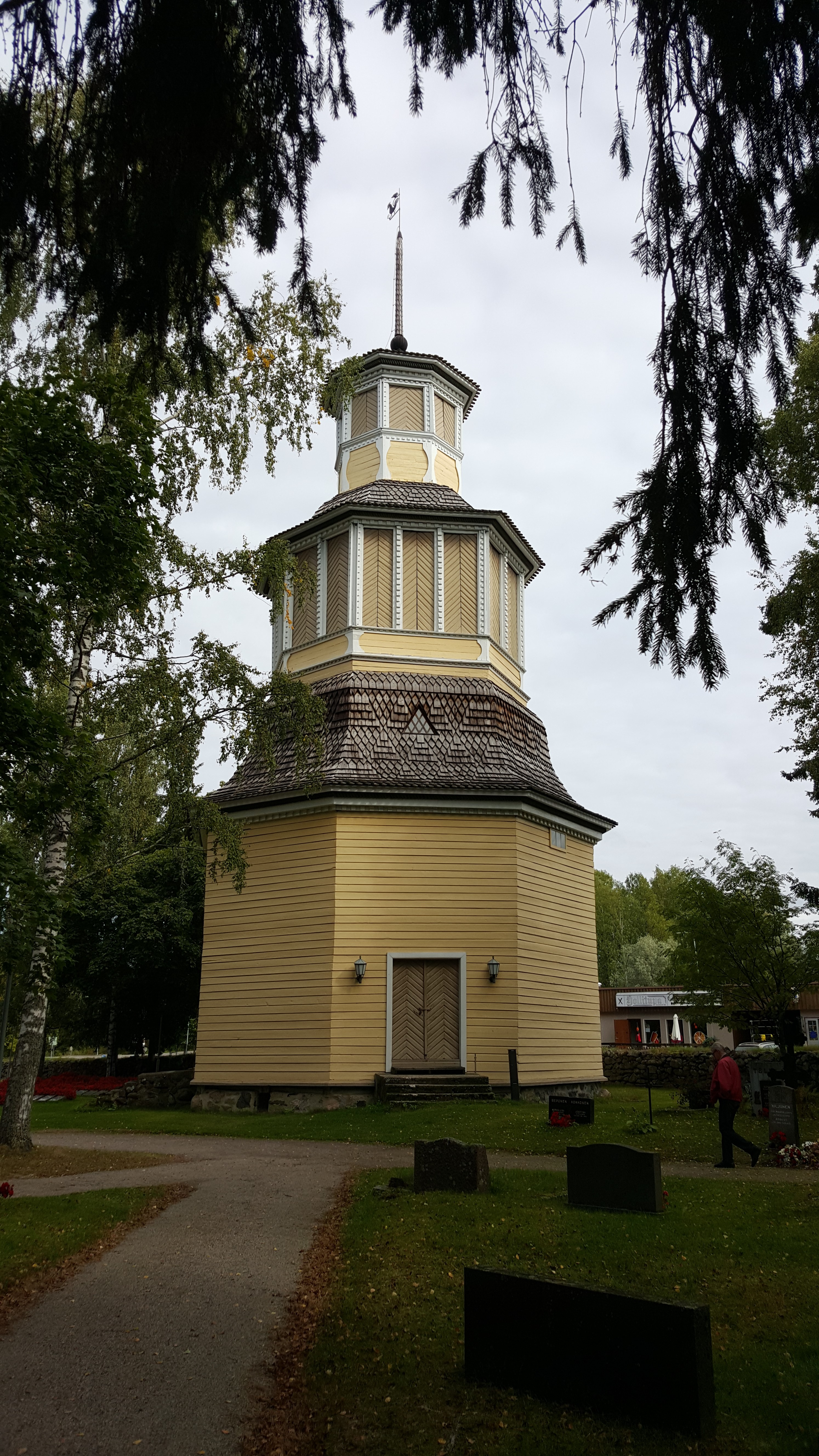
