= Puula =

Lake in Finland

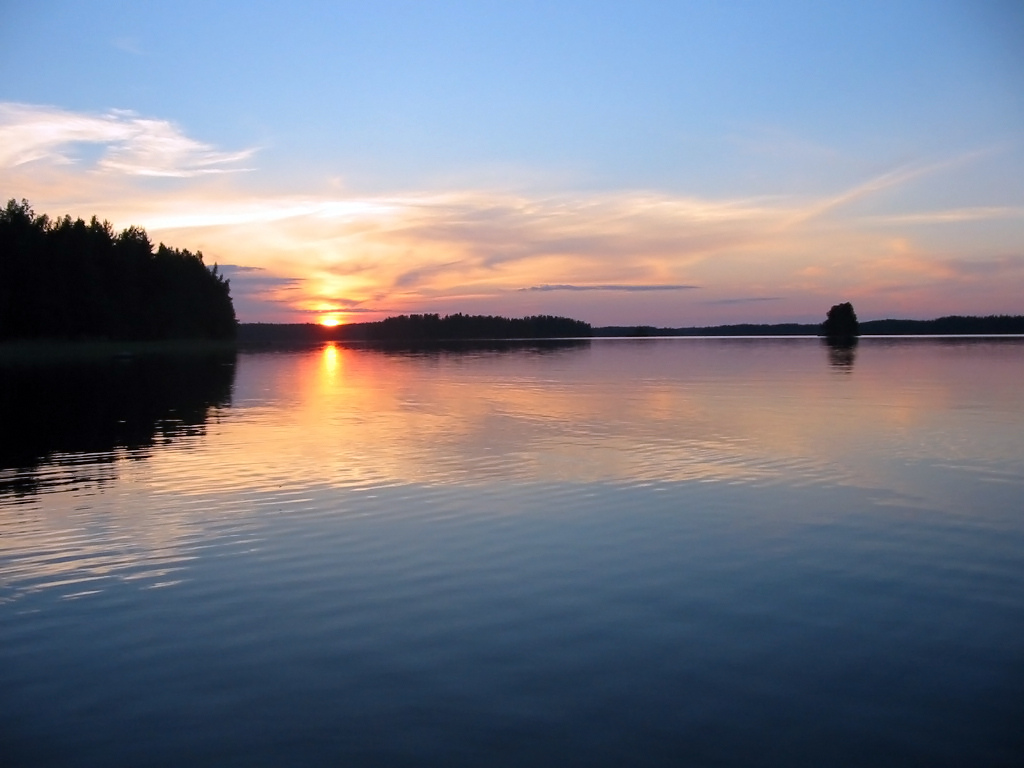
- Puula during a summer evening

- Location within Finland

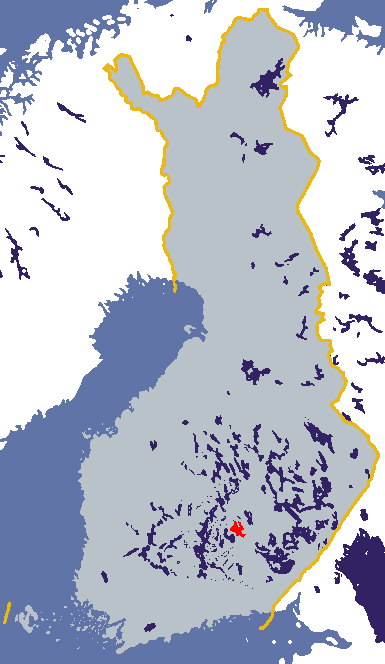
- Location: Southern Savonia, Finland
- Coordinates: 61°48′36″N 026°41′38″E
- Basin countries: Finland
- Surface area: 330.76 km^{2} (127.71 sq mi)
- Average depth: 9.2 m (30 ft)
- Max. depth: 62 m (203 ft)
- Surface elevation: 94.7 m (311 ft)
- Settlements: Hirvensalmi, Kangasniemi

Puula (or Puulavesi) is a lake in the Kymi River area in the Finnish municipalities of Hirvensalmi, Kangasniemi and Mikkeli. Puula is 94.7 metres (311 ft) above sea level, with a surface area of 331 square kilometres (128 sq mi). It is 62 metres (203 ft) deep at its deepest point, located near Porttisalmi at Simpiänselkä, which is the biggest open area of the lake. Two big lakes Suontee and Puula were one lake until year 1854, when the water level was lowered 2.5 meters. This brought geological stacks above the surface, which are formed by water.

Water from lake Puula runs down to Vahvajärvi through Kissakoski Canal.

Puula is known as a body of water with lake trout and lake salmon and it is therefore popular among trollers. The largest lake salmon in Finland in the 21st century, which weighed 12.4 kg, came from Puula. Multi-kilo trout are a typical catch from Puula.

== See also ==
- List of lakes in Finland
