= South Savo =

Region of Finland

South Savo Etelä-Savo (Finnish) Södra Savolax (Swedish)
- Region
- Region of South Savo; Etelä-Savon maakunta Landskapet Södra Savolax
- Flag Coat of arms

- South Savo on a map of Finland
- Coordinates: 62°0′N 27°30′E
- Country: Finland
- Historical province: Savo
- Capital: Mikkeli
- Other towns: Pieksämäki and Savonlinna

Government
  - Regional Mayor: Heini Utunen

Area
  - Total: 18,768.33 km^{2} (7,246.49 sq mi)

Population
  - Total: 128,144
  - Density: 10/km^{2} (26/sq mi)

GDP
  - Total: €4.414 billion (2015)
  - Per capita: €29,245 (2015)
- ISO 3166 code: FI-04
- NUTS: 131
- Regional bird: Golden oriole
- Regional fish: Vendace
- Regional flower: Water lily
- Regional stone: Marble
- Regional lake: Lake Puula
- Website: esavo.fi

South Savo (or Southern Savonia; Finnish: Etelä-Savo; Swedish: Södra Savolax) is a region in the south-east of Finland. It borders the regions of North Savo, North Karelia, South Karelia, Kymenlaakso, Päijät-Häme, and Central Finland. The total area of South Savo is 18,768.33 km^{2} (7,246.5 sq mi), with a population of 153,738 (2011). South Savo is located in the heart of the Finnish lake district, and contains Lake Saimaa, the largest lake in Finland. The three major towns in the region are Mikkeli, Savonlinna and Pieksämäki.

== Historical provinces ==
For history, geography and culture see: Savo

== History ==
South Savo was the main part of the old Mikkeli Province, established in 1831. Some municipalities were transferred from the county to Central Finland Province, which was established in 1960. Mikkeli Province was abolished in the province reform of 1997, when Regions were established. The province of South Savo belonged to the Eastern Finland Province. In 2002, Kangaslampi moved from the province of South Savo to the province of North Savo. Suomenniemi became part of Etelä-Savo in 2013 when it merged with Ristiina to form the city of Mikkeli. At the beginning of 2021, Joroinen moved to the province of North Savo and Heinävesi to the province of North Karelia as a result of provincial and social and health care reforms.

== Municipalities ==
The region of South Savo consists of 12 municipalities, three of which have city status (marked in bold).

=== Sub-regions ===
Mikkeli sub-region

- Hirvensalmi
- Kangasniemi
- **Mikkeli** (S:t Michel)
- Mäntyharju
- Puumala

Pieksämäki sub-region

- Juva
- **Pieksämäki**

Savonlinna sub-region

- Enonkoski
- Rantasalmi
- **Savonlinna** (Nyslott)
- Sulkava

=== List of municipalities ===
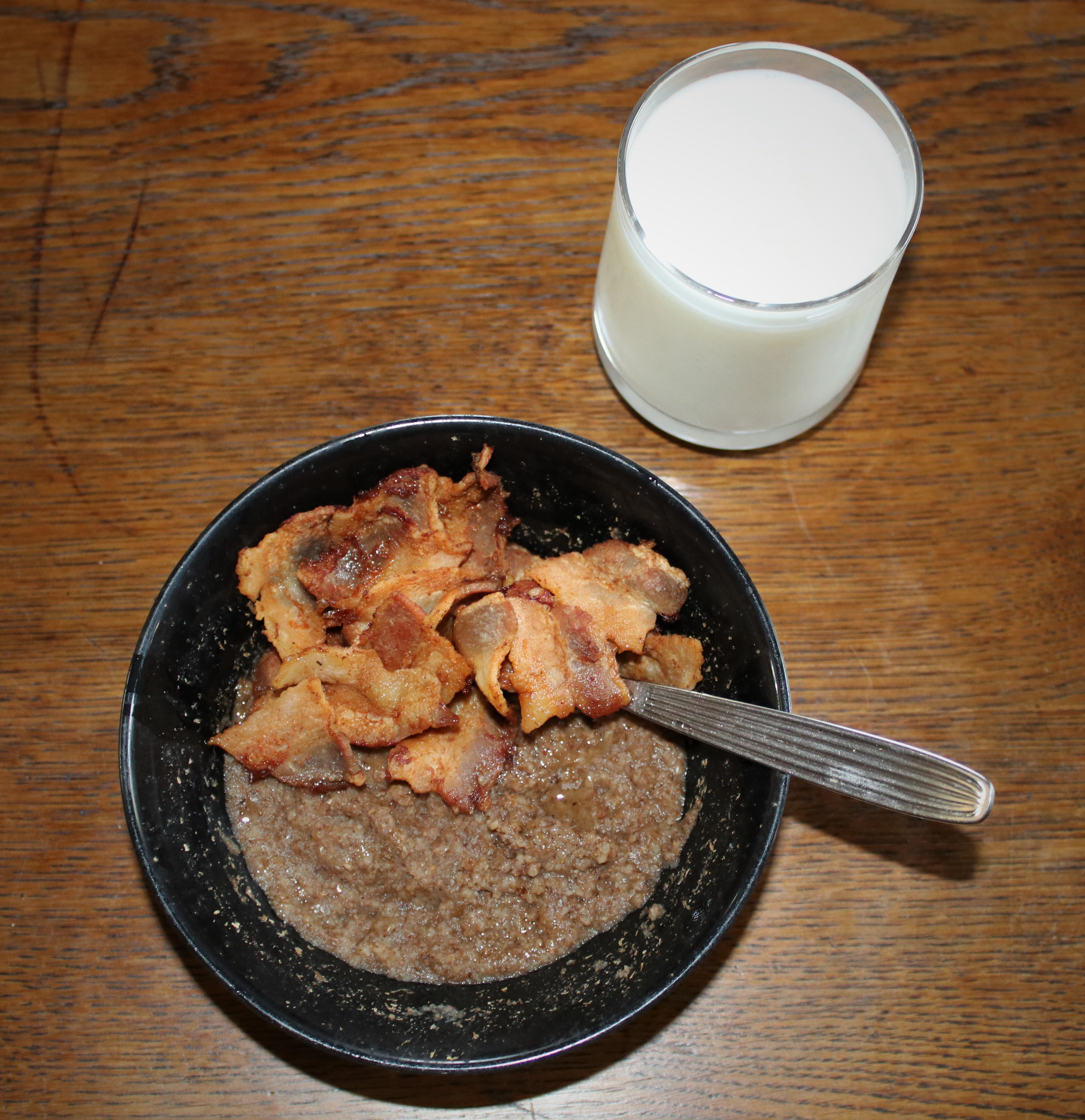
Talkkuna with Pork

Coat of arms	Municipality	Population	Land area (km^{2})	Density (/km^{2})	Finnish speakers	Swedish speakers	Other speakers
Coat of arms of Enonkoski	Enonkoski	1,273	306	4	96 %	0 %	4 %
coat of arms of Hirvensalmi	Hirvensalmi	2,023	465	4	96 %	0 %	3 %
Coat of arms of Juva	Juva	5,569	1,163	5	95 %	0.3 %	5 %
Coat of arms of Kangasniemi	Kangasniemi	4,952	1,069	5	96 %	0.2 %	4 %
coat of arms of Mikkeli	Mikkeli	51,551	2,548	20	93 %	0.2 %	7 %
Coat of arms of Mäntyharju	Mäntyharju	7,034	981	7	94 %	0.3 %	6 %
Coat of arms of Pieksämäki	Pieksämäki	17,124	1,569	11	92 %	0.1 %	8 %
Coat of arms of Puumala	Puumala	2,081	794	3	96 %	0 %	4 %
coat of arms of Rantasalmi	Rantasalmi	3,219	560	6	93 %	0 %	7 %
Coat of arms of Savonlinna	Savonlinna	31,008	2,238	14	94 %	0.1 %	6 %
Coat of arms of Sulkava	Sulkava	2,310	584	4	94 %	0 %	5 %
	Total	128,144	12,278	10	93 %	0.2 %	6 %

== Demographics ==
Population size 1990–2025
Year	Population
1990	163,462
1995	162,033
2000	156,117
2005	151,395
2010	146,166
2015	141,621
2020	132,702
2025	128,144

== Politics ==
For parliamentary elections, South Savo, together with the regions of Kymenlaakso and South Karelia, is part of the Southeast Finland constituency. The constituency elects 15 of the 200 members of the Parliament of Finland.

== Cuisine ==
The best known local cuisine is fried vendace, often served with potato puree, and a semicircle-shaped pastry called lörtsy.
