= Soviet partisans in Finland =

Soviet Union-Finland war (1941-1944)

Soviet partisan attacks in Finland
- Part of Continuation War during World War II
- Locations of the ambushes and villages raided by Soviet partisans
- Location: Eastern Finland
- Date: 13 July 1941 – 6 September 1944
- Target: Finnish civilians, military targets
- Deaths: 170 civilians killed, 20 missing and 54 wounded
- Perpetrator: NKVD long-range reconnaissance patrols

The Soviet partisans in Finland were an irregular military force which attacked Finnish military and civilian targets during the Continuation War, a sub-theater of World War II active between 1941 and 1944. They were based in East Karelia in the Soviet territory and conducted long-range penetration reconnaissance and raids inside Finnish borders, often attacking weak targets such as remote border villages or ambushing vehicles. Around 170 Finnish civilians were killed and 50 wounded in the raids.

== Partisan activity and raids ==
Around 2,400 Soviet partisans at most operated on the Karelian Front. They targeted enemy soldiers and officers, bridges, garrisons and railways. Unlike Soviet partisans elsewhere, they lacked continuously operating headquarters behind the enemy lines and often stayed there for just 15–20 days at a time. Their goals inside Finnish borders were to destroy military communications, disrupt economic activity of the Finnish population, and cause panic and uncertainty.

The partisans in Finland were controlled by organs of the Communist Party of the Soviet Union and the NKVD. The three most important people co-ordinating the partisan activity were the NKVD major general Sergey Vershinin, the First Secretary of the Karelo-Finnish Communist Party Gennady Kupriyanov, and the First Secretary of the Karelo-Finnish Komsomol Yuri Andropov, who later became the leader of the Soviet Union. Andropov's responsibility was to train the Karelian partisans. The headquarters were located in Belomorsk on the shore of the White Sea.

The three most prominent partisan groups were named Poljarnik, Bolshevik and Stalinets. Ten percent of the partisans in the groups were women. Besides the Soviet partisans, airborne reconnaissance troops and spies (Russian: desántnik) of the Soviet military also operated inside the Finnish borders.

The Finnish Army organized a special unit called Sau for anti-partisan activities. A partisan brigade was destroyed in Northern Karelia by the Finnish Army in mid-1942. Finnish preparations in the north of the country for partisan activity have later been criticized as lacking. The German military stationed in Lapland wanted to control the Finnish civilian population more strictly, conduct evacuations and issue German identification cards because they believed some civilians were giving information to the partisans, but the Finnish authorities rejected these plans. The Finnish Air Force also had too few resources to help with anti-partisan duties.

The partisans often presented highly falsified accounts of the raids inside the Finnish territory. Civilian villages were called military garrisons in the official reports. The raids on villages turned more brutal in mid-1944, when they were co-ordinated with the Soviet Vyborg–Petrozavodsk Offensive and incursions inside Finnish territory involved partisan detachments as large as 200 fighters during this time. In total, between 170 and 182 Finnish civilians died in the attacks, 50 were wounded and 20 went missing.

=== Seitajärvi massacre ===
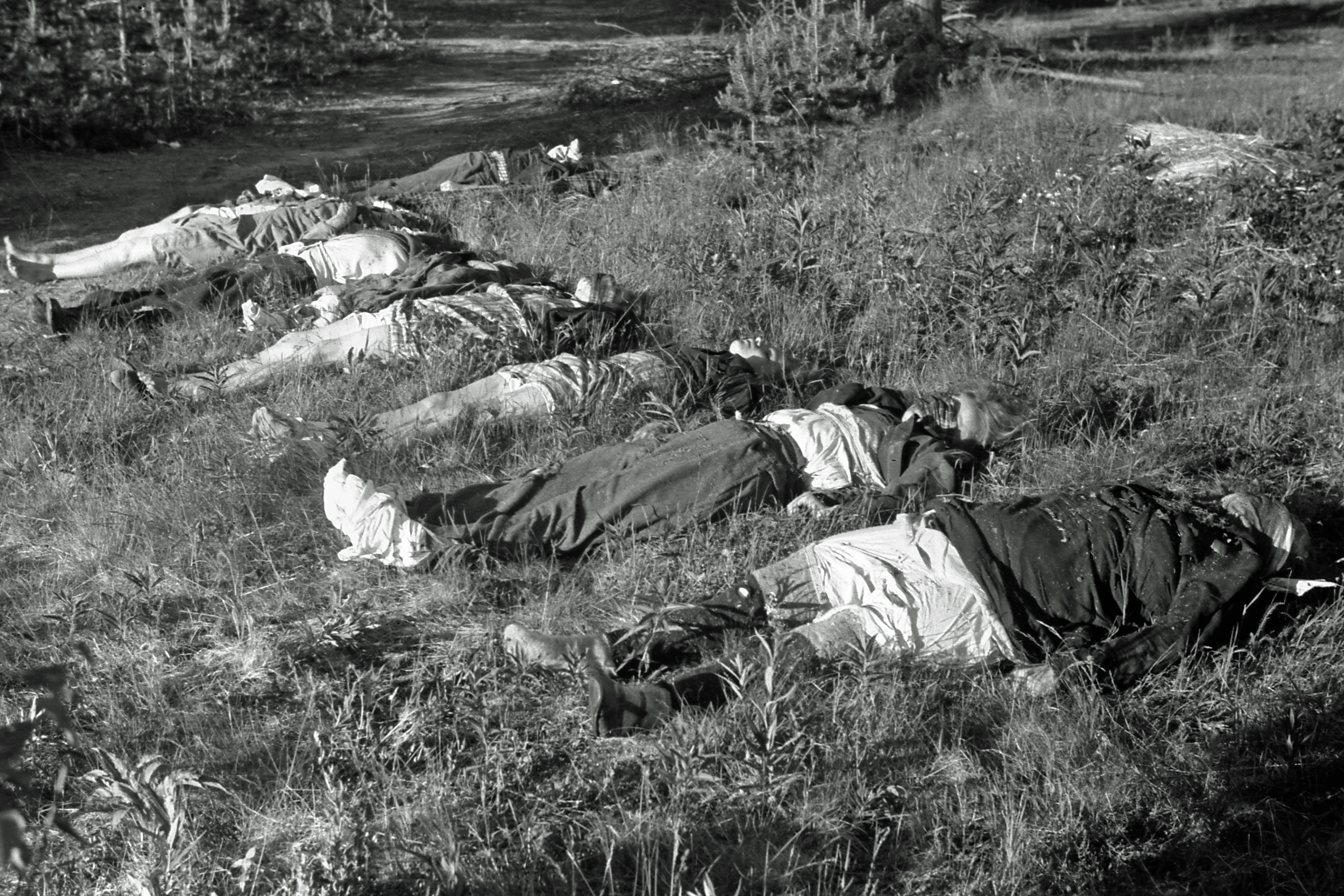
Finnish civilians killed in Seitajärvi on 7 July 1944

Forty-eight Soviet partisans attacked the village of Seitajärvi in the municipality of Savukoski at 3:00 a.m. on 7 July 1944. The village was protected by nine soldiers of the Finnish Army. Barking dogs awakened the villagers, but the Finnish soldiers, taken by surprise, were quickly overrun by the partisans. The latter lured the civilians to come out of hiding by promising that they would not be hurt, speaking to them in Finnish. Then the partisans took the civilians with them and set most of the buildings in the village on fire. The Finnish anti-partisan unit Sau arrived on the scene nine hours after the attack and found dead bodies with the help of search dogs in a nearby forest. The women and children who were taken as prisoners by the partisans had been killed by shooting and stabbing them with knives and bayonets. Some of the women had also been raped.

Fourteen civilians and two Finnish soldiers had been killed altogether. One eight-year-old girl who had been stabbed played dead and survived. The anti-partisan unit Sau kept tracking the partisans and found the trail of the troops. They fought until the morning and killed 33 partisans in total, but the main bulk of the partisans had managed to escape over the Kemijoki river. According to the official Soviet report which falsified information, the partisans destroyed a "Finnish garrison" and killed 94 men.

In the aftermath of the attack, a doctor from neutral Sweden was requested to perform autopsies on the victims. The administrative board of the Norrbotten County sent a doctor named Richard Lindgren to perform the task. Two Swedish newspapers, the Norrbottens-Kuriren and Norrländska Socialdemokraten, followed him to report on the attacks. The autopsies found that the civilians had been either shot in the head or neck. A five-year-old girl called Valma had been stabbed to the head with a knife and seven-month-old Ritva had died from blunt force trauma to the head. The rapes could not be unambiguously proven in the autopsies, as the bodies had already been washed and had also decomposed since it had been nine days since the attack happened. Based on physical marks on the bodies and the position of the bodies on the scene, it was concluded that rapes had happened and this was reported by the Norrländska Socialdemokraten.

=== Lokka massacre ===
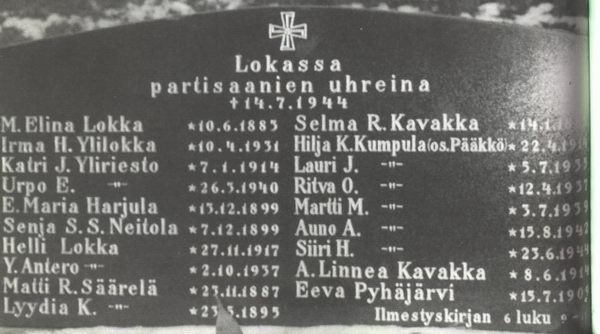
Memorial to the victims in Lokka

Twenty-one civilians were killed in the village of Lokka, Sodankylä, on 14 July 1944. The partisan group Stalinets attacked the village from three directions at 7:45 p.m. after one partisan had been caught nearby and fired at with a rifle by a Finnish civilian. The school building where the civilians were hiding was then set on fire by the partisans. The partisans shot at people who tried to help them escape the burning structure through a window. Hilja Kumpula and five of her children perished in the fire, the youngest of whom was a one-month-old baby. The detachment managed to escape unharmed before units of the Finnish Army could reach them. Gennady Kupriyanov, who was leading the partisan activity, claimed in his report that the village was a "heavily fortified garrison". In reality, the NKVD had accurate intelligence on the village and the partisans had been monitoring it for days, knowing it had no combatants.

== Legacy ==
The partisan attacks were not a widely-known topic in Finland until the 1990s. This was in part due to the official Finnish position of friendly relations with the Soviet Union after the war, which even made them a sort of “forbidden topic”, and some publishers avoided books about it. This changed when journalist and author Veikko Erkkilä published his book Vaiettu sota (transl. The Untold War) in 1998. Public awareness and debate ensued and Erkkilä was given a state award for an information publication (Finnish: Tiedonjulkistamisen valtionpalkinto) by the Finnish Government.

In Russia, the Soviet partisans in Finland are held in high regard as heroes of the Great Patriotic War.

A conference of reconciliation was held in Sodankylä in September 2002. It was attended by 150 people, including Finnish and Russian researchers, victims of the partisan attacks and two Soviet partisan veterans. The former Under-Secretary-General of the United Nations Elisabeth Rehn acted as patroness for the conference. There, the long-standing silence on the raids and also the war-time response of the Finnish authorities were criticized.

=== Criminal investigation ===
Olavi Alakulppi, a captain in the Finnish Army who witnessed the aftermath of the Seitajärvi raid, tried to influence a United Nations commission to investigate the Soviet partisan attacks in Finland as a war crime. He served in the United States Army after the war and during his stay in the United States he submitted evidence and a formal testimony about the partisans, including photos of the victims and reports from Swedish newspapers about the attacks. In 1960, the Soviet envoy to the United Nations strongly denied that they had committed crimes against civilian population and even questioned whether Alakulppi had actually served in the Finnish Army. The Finnish UN permanent representative Ralph Enckell refused to take a stance on the issue and the case was not pursued further.

In October 1998, Christian Democratic MP Päivi Räsänen submitted a parliamentary question asking the government how they would investigate the partisan war crimes and bring the perpetrators to justice. The question was answered by the Minister for Foreign Affairs Tarja Halonen who stated that the investigation would require co-operation from Russia.

After the parliamentary inquiry, the office of the Prosecutor General of Finland decided to review the issue, as murder does not expire under the Finnish law. They concluded that the partisan attacks should be investigated as murders, but that the case should not be pursued by the Prosecutor General, and instead referred the investigation to the National Bureau of Investigation. Finland and Russia only had a treaty on general cooperation on legal matters, not a treaty on extradition, so in case of charges extraditions would have had to happen based on Russian court orders.

In 2003, Russia informed Finnish authorities that the alleged crimes had expired under the 1926 Soviet criminal code, which ruled that murder expires in ten years, and that they would not provide further information from the archives. The National Bureau of Investigation dropped the case after this.

=== Victim compensation ===
The Finnish Parliament approved legislation which granted a sum of 1,500 euro for the victims of the partisan attacks in September 2003. The compensation was granted to people whose illness had been caused by a partisan attack, including emotional distress, or if they had lost one or both parents. It was estimated that there were 600–700 Finns eligible for the compensation. Previously only physical injuries were compensated.

== Declassification of victim pictures ==
In November 2006, the Finnish Defence Forces declassified slightly over 300 war-time pictures that had been considered “politically delicate” or too brutal for a broad audience. Dozens of them were related to the Soviet partisan raids. These included pictures of villages burned by the partisans, bodies of the victims, including children, and old men being armed with rifles to defend their villages. Previously only researchers or relatives of the victims could access these pictures with a special permission. The declassified pictures were widely discussed in the Finnish media.

Examples of formerly classified photos of the partisan raids
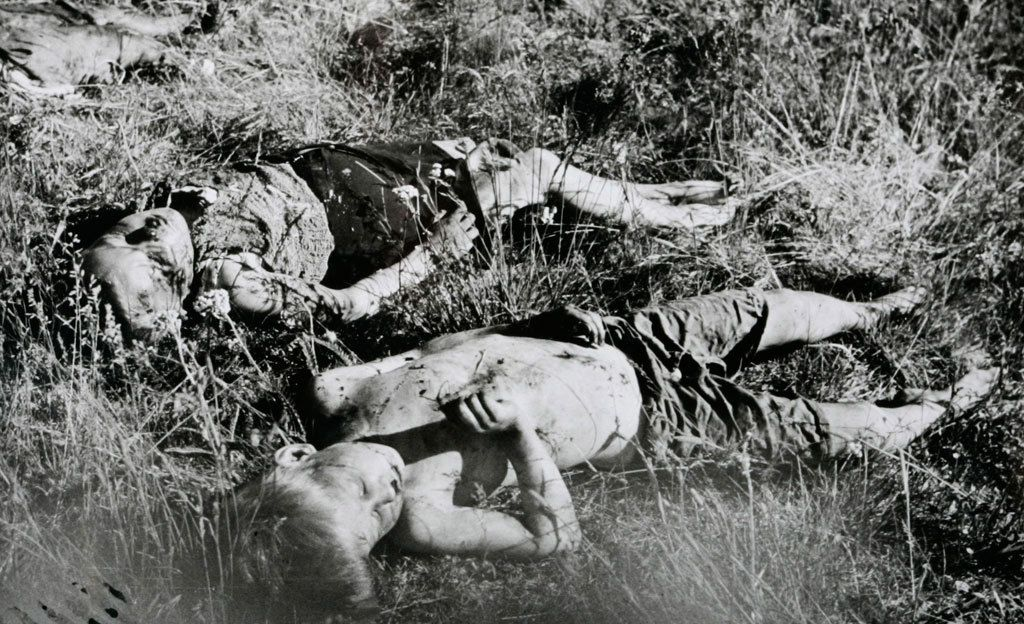
Two Finnish boys killed by partisans in Seitajärvi

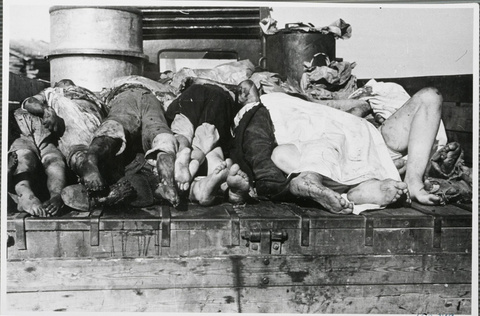
Civilians of the Lokka village killed on July 14 1944 being transported to the graveyard.

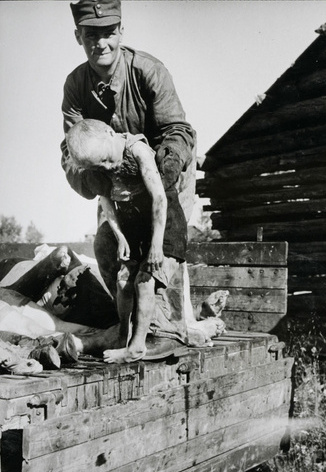
A Finnish soldier on a lorry bed carrying the body of a boy killed by partisans in Lokka on 14 July 1944

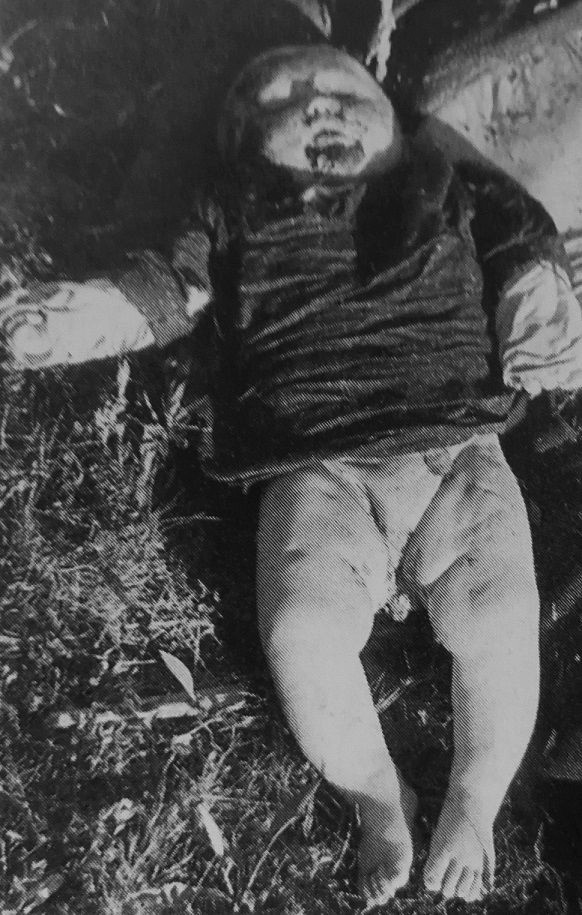
The youngest victim of the 7 July 1944 raid on Seitajärvi, a seven-month-old baby named Ritva. Her head had been hit with a gun-stock.

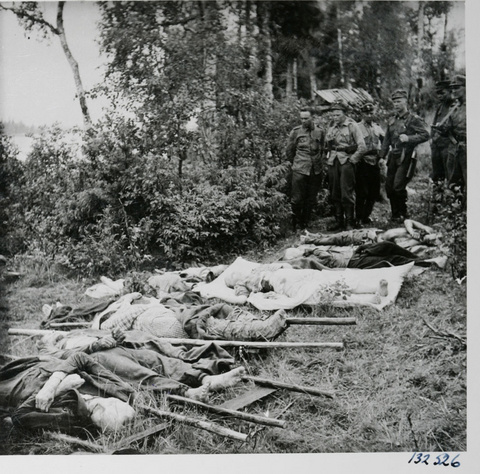
Dead civilians in Suomussalmi on 7 July 1943.

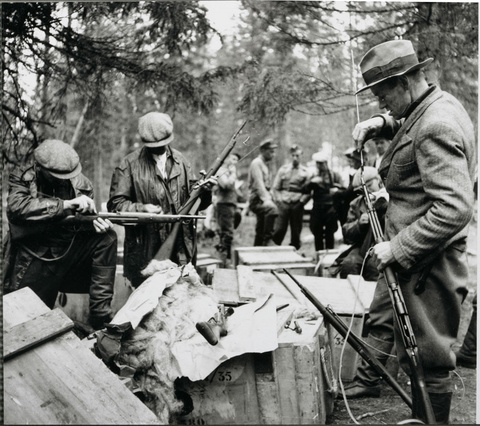
Elderly men being issued rifles to defend their homes from the partisans in Suomussalmi in 1943

== List of villages raided by the partisans ==
The following is a list of villages raided by the Soviet partisans in alphabetical order.

- Hautajärvi, Salla 15 July 1943
- Hirvivaara, Kuhmo 24 July 1944
- Hyry, Suomussalmi 26 June 1943
- Kemi ferry 3 September 1941
- Kivivaara, Pielisjärvi 13 July 1941
- Kontiovaara, Lieksa 30 July 1944
- Korpivaara, Liperi 7 August 1944
- Kuoliovaara, Kuusamo 5 July 1942
- Kuorajärvi, Lieksa 30 July 1944
- Kuosku, Savukoski 3 September 1941
- Kurkivaara, Kuhmo 9 July 1942
- Kuumu, Kuhmo 9 July 1942
- Levävaara, Kuhmo
- Lokka, Sodankylä 14 July 1944
- Louhivaara, Inari 6 September 1944
- Lämsänkylä, Kuusamo 18 July 1943
- Malahvia, Suomussalmi 4 July 1943
- Murtovaara, Kuusamo 5 July 1942
- Niemelä, Salla 18 July 1943
- Nousunkylä, Savukoski 21 June 1944
- Piilo house, Pielisjärvi 5 August 1944
- Pirttivaara, Suomussalmi 1 August 1944
- Saija, Salla 21 June 1944
- Seitajärvi, Savukoski 7 July 1944
- Sormivaara, Pielisjärvi 30 July 1941
- Suorajärvi, Kuusamo 11 July 1942
- Tuppuri, Suomussalmi 26 June 1943
- Viianki, Suomussalmi 4 July 1943
- Viiksimo, Kuhmo 24 September 1942
- Yliluiro, Sodankylä 19 August 1943
- Ylivuokki, Suomussalmi 6 July 1943

== See also ==
- Soviet partisans in Estonia
- Military history of Finland during World War II
- Finland–Russia border
