= Markus Rautio =

Finnish radio journalist and presenter (1891–1973)

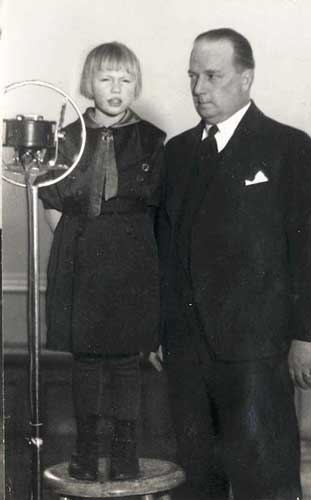
- Markus Rautio (right) with Hilkka Rissanen (left) in 1936
- Born: Eino Markus Rautio; 17 May 1891; Helsinki, Grand Duchy of Finland, Russian Empire
- Died: 14 February 1973 (aged 81); Helsinki, Finland
- Resting place: Hietaniemi Cemetery
- Presenting career
- Show: Markus-sedän lastentunti
- Station: National Radio of Finland

Eino Markus Rautio (17 May 1891 – 14 February 1973), also known as Uncle Markus (Finnish: Markus-setä), was a Finnish radio journalist and presenter.

Between 1926 and 1956 he presented the children's radio show Children's Hour with Uncle Markus (Finnish: Markus-sedän lastentunti) on the National Radio of Finland.

On his show he said Father Christmas (Finnish: Joulupukki) lived in Lapland on Korvatunturi, on the basis that this was where he could hear everything to find out who was naughty and nice. The theme was later taken up by Mauri Kunnas in his books on Christmas, wherein Santa Claus lives in a remote village on the side of the Hill, with his elves and reindeer.

In 1958, Rautio received the recognition award of the Finnish Cultural Foundation, and in 1967, he was awarded the honorary title of Teatterineuvos (lit. 'Theatre Counselor').

Rautio was buried in Hietaniemi Cemetery.
