= Santa Claus and His Elves =

1981 Finnish book about Joulupukki by Mauri Kunnas

- Cover of an early English edition
- Author: Mauri and Tarja Kunnas
- Original title: Joulupukki
- Illustrator: Mauri Kunnas
- Language: English
- Subject: Christmas in Finland
- Genre: Picture book
- Set in: Korvatunturi
- Publisher: Otava, Crown Publishers
- Publication date: 1981
- English publication date: 1982
- ISBN: 978-0517558188

Santa Claus and His Elves (Finnish: Joulupukki ) is an illustrated children's book by Finnish author Mauri Kunnas and his wife Tarja Kunnas. The book tells a story about a year in the life of Joulupukki, a Finnish Christmas figure associated with Santa Claus, in Korvatunturi. Published in Finnish in 1981, the book was first released in English in the United States in 1982. The English version maintains the visuals of its Finnish setting but adapts the language to describe Santa Claus and his mythical workshop at the North Pole. The book has been translated into nearly 30 languages and has sold more than two million copies worldwide, remaining in print in Finland and other countries.

== Plot summary ==
The book begins with a description of Santa's village, set in the mountainous region of Korvatunturi, although the setting is described in the English edition as the North Pole. A wandering Sámi, described anatopically as an "Eskimo", is pictured stumbling on the village. Santa's village is populated by Santa and Mrs. Claus as well as a wide variety of elves. The book proceeds to describe a day in the life at the North Pole, including breakfast, sleeping arrangements, school for elf children, summer recreation and reindeer herding. The story then shifts to autumn, when preparations for Christmas ramp up with toy production, printing of books and games, and storage of finished products. In November, elf spies are sent out to report on whether children have been good, and elf clerks record Christmas wish lists from children by country. The elves engage in a massive effort to wrap all the presents, then load airplanes and sleighs for delivery over the 24 hours of Christmas Eve. When Santa and the elves return, they relax in a sauna, celebrate their own Christmas at the North Pole, then take time off before beginning the preparations for the following year.

== Publication history ==
Joulupukki was Kunnas's third book when it was published in Finland in 1981. Kunnas's wife, Tarja, who principally served as a colorist, was credited as coauthor.

The book became a major success, with the Finnish version of the book in its seventh edition as of 2023. It was published in the United States in English in 1982. By 2021, after 40 years in print, the book had been translated into nearly 30 languages, and sold more than two million copies across 28 countries. It is Kunnas's best-selling book.

Joulupukki was the first of several Christmas-themed books and related products that Kunnas created. Work that followed from Joulupukki included Santa Claus and the Magic Drum, a book on how Santa spends the rest of his holidays, as well as other Christmas-themed books and Finnish postage stamps.

== Reception ==
The Boston Phoenix described the book as "an up-to-date, complete Santa story" and praised its "outstanding pictures". The reviewer praised the details of the book's Arctic setting and highlighted practical notes such as Santa's rubbing on liniment and taking a post-Christmas Eve sauna.

In addition to selling well in Finland, the book was particularly popular in Germany and Japan.
