= Aholanvaara =

Hamlet in Lapland, Finland

Coordinates: 66.534°N 28.705°E

Aholanvaara is a small hamlet in Salla municipality, Lapland, Finland. It is located near the Russian border, 60.6 kilometers from Salla town, 5.5 kilometers from Hirvasvaara, 16.7 kilometers from Hautajärvi, 84.6 kilometers from Kuusamo, 62.6 kilometers away from Rukatunturi. It has a population of approximately 60 people and was founded in the early 1850s
