= Loitsana =

Lake in Savukoski, Finland

- Location within Finland
- Coordinates: 67°48′17″N 29°16′56″E
- Basin countries: Finland
- Surface area: 0.9 km^{2} (0.35 sq mi)

Loitsana is a lake in Savukoski, Finland. The lake is fed by groundwater inflow from the closest esker and from a small stream from northwest. It drains into Soklioja rivulet, which is part of the Nuortti river drainage basin.

Loitsana was developed from the Sokli ice lake, which deglaciated sometime prior to 10 700 cal. a BP. There are multiple Stone Age dwelling sites along its coast. Among these is the Malmio 1 site, which has been dated to approximately 8070 BC, making it the second oldest known archaeological site in Lapland.
