= Kuoloyarvi =

Kuoloyarvi Куолоярви Kuolajärvi (Finnish)
- Inhabited locality
- Interactive map of Kuoloyarvi
- Location of Kuoloyarvi Kuoloyarvi (Murmansk Oblast)
- Coordinates: 66°58′23″N 29°15′15″E
- Country: Russia
- Federal subject: Murmansk Oblast
- Administrative district: Kandalakshsky District
- Territorial OkrugSelsoviet: Alakurttinsky Territorial Okrug
- Elevation: 191 m (627 ft)

Population (2010 Census)
  - Total: 0
  - Estimate (2021): 0 )

Municipal status
  - Municipal district: Kandalakshsky Municipal District
  - Rural settlement: Alakurtti Rural Settlement
- Time zone: UTC+3 (MSK)
- Postal code: 184020
- Dialing code: +7 81533
- OKTMO ID: 47608403111

Kuoloyarvi (Russian: Куолоярви, Finnish: Kuolajärvi) is a rural locality (an inhabited locality) in Kandalakshsky District of Murmansk Oblast, Russia, located north of the Arctic Circle at an altitude of 191 meters (627 ft) above sea level. It had no recorded population as of the 2010 Census.

== History ==
Kuoloyarvi used to be part of Finland as a former town called Kuolajärvi then renamed as Salla after the Municipality of Salla when the name of the municipality of Kuolajärvi was changed into Salla in 1936. The name Kuolajärvi had been originally given to the parish and the municipality and the municipal centre after the big rural village of Kuolajärvi (now Kayraly, from Russian: Кайралы, romanized: Kayraly, from Finnish: Kairala, that was a smaller part of the same settlement) that was located further east by a lake with the same name (Russian: Куолаярви, romanized: Kuolayarvi, Finnish: Kuolajärvi) . During the Winter War, the Battle of Salla happened in this former town. It was captured by Soviet forces on December 9, 1939. To counterattack the Soviets, the Finnish Air Force bombed Salla three days later.

However, after the Winter War, Salla was annexed into the Soviet Union, then being renamed into Kuoloyarvi, which was similar to the old name. The people who previously lived in this town had been evacuated by the Finnish government.
