= Karhunkierros =

Hiking trail in Finland

Coordinates: 66.163°N 29.124°E

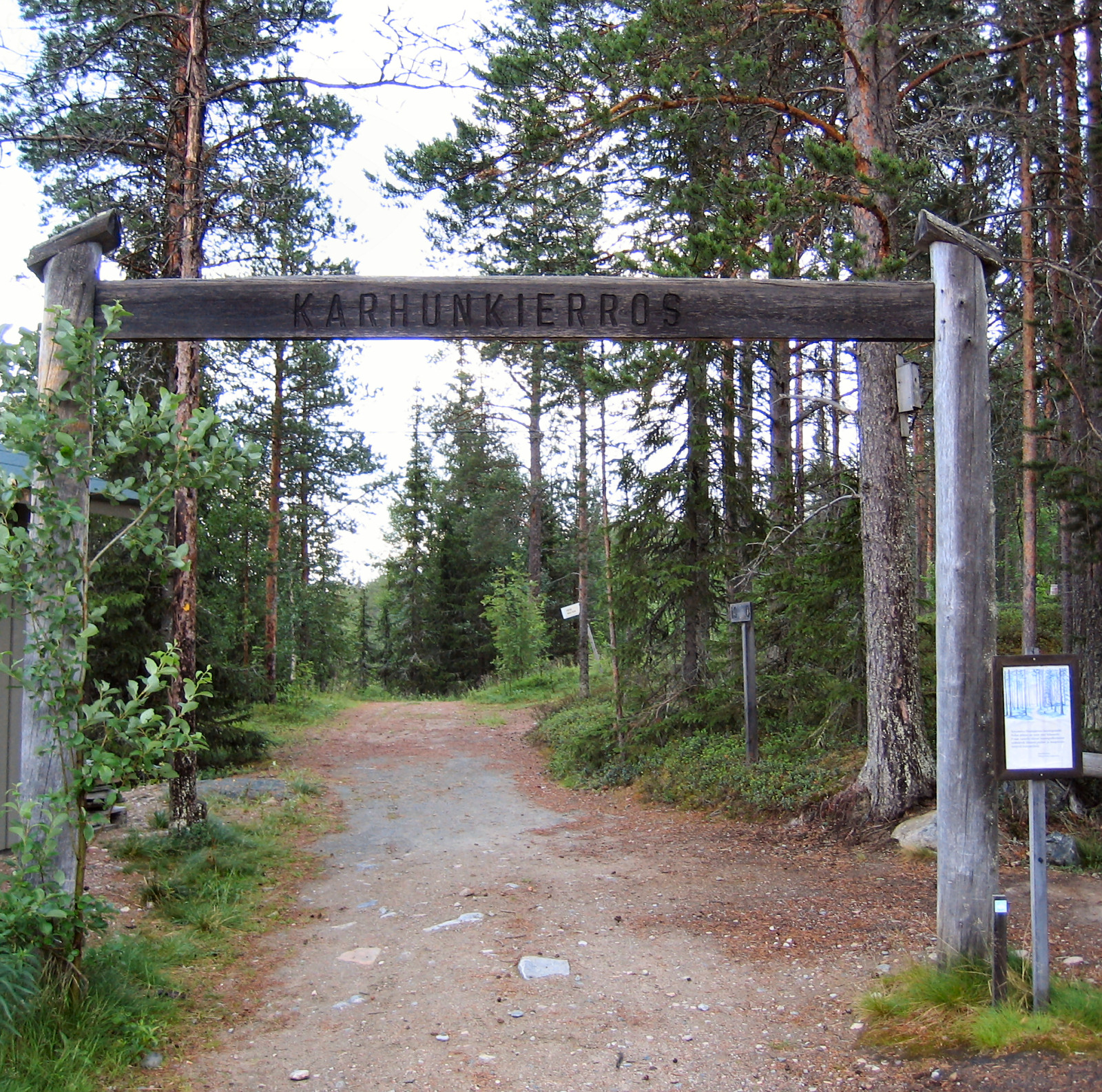
The Hautajärvi starting point of the Karhunkierros trail.

Karhunkierros (Finnish for Bear's Round) is a hiking trail that stretches from Salla to Kuusamo in north-eastern Finland.

The route was first marked in 1955, and has since become the most popular hiking trail in Finland, attracting some 15,000 hikers every year, mainly over the high season lasting from mid-July to late September. The trail is approximately 80 kilometres (50 mi) long, and runs for the most of its length within the Oulanka National Park.

== Route ==
The trail has two main starting points. The paths starting at Hautajärvi and at Ristikallio converge at Taivalköngäs, from where the trail continues along the Oulanka and Kitka rivers towards Rukatunturi fell. Starting from Hautajärvi makes the total length of the trail 80 km, while the Ristikallio variant is some 9 km shorter. The route is marked with orange paint markings in trees and rocks.

It is also perfectly possible to hike the route in the opposite direction, starting from Rukatunturi, but most people prefer the aforementioned ways.

Also of note is the Pieni Karhunkierros, or Little Bear's Round, a circular day trip trail of 12 km (7.5 mi) that partly shares the route of Karhunkierros proper.

== Accommodation ==
Along the trail there are eight wilderness huts that are open and free to use for every visitor to spend a night in, plus two day trip huts for shorter breaks. In addition there are several campfire sites and lean-to shelters, and a more fully equipped camping ground. Camping near huts and outside the designated areas is mainly permitted under Everyman's right.
