= Mauri Kunnas =

Finnish cartoonist and children's author (born 1950)

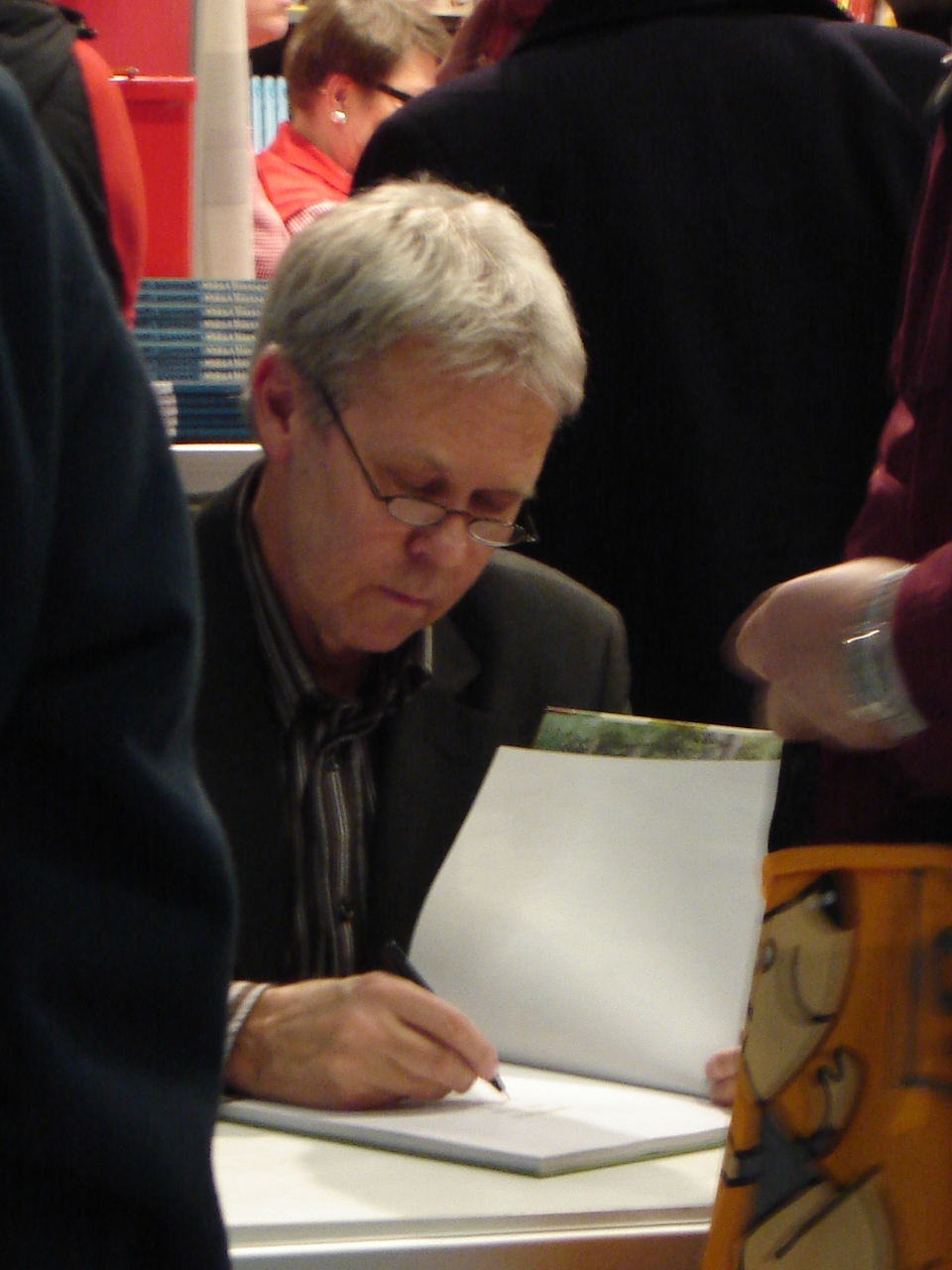
Mauri Kunnas in 2008

Mauri Tapio Kunnas (born 11 February 1950) is a Finnish cartoonist and children's author.

== Biography ==
Santa Claus and His Elves (Advent calendar)

Kunnas was born in Vammala, in the former municipality of Tyrvää. He is the son of Martti Kunnas and Martta Lastunen. He graduated from Vammala High School in 1969 and from the University of Art and Design in Helsinki as a graphic designer in 1975. He has worked as a political cartoonist in many Finnish newspapers, including for Aamulehti (from 1975), Turun Sanomat (from 1976), Suomen Kuvalehti (from 1977), and Helsingin Sanomat (from 1983), as well as the magazine Suosikki (from 1975). He lives in Espoo with his wife Tarja (née Junnila), whom he married in 1978, and two children.

Kunnas is most famous for his numerous children's books, illustrated by himself and featuring anthropomorphic animals. His early work includes a 1978 collection of cartoons, Jauhot suuhun, and a 1978 television play, Tontut. His first major children's book was Suomalainen tonttukirja (1979). His most famous children's book series is called Koiramäki (Dog Hill), set in historical Finland, featuring anthropomorphic dogs; the first books in the series were Koiramäen talossa (1980), which was also adapted into a play, and Koiramäen lapset kaupungissa (1982). His other works include Riku, Roope ja Ringo (Ricky, Rocky and Ringo), some "horror" books and books about Joulupukki, including Santa Claus and His Elves, his best-selling work.

The hordes of clothed animals present in his books by the end of the 1970s led people to compare him to Richard Scarry, but as he became more popular and produced even more work the similarities lessened. Kunnas' children's books usually feature some recurring background characters, like Herra Hakkarainen (Mr. Clutterbuck), a sleepwalking goat.

Aside of children's books, Kunnas has also drawn a rock and roll parody comic called Nyrok City for teenagers and adults. The comic parodies 1970s-1980s era rock and roll culture such as The Beatles and The Rolling Stones in a Finnish style. It is one of the few Kunnas works in which the characters are drawn as humans.

Much of the scenic imagery in his work comes from his hometown of Vammala with glimpses of its churches and rustic atmosphere. He also did valuable PR work for the Finnish home of Santa Claus in Twelve Gifts for Santa Claus (USA 1988), and Santa and the Magic Drum (Otava 1996), the latter of which has also been made into an animated film of the same name in the same year.

In 1992, he worked on a grander scale with The Canine Kalevala, a new version of the classic Finnish epic more accessible to children, as well as a cultural sidestep in his 1997 version of The Knights of King Arthur featuring cats in Camelot. He followed that up with more tales from the Kalevala in 2021 with Who Seized the sun.

He attributes a large part of his success to his good wife Tarja Kunnas who has worked for twenty years as his assistant doing the painting for her husband's drawings.

== Awards ==
Kunnas received the Finnish State Prize for Youth Literature in 1981. Kunnas received the Pro Finlandia medal in 2002. He was shortlisted for the Finlandia Prize in the children's and youth literature category in 2017.

In 2014 he won the "Vittoria Samarelli Literary Award" (Castel Goffredo, Italy).
