= Sallatunturi =

Resort village in Salla, Finland

Coordinates: 66.7622°N 28.7692°E

Sallatunturi is a settlement in Lapland, Finland, located around 10 km south of Salla municipality. It is the location of Salla Ski Resort, which comprises downhill ski slopes, cross-country skiing trails, hotels, a spa, restaurants, and bars; the resort variously uses the slogan "in the middle of nowhere" or "in the middle of snowhere".
