= Jyrki Hämäläinen =

Finnish magazine editor

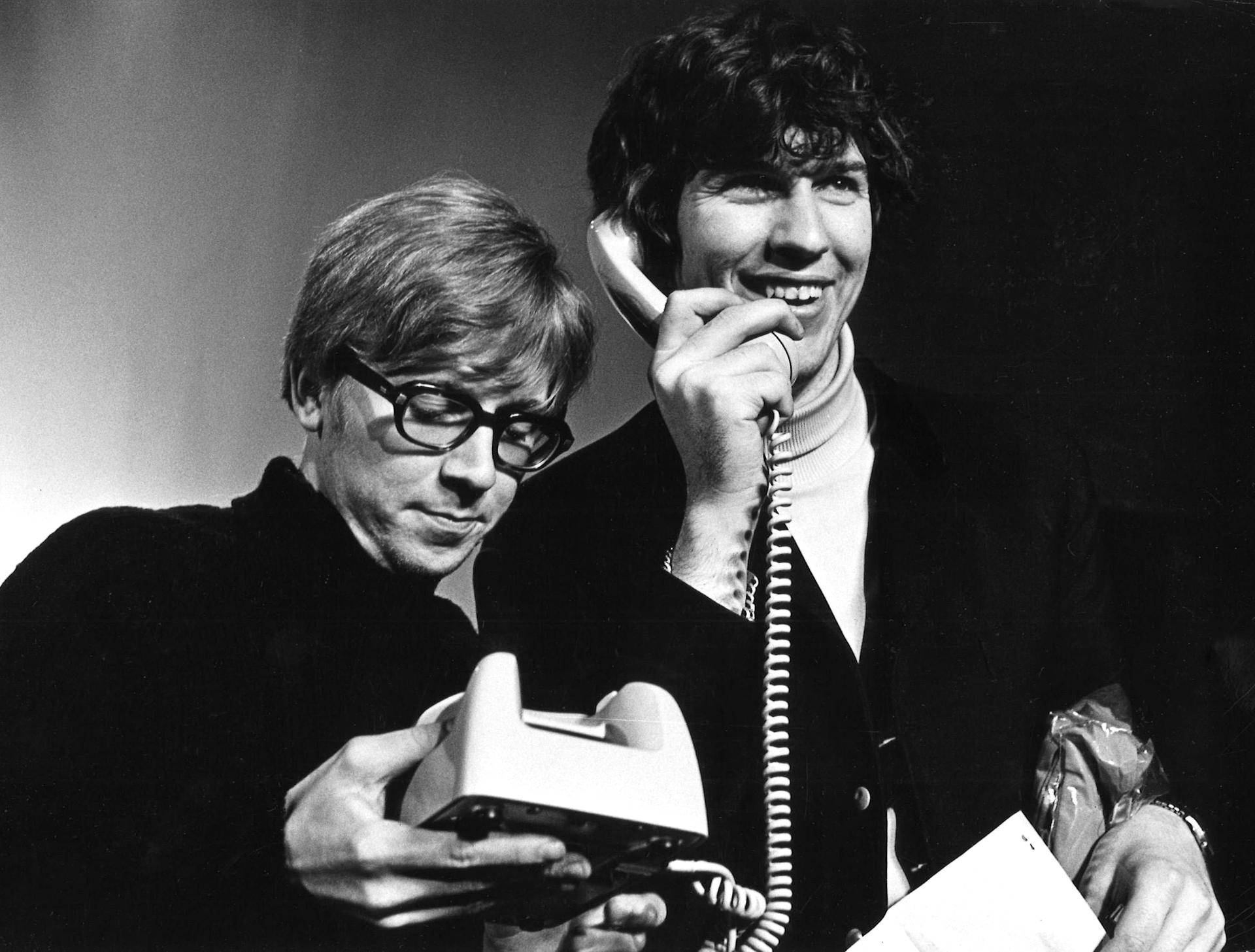
- Born: 27 July 1942; Tampere, Finland
- Died: 18 March 2008 (aged 65); Espoo, Finland
- Citizenship: Finnish
- Occupation: journalist
- Writing career
- Pen name: Jyräys, Jyrki-Boy
- Language: Finnish

Jyrki Hämäläinen (27 July 1942 – 18 March 2008) was a Finnish magazine editor who also authored several biographies of prominent figures in Finnish pop culture. Hämäläinen was the former editor of Suosikki, a magazine which focuses on the country's pop music scene. Hämäläinen also worked as an MC, concert promoter, columnist and producer.

Jyrki Hämäläinen was the editor of Suosikki, a teen magazine, from 1968 until his retirement from the publication in 2002. Hämäläinen was well known for interviewing high-profile celebrities including The Rolling Stones, Muhammad Ali and Elvis Presley. Hämäläinen, who often had his photograph taken with the celebrity whom he was interviewing, was nicknamed the "king of the backstage passes."

Hämäläinen also authored several biographies of leading people within Finnish popular culture. The subjects of his writings included Olavi Virta (born 1915 – died 1972), a Finnish tango singer; Urpo Lahtinen (born 1931 – died 1994), a media mogul and the founder of the gossip magazine, Hymy; and Finnish singer Ilkka "Danny" Lipsanen.

Jyrki Hämäläinen died suddenly at the age of 65 at his home in Espoo, Finland, on 18 March 2008. Hämäläinen had complained of stress and had been hospitalized due to illness for a short time before he died.

Not to be confused with the Finnish author and journalist Jyrki "Spider" Hämäläinen".
