= Hautajärvi =

Village in Salla, Finland

- Village
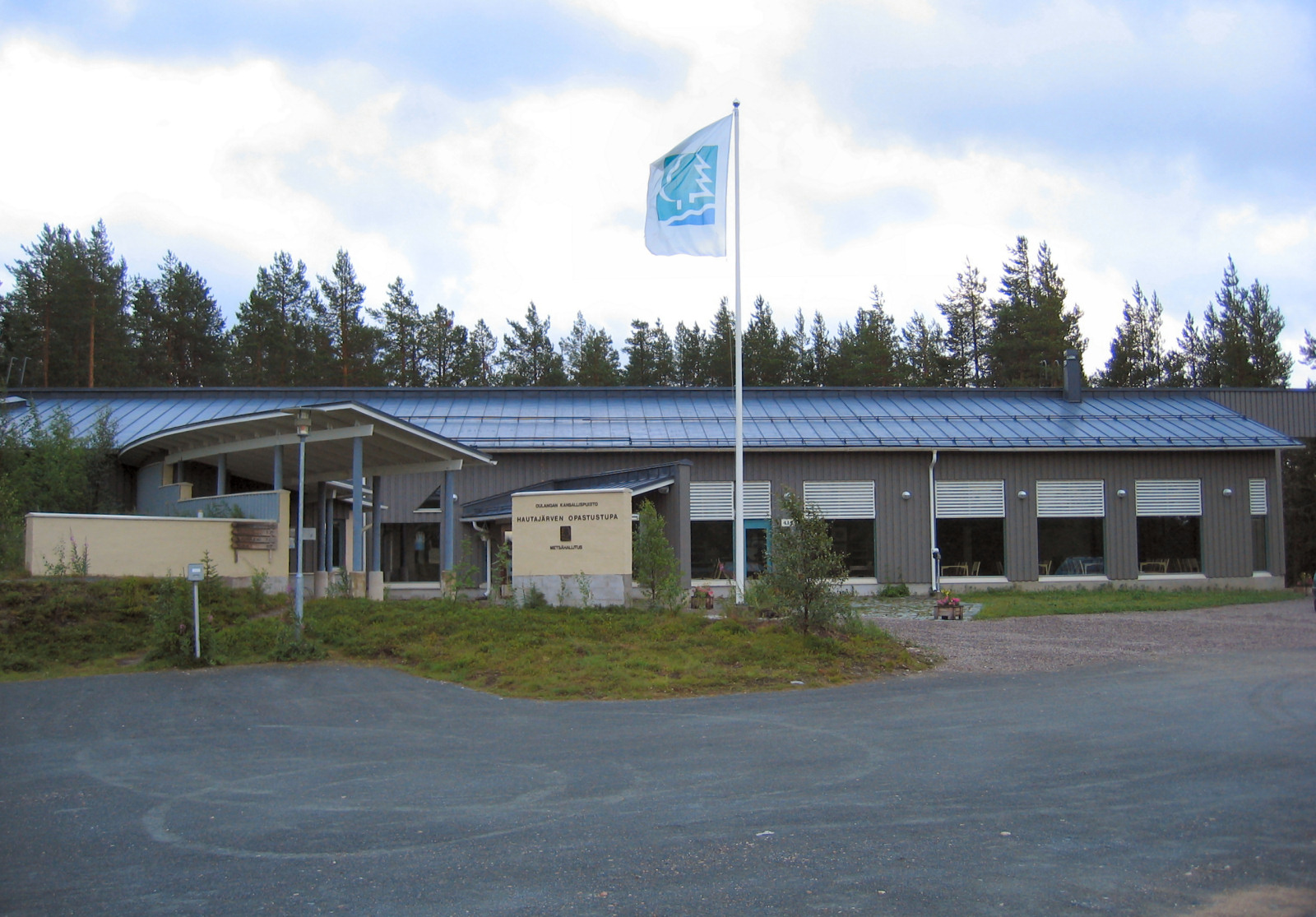
- Hautajärvi information center

- Location in Lapland, Finland
- Coordinates: 66°30′52″N 29°02′13″E
- Country: Finland
- Region: Lapland
- Municipality: Salla

Hautajärvi is a village in southeast Lapland, Finland, near the border with the Republic of Karelia and the Murmansk Oblast of the Russian Federation. Hautajärvi is located in the Salla municipality. It is a trail head for the Bear's Ring hiking trail, and gateway for the Oulanka National Park.
