= Nyrok City =

Colour comic strip

Nyrok City is a colour comic strip drawn by the Finnish artist Mauri Kunnas from 1975 to 1986, published in the youth magazines Intro, Help! and Suosikki. The first story in the comic was Esittely ("introduction"), published in Intro issue 11 in November 1975. Intro was published twelve times per year. The last Nyrok City story One More Time: Nyrok City was published in Suosikki in July 1986. Kunnas was awarded the "Puupäähattu" award for Nyrok City by the Finnish Comics Society on 4 June 1981. The strip is about the world of popular culture and various Finnish and foreign bands, with their names comically twisted.

Even though Nyrok City was originally only published in magazines, the entire run was later published in collections Nyrok City Kollektion 1 (1984), Nyrok City Kollektion 2 (1993) and The best & wörst of Nyrok City (2000). Strips similar to Nyrok City have also been published in the collections Nyrok Daily News Presents: Kotlant Jaarti (1982) and Mac Moose ja Jagge Migreenin tapaus (1986). Jagge Migreeni is a parody of Mick Jagger.

Language plays a prominent part in the Nyrok City strips. Most of the characters speak in a similar manner. The speech of the characters is heavily based on the Tyrvää dialect, which is also Mauri Kunnas's own home dialect. The Tyrvää dialect is spoken in Kunnas's hometown Vammala (nowadays part of Sastamala). Thus Nyrok City characters often use open diphthongs (kiäli instead of kieli "language", tyä instead of työ "work"), replace standard Finnish "d" with "r" (homehrutaan instead of homehdutaan "we're getting bored", literally "we're growing mold", rarikaali instead of radikaali "radical"), and use only one "s" in the inessive case (syrjäsä, Suamesa, näisä vanhemisa naisisa instead of syrjässä, Suomessa, näissä vanhemmissa naisissa "far away", "in Finland", "in these older women"). The strip also uses many words specific to the Tyrvää dialect not found in standard Finnish (helppeesti, hoto, punttu, pöykky). As well as the Tyrvää dialect, Kunnas has used youth slang of his time and neologisms he has invented himself. English language words in Nyrok City are often intentionally spelled badly to evoke a feel of a Finnish accent, and voiced consonants in loanwords are often replaced with voiceless consonants (G becomes K, D becomes T and B becomes P).

Although "Junttila" ("yokel-land") meaning Finland and "the entire world" were often contrasted, Kunnas in a way defended Finnishness and poked fun at Finnish rock stars who felt it was beneath them. The strip especially poked fun at Hanoi Rocks, Finland's only internationally successful band in the 1980s, who often gave statements of how the rest of the world and Stockholm in particular was better than the Finnish "yokel scene". Often the central plot of a Nyrok City strip is an international rock star ending up in the middle of a Finnish forest and the "yokel people". For example in the story Malka: Sarjakuva tabuista (Suosikki #3/1981) "Miki Hiiri" (Michael Monroe) ended up in the middle of a Finnish forest and preferred to stick his head into the sweaty boot of a Finnish farmer to breathing the fresh winter air of the Finnish countryside. The smell of that sweaty boot reminded him of the sewers of the international city of Stockholm. Another story was about a whisky-drinking E.T. (Keith Richards) ending up in a Finnish forest, and after getting back to the private jet of his band Rolling Stones complaining to his fellow bandmembers how Finland was an awful place because "they only had milk to drink".

An Estonian band was named "Nyrok City" after the strip. Mauri Kunnas himself also formed a band named "Nyrok Dolls" after the strip. The name "Nyrok City" is a Finnish spelling of "New Rock City", which in turn is a parody of New York City. The name "Nyrok Dolls" comes from the band New York Dolls.
