= Suosikki =

Former music magazine in Finland (1961–2012)

Suosikki (Finnish for "favourite") was the longest-lived youth magazine in Finland, published from 1961 to 2012. It was published by Otavamedia. The magazine was discontinued at the end of 2012. Jyrki Hämäläinen served as the magazine's editor for 35 years (from 1968 to 2003) and the magazine has been called his life's work.

== History ==
Suosikki was originally Fazer's record company Finnlevy's response to Scandia-Musiikki's music magazine Iskelmä ("schlager"). It was founded as a continuation of Fazer's Musiikkiviesti ("music news") magazine. The first issue was published in August 1961. It first covered schlager music, which did not succeed very well, so the magazine was changed to focus more on youth music.

The new line of the magazine was started by Isto Lysmä in 1963. He invented the giant centre posters which became an iconic part of the magazine. The first poster was published in issue #4/1963. The posters, eight magazine pages in size, were printed with two colours (black and red), which gave an impression of colour printing. In a time before the flood of popular culture supply, Suosikki grew to an especially important status in the Finnish youth subculture. Appearing on the cover and on the centre posters of the magazine was a status which many Finnish popular music stars sought, as Suosikki was the primary medium through which the youth heard of new bands and artists in the 1980s.

In the 1960s and the 1970s competitors of Suosikki included Stump edited by Ilkka Sysimetsä alias Frederik and Intro edited by Markku Veijalainen. Urpo Lahtinen, owner of Lehtimiehet Oy, Suosikki's publisher at the time, bought out the magazine's competitors one at a time just to discontinue them. Suosikki was offered as a replacement of the competing magazines, and reached a distribution of 150 thousand printed copies. The magazine's original competitor, Iskelmä published by Skandia-Musiikki, was discontinued in 1967.

In 1968 Suosikki editor Isto Lysmä moved to editor of the men's magazine Nyrkkiposti by the same publisher and Jyrki Hämäläinen became the editor of Suosikki until 2003, when he was succeeded by Katja Ståhl. Ståhl stepped down as editor of Suosikki on 31 December 2007. She was succeeded on 4 January 2008 by Ville Kormilainen. The last editor of the magazine was Elli Mäkilä.

From 1974, every issue of Suosikki had two pages of the health column Bees & Honey which became very popular. The column was hosted by physician Erkki-Pekka Helle who answered questions about health from the youth, which usually started with the words Dear Eki. (Note: Most of the letters started with the actual English-language greeting "Dear Eki", even though the letters themselves were in Finnish.) Other concepts and phenomena associated with the magazine were the Miss Farkku Suomi contest and the Kultaturbo ("golden turbo") extra large issue published every August. The magazine also held elections of best musician, best actor and best sportsperson in every issue. The magazine also included comics, including Nyrok City by Mauri Kunnas, published in Suosikki from 1979 to 1986.

In its final years, Suosikki was transformed to mostly target girls, and it started concentrating on girls' fashion as well as on music. This caused the popularity of the magazine to considerably wane, especially as it was competed by the more successful girls' magazine Demi. In 2012 Otavamedia discontinued Suosikki as it was no longer worth publishing. The discontinuation was explained also by changes in the youth's media behaviour, the establishment of Internet culture and the fragmentation of music consumption. The last issue was published in December 2012.

== List of editors ==
- Olli Hämäläinen: 1961 - 1962
- Pertti Klemola: 1962 - 1963
- Isto Lysmä: 1963 - 1968
- Jyrki Hämäläinen: 1968 - 2003
- Katja Ståhl: 2003 - 2008
- Ville Kormilainen: 2008 - 2012
- Elli Mäkilä: 2012 - 2012
