= Seitajärvi =

Community in Savukoski, Finland

Coordinates: 67°33′41″N 27°53′09″E

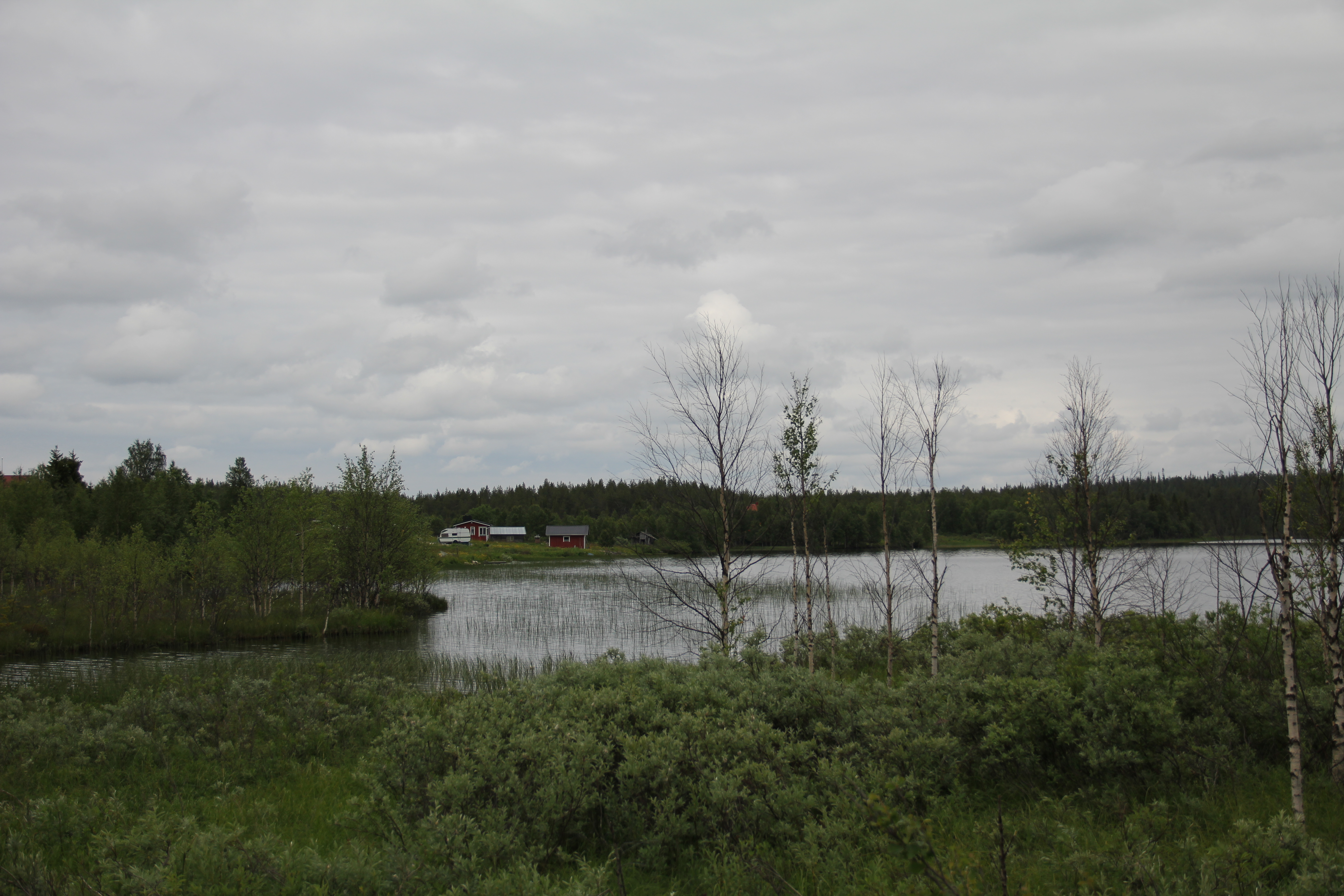
Lake Seitajärvi, northwest bank

Seitajärvi (seita: a Sami sacred place + järvi: lake) was a community located in the Savukoski municipality of Finland.

In 1940 the Seitajärvi community included five farming and reindeer enterprises.

On July 7, 1944, Seitajärvi suffered a devastating attack (fi) by Soviet partisans.

Many families of this community relocated to Kittilä in northwest Lapland, and nowadays, the Seitajärvi people have no standing settlements.

== See also ==
- Military history of Finland during World War II
- Soviet war crimes § Finland
- The Cuckoo (film), set in World War II Lapland
