= Kayraly =

Kayraly Кайралы
- Posyolok
- Interactive map of Kayraly
- Location of Kayraly Kayraly (Murmansk Oblast)
- Coordinates: 66°55′59″N 29°36′0″E
- Country: Russia
- Federal subject: Murmansk Oblast
- Administrative district: Kandalakshskiy District

Population (2010 Census)
  - Total: 19
  - Estimate (2021): 26 (+36.8%)
- Time zone: UTC+3 (MSK)
- Postal code: 184020
- Dialing code: +7 81533
- OKTMO ID: 47608403106

Kayraly (Finnish: Kairala, Russian: Кайралы) is a rural locality (a Posyolok) in Kandalakshskiy District of Murmansk Oblast, Russia. The village is located beyond the Arctic Circle. Its altitude is 213 metres (699 ft).
