= Santa Claus and the Magic Drum =

1996 animated television film

- Finnish: Joulupukki ja noitarumpu
- Based on: Santa Claus and the Magic Drum by Mauri Kunnas
- Directed by: Mauri Kunnas; Pekka Lehtosaari
- Starring: Esa Saario; Ulla Tapaninen; Henna Haverinen; Olli Parviainen; Aarre Karén
- Countries of origin: Finland; Hungary

Production
- Producer: Jussi-Pekka Koskiranta
- Editor: Päivi Myllymäki
- Running time: 51 minutes
- Production company: Yleisradio

Original release
- Release: 24 December 1996

Santa Claus and the Magic Drum (original Finnish title: Joulupukki ja noitarumpu, Swedish: Jultomten och trolltrumman) is a 1996 Finnish-Hungarian animation film. The story is based on a 1995 children's book of the same name by Mauri Kunnas. The 51-minute film has been recorded in Finnish, English (British) and Swedish. It was made for TV broadcasting and was first shown on Christmas Eve 1996, and has been broadcast on Yle TV2 nearly every Christmas Eve since. Santa Claus and the Magic Drum has been sold to over 40 countries.

In addition to Mauri Kunnas and his wife Tarja Kunnas, the illustrator Sami Toivonen and the cartoonist Kari Korhonen participated in the designing of the animation. The animation work of the film was subcontracted to a Hungarian animation studio Funny Films, operating in Pécs, and involved 50 people.

== Plot ==
While reading his usual gift wish mail, Santa Claus stumbles upon an unusual letter which everyone assume to be a gift wish letter from a boy called Vekara. Santa Claus can not decide what kind of gift the letter, which is a child's drawing, asks for, so he and his two helpers Noora and Ville decide to go and show it to the master elf. At the same time odd things are happening around Santa's village, and strange accidents follow Santa. The peculiar events are traced back to a noaidi practicing shamanism with a powerful magic drum. At the end of the film the shaman explains that he sent the mysterious letter as a child, and the drawing is him dressed as an elf because he wanted to be Santa's little Christmas helper. By accident the letter was not delivered to Santa, and as years passed and Santa did not reply, Vekara became begrudged. After both sides of the story are told the situation is resolved, Santa grants Vekara his wish and makes him a helper elf, and all ends well.

== Cast ==
Finnish voice actors:

Esa Saario	Santa Claus
Ulla Tapaninen	Mrs. Claus
Henna Haverinen	Noora
Olli Parviainen	Ville
Aarre Karén	Vekara
Veikko Honkanen	Agricola, Sakari Sokeri
Vesa Vierikko	Juho Vaneeri
Eija Ahvo	Tara
Markku Riikonen	Feetu Faktori
Rinna Paatso	Nelli Nukkemaakari
Annamari Metsävainio	Bertta Bitti
Antti Pääkkönen	Martti
Sami Aarva	pilot
Jarkko Tamminen	pilot
Seppo Pääkkönen	Antti

The theme music "Joulupukin töissä" was performed by J. Karjalainen and his band Electric Sauna.

== Television broadcasts ==
Date	Channel
24 December 1996	YLE TV2
29 November 1997	FST
6 December 1998	YLE TV2
21 December 2001	YLE TV2
21 December 2002	YLE TV2
23 December 2004	YLE TV2
23 December 2006	YLE TV2
24 December 2007	YLE TV2
22 December 2008	YLE TV2
24 December 2008	YLE FST5
24 December 2010	YLE TV2
24 December 2011	YLE TV2
24 December 2012	YLE TV2
24 December 2013	Yle TV2
25 December 2014	YLE TV2
24 December 2015	Yle TV2
24 December 2016	Yle TV2
23 December 2017	Yle TV2
24 December 2019	Yle TV2
24 December 2020	Yle TV2

== See also ==
- List of Christmas films
- Santa Claus in film
