= Kemijärven maalaiskunta =

Former municipality of Finland

Location of Kemijärven maalaiskunta

Kemijärven maalaiskunta is a former municipality in Finland.

Consolidated to Kemijärvi in 1973.
