= Savukoski =

Savukoski Suovvaguoika (Northern Sami) Suovâkuoškâ (Inari Sami) Suõvvkuõškk (Skolt Sami)
- Municipality
- Savukosken kunta Savukoski kommun
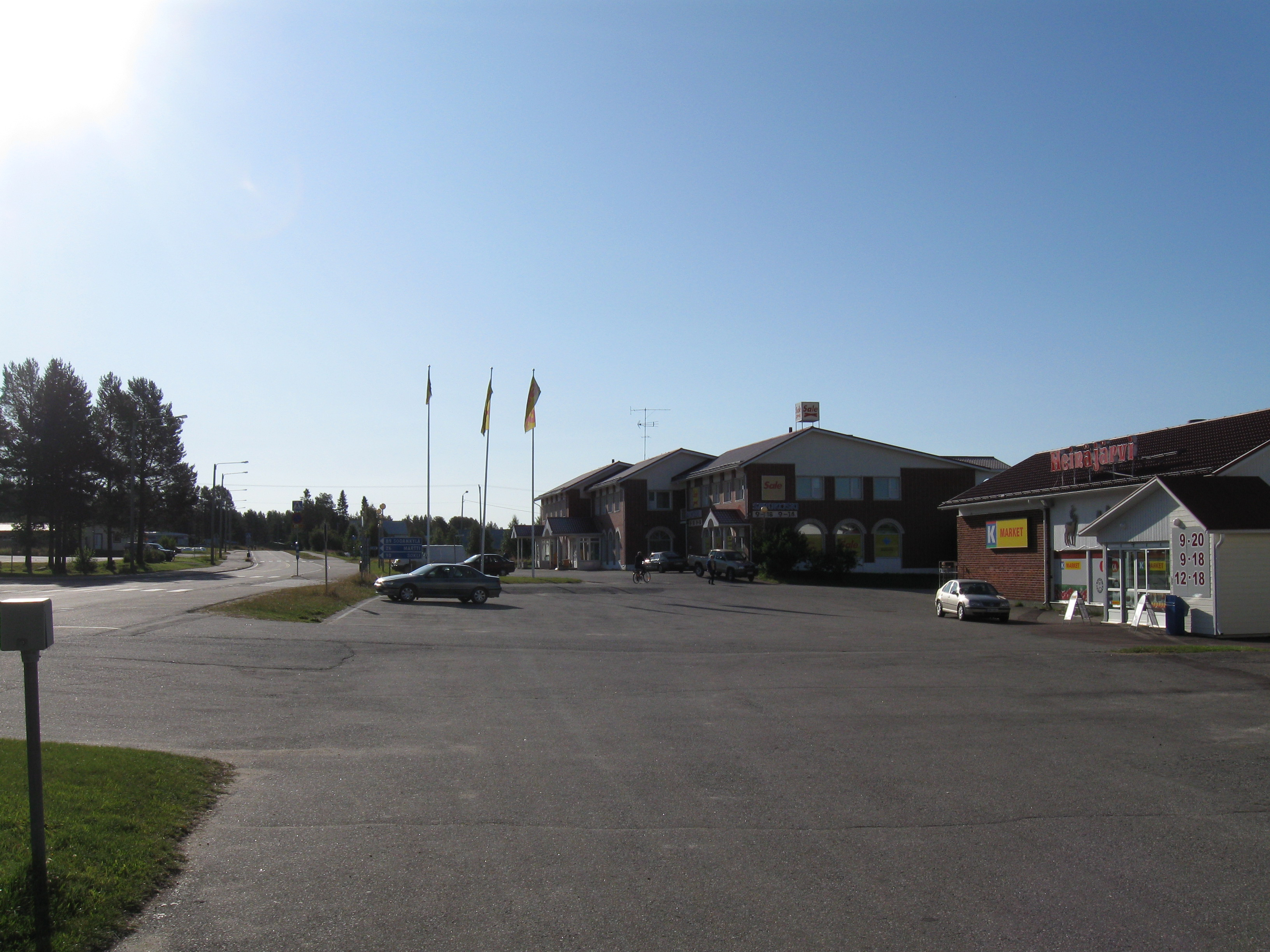
- Centre of Savukoski.

- Coat of arms

- Location of Savukoski in Finland
- OpenStreetMap Interactive map outlining Savukoski.
- Interactive map of Savukoski
- Coordinates: 67°17.5′N 028°10′E
- Country: Finland
- Region: Lapland
- Sub-region: Eastern Lapland
- Charter: 1916

Government
  - Municipal manager: Petri Härkönen

Area (2018-01-01)
  - Total: 6,495.95 km^{2} (2,508.10 sq mi)
  - Land: 6,440.08 km^{2} (2,486.53 sq mi)
  - Water: 57.93 km^{2} (22.37 sq mi)
  - Rank: 6th largest in Finland

Population (2025-12-31)
  - Total: 974
  - Rank: 294th largest in Finland
  - Density: 0.15/km^{2} (0.39/sq mi)

Population by native language
  - Finnish: 97.2% (official)
  - Others: 2.8%

Population by age
  - 0 to 14: 10%
  - 15 to 64: 56.9%
  - 65 or older: 33.1%
- Time zone: UTC+02:00 (EET)
  - Summer (DST): UTC+03:00 (EEST)
- Website: www.savukoski.fi

Savukoski (Northern Sami: Suovvaguoika; Inari Sami: Suovâkuoškâ; Skolt Sami: Suõvvkuõškk) is a municipality of Finland.

It is located in the province of Lapland, Finland. The municipality has a population of 974 (31 December 2025) and covers an area of 6,495.95 square kilometres (2,508.10 sq mi) of which 57.93 km^{2} (22.37 sq mi) is water. The population density is 0.15 inhabitants per square kilometre (0.39/sq mi), which is the lowest in relation to other Finnish municipalities. Neighbour municipalities are Pelkosenniemi, Salla and Sodankylä.

The municipality is unilingually Finnish.

According to Finnish folklore, the Korvatunturi Fell in Savukoski municipality is the location of Father Christmas's (Joulupukki) secret workshop, where toys, trinkets and gifts are made and eventually wrapped by gnomes. The name Korvatunturi translates into English as "Ear Fell". Finnish children are told that from "Ear Fell" Father Christmas can hear what all the children are saying so he can find out if the children behave and obey their parents (and therefore may receive gifts next Christmas).

Savukoski is one of the largest municipalities in Finland, areawise, and the most sparsely settled. The river Kemijoki runs through it. Forestry and reindeer husbandry have traditionally been the main livelihood of the local population. There are ten times more reindeer than people in Savukoski. Nowadays tourism is also getting more important.

The Urho Kekkonen National Park is also located partly in Savukoski.

A bog region called Äteritsiputeritsipuolilautatsijänkä is in Savukoski. It has the longest place name in Finland.

== Notable people ==
- Markus Mustajärvi (born 1963), Finnish politician

== See also ==
- Seitajärvi, a former community in Savukoski
