= Joulupukki =

Christmas figure from Finland

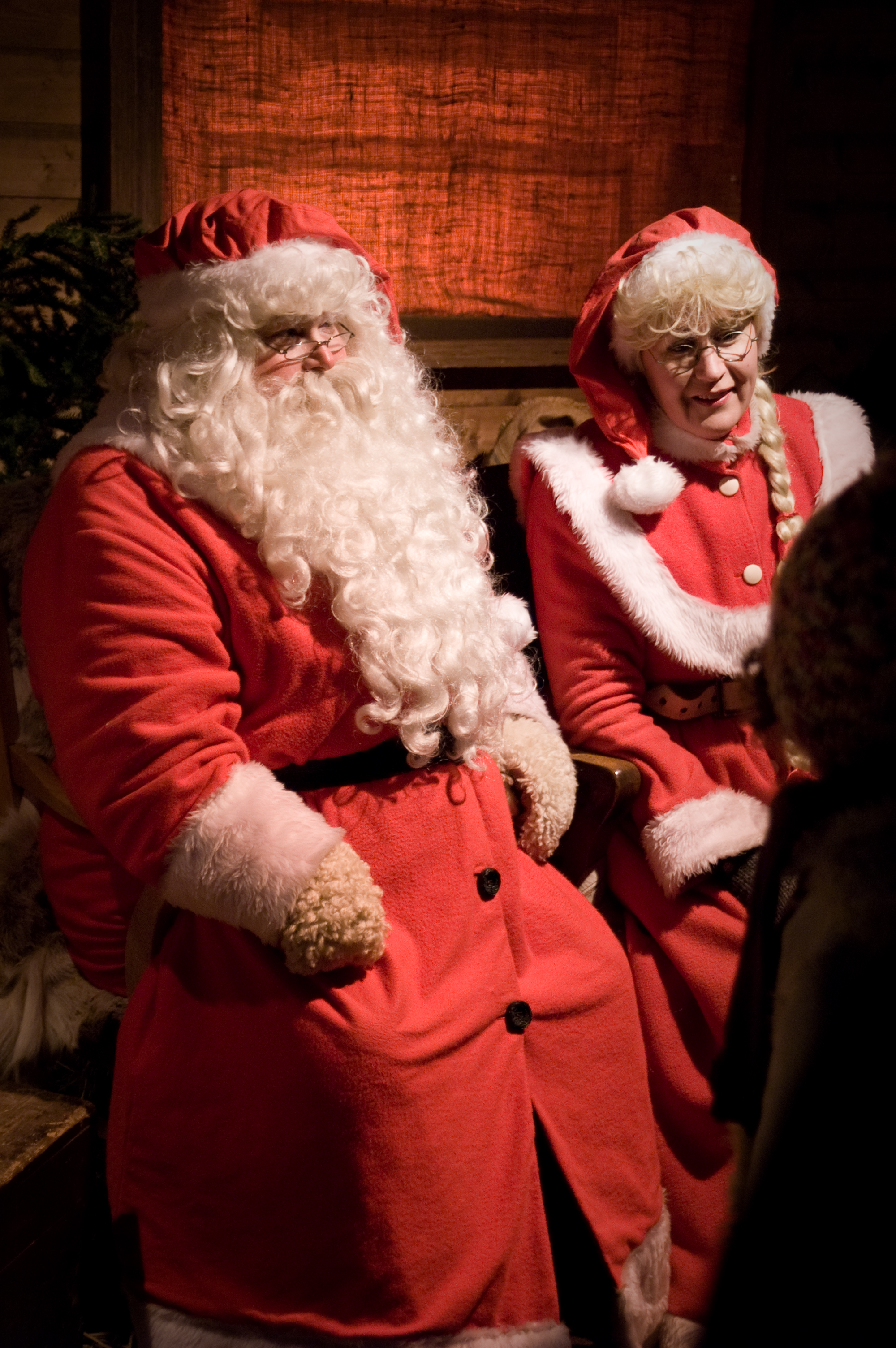
Joulupukki and his wife.

Joulupukki (Finnish: [ˈjou̯luˌpukːi]) is a Finnish Christmas figure. The name joulupukki literally means 'Christmas goat' or 'Yule goat' in Finnish; the word pukki comes from the Old Swedish word bukker, a cognate of English "buck", meaning 'billy-goat'. An old Nordic folk tradition, the figure is now often conflated with Santa Claus.

== Origins and description ==
The Finnish Father Christmas Joulupukki (literally "Christmas goat") appears connected with the Scandinavian julebukk, not the "Yule goat" as such, but rather the ritual theatrics of men dressed up in costume rowdily going around villages (see Julebukking). Thus an older dictionary glosses Finnish joulu-ukko (lit. "Yule's old man") as Swedish julebock.

Today, in some parts of Finland, the folk custom persists of persons performing in goat costume in return for leftover Christmas food. The performer traditionally is an older man, who is called a "nuuttipukki".

In Finland in its modern incarnation, inspired by the international Santa Claus figure, he usually wears warm red robes, but with a broad band of blue near the fur, uses a walking stick, and travels in a sleigh pulled by a number of reindeer (which do not fly, unlike Santa Claus' team). In Lapland, he rides in a pulkka, rather than a sleigh. The popular holiday song "Rudolph the Red-Nosed Reindeer", in its Finnish translation, Petteri Punakuono, has led to Rudolph's general acceptance in Finland as Joulupukki's lead reindeer. Joulupukki is often mentioned as having a wife, Joulumuori (lit. 'Old Lady Christmas'), but tradition says little of her.

== Joulupukki's other side ==
Popular radio programs from the year 1927 onwards probably had great influence in reformatting the concept with the Santa-like costume, reindeer and Korvatunturi as his dwelling place. Because there really are reindeer in Finland, and Finns live up North, the popular American story took root in Finland very quickly.

Finland's Joulupukki receives over 500,000 letters from over 200 countries every year. Most letters come from Poland, Italy, China, Taiwan, Hong Kong, and Macau.

Joulupukki is a prominent character in Rare Exports, a film based on the award-winning shorts by Jalmari Helander.

== See also ==
- Section on Finland in Christmas worldwide
- Korvatunturi
- Rare Exports (film)
- Santa Claus Village
- Yule Goat
- Krampus
