= Salla =

- Municipality
- Sallan kunta Salla kommun
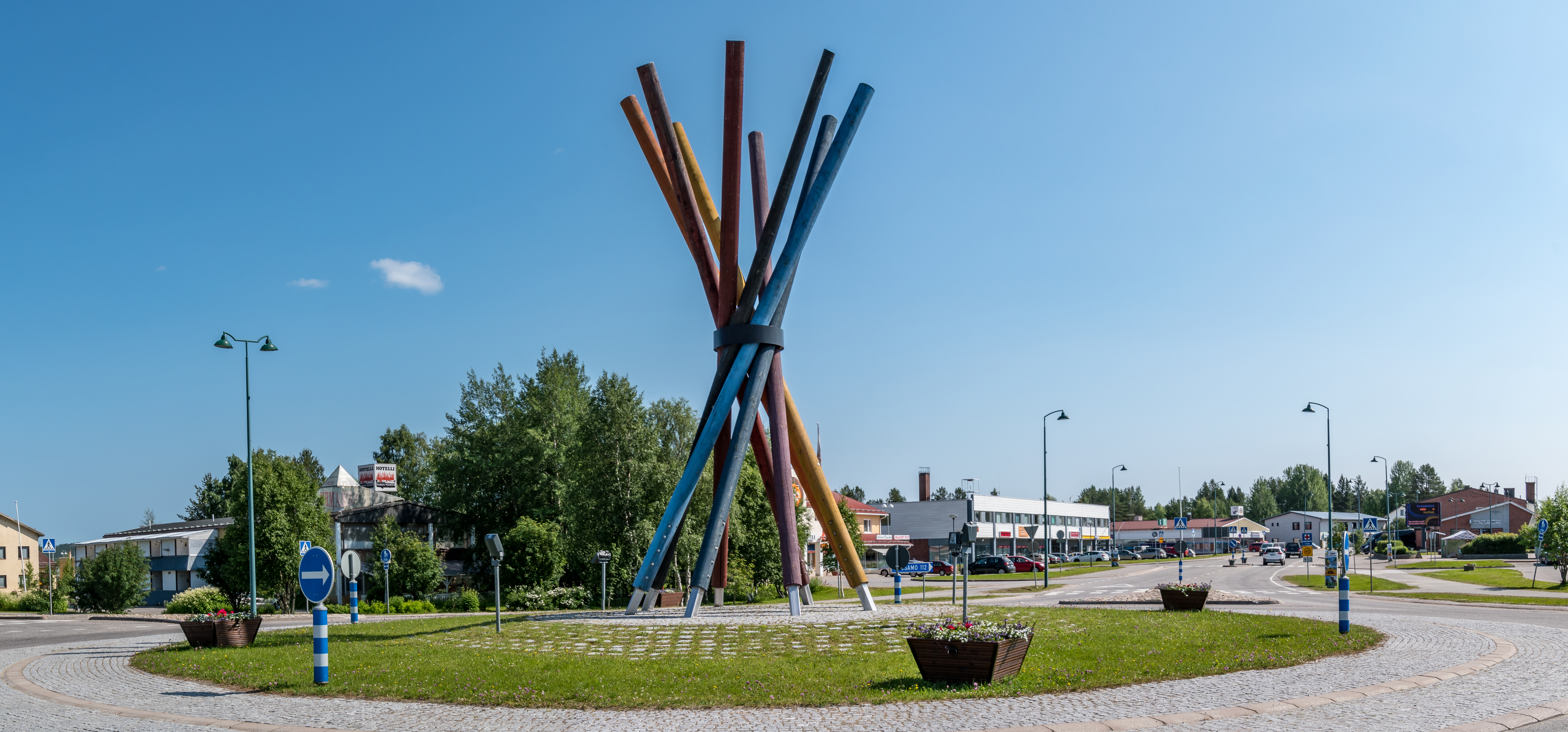

- Coat of arms

- Location of Salla in Finland
- Interactive map of Salla
- Coordinates: 66°50′N 028°40′E
- Country: Finland
- Region: Lapland
- Sub-region: Eastern Lapland
- Charter: 1857

Government
  - Municipal manager: Erkki Parkkinen

Area (2018-01-01)
  - Total: 5,873.08 km^{2} (2,267.61 sq mi)
  - Land: 5,729.81 km^{2} (2,212.29 sq mi)
  - Water: 142.73 km^{2} (55.11 sq mi)
  - Rank: 7th largest in Finland

Population (2025-12-31)
  - Total: 3,231
  - Rank: 207th largest in Finland
  - Density: 0.56/km^{2} (1.5/sq mi)

Population by native language
  - Finnish: 95.8% (official)
  - Others: 4.2%

Population by age
  - 0 to 14: 8.7%
  - 15 to 64: 52%
  - 65 or older: 39.3%
- Time zone: UTC+02:00 (EET)
  - Summer (DST): UTC+03:00 (EEST)
- Website: www.salla.fi/en/

Salla, known as Kuolajärvi until 1936, is a municipality of Finland, located in Lapland. The municipality has a population of 3,231 (31 December 2025) and covers an area of 5,873.08 square kilometres (2,267.61 sq mi) of which 142.73 km^{2} (55.11 sq mi) is water. The population density is 0.56 inhabitants per square kilometre (1.5/sq mi).

The nearby settlement of Sallatunturi is home to the Salla Ski Resort.

== History ==
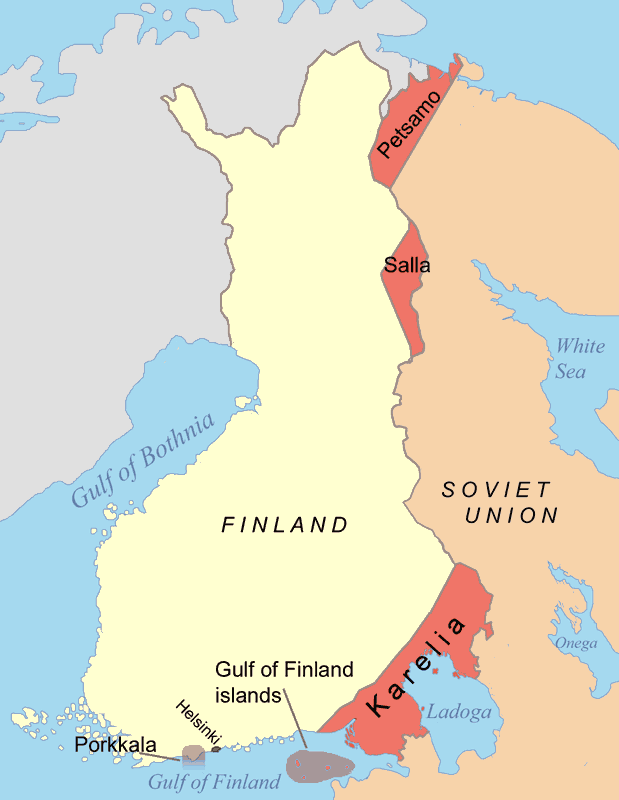
Areas ceded to Soviet Union at the end of World War II

Salla is in the Eastern Lapland and as a border area was affected by the Second World War. Red Army troops invaded Finland at Salla during the Winter War but were stopped by the Finnish Army. Parts of the municipality were ceded to the Soviet Union after the war. The ceded part is sometimes called "Old Salla" or Vanha Salla. During the Continuation War the old town of Salla was on the Soviet side of the border. The German XXXVI Corps attacked the Soviet positions in an operation code-named Polarfuchs. With the help of the Finnish 6th Division it managed to occupy all of the ceded territories. At the end of the war the German troops were pushed out of Lapland by Finnish troops in the Lapland War.

The following villages were ceded to the Soviet Union: Alakurtti, Korja (Korya), Kuolajärvi (Kuoloyarvi), Lampela, Sallansuu, Yläkurtti (Yulyakurtti), Sovajärvi (Sovayarvi), Tuutijärvi (Tuutiyarvi) and Vuorijärvi (Vuoriyarvi).

In January 2021, the mayor of Salla, Erkki Parkkinen, launched a bid to host the 2032 Summer Olympics to raise awareness of climate change and highlight the threat the climate crisis poses to Salla and its ecosystem, which is dependent on low temperatures for most of the year.

== Transportation ==
Salla is the terminus of a freight-only railway line from Kemijärvi. In 2006, the Finnish Rail Administration announced proposals to close the line. The railway formerly extended beyond Salla into Russia, but has never carried international traffic.

== Geography ==
Neighbour municipalities are Kemijärvi, Kuusamo, Pelkosenniemi, Posio and Savukoski.

=== Climate ===
Salla has a subarctic climate (Dfc). Summer days are mild with about 1/3 of all days experiencing precipitation with nights tending to be cool. Winters are very long, cold, snowy, and extremely cloudy, lasting from the beginning of October through April, with mid-winter thaws being rare, and cold snaps relatively common. Spring and Autumn tend to be cool, not very variable, and short, lasting only a couple weeks to a few weeks in length.

The low temperature record of Salla is -50,4 °C (-58,7 °F), which was recorded in Naruskajärvi in 1985. It was also the record of Finland until 1999. On 28 January 1999, the unofficial record of Finland, -54,3 °C (-65,7 °F), was recorded in Naruska.

Climate data for Salla (1991–2020 normals, records 1961–present)
Month	Jan	Feb	Mar	Apr	May	Jun	Jul	Aug	Sep	Oct	Nov	Dec	Year
Record high °C (°F)	6.3 (43.3)	6.2 (43.2)	9.7 (49.5)	17.5 (63.5)	28.0 (82.4)	30.3 (86.5)	31.5 (88.7)	31.0 (87.8)	22.9 (73.2)	14.5 (58.1)	8.4 (47.1)	5.0 (41.0)	31.5 (88.7)
Mean maximum °C (°F)	1.0 (33.8)	1.3 (34.3)	4.8 (40.6)	11.5 (52.7)	20.6 (69.1)	24.9 (76.8)	26.3 (79.3)	24.2 (75.6)	18.0 (64.4)	9.5 (49.1)	4.0 (39.2)	2.0 (35.6)	27.3 (81.1)
Mean daily maximum °C (°F)	−8.0 (17.6)	−7.5 (18.5)	−2.1 (28.2)	3.8 (38.8)	10.4 (50.7)	16.6 (61.9)	19.7 (67.5)	16.8 (62.2)	10.8 (51.4)	2.8 (37.0)	−2.5 (27.5)	−5.6 (21.9)	4.6 (40.3)
Daily mean °C (°F)	−12.0 (10.4)	−11.6 (11.1)	−6.9 (19.6)	−0.7 (30.7)	5.7 (42.3)	11.7 (53.1)	14.8 (58.6)	12.1 (53.8)	6.9 (44.4)	0.3 (32.5)	−5.3 (22.5)	−9.1 (15.6)	0.5 (32.9)
Mean daily minimum °C (°F)	−16.7 (1.9)	−16.5 (2.3)	−12.6 (9.3)	−5.8 (21.6)	0.7 (33.3)	6.3 (43.3)	9.5 (49.1)	7.2 (45.0)	2.9 (37.2)	−2.6 (27.3)	−8.5 (16.7)	−13.1 (8.4)	−4.1 (24.6)
Mean minimum °C (°F)	−32.9 (−27.2)	−32.4 (−26.3)	−28.4 (−19.1)	−19.8 (−3.6)	−7.1 (19.2)	−0.9 (30.4)	1.8 (35.2)	−1.3 (29.7)	−5.5 (22.1)	−15.7 (3.7)	−23.0 (−9.4)	−28.9 (−20.0)	−35.6 (−32.1)
Record low °C (°F)	−45.3 (−49.5)	−46.3 (−51.3)	−38.2 (−36.8)	−30.8 (−23.4)	−19.2 (−2.6)	−6.7 (19.9)	−1.5 (29.3)	−6.5 (20.3)	−15.2 (4.6)	−29.7 (−21.5)	−36.6 (−33.9)	−40.2 (−40.4)	−46.3 (−51.3)
Average precipitation mm (inches)	37 (1.5)	31 (1.2)	31 (1.2)	30 (1.2)	41 (1.6)	61 (2.4)	77 (3.0)	59 (2.3)	54 (2.1)	50 (2.0)	40 (1.6)	39 (1.5)	550 (21.6)
Average precipitation days (≥ 0.1 mm)	20	17	16	14	15	16	17	16	16	18	21	20	206
Average relative humidity (%)	87	86	80	73	68	68	74	80	85	90	92	89	81
Source 1: FMI climatological normals for Finland 1991–2020
Source 2: record highs and lows (Note: Extreme values from 1961-1999, at Salla kk weather station; Extreme values from 1999-present, at Salla kirkonkylä weather station)

Climate data for Salla Naruska (1991-2020 normals, extremes 1974–1990 from Naruskajärvi, 1991–present from Naruska)
Month	Jan	Feb	Mar	Apr	May	Jun	Jul	Aug	Sep	Oct	Nov	Dec	Year
Record high °C (°F)	6.2 (43.2)	5.5 (41.9)	9.0 (48.2)	16.8 (62.2)	28.2 (82.8)	31.3 (88.3)	30.9 (87.6)	30.4 (86.7)	23.0 (73.4)	14.3 (57.7)	7.9 (46.2)	6.2 (43.2)	31.3 (88.3)
Mean maximum °C (°F)	0.9 (33.6)	1.2 (34.2)	4.8 (40.6)	10.8 (51.4)	20.5 (68.9)	25.0 (77.0)	26.1 (79.0)	24.0 (75.2)	17.6 (63.7)	9.3 (48.7)	3.5 (38.3)	1.6 (34.9)	27.1 (80.8)
Mean daily maximum °C (°F)	−8.4 (16.9)	−7.8 (18.0)	−2.2 (28.0)	3.5 (38.3)	10.1 (50.2)	16.5 (61.7)	19.5 (67.1)	16.9 (62.4)	10.8 (51.4)	2.5 (36.5)	−2.7 (27.1)	−5.9 (21.4)	4.4 (39.9)
Daily mean °C (°F)	−13.1 (8.4)	−12.9 (8.8)	−8.2 (17.2)	−1.7 (28.9)	4.8 (40.6)	11.0 (51.8)	13.9 (57.0)	11.1 (52.0)	6.2 (43.2)	−0.3 (31.5)	−5.9 (21.4)	−9.9 (14.2)	−0.4 (31.3)
Mean daily minimum °C (°F)	−18.5 (−1.3)	−18.3 (−0.9)	−14.8 (5.4)	−7.5 (18.5)	−0.4 (31.3)	4.9 (40.8)	7.9 (46.2)	5.7 (42.3)	1.4 (34.5)	−3.4 (25.9)	−9.3 (15.3)	−14.4 (6.1)	−5.6 (21.9)
Mean minimum °C (°F)	−35.9 (−32.6)	−35.2 (−31.4)	−30.5 (−22.9)	−22.7 (−8.9)	−8.4 (16.9)	−1.7 (28.9)	0.2 (32.4)	−2.4 (27.7)	−6.4 (20.5)	−17.0 (1.4)	−24.5 (−12.1)	−31.2 (−24.2)	−38.2 (−36.8)
Record low °C (°F)	−50.4 (−58.7)	−44.2 (−47.6)	−42.0 (−43.6)	−34.5 (−30.1)	−16.8 (1.8)	−4.7 (23.5)	−3.6 (25.5)	−10.8 (12.6)	−17.5 (0.5)	−28.5 (−19.3)	−38.7 (−37.7)	−43.5 (−46.3)	−50.4 (−58.7)
Source 1: https://www.ilmatieteenlaitos.fi/1991-2020-lampotilatilastot
Source 2: https://kilotavu.com/fmi-tilastot.php?taulukkomoodi=true

Climate data for Salla Värriötunturi (elevation 360m (1181 ft), 1991-2020 normals, extremes 1974–present)
Month	Jan	Feb	Mar	Apr	May	Jun	Jul	Aug	Sep	Oct	Nov	Dec	Year
Record high °C (°F)	4.0 (39.2)	4.2 (39.6)	7.4 (45.3)	15.5 (59.9)	26.0 (78.8)	29.0 (84.2)	30.4 (86.7)	30.3 (86.5)	21.7 (71.1)	12.5 (54.5)	7.7 (45.9)	4.5 (40.1)	30.4 (86.7)
Mean daily maximum °C (°F)	−8.2 (17.2)	−8.1 (17.4)	−3.7 (25.3)	1.9 (35.4)	7.9 (46.2)	14.6 (58.3)	18.0 (64.4)	15.1 (59.2)	9.1 (48.4)	1.3 (34.3)	−3.5 (25.7)	−5.9 (21.4)	3.2 (37.8)
Daily mean °C (°F)	−10.8 (12.6)	−10.7 (12.7)	−6.7 (19.9)	−1.5 (29.3)	4.0 (39.2)	10.1 (50.2)	13.6 (56.5)	11.2 (52.2)	6.1 (43.0)	−0.7 (30.7)	−5.6 (21.9)	−8.3 (17.1)	0.1 (32.2)
Mean daily minimum °C (°F)	−13.7 (7.3)	−13.5 (7.7)	−9.8 (14.4)	−4.9 (23.2)	0.5 (32.9)	6.0 (42.8)	9.7 (49.5)	7.9 (46.2)	3.5 (38.3)	−2.6 (27.3)	−7.9 (17.8)	−10.9 (12.4)	−3.0 (26.6)
Record low °C (°F)	−38.3 (−36.9)	−31.1 (−24.0)	−26.5 (−15.7)	−19.0 (−2.2)	−13.4 (7.9)	−3.9 (25.0)	−0.1 (31.8)	−2.9 (26.8)	−7.3 (18.9)	−18.5 (−1.3)	−27.6 (−17.7)	−31.1 (−24.0)	−38.3 (−36.9)
Average precipitation mm (inches)	37 (1.5)	32 (1.3)	34 (1.3)	38 (1.5)	52 (2.0)	72 (2.8)	78 (3.1)	67 (2.6)	58 (2.3)	59 (2.3)	40 (1.6)	40 (1.6)	607 (23.9)
Average precipitation days (≥ 0.1 mm)	22	19	18	16	16	15	18	16	16	20	22	22	220
Source 1: https://www.ilmatieteenlaitos.fi/1991-2020-lampotilatilastot
Source 2: https://kilotavu.com/asema-taulukko.php?asema=102012

== Historical places ==
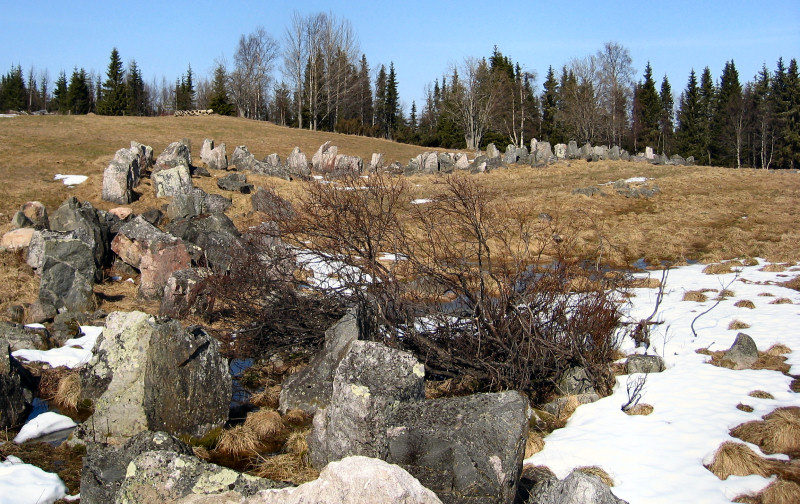
The Salpa Line anti-tank obstacles in Aholanvaara.

Name	Place	Description	WGS 84
Evangelic-Lutheran church of Salla			
Paikanselkä memorial area	Paikanselkä	The Winter War front line 13 March 1940, when war ended. Located where the commander of the Swedish Volunteer Corps, lieutenant colonel Magnus Dyrssen was killed on 1 March 1940.	
Salpa Line		Defense line on the eastern border of Finland	

== In popular culture ==
Salla was referenced in the song 66°50’N, 28°40’E by Finnish death-doom band Swallow the Sun on their 2015 triple album Songs From the North I, II and III.
