= Korvatunturi =

Mountain in Savukoski, Finland

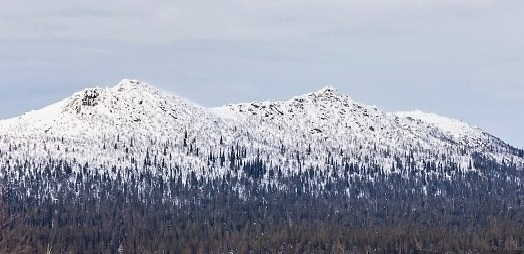
- Korvatunturi seen from the Finnish side, in winter

Highest point
- Elevation: 486 m (1,594 ft)
- Prominence: 210 m (690 ft)
- Coordinates: 68°04′25″N 29°18′55″E

Geography
- Location within Finland
- Location: Savukoski, Lapland, Finland

Korvatunturi is a fell in Lapland, on the border between Finland and Russia. Its Finnish part is within Urho Kekkonen National Park in the municipality of Savukoski. In Finnish the name Korvatunturi means "Ear Fell", referring to the mountain's distinctive profile.

Korvatunturi stands 486 metres (1,594 ft) above sea level; it has three peaks, with the middle peak crossing Finland and Russia's borders. Since Korvatunturi straddles the border of the country, it is in the restricted border zones; all visitors from the Finnish side are required to obtain written permission from the Finnish Border Guard. There is a hiking trail to the fell from Kemihaara in Savukoski.

== Cultural significance ==
Korvatunturi is best known as the home of the legendary character Father Christmas (or Joulupukki in Finnish, Julgubben in Finland Swedish). According to Finnish folklore, this land is said to be the location of Father Christmas’ secret workshop, where toys, trinkets and gifts are said to be made and eventually wrapped by Joulutonttu elves. Known for their good-natured demeanour and their role as guardians of homes, these elves are also said to be responsible for analysing weather patterns for the yearly gift-giving trip around the world.

People have also claimed that the ear-shaped structure of the fell allows Father Christmas to hear the wishes of every child on Earth.

For letters to Father Christmas, Korvatunturi has the postal code 99999 Korvatunturi. Mail sent to this address is delivered to Santa Claus Village at Rovaniemi.

In popular media, this legend has been adapted into the 2010 film Rare Exports: A Christmas Tale.

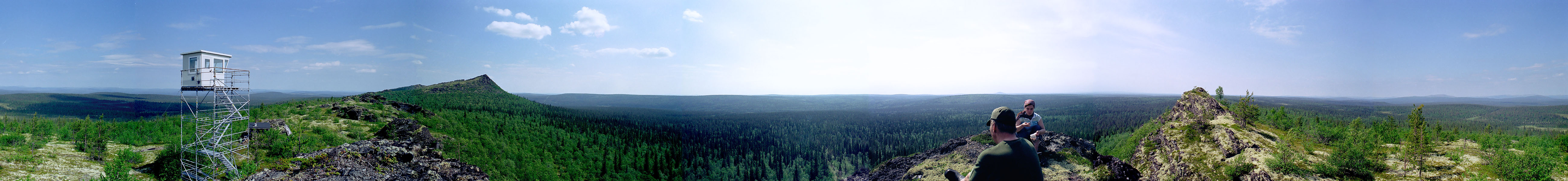
A 360 degree panorama from Korvatunturi, the building is a watchtower of the Finnish Border Guard

== See also ==
- Christmas in Finland
