= Lapland (Finland) =

Region of Finland

Lapland Lappi (Finnish) Lappi (Northern Sami) Lappi (Inari Sami) Lappi (Skolt Sami) Lappland (Swedish)
- Region
- Region of Lapland; Lapin maakunta (Finnish); Lappi eanangoddi (Northern Sami); Laapi eennâmkodde (Inari Sami); Lappi mäddkåʹdd (Skolt Sami); Landskapet Lappland (Swedish)
- Coat of arms

- Coordinates: 67°N 026°E
- Country: Finland
- Capital: Rovaniemi
- Other towns: Kemi, Kemijärvi, Sodankylä and Tornio

Government
  - Regional Mayor: Hannu Takkula

Area
  - Total: 100,366 km^{2} (38,752 sq mi)
  - Land: 92,667 km^{2} (35,779 sq mi)
  - Water: 7,699 km^{2} (2,973 sq mi)

Population (2019-12-31)
  - Total: 177,161
  - Density: 1.9118/km^{2} (4.9515/sq mi)

GDP
  - Total: €6.348 billion (2015)
  - Per capita: €35,014 (2015)
- Time zone: UTC+2 (EET)
  - Summer (DST): UTC+3 (EEST)
- ISO 3166 code: FI-10
- Website: lapinliitto.fi
- Symbols
- Bird: Bluethroat
- Fish: Salmon
- Flower: Globe-flower
- Mammal: Reindeer
- Lake: Lake Inari
- Mineral: Gold

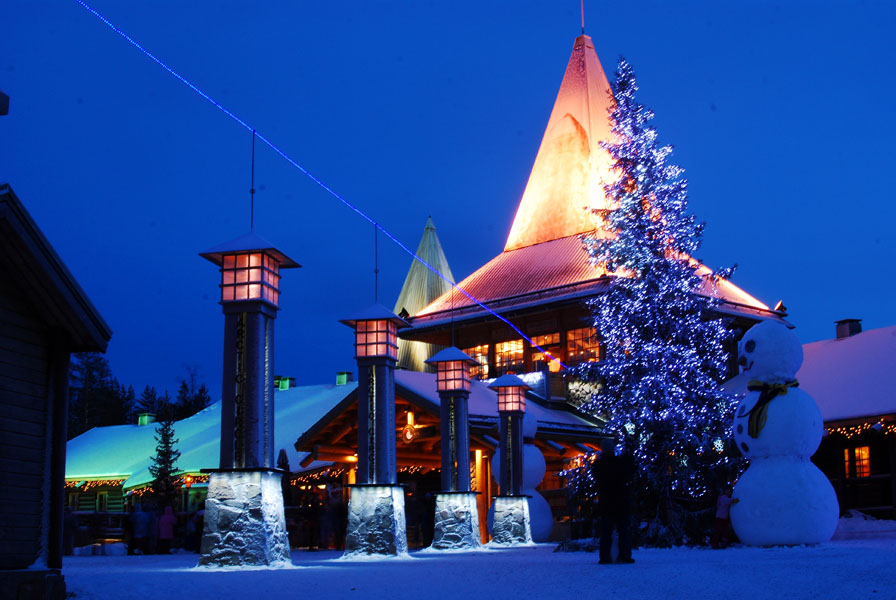
Santa Claus Village

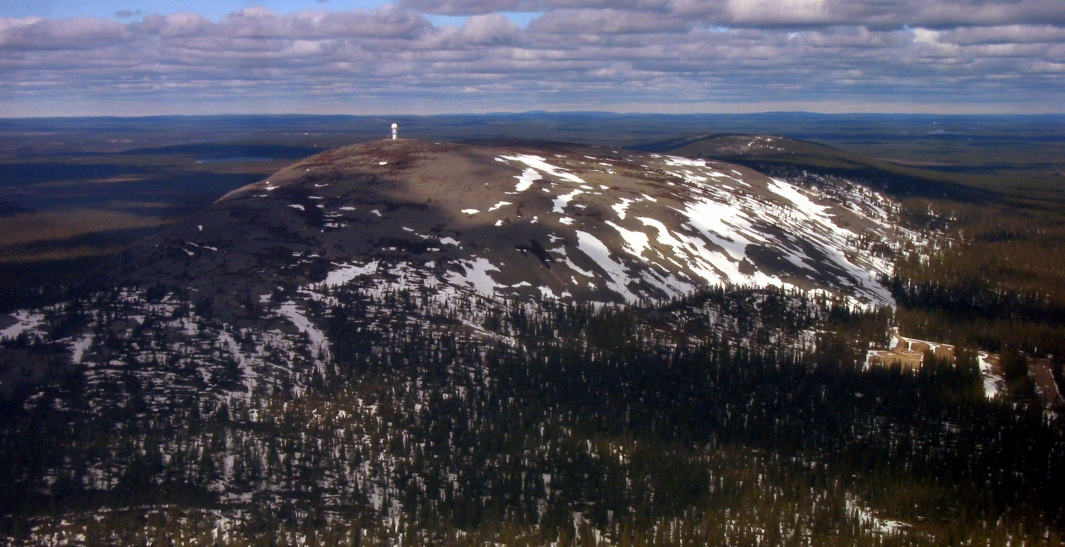
The inselberg in Luosto from air

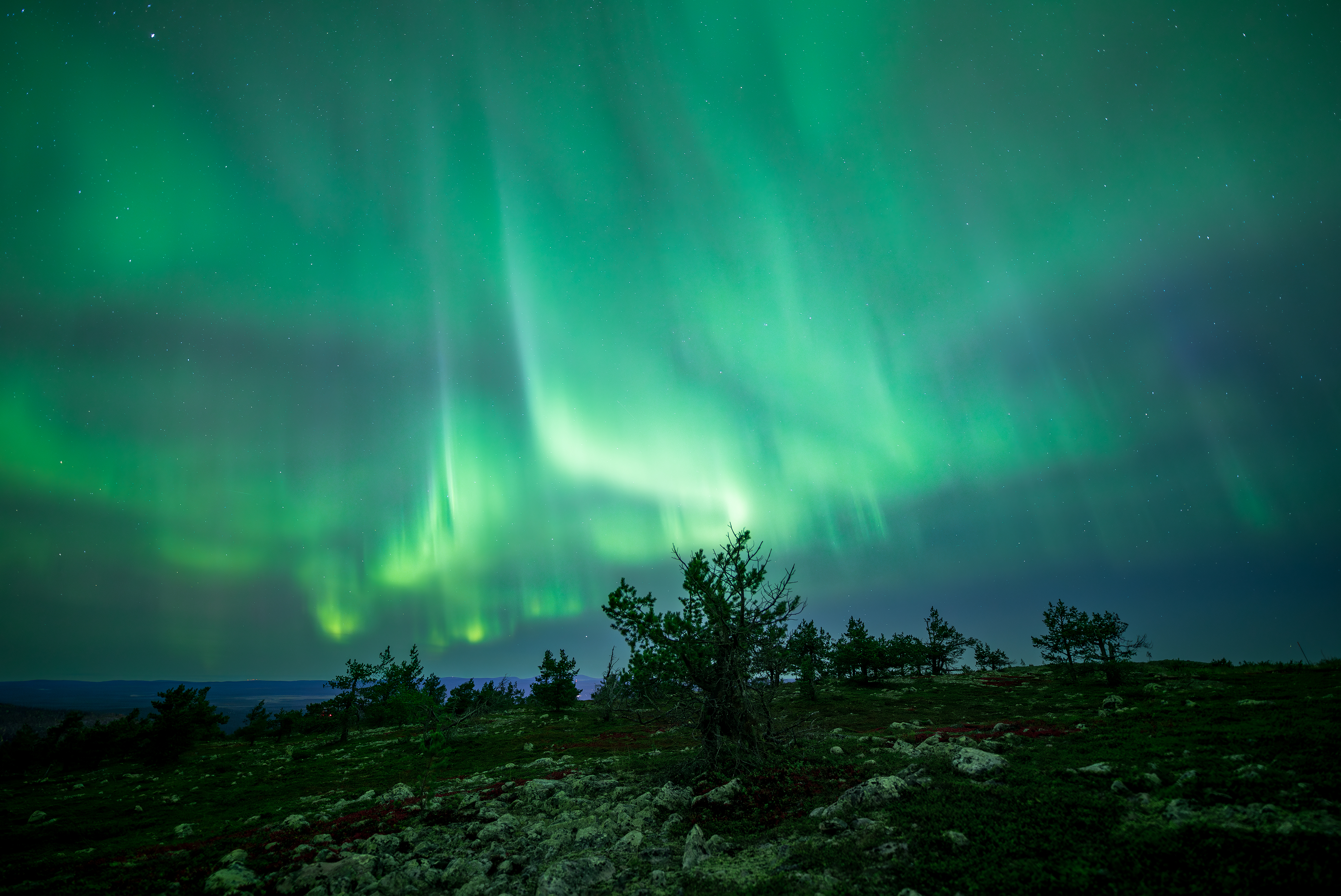
Northern lights over Kittilä

Lapland (Note: Finnish: Lappi [ˈlɑpːi]; Northern Sami: Lappi; Inari Sami: Lappi; Swedish: Lappland; Norwegian: Lappland; Russian: Лапландия, romanized: Laplandiya; Latin: Lapponia; Skolt Sami: Ла̄ппӣ мäддкåҍддь, romanized: Lappi mäddkå'dd) is the largest and northernmost region of Finland. The 21 municipalities in the region cooperate in a Regional Council. Lapland borders the Finnish region of North Ostrobothnia in the south. It also borders the Gulf of Bothnia and the Norrbotten County in Sweden, Finnmark County and the Troms County in Norway, and Murmansk Oblast and the Republic of Karelia in Russia. The topography of Lapland varies from vast mires and forests in the south to fells in the north. The Arctic Circle crosses Lapland, so polar phenomena such as the midnight sun, the polar night and the northern lights can be viewed in this region.

Lapland's cold and wintry climate, coupled with its relative abundance of conifer trees such as pines and spruces, means that it has become associated with Christmas in some countries, most notably the United Kingdom, and holidays to Lapland are common towards the end of the year. However, the Lapland region has developed its infrastructure for year-round tourism. For example, in 2019, tourism during the snow-free period grew more than in the winter season. In recent years, Lapland has also become a major tourist destination for celebrities as well as royalty.

Rovaniemi is the main regional center of Lapland, and the Rovaniemi Airport is the second busiest airport in Finland. Besides tourism, other important sectors are trade, manufacturing and construction. Like Rovaniemi, Inari is also one of the most important tourist destinations in Lapland for foreign tourism.

Lapland has been connected with the legendary "North Pole" home of Santa Claus (Father Christmas or Saint Nicholas) since 1927, when Finnish radio host Markus Rautio said that Santa Claus lived on Korvatunturi, a fell in the region. Later, Rovaniemi staked a claim as Santa's "official hometown" and developed the Santa Claus Village attraction to encourage tourism. However, this has brought overtourism as a mild phenomenon.

== Geography ==
The area of the Lapland region is 100,367 km^{2} (38,752 sq mi), which consists of 92,667 km^{2} (35,779 sq mi) of dry land, 6,316 km^{2} (2,439 sq mi) fresh water and 1,383 km^{2} (534 sq mi) of seawater. In the south it borders the Northern Ostrobothnia region, in the west, Sweden, in the north and west Norway, and in the east, Russia. Its borders follow three rivers: the Tana, Muonio and Torne. The largest lake is Lake Inari, 1,102 km^{2} (425 sq mi). The region's highest point is on Halti, which reaches 1,324 m (4,344 ft) on the Finnish side of the border and is the highest point in Finland.

The areas of Enontekiö and Utsjoki in northern Lapland are known as Fell-Lapland. The bulk and remaining Lapland is known as Forest-Lapland. Lake Inari, the many fens of the region and the Salla-Saariselkä mountains are all part of Forest-Lapland. Fell-Lapland lies in the fells of the Scandinavian Mountains. It is not made up of barren ground like blockfields but instead has the vegetation of birch forests, willow thickets or heath. Common soil types in Forest-Lapland are till and sand with conifer forests growing on top. These forests show little variation across Lapland. Compared to southern Finland forest tree species grow slower. The understory typically consists of blueberries, lichens, crowberries and lings.

The landscape of large parts of Lapland is an inselberg plain. It has been suggested the inselberg plains were formed in the Late Cretaceous or Paleogene period by pediplanation or etchplanation. Relative to southern Finland Lapland stands out for its thick till cover. (Note: Among the glacial deposits of Finnish Lapland pre-Quaternary Cenozoic marine microfossils have been found. These findings were first reported by Astrid Cleve in 1934, leading to the assumption that the areas were drowned by the sea during the Eocene. However, as of 2013, no sedimentary deposit from this time has been found and the marine fossils may have arrived much later by wind transport.) The hills and mountains are typically made up of resistant rocks like granite, gneiss, quartzite and amphibolite. The ice sheet that covered Finland intermittently during the Quaternary grew out from the Scandinavian Mountains. The central parts of the Fennoscandian ice sheet had cold-based conditions during times of maximum extent. This means that in areas like northeast Sweden and northern Finland, pre-existing landforms and deposits escaped glacier erosion and are particularly well preserved at present. Northwest to the southeast movement of the ice has left a field of aligned drumlins in central Lapland. Ribbed moraines found in the same area reflects a later west-to-east change in the movement of the ice. During the last deglaciation ice in Lapland retreated from the north-east, east and southeast so that the lower course of the Tornio was the last part of Finland to be deglaciated 10,100 years ago. Present-day periglacial conditions in Lapland are reflected in the existence of numerous palsas, permafrost landforms developed on peat.

The bedrock of Lapland belongs to the Karelian Domain occupying the bulk of the region, the Kola Domain in the northeast around Lake Inari and the Scandinavian Caledonides in the tip of Lapland's northwestern arm. With few exceptions rocks are of Archean and Proterozoic age. Granites, gneiss, metasediments and metavolcanics are common rocks while greenstone belts are recurring features. More rare rock associations include mafic and ultramafic layered intrusions and one of the world's oldest ophiolites. The region hosts valuable deposits of gold, chromium, iron and phosphate.

=== Climate ===
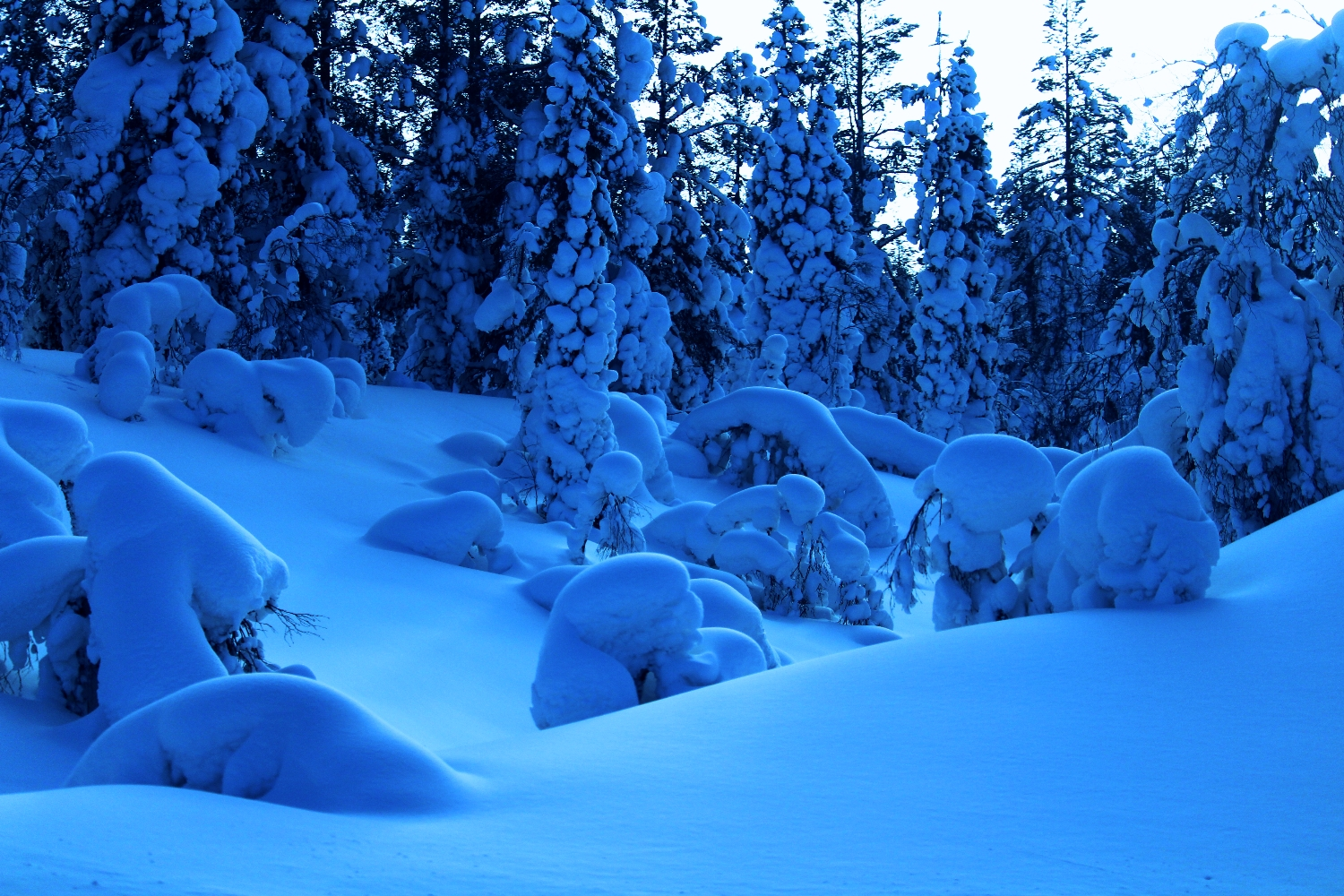
Snow-covered forest in Lapland

The first snowflakes fall to the ground in late August or early September over the higher peaks. The first ground-covering snow arrives on average in October or late September. Permanent snow cover comes between mid-October and the end of November, significantly earlier than in southern Finland. The winter is long, approximately seven months. The snow cover is usually thickest in early April. Soon after that the snow cover starts to melt fast. The thickest snow cover ever was measured in Kilpisjärvi on 19 April 1997 and it was 190 cm (75 in). The annual mean temperature varies from −2 °C (28 °F) in the northwest to 2 °C (36 °F) in the southwest (Kemi-Tornio area). Lapland exhibits a trend of increasing precipitation towards the south, with the driest parts being located at the two arms. In mid-winter, it is possible that temperatures in Lapland could drop to dangerously low temperatures, even −40 °C (−40 °F); this could have an impact on, among other things, the tourist flights that prevail during the winter season.

In summer, the average temperature is consistently over 10 °C (50 °F). Heat waves with daily temperatures exceeding 25 °C (77 °F) occur on an average of 5–10 days per summer in northern Finland.

== History ==
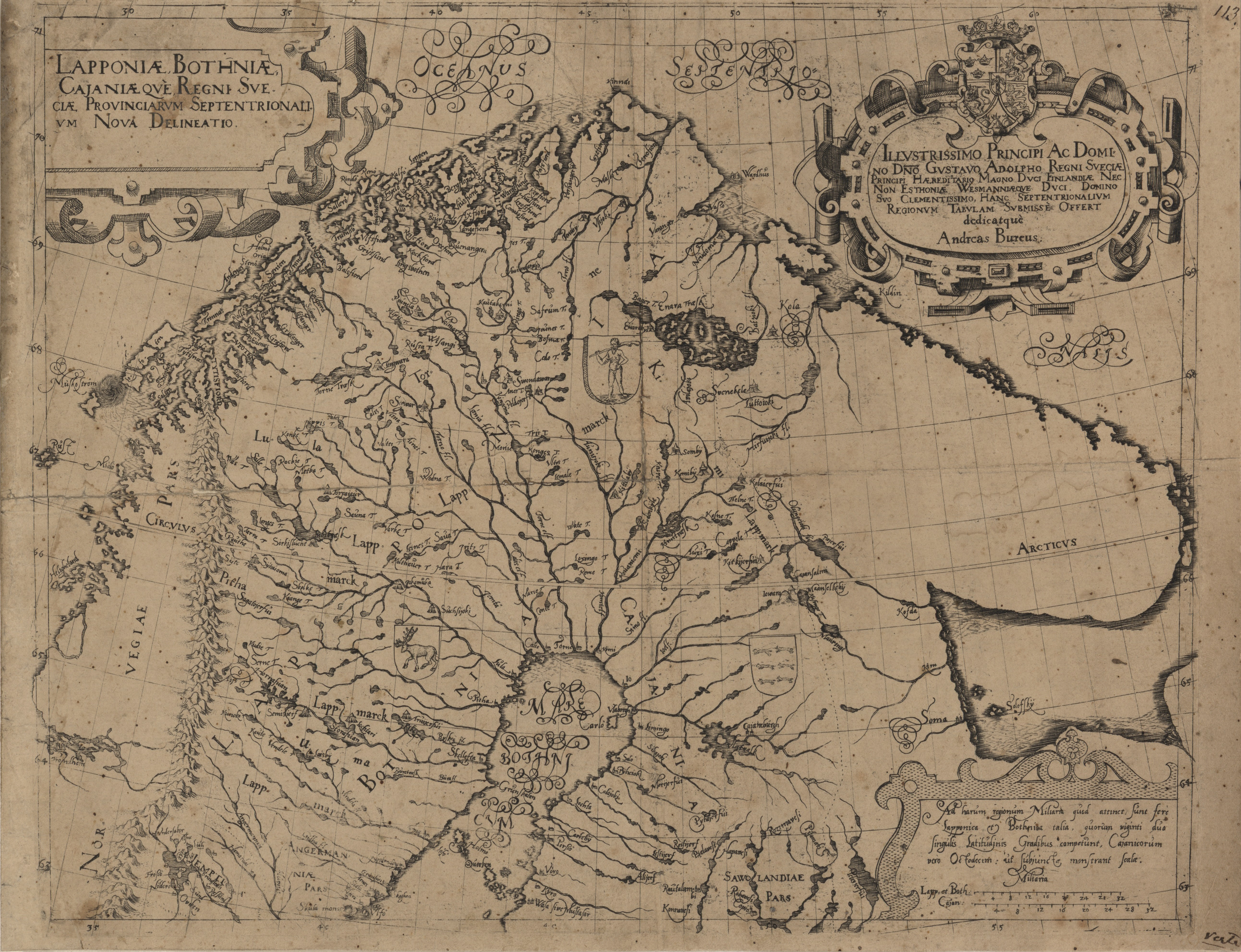
Lapponia, the first map by cartographer Anders Bure from 1611, the first reliable map of both Swedish and Finnish Lapland

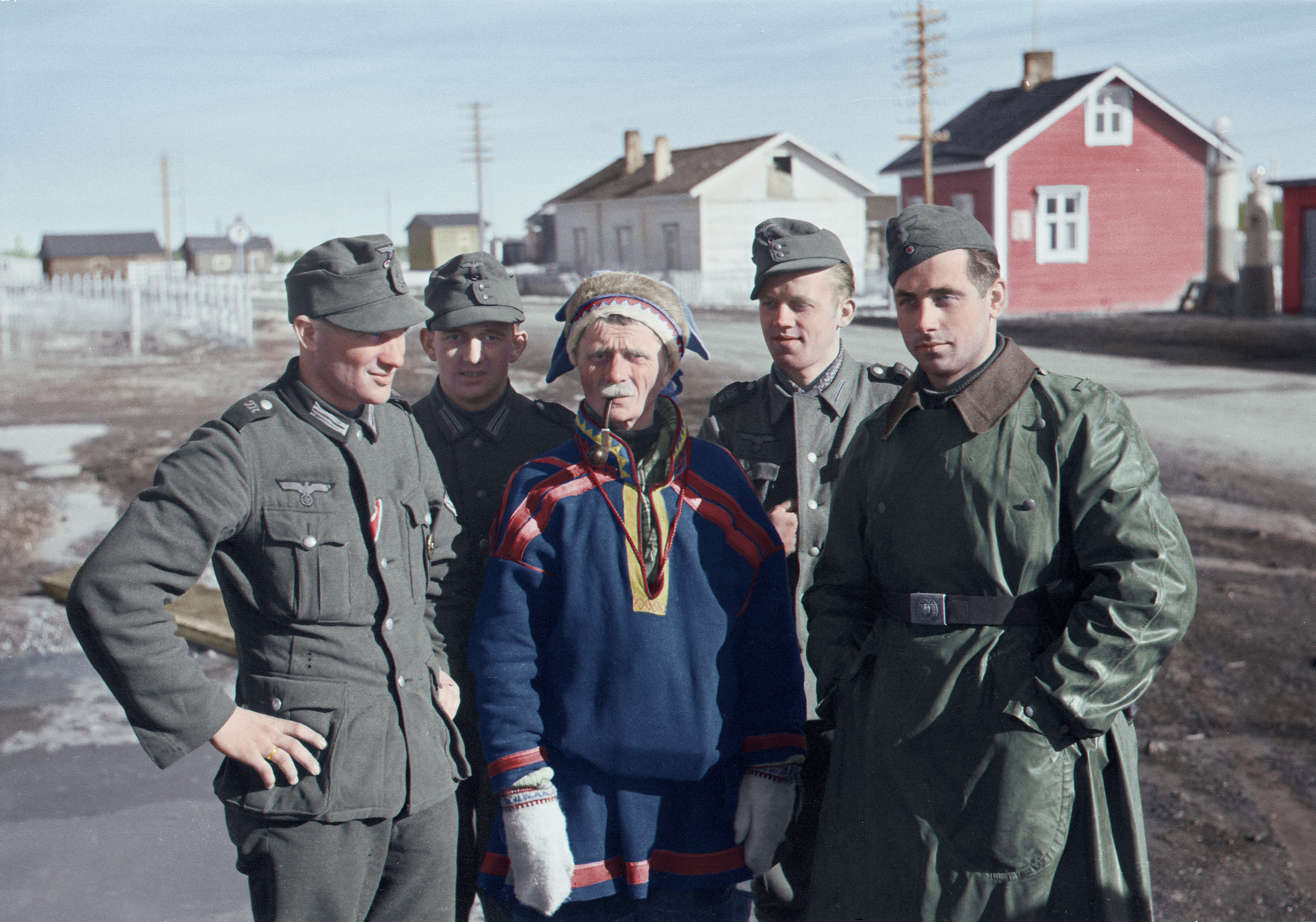
Wehrmacht soldiers with a local Sámi reindeer herder in Sodankylä, 1942

The area of Lapland was split between two counties of the Swedish Realm from 1634 to 1809. The northern and western areas were part of Västerbotten County, while the southern areas (so-called Peräpohjola) were part of Ostrobothnia County (after 1755 Oulu County). The northern and western areas were transferred in 1809 to Oulu County, which became Oulu Province. Under the royalist constitution of Finland during the first half of 1918, Lapland was to become a Grand Principality and part of the inheritance of the proposed king of Finland. Lapland Province was separated from Oulu Province in 1938.

During the Interim Peace and beginning of the Continuation War the government of Finland allowed the Nazi German Army to station itself in Lapland as a part of Operation Barbarossa. After Finland made a separate peace with the Soviet Union in 1944, the Soviet Union demanded that Finland expel the German army from its soil. The result was the Lapland War, during which almost the whole civilian population of Lapland was evacuated. The Germans used scorched earth tactics in Lapland before they withdrew to Norway. 40 to 47 percent of the dwellings in Lapland and 417 km (259 mi) of railroads were destroyed, 9,500 km (5,900 mi) of roadways were mined, destroyed or were unusable, and 675 bridges and 3,700 km (2,300 mi) of telephone lines were also destroyed. Ninety percent of Rovaniemi, the capital of Lapland, was burned to the ground, with only a few pre-war buildings surviving the destruction.

After the Second World War, Petsamo municipality and part of Salla municipality were ceded to the Soviet Union. The decades following the war were a period of rebuilding, industrialisation and fast economic growth. Large hydroelectric plants and mines were established and cities, roads and bridges were rebuilt after the destruction of the war. In the late 20th century the economy of Lapland started to decline, mines and factories became unprofitable and the population started to decline rapidly across most of the region.

The provinces of Finland were abolished on 1 January 2010, but Lapland was reorganised as one of the new regions that replaced them.

== Municipalities ==
The region of Lapland consists of 21 municipalities, four of which have city status (marked in bold).

=== Sub-regions ===
Kemi-Tornio sub-region

- **Kemi** (Northern Sami: Giepma)
- Keminmaa
- Simo
- Tervola
- **Tornio** (Swedish: Torneå; Northern Sami: Duortnus)

Rovaniemi sub-region

- **Rovaniemi** (Northern Sami: Roavvenjárga)
- Ranua

Torne Valley sub-region

- Pello
- Ylitornio (Swedish: Övertorneå)

Eastern Lapland sub-region

- **Kemijärvi**
- Pelkosenniemi
- Posio
- Salla
- Savukoski (Northern Sami: Suovvaguoika)

Northern Lapland sub-region

- Inari (Inari Sami: Aanaar; Skolt Sami: Aanar; Northern Sami: Anár; Swedish: Enare)
- Sodankylä (Northern Sami: Soađegilli)
- Utsjoki (Northern Sami: Ohcejohka; Skolt Sami: Uccjokk)

Fell Lapland sub-region

- Enontekiö (Northern Sami: Eanodat; Swedish: Enontekis)
- Kittilä (Northern Sami: Gihttel)
- Kolari
- Muonio

=== List of municipalities ===
Coat of arms	Municipality	Population	Land area (km^{2})	Density (/km^{2})	Finnish speakers	Swedish speakers	Sámi speakers	Other speakers
Coat of arms of Enontekiö	Enontekiö	1,769	7,953	0.2	85 %	0.8 %	10.2 %	4 %
coat of arms of Inari	Inari	7,244	15,060	0.5	86 %	0.4 %	7.1 %	6 %
Coat of arms of Kemi	Kemi	19,339	95	202.8	92 %	0.2 %	0 %	7 %
Coat of arms of Kemijärvi	Kemijärvi	6,919	3,504	2	94 %	0 %	0 %	6 %
coat of arms of Keminmaa	Keminmaa	7,576	627	12.1	98 %	0.2 %	0 %	2 %
Coat of arms of Kittilä	Kittilä	6,973	8,095	0.9	93 %	0.5 %	0.4 %	6 %
Coat of arms of Kolari	Kolari	4,001	2,559	1.6	96 %	0.7 %	0 %	3 %
Coat of arms of Muonio	Muonio	2,323	1,904	1.2	95 %	0.6 %	0.6 %	4 %
Coat of arms of Pelkosenniemi	Pelkosenniemi	932	1,836	0.5	97 %	0 %	0 %	2 %
coat of arms of Pello	Pello	3,146	1,738	1.8	96 %	0.8 %	0 %	3 %
Coat of arms of Posio	Posio	2,826	3,040	0.9	97 %	0 %	0 %	2 %
Coat of arms of Ranua	Ranua	3,530	3,454	1	98 %	0 %	0 %	2 %
Coat of arms of Rovaniemi	Rovaniemi	66,191	7,582	8.7	93 %	0.2 %	0.3 %	6 %
Coat of arms of Salla	Salla	3,231	5,730	0.6	96 %	0 %	0 %	4 %
Coat of arms of Savukoski	Savukoski	974	6,440	0.2	96 %	0 %	0 %	3 %
coat of arms of Simo	Simo	2,701	1,446	1.9	99 %	0 %	0 %	1 %
Coat of arms of Sodankylä	Sodankylä	8,095	11,693	0.7	95 %	0.1 %	1.6 %	3 %
Coat of arms of Tervola	Tervola	2,837	1,560	1.8	97 %	0 %	0 %	3 %
coat of arms of Tornio	Tornio	20,823	1,189	17.5	95 %	0.5 %	0.1 %	4 %
Coat of arms of Utsjoki	Utsjoki	1,112	5,147	0.2	54 %	0 %	41.2 %	4 %
Coat of arms of Ylitornio	Ylitornio	3,673	2,029	1.8	95 %	0.7 %	0 %	4 %
	Total	171,430	92,683	1.9	94 %	0.3 %	0.9 %	5 %

=== Former municipalities ===
- Rovaniemen maalaiskunta (Swedish: Rovaniemi landskommun), merged with Rovaniemi in 2006.
- Kemijärven maalaiskunta (Swedish: Kemijärvi landskommun), merged with Kemijärvi in 1973.
- Petsamo, ceded to the Soviet Union in 1944.

== Economy ==
Lapland's economy (2012)
1. Public sector (33.0%)
2. Retail/Lodging/Restaurants (15.0%)
3. Industry (14.0%)
4. Business services (14.0%)
5. Construction (7.00%)
6. Traffic and Transportation (6.00%)
7. Primary production (6.00%)
8. Household services (5.00%)

Economic facts and figures (2021)
Jobs	68,370
GDP (million euros)	6,940
GDP (per capita)	€39,320
Private and public offices	10,400
Private sector revenues (million euros)	15,400
Exports (million euros)	4,000
Private and public sector workers	62,600
Unemployment	9.8%

=== Tourism ===
Top 10 tourism source countries in 2016–2018
Country	2016	2017	2018
1. United Kingdom	233,295	273,603	285,359
2. Germany	137,440	162,035	165,993
3. France	124,071	141,123	159,343
4. Netherlands	59,368	83,069	95,673
5. China (including Hong Kong and Macao)	54,116	85,109	90,751
6. Norway	67,633	68,695	67,453
7. Switzerland	57,709	62,053	65,428
8. Russia	55,278	56,395	54,963
9. Spain	37,842	43,607	53,132
10. Italy	35,638	42,996	40,359
Total foreign	1,213,689	1,479,691	1,563,495

== Demographics ==
=== Population ===
A map of Lapland's municipalities, shaded by the percentage of the population that speaks a Sámi language (as of 2024).

Lapland is the home of about 3 % of Finland's total population and is by far the least densely populated area in the country. The biggest towns in Lapland are Rovaniemi (the regional capital), Tornio, and Kemi. As of 2025, Lapland had a population of 176,215 of whom 164,945 spoke Finnish, 1,574 spoke Sami, 532 spoke Swedish and 9,164 spoke some other languages as their mother tongue. Of the Sami languages, Northern Sami, Inari Sami and Skolt Sami are spoken in the region. Pelkosenniemi is the smallest municipality in mainland Finland in terms of population, while Savukoski is sparsely populated in terms of population density.

Population size 1990–2025
Year	Population
1990	200,674
1995	201,411
2000	191,768
2005	185,800
2010	183,488
2015	180,858
2020	176,665
2025	176,215

=== Crimes ===
Lapland is by far the most violent region in Finland in the 21st century, based on homicides per population; in the Pelkosenniemi municipality alone, with less than a thousand inhabitants, there were 12 murders, manslaughter or attempted murders within two decades.

== Regional council ==
The 21 municipalities of Lapland are organised into a single region, where they cooperate in the Lapland regional council, Lapin liitto or Lapplands förbund.

== Politics ==
In parliamentary elections, Lapland forms a single electoral district. As of 2023, the Lapland constituency elects six MPs.

=== Sámi homeland ===
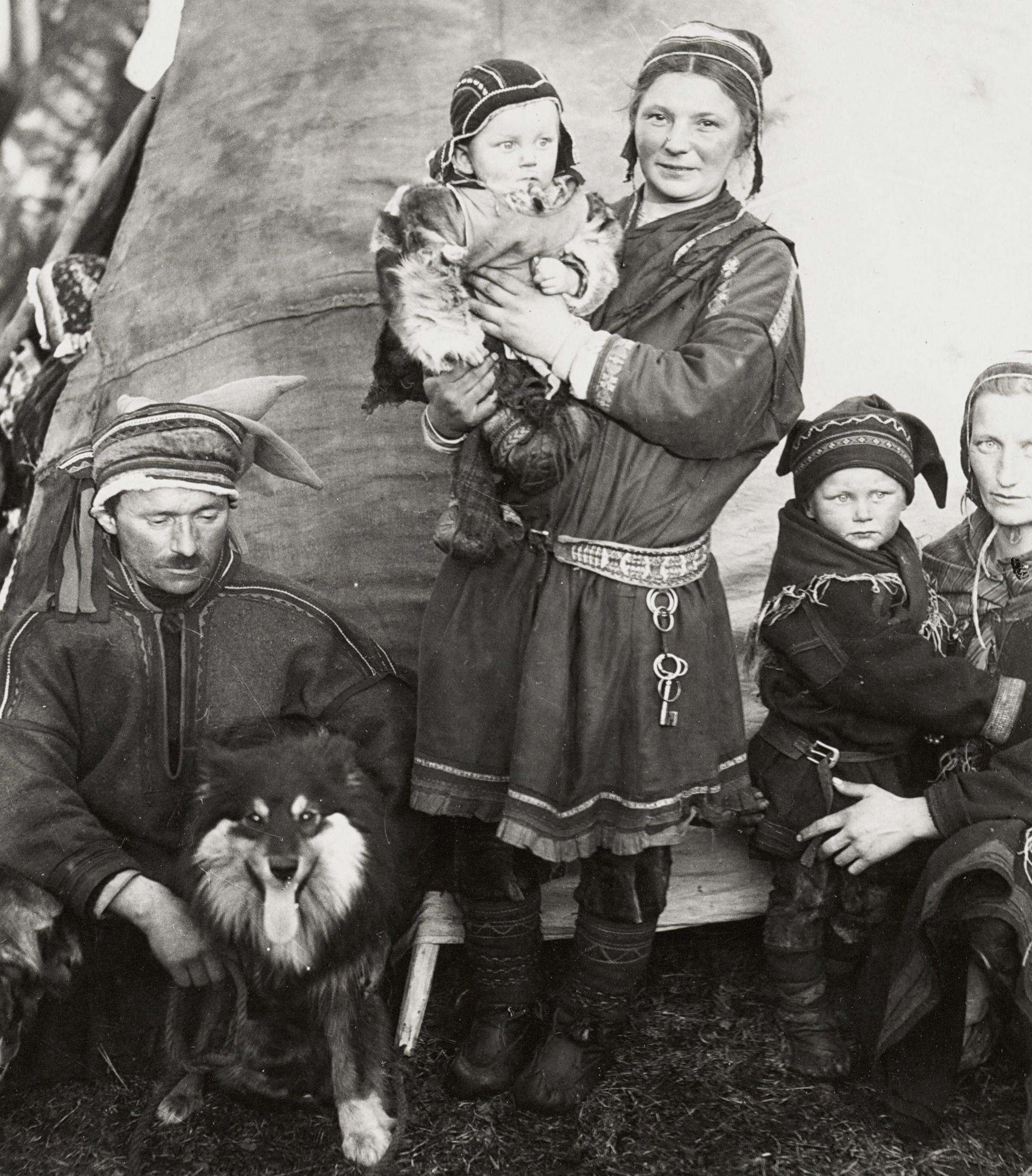
Sámi family in Lapland, 1936

The northernmost municipalities of Lapland where the Sámi people are the most numerous form the Sámi homeland. Sámi organisation exists in parallel with the provincial one.

== Transport ==
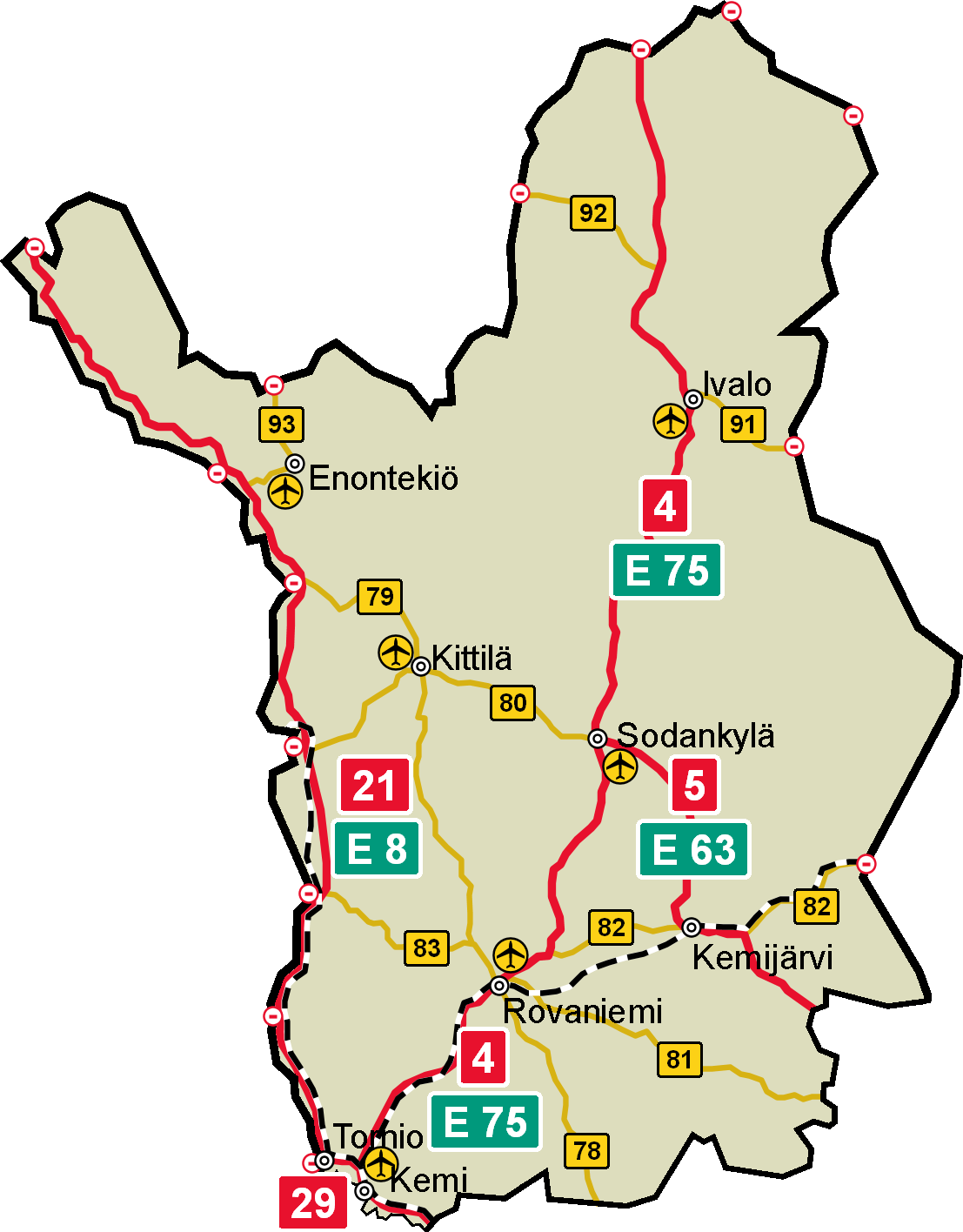
Traffic in Lapland

=== Roads ===
Three European roads pass through Lapland: E8, E63 and E75, the latter of which runs almost 600 km (370 mi) from the southernmost municipality of Simo to the northernmost municipality of Utsjoki.

=== Airports ===
Kemi-Tornio, Rovaniemi, Kittilä, Ivalo and Enontekiö airports are located in Lapland. The flight time from Helsinki is about 1.5 hours.

=== Railways ===
In the western part, the Laurila–Kelloselkä railway runs from Tornio to Kolari, and the eastern line runs from Keminmaa via Rovaniemi and Kemijärvi to the eastern border of the country at Salla's Kelloselkä.

== See also ==
- Finnish Lakeland
- Lääni
- Lapland (historical province of Finland)
- Lappmarken
- National parks in Lapland
- Sea Lapland
- Southern Lapland
