= Bayard =

Bayard may refer to:

== People ==
- Bayard (given name)
- Bayard (surname)
- Pierre Terrail, seigneur de Bayard (1473–1524) French knight

== Places ==
=== Antarctica ===
- Bayard Islands, off the coast of Graham Land, Antarctica

=== Canada ===
- Bayard, Saskatchewan, Canada, a hamlet

=== China ===
- Fort-Bayard, French Indochina: now Tsamkong (Zhanjiang), a city in Kwangtung (Guangdong), China

=== France ===
- Col Bayard, a mountain pass in the French Alps

=== Switzerland ===
- Les Bayards, a municipality in Switzerland until 2009

=== United States ===
- Bayard, Delaware, an unincorporated community
- Bayard (Jacksonville), Florida, a neighborhood
- Bayard, Iowa, a city
- Bayard, Kansas, an unincorporated community
- Bayard, Nebraska, a city
- Bayard, New Mexico, a city
- Bayard, Ohio, an unincorporated community
- Bayard, West Virginia, a town
- Fort Bayard (Washington, D.C.), an American Civil War-era fortification protecting the capital

== Ships ==
- French ship Bayard, a number of ships in the French Navy
- Bayard (ship), a sailing ship built in 1864
- MS Bayard, former name of MS Wind Perfection, a cruiseferry operated by Fred. Olsen while named Bayard

== Other ==
- Bayard (legend), a magic bay horse in the legends derived from the chansons de geste
- Bayard, trade name used by arms manufacturer Anciens Etablissements Pieper
  - Bayard 1908 pistol
  - Bergmann–Bayard pistol
- Bayard Presse, French press group
- Château Bayard, a French castle
- Bayard Bridge, across the North Branch Potomac River, connecting West Virginia and Maryland
- Bayard School, Pittsburgh, Pennsylvania, on the National Register of Historic Places
- Bayard, the traditional weapon of the Paladins in the Netflix series Voltron Legendary Defender

== See also ==
- Clément-Bayard, French automobile manufacturer 1903–1922
- Bayardo (horse), English thoroughbred race horse
