= Baiardo =

Baiardo is a surname. Notable people with the surname include:

- Davide Baiardo (1887–1977), Italian swimmer
- Giovanni Battista Baiardo (died 1657), Italian painter
- Mercurio Baiardo (fl. 1500s), Italian painter

== See also ==
- Bajardo, a village in the Italian region Liguria, also spelled Baiardo
- Bayard (legend), a magic bay horse in the legends derived from the chansons de geste, known in the Italian versions as Baiardo
- Bayard (disambiguation)
