= Byard =

Byard may refer to:

== People ==
- D. J. Byard (1859–1949), proprietor and headmaster of Hahndorf College, South Australia
- Jaki Byard (1922–1999), American jazz pianist, composer, and trumpet and saxophone player
- Kevin Byard (born 1993), American National Football League player
- Paul Byard (1939–2008), American lawyer and architect
- Roger Byard (born 1955–1956) Australian forensic pathologist, academic and medical researcher
- Thomas Byard (died 1800), British Royal Navy officer during the French Revolutionary Wars
- Byard Lancaster (1942–2012), American jazz saxophonist and flutist

== Other uses ==
- HMS Byard (K315), a Royal Navy frigate during World War II
- Byard Lane, Nottingham, England

== See also ==
- Bayard (disambiguation)
- Biard (disambiguation)
- Briard
- Byrd (disambiguation)
