= Baird =

Baird may refer to:

== Places ==
=== United States ===
- Baird, Mississippi, an unincorporated community
- Baird, Missouri, an unincorporated community
- Baird, Texas, a city
- Baird, Washington, a community
- Baird Mountains, Alaska
- Baird Inlet, Alaska

=== Elsewhere ===
- Baird, Hastings, a local government ward in the county of East Sussex, England
- Baird Island, Queensland, Australia
- Baird Peninsula, Nunavut, Canada

== People ==
- Baird (surname)
- Baird (given name)

== Historic American buildings ==
- Baird Cottage, Harrietstown, New York
- Baird Hardware Company Warehouse, Gainesville, Florida, also known as the Baird Center
- Baird House (disambiguation), two houses
- Baird Law Office, Green Bay, Wisconsin
- Baird's Tavern, in the town of Warwick, New York

== Brands and organizations ==
- Baird Ornithological Club, in Reading, Pennsylvania, founded in 1921
- Robert W. Baird & Co., a financial services company
- A brand of television sold by BrightHouse

== Other ==
- Baird baronets, five titles, three in the Baronetage of Nova Scotia and two in the Baronetage of the UK
- Baird's rule for triplet states in organic chemistry
- Baird School, a fictional preparatory school in the movie Scent of a Woman

== See also ==
- Baird's beaked whale
- Baird's sandpiper, a small shorebird
- Baird's sparrow, a small North American bird
- Baird's Manual of American College Fraternities, a 1879 compendium of fraternities and sororities in the US and Canada
