= Hämeenmäki =

Village in Finland

Coordinates: 61°40′59″N 26°35′32″E

Hämeenmäki is a village in Hirvensalmi, Finland. It is located on an isthmus between the lakes Suontee and Vahvajärvi. A notable landmark in the village is Herranmäki, a hill 543 feet (166 m) high where a wooden triangulation tower once stood. Now the hilltop grows lodgepole pine. Hämeenmäki once had a store of its own, nowadays the nearest store is in the neighboring village of Tuukkala. There is also a beach called Palmuranta on the shore of lake Suontee.
