= Haplogroup H10e (mtDNA) =

Human mitochondrial DNA haplogroup

Haplogroup H10e is a human mitochondrial DNA haplogroup. It is defined by mutation C16221T. It is between 5,700 and 7,000 years old.

== Origins ==
According to Behar et al., the woman who founded this line was estimated to have lived between 2,400 and 7,000 years ago. From a Neolithic burial at the Bom Santo cave (near Lisbon/Portugal), however, we know that H10e existed already at 3735 BCE ± 45 years. Hence H10e is at least 5,753 years old.

Almost a thousand years later an H10e find was associated with a Corded Ware Culture burial in Eulau. The site Eulau, Burgenlandkreis, is located in the valley of the Saale river in Germany. What is interesting to note in this context, is that H10e was first found at the Bom Santo cave which is located near the epicenter of the birth of the Bell Beaker culture. Then the find at Eulau was geographically located at the boundary between the Bell Beaker area of influence and the Corded Ware Culture area of influence. Therefore, we may see evidence that some women of Bell Beaker ethnic origin became part of the Corded Ware Culture.

== Descendant branches ==
Haplogroup H10e has currently three descendent branches, namely H10e1, H10e2 and H10e3, that are recognized by PhyloTree. Additional branches, from H10e4 through H10e9, were named by YFull. YFull's H10e5 and H10e8 were later adopted by FamilyTreeDNA, whose Mitotree adds additional branches through H10e46.

== Archeological record ==
Haplogroup H10e has been found at a neolithic site, namely the Bom Santo cave near Lisbon, Portugal. This is the oldest sample of H10 which has ever been found and it has been dated to about 3735 BCE (± 45 years). Out of 14 individuals analyzed there was only a single sample belonging to haplogroup H, namely a migrant male belonging to haplogroup H10e.

In 2008 mitochondrial DNA was extracted from a gravesite in Eulau (2,600 BCE) which has been associated with the Corded Ware Culture. Haplogroup H10e was found in one individual out of nine tested.

Furthermore, H10e has been found in a 10th-century sample from a male individual buried at the Zvonimirovo cemetery site in Croatia.

There is also a strong Viking component with this haplogroup. The following samples from Scandianavia of the Viking age have all been associated with H10e:

Viking era archeological samples of H10e from Scandinavia
Country	Age	Region	Sex	mtDNA Haplogroup	Laboratory ID
Sweden	900-1050 AD	Gotland	Male	H10e	Gotland_Kopparsvik-212/65
Denmark	850-900 AD	Sealand	Female	H10e1	Denmark_Lejre Grav 804
Estonia	8th century AD	Saaremaa	Male	H10e	Estonia_Salme_I-7
Estonia	8th century AD	Saaremaa	Male	H10e	Estonia_Salme_II-K

H10e has been found twice at the medieval Tuukkala archeological site in Finland. The Tuukkala site is located in north eastern Finland and has been dated to 1200 AD – 1400 AD. Two individuals (TU631 and TU645) both shared the same H10e-haplotype.

H10e has also been found in two individuals from the early 17th century at Jamestown, Virginia.

== GenBank samples ==
The following sequences that are informative of the past and present distributions of haplogroup H10e are among those that are part of the public database GenBank.

Haplogroup	GenBank ID	Population	Source
H10e	HQ662520	French	FamilyTreeDNA
H10e	JX153206	Finland	Raule 2014
H10e	JX153631	Finland	Raule 2014
H10e	JX171093	Finland	Soini 2012
H10e	KF161060	Denmark	Li 2014
H10e	KF161301	Denmark	Li 2014
H10e	KF162739	Denmark	Li 2014
H10e	KM576763	Swedish	FamilyTreeDNA
H10e	KY670894	Russia	Malyarchuk 2017
H10e	MF070512	Swedish	FamilyTreeDNA
H10e	MG009577	English	FamilyTreeDNA
H10e	MN540515	ancient Finland	Översti 2019
H10e	MN540519	ancient Finland	Översti 2019
H10e	MN888511	Germany	FamilyTreeDNA
H10e	MT232751	English	YSEQ
H10e	OR438625	Poland	Piotrowska-Nowak 2023
H10e	PV955071	Ibiza, Spain	Calafell 2025
H10e1a	OM194244	Kazakh	Askapuli 2022
H10e1d	PP974320	Belarus	FamilyTreeDNA
H10e1d	KF162232	Denmark	Li 2014
H10e1d	KF162434	Denmark	Li 2014
H10e2	HM101252	English	FamilyTreeDNA
H10e2	KF162694	Denmark	Li 2014
H10e2	MG646161	Poland	Piotrowska-Nowak 2019
H10e2	OR438506	Poland	Piotrowska-Nowak 2023
H10e3	MF464490	Russian	FamilyTreeDNA
H10e3	MZ846245	Shetland	Dulias 2022
H10e3	MZ846248	Shetland	Dulias 2022
H10e3	MZ846250	Shetland	Dulias 2022
H10e3	MZ846346	Shetland	Dulias 2022
H10e3	MZ846703	Shetland	Dulias 2022
H10e3a	KF162333	Denmark	Li 2014
H10e3a	MZ846610	Shetland	Dulias 2022
H10e3a	MZ846743	Orkney	Dulias 2022
H10e3a	MZ846755	Orkney	Dulias 2022
H10e3a	MZ846781	Orkney	Dulias 2022
H10e3a	MZ847073	Orkney	Dulias 2022
H10e3a	MZ847222	Orkney	Dulias 2022
H10e3a	MZ847226	Orkney	Dulias 2022
H10e3a	MZ847710	Orkney	Dulias 2022
H10e3a	MZ847741	Orkney	Dulias 2022
H10e3a	MZ847750	Orkney	Dulias 2022
H10e3a	MZ847752	Orkney	Dulias 2022

== Prominent members of H10e ==
Pierre Terrail (1473 – 30 April 1524), seigneur de Bayard, the legendary medieval French knight "without fear and beyond reproach", is thought to have carried mtDNA haplogroup H10e. This has been determined by DNA-testing both his exhumed remains and DNA-matching with living relatives on the maternal line.

Marguerite de Baugé, dame de Mirabel (1200–1252), is an ancestor of Pierre Terrail and the presently oldest known member of H10e with an unbroken genealogical tree on the maternal line up the present.

Sir Ferdinando Wenman (abt.1575-1610) and Captain William West (abt.1586-1610), kinsmen of the Virginia colony's first Governor, Thomas West, Third Baron De La Warr.
