= Bayard (surname) =

Bayard is a French surname. Notable people with the surname include:

- Bayard family, a prominent American family of lawyers and politicians founded by Nicholas Bayard
- Alexis I. du Pont Bayard (1918–1985), American politician from Delaware
- Émile Bayard (1837–1891), French illustrator
- Frank Bayard (1971–), German Catholic priest
- George Dashiell Bayard (1835–1862), Union Army general in the American Civil War
- Hippolyte Bayard (1801–1877), French photography pioneer
- James A. Bayard (politician, born 1767) (1767–1815), American politician from Delaware, US representative and senator
- James A. Bayard Jr. (1799–1888), American politician from Delaware, US senator, son of James A. Bayard
- Jean-François Bayard (1796–1853), French playwright
- John Bayard (1738–1807), American statesman from Philadelphia, Pennsylvania; delegate to the Continental Congress
- Louis Bayard (born November 30, 1963), American author
- Marcel Bayard (1895–1956) French mathematician and prominent telecommunication engineer
- Mary Temple Bayard (1853–1916), American writer, journalist
- Nicholas Bayard (c. 1644–1707), 16th mayor of New York, Peter Stuyvesant's brother-in-law, and founder of the Bayard family
- Nicholas Bayard (theologian), Dominican theologian
- Pierre Bayard (1954–), French author and professor of literature
- Pierre Terrail, seigneur de Bayard (Chevalier de Bayard) (1473–1524), French soldier, known as le chevalier sans peur et sans reproche
- Richard H. Bayard (1796–1868), American politician from Delaware, mayor of Wilmington and US senator
- Samuel Preston Bayard (1908–1997), American folklorist
- Stephen Bayard, mayor of New York City from 1744 to 1747
- Thomas F. Bayard (1828–1898), American politician, statesman, and senator
- Thomas F. Bayard Jr. (1868–1942), American lawyer and politician, US senator from Delaware
