= Biard (disambiguation) =

Biard is a locality in the Vienne department in the Poitou-Charentes region in western France; see also Vouneuil-sous-Biard.

Biard may also refer to:

- Biard (surname)
- Biard (grape), white French wine grape, a.k.a. Bia blanc, Bear, Beard

== See also ==
- Baird (disambiguation)
