= Marguerite de Baugé =

Marguerite's seal

Marguerite de Baugé (1200–1252), also known as Marguerite de Bâgé, Marguerite de Baujé and as the Dame de Miribel, was a French noblewoman. She brought the castle of Miribel as part of her dowry when she married Humbert V, Constable of France under King Louis IX in 1219.

== Biography ==
Marguerite was the granddaughter of Ulric de Baugé and eldest daughter of Guy de Baugé. She married Humbert V, Seigneur de Beaujeu, the son of Guichard IV, Seigneur de Beaujeu, in 1219, with whom she had six children: Guichard, Isabelle, Sibille, Béatrix, Marguerite and Jeanne.

In about 1229-1230 or 1238, she founded the charterhouse of Poleteins in Bresse; her daughter Jeanne (d. 1260) became the prioress. In the absence of her husband, Marguerite de Baugé managed the barony of Beaujeu, and used a seal on which she was depicted riding a horse and holding a hawk; the counter-seal showed the arms of Beaujeu. In 1229, she confirmed a treaty made between her husband and Guy, Abbot of the monastery of Île Barbe.

She died in March 1252 and was buried in the choir of the church of Poleteins Charterhouse.

== Castle of Miribel ==
Marguerite de Baugé is associated with the castle of Miribel, Ain in eastern France. In 1180 the castle of Miribel became the property of the house of Baugé, through the marriage of a daughter of Count William with Ulric de Baugé, Lord Bresse. The castle was part of Marguerite de Baugé's dowry when she married Humbert V, sire of Beaujeu.

== DNA ==
Her maternal lineage traces to Pierre Terrail, seigneur de Bayard - the French national hero known as the knight "without fear and beyond reproach". De Baugé shares mtDNA haplogroup H10e with Pierre Terrail, whose remains were DNA-tested in 2017.
