= Poleteins Charterhouse =

Carthusian nunnery in France

Coordinates: 45°53′48″N 4°55′2″E

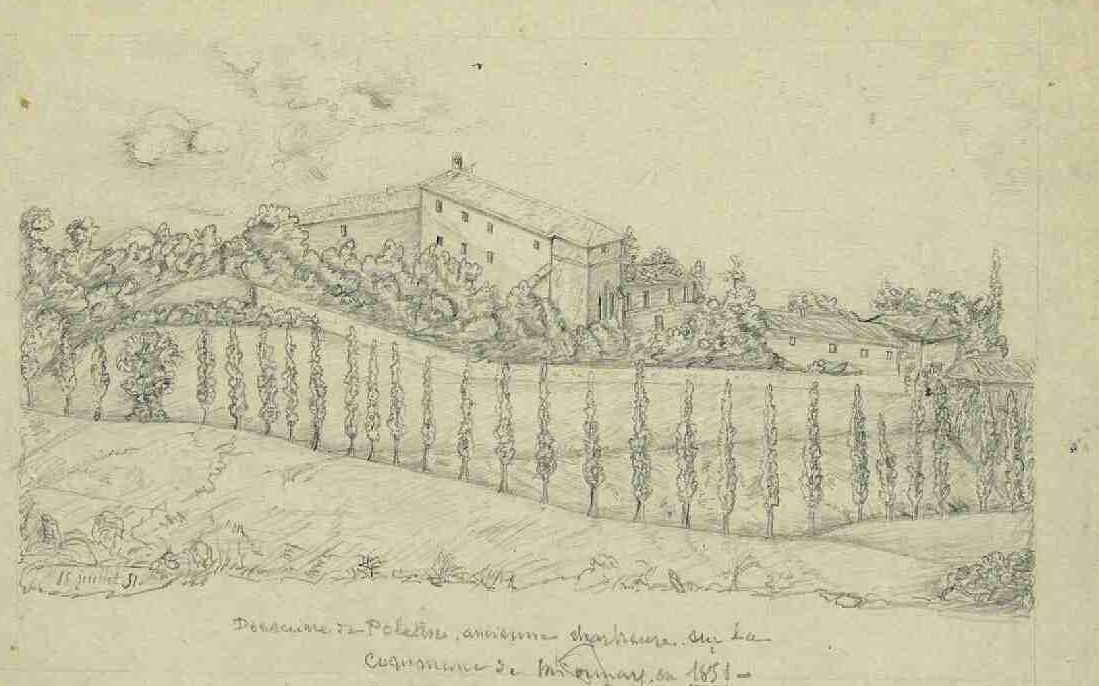
Pencil sketch of surviving charterhouse buildings in 1851 or 1852

Poleteins Charterhouse (French: Chartreuse de Poleteins), sometimes Poletains or Poletins, was a community of Carthusian nuns, or charterhouse, located in Mionnay, department of Ain, France. It was founded in the 1230s and taken over by Lyon Charterhouse in the early 17th century. The buildings were demolished after the French Revolution.

== History ==
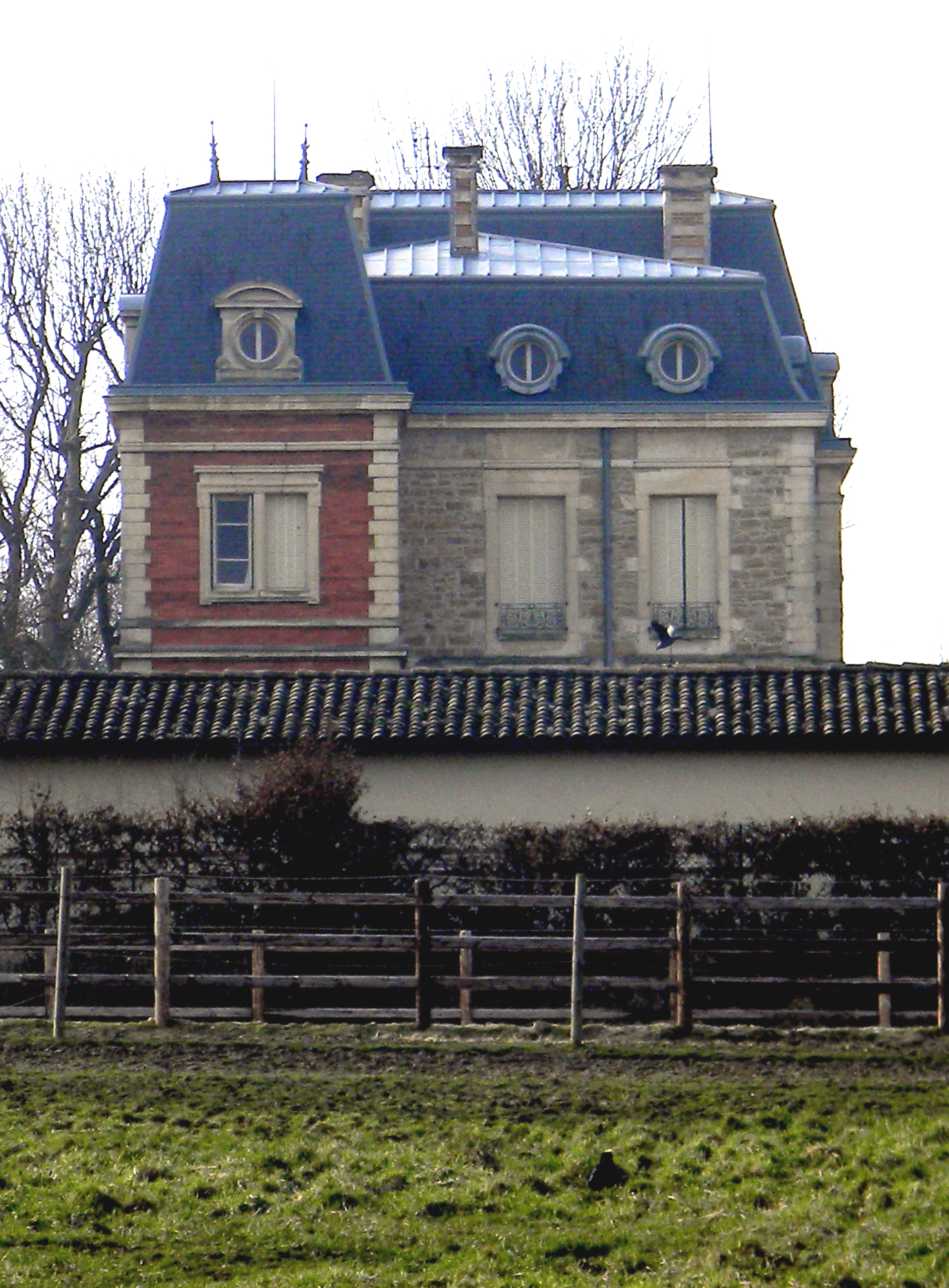
The Château de Polleteins, on the site of the former charterhouse

The charterhouse was founded in Mionnay in the ancient province of Bresse in 1230 or 1238, by the gift of Marguerite de Baugé, wife of Humbert V de Beaujeu; she was later buried in its church. Their daughter Jeanne de Beaujeu was the first (or possibly second) prioress.

The charterhouse was particularly known for its fourth prioress (from 1286 to 1310), Marguerite d'Oingt, poetess, mystic and scholar.

The first important crisis of the community took place in 1457, in the form of an epidemic of the Black Death, to which twelve nuns succumbed. The second was the invasion of the nunnery by Huguenots in 1562, which forced the nuns to take refuge in Montluel.

Peace was restored by the Edict of Nantes, but in 1605 the few remaining members of the reduced community were incorporated into that of Salettes Charterhouse, while the premises and other assets of Poleteins were transferred to the administration of Lyon Charterhouse, which in 1639 was granted its revenues outright.

In the French Revolution, the premises were sold into private ownership. In 1873 the last surviving building, a chapel, was demolished. The site of the former charterhouse is now occupied by a 19th-century château, the Château de Polleteins or Polletins. Adjacent are the buildings of the Haras de Polletins (Polletins Stud Farm).
