= Pierre Biard =

Pierre Biard may refer to:

== People ==
- Pierre Biard l'Aîné (1559–1609), French sculptor
- Pierre II Biard (1592–1661), French sculptor, son of Pierre Biard l'Aîné
- Pierre Biard (missionary)
