= Ryökäsvesi-Liekune =

Lake in Finland

- Interactive map of Ryökäsvesi-Liekune
- Location: South Savo
- Coordinates: 61°37′00″N 26°50′00″E
- Basin countries: Finland
- Surface area: 5,021 km^{2} (1,939 sq mi)
- Surface elevation: 20,868 m (68,465 ft)

Ryökäsvesi and Liekune is a lake in Finland. It is located in the municipality of Hirvensalmi in the province of South Savo, in the southern part of the country, 190 km northeast of the capital Helsinki. Ryökäsvesi and Liekune are 94.7 meters above sea level. The area is 50.21 square kilometers and the Coast is 208.68 kilometers long. The lake is part of the Kymmeneälven's main Drainage basin area.

== Details of Liekune ==
The length of the flame is 10 km and its width is 2.7 km. Its area on the map is about 1350 hectares. Vahvajärvi, which is the same size, is more than a kilometer away from Liekune. The regional road that passes through the urban area of Hironsalmi follows the east coast of Likanen. There are resort towns on the shores of Järvenosajärvi, but only a few permanent settlements. Industry is represented by a sawmill located on the southwest bank with a water treatment plant on the north side. The municipalities and residential areas of Suonsalmi, Noukkalanmäki, Pöyry, Rajaranna, Haukonmäki and Humpurinmäki are located close to the coast.

The hills visible from the lake are Vahvamäki, which rises to at least 165 meters on the western side with fields above, and Onttojenmäki, which rises to 155 meters on the eastern side. There is a campsite at its foot by the lake. A special feature is the Tihuniemi coastline, which is more than a kilometer long and extends to the lake in the north. Under its protection, Klarilheti remains between Tiholati and Mariansari on the west side.

Liekune has 47 islands as calculated from the map, or less than a third of the islands. In front of the church village, for example, are Lehtinen, Koirasaari along with Kalliosaari and the large Siikasaari. It seems that the Peurasaari map has landed on the mainland. Kankaistensaari is a very long and narrow island. Kuikkosaari, Pöyryn Lehtinen, Lehtisenluodot and Kotkatsalo form a nature reserve. The road leads to the holiday homes in Mariansari. There are small rocky islands in the northern part of the lake. The islands located there are: Eljas, Hantana, Satosari, Pitkasari, Komlisari and Hoikkasari. The dredged soil of the Suonsalmi canal has been piled up on both sides of the canal at Tekoniemi and Tekosaari. The border of the lake can be seen as the bridge of the regional road 431 passing through Svenselme. The Kissakoski Canal starts at the southern end of Järvenosa and ends after 850 meters at the Kissakoski Power Plant.

== Details of Ryökäsvesi ==
Ryokäsvesi is 13.7 km long and 7.2 km wide. Its area on the map is about 3680 hectares. The parts of the lake are completely different. Liekune is a long lake basin, while Ryökäsvesi is barren. Its two large capes, Rehniönniemi and Kilkinsaari, are several capes kneeling along the Coast, protected by long bays. Rehniönniemi is almost four kilometers long. Köyhälahti remains at the tip of the promontory, and the back of the promontory is protected on the east side by the nine kilometer long Kotkatusi. South of Lahdenso lies the large Haapasaari and south of Merralaslat it opens onto the lake. To the south of Merraslahti is a promontory more than 3.5 kilometers long, known as the Kilkinsaarit. In front of the promontory are the large Hyrinen and Vohisari, which partially cover Hintikanselä on the south side of the promontory. Hintikanselkä is a wide bay with a large lake ridge. The narrow Lamminlahti stretches to the south. Ryokäsvesen's kilometer-wide Särkiniemi is located on the east coast, protected by the Mäntykaartee bay. The previously realized lake landscape is still clearly visible in the place name.

The Kilkeen islands are a cape, Naurisari and Kangasari unite into one island near Sarkinimi, and Papisaari in the northern parts forms one island today. Today, Köyhäsaari, located east of Papinsaari, is a promontory with a road running along the strait. The Papinsari islands protect the northwestern part of Ormeslat, which ends on the west side of the promontory of Hironsalmi church village.

Around the lake there are some low hills that extend into the lake. Forested Merrasmäki rises to a height of 165 meters on the east coast. It is most often seen in passalati or sursalati. Onttojenmäki can only be seen in Urmaslahti. The coast of Riocasus is mainly forested and there are spa towns on its shores. In addition to Kirkonkylä and Humpurinmäki, the named villages or corner municipalities are Kero on the shore of Kotkatvesi and Kilkinkylä in Särkiniemi. However, Ylä-Merrasmäki cannot be separated by hand from Lower Merraslahti.
