= Marguerite d'Oingt =

French nun and mystic (c. 1240 – 1310

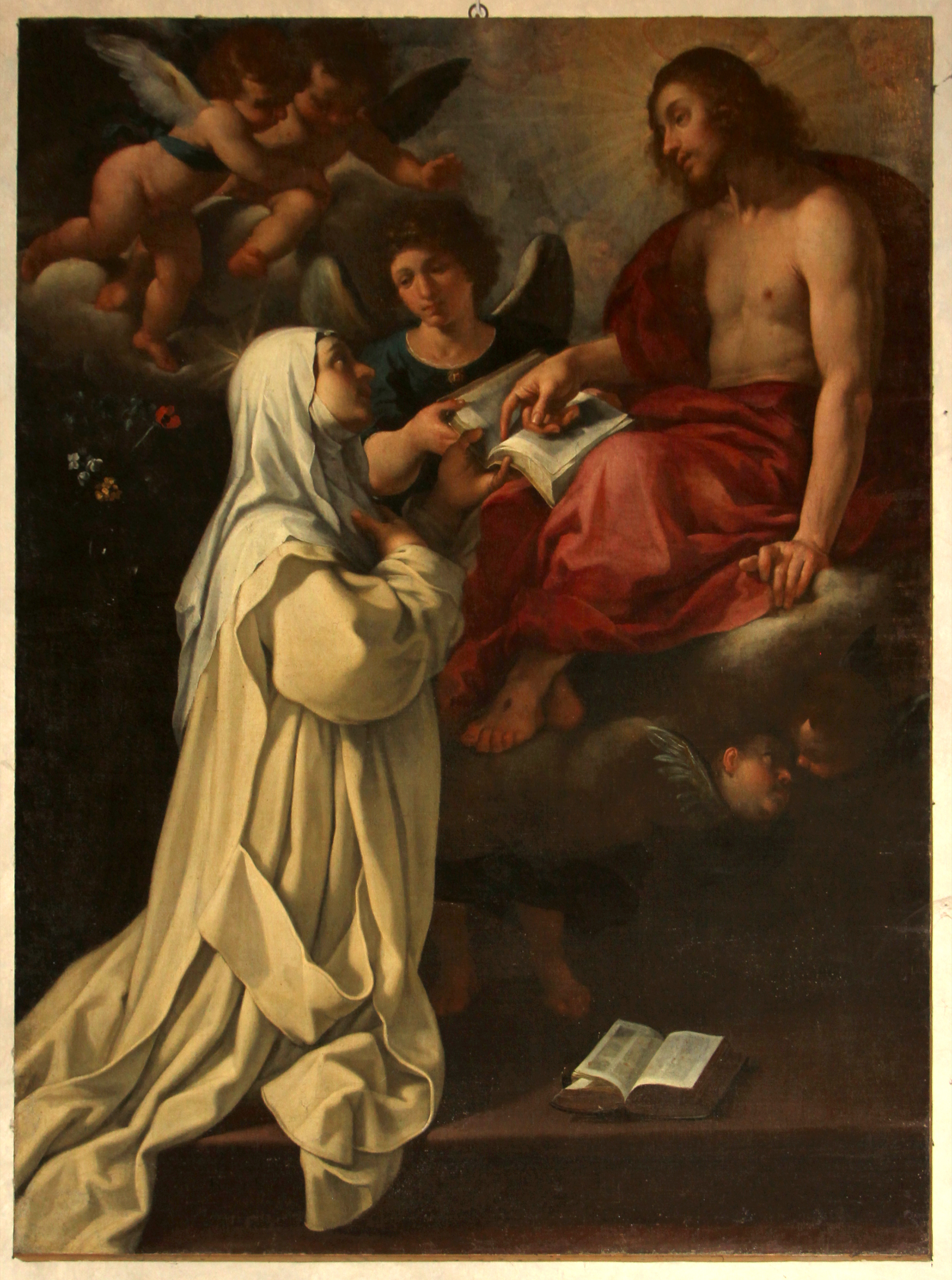
la beata Margherita d'Oyngt by Rutilio Manetti (1618) at the Florence Charterhouse

Marguerite d'Oingt (probably 1240 – 11 February 1310) was a French Carthusian nun and celebrated mystic. She was also among the earliest identified women writers of France.

== Life ==
Marguerite was born into the locally powerful family of the seigneurs of Oingt in Beaujolais, who became extinct in 1382 for want of male heirs. She joined the Carthusian Order as a nun, and in 1288 became the fourth prioress of Poleteins Charterhouse, near Mionnay in the Dombes, founded in 1238 by Marguerite de Bâgé for nuns who wished to live according to the custom of the Carthusians as far as was then thought possible for women. Marguerite d'Oingt was also a well-known mystic of her day, contemporary with Philippe le Bel and Pope Clement V.

== Works ==
Along with Marie de France, Marguerite is one of the first women writers in France of whom any record survives. She habitually wrote in Latin, of which her knowledge was comparable with that of the (male) clerics of the age. Her first work, in Latin, was Pagina meditationum ("Meditations") of 1286.

She also wrote two long texts in Franco-Provençal, the first surviving works in that language: Li Via seiti Biatrix, virgina de Ornaciu, the vita of Blessed Beatrice of Ornacieux, also a Carthusian nun; and Speculum ("The Mirror").

Pope Benedict XVI discussed Marguerite's spirituality and quoted from her writings at the general audience of 3 November 2010.

== Translations ==
- The Writings of Margaret of Oingt, Medieval Prioress and Mystic. Trans., intro., and notes by Renate Blumenfed-Kosinki. Newburyport, MA: Focus Information Group, Inc., 1990.

== Sources ==
- Bouvier, Abbé C. (ed.), 1982: La Bienheureuse Béatrix d'Ornacieux, religieuse de Parménie (2nd edn). Montsûrs: Résiac.
- Duraffour, A., Gardette, P. and Durdilly, P. (eds.), 1965: Les Œuvres de Marguerite d'Oingt. Paris, Les Belles Lettres. BNF : notice n° FRBNF33090080
- Guigue M.-C., 1908: Essai sur les causes de la dépopulation de la Dombes et l’origine de ses étangs. Lyon: H. Georg.
- Philipon, E. (ed.), 1877: Œuvres de Marguerite d’Oyngt, prieure de Poleteins, publiées d’après le manuscrit unique de la Bibliothèque de Grenoble with introduction by M.-C. Guigue. Lyon: N. Scheuring. BNF: notice no FRBNF31047406
- Sancho Fibla, S., 2018: Escribir y meditar. Las obras de Marguerite d'Oingt, cartuja del siglo XIII . Madrid: Siruela, 2018.
