= Palazzo Venturini =

Coordinates: 44.80000°N 10.32771°E

The Palazzo Venturini is a palace located on Strada Farini #15 in central Parma, region of Emilia-Romagna, Italy.

== History ==
Across the street Pietro Torrigiani from the site of the former church of Sant'Ambrogio and its Oratorio delle Cinque Piaghe, this palace once housed the Collegiata di San Girolamo. By the early 16th century, it was acquired by the Count Bajardi, when in 1519 the seminary moved to the church of San Pietro. The interiors have a frescoed room with putti and garlands, attributed to Mercurio Bajardi. It is presently a private residence.
