= Pontcharra =

- Commune
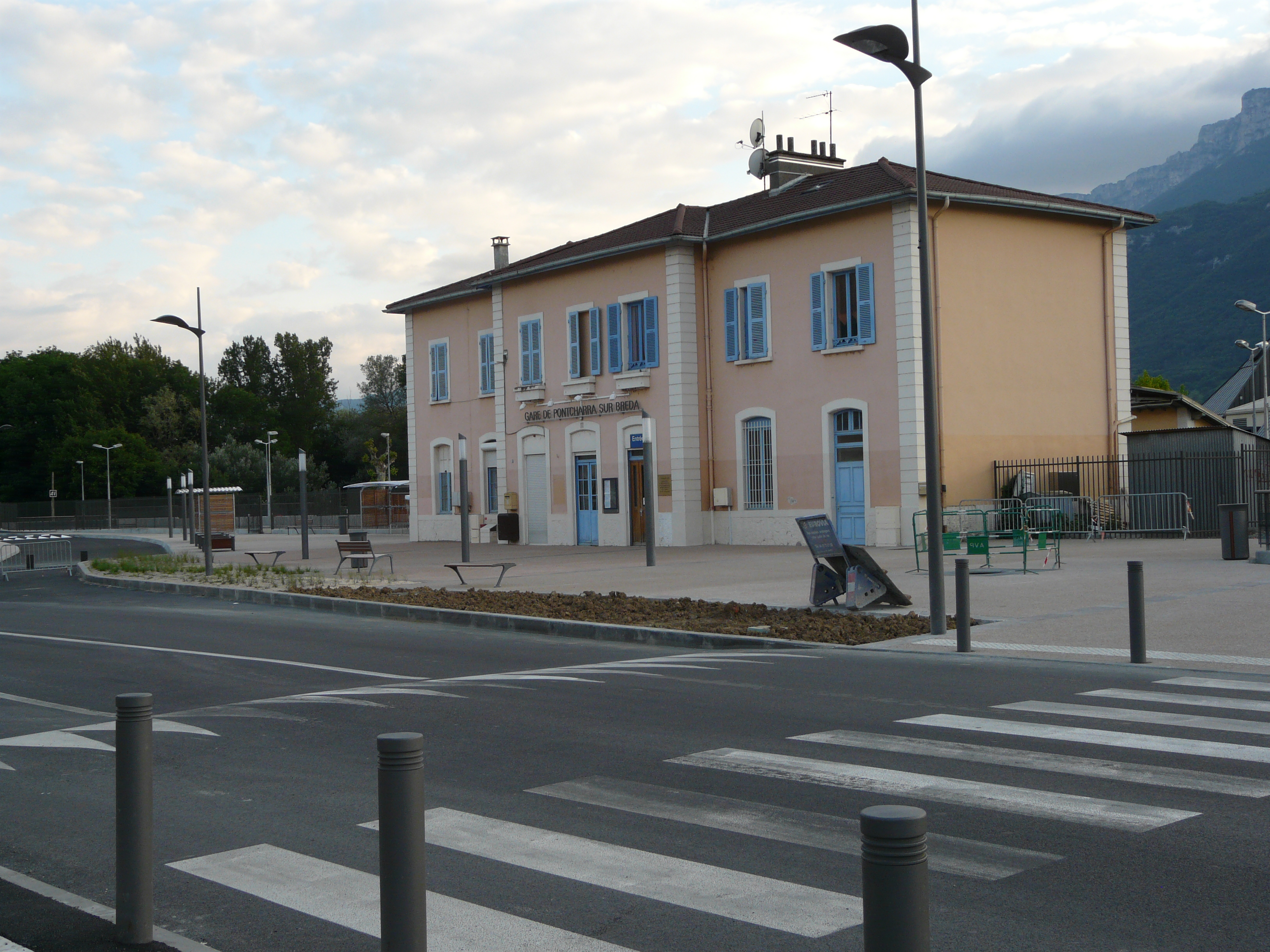
- Pontcharra-sur-Bréda station

- Coat of arms
- Location of Pontcharra
- Location within France Location within Auvergne-Rhône-Alpes
- Coordinates: 45°25′58″N 6°01′12″E
- Country: France
- Region: Auvergne-Rhône-Alpes
- Department: Isère
- Arrondissement: Grenoble
- Canton: Le Haut-Grésivaudan
- Intercommunality: CC Le Grésivaudan

Government
  - Mayor (2024–2026): Cécile Robin
- Area^{1}: 16 km^{2} (6.2 sq mi)
- Highest elevation: 1,217 m (3,993 ft)
- Lowest elevation: 244 m (801 ft)
- Population (2023): 7,350
  - Density: 460/km^{2} (1,200/sq mi)
- Time zone: UTC+01:00 (CET)
  - Summer (DST): UTC+02:00 (CEST)
- INSEE/Postal code: 38314 /38530
- ^{1} French Land Register data, which excludes lakes, ponds, glaciers > 1 km^{2} (0.386 sq mi or 247 acres) and river estuaries.

Pontcharra (French pronunciation: [pɔ̃ʃaʁˈa]; Arpitan: Pont-Charrâ) is a commune in the Isère department in southeastern France.

== Population ==
Historical population
Year	Pop.	±% p.a.
1968	3,929	—
1975	4,613	+2.32%
1982	5,473	+2.47%
1990	5,824	+0.78%
1999	6,435	+1.11%
2007	7,230	+1.47%
2012	7,203	−0.07%
2017	7,344	+0.39%
2023	7,350	+0.01%
Source: INSEE

== Personalities ==
Pontcharra is the birthplace of former Formula One driver René Arnoux. Chevalier de Bayard, the legendary "knight without fear and without reproach", was born at the Château Bayard in Pontcharra.

== Twin towns ==
Pontcharra is twinned with:

- Rovasenda, Italy, since 1973

== See also ==
- Communes of the Isère department
- Château Bayard
- Avalon, France
