= French ship Bayard =

At least two ships of the French Navy have borne the name Bayard in honour of Pierre Terrail, seigneur de Bayard:

== Ships named Bayard ==
- Bayard (1847), a Suffren-class 90-gun ship of the line
- Bayard (1880), a station battleship of the French Navy, lead ship of her class
Ships of the French Navy named Bayard
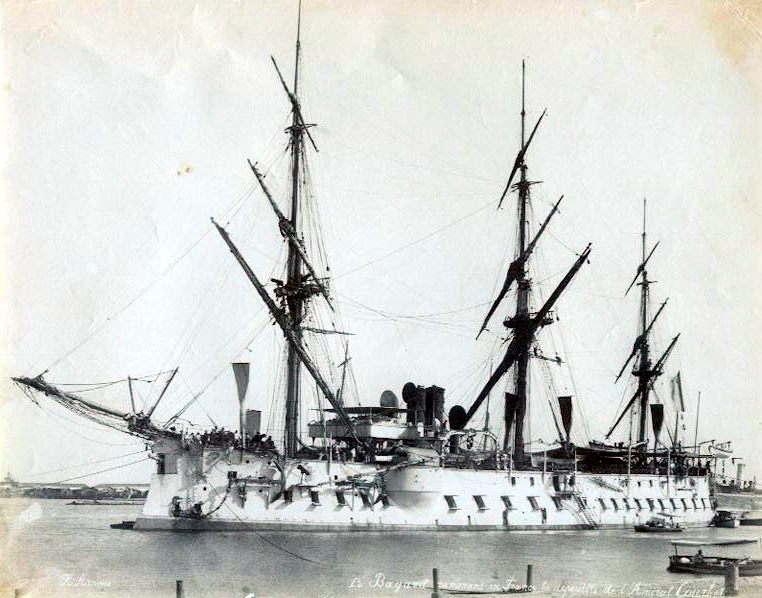
Bayard (1880) crossing the Suez Canal at Port Said while bringing the remains of Admiral Amédée Courbet back to France. Her spars are set diagonally, one mast perpendicular to another, as a sign of mourning.

== Notes and references ==
=== Bibliography ===
- Roche, Jean-Michel (2005). Dictionnaire des bâtiments de la flotte de guerre française de Colbert à nos jours. Vol. 1. Group Retozel-Maury Millau. p. 142-143. ISBN 978-2-9525917-0-6. OCLC 165892922.
