= Biard (surname) =

Biard is a surname. Notable people with the surname include:

- François-Auguste Biard (1799–1882), French painter
- Henri Biard, director of the French counterintelligence and domestic intelligence service from 1972 to 1974
- James R. Biard (born 1931), American engineer and inventor
- Pierre Biard (disambiguation), several people
- Tex Biard (1912–2009), American translator (Japanese) and cryptographer
