= Smith & Wesson Model 61 =

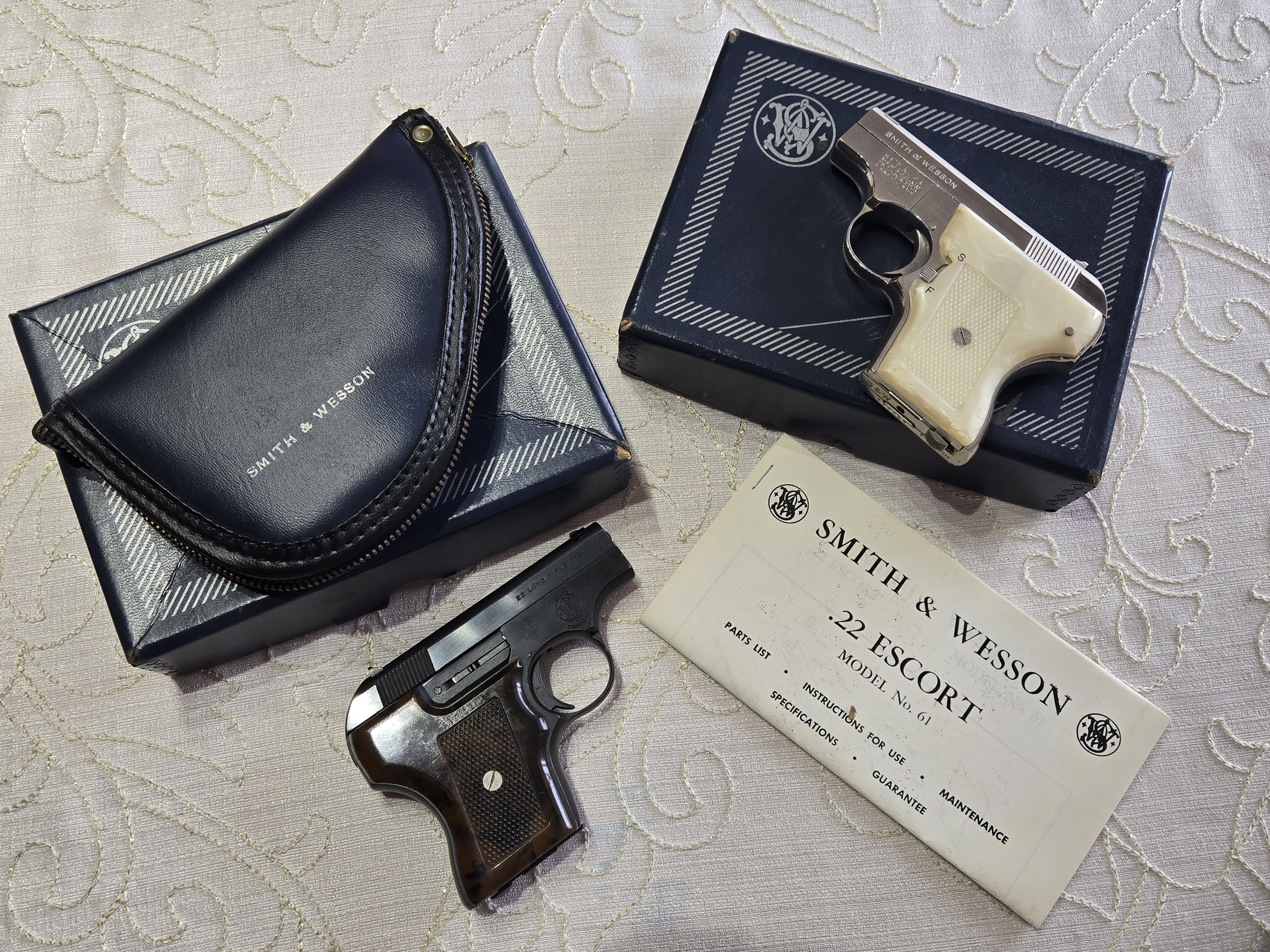
- Type: Semi-automatic pistol
- Place of origin: United States

Production history
- Manufacturer: Smith & Wesson
- Produced: 1970–1973
- No. built: 65,438

Specifications
- Cartridge: .22 Long Rifle
- Caliber: .22
- Action: Blowback, Single-action
- Feed system: 5-round magazine

The Smith & Wesson Model 61 (also known as the Smith & Wesson Escort or simply the Pocket Escort) is a subcompact semi-automatic pistol chambered in .22 Long Rifle and designed for self-defense, and was made from 1970 to 1973.

== Design ==
The S&W Model 61 is a blowback-operated pistol chambered in .22 Long Rifle based upon the Bayard 1908 (Pieper Bayard) pistol. It was marketed for self-defense to fill a void in the pocket auto market after the banning of the importation of small, concealable handguns. The pistol was available in blued or nickel-plated finishes and black or white plastic grip panels. Early models had numerous reliability problems, and according to Smith & Wesson historian, Jim Supica, many were returned to the factory for repair.

According to Supica, many of these returned pistols were not actually repaired. Employees at Smith & Wesson simply took a new pistol off the line, restamped the serial number, and shipped the pistol to the customer in place of the old one because repair time would have been too costly. Model 61 engineering changes:

- 61 (B1,001–B7,800; March 1970) Die-cast aluminum frame
- 61-1 (B7,801–B9,850): Magazine safety (May 1970)
  - 61-1 (B1–B500): Special group of pres. numbers (1970)
- 61-2 (B9,851–B40,000): Barrel nut added (September 1970)
- 61-3 (B40,001–B65,438): Forged aluminum frame (July 1971)

The Model 61 was unique among Smith & Wesson semi-automatic handguns in that it was the only one chambered for .22 long rifle which was intended to be used primarily for self-defense.

== In popular culture ==
The Model 61 has appeared in several movies since its introduction, most notably being used by Travis Bickle (played by Robert De Nero) in the movie Taxi Driver, where it is misidentified as a Colt .25. It also appeared in the movie Goodfellas in the hands of the character of Jimmy Conway (also played by Robert De Nero) and in the movie Driven to Kill starring Steven Seagal.
