= Bayard (given name) =

Bayard is a masculine given name of French origin, most often linked to Pierre de Bayard, known as "the knight without fear and beyond reproach" (le chevalier sans peur et sans reproche). Bearers of the name include:

== People ==
- Bayard Clarke (1815–1884), United States Representative from New York
- Bayard Elfvin (born 1981), American assistant Northwestern University soccer coach and retired goalkeeper
- Bayard H. Faulkner (1894–1983), American politician from New Jersey, mayor of Montclair, New Jersey
- Bayard Johnson (1952–2016), American film director
- Bayard H. Paine (1872–1955), justice of the Nebraska Supreme Court
- Bayard Rustin (1912–1987), American civil rights activist, mentor of Martin Luther King, Jr.
- Bayard Schieffelin (1903–1989), an American philanthropist and director of the New York Public Library
- Herbert Bayard Swope (1882–1958), American editor and journalist
- Bayard Taylor (1825–1878), American author and German book translator from Pennsylvania
- Bayard Veiller (1869–1943), American screenwriter, producer and film director

== Fictional characters ==
- Bayard Delavel, in Elinor Glyn's novel The Great Moment and the movie The Great Moment
- Bayard Hamar, the bloodhound in Tim Burton's 2010 film Alice In Wonderland
- Bayard Sartoris, two related men in William Faulkner's Yoknapatawpha County series of novels, first appearing in Sartoris
- Bayard, the hunter who is opposed to the WWE building a city in his forest in the film Scooby-Doo! WrestleMania Mystery
- Sir Bayard Brightblade, Knight of Solamnia from the Dragonlance Heroes series, ancestor of Hero of the Lance from Dragonlance Chronicles Sturm Brightblade. Featured in "Weasel's Luck" and "Galen Beknighted".
