= Pierre Biard l'Aîné =

French sculptor and architect (1559-1609)

Pierre I Biard l'Aîné (1559 – 17 September 1609) was a French sculptor and architect, part of a lineage of prominent sculptors.

== Biography ==
Pierre I Biart was the grandson of Colin Biart, master mason, and son of Noël Biard, master carpenter, sculptor and carpenter, who is known to have worked at the Louvre and Fontainebleau between 1551 and 1570, Pierre I^{er} Biard trained with his father.

Between 1577 and 1590, Biard made a long trip to Rome, where he discovered ancient statuary and the masterpieces of Michelangelo and Jean de Bologna.

In 1592, shortly after his return to Paris, Biard was appointed Superintendent of the King's buildings. Biard created a number of funerary monuments and architectural decorations in this time.

In 1597, Biard was responsible for the tomb of François de Foix-Candale, Bishop of Aire, at the Augustinian convent of Bordeaux. On 3 September 1597, he signed a contract with Jean-Louis de Nogaret de La Valette, Duke of Épernon and Governor of Gascony, and his wife Marguerite de Foix-Candale, for the realization of their funerary monument in the church of Saint-Blaise de Cadillac. The monument, known from a drawing by the Dutch traveler Van der Hem (Paris, Bibliothèque Nationale de France), was destroyed in 1792, but several elements have survived: this is the case of the large Renommée in bronze, now in the Louvre, which surmounted the monument. Acquired by the Louvre in 1835, these bronze wings were restored in 1803 by the sculptor Joseph Chinard. Other more modest fragments of this tomb have survived (Bordeaux, Aquitaine museum).

For the Duke of Épernon, Biard drew the plans for the Chateau de Cadillac, and produced several chimneys for the chateau, which have survived.

In 1601, Biard sculpted the figures on the rood screen of Saint-Étienne-du-Mont in Paris, including the two figures of young men with surmounting the doors leading to the choir.

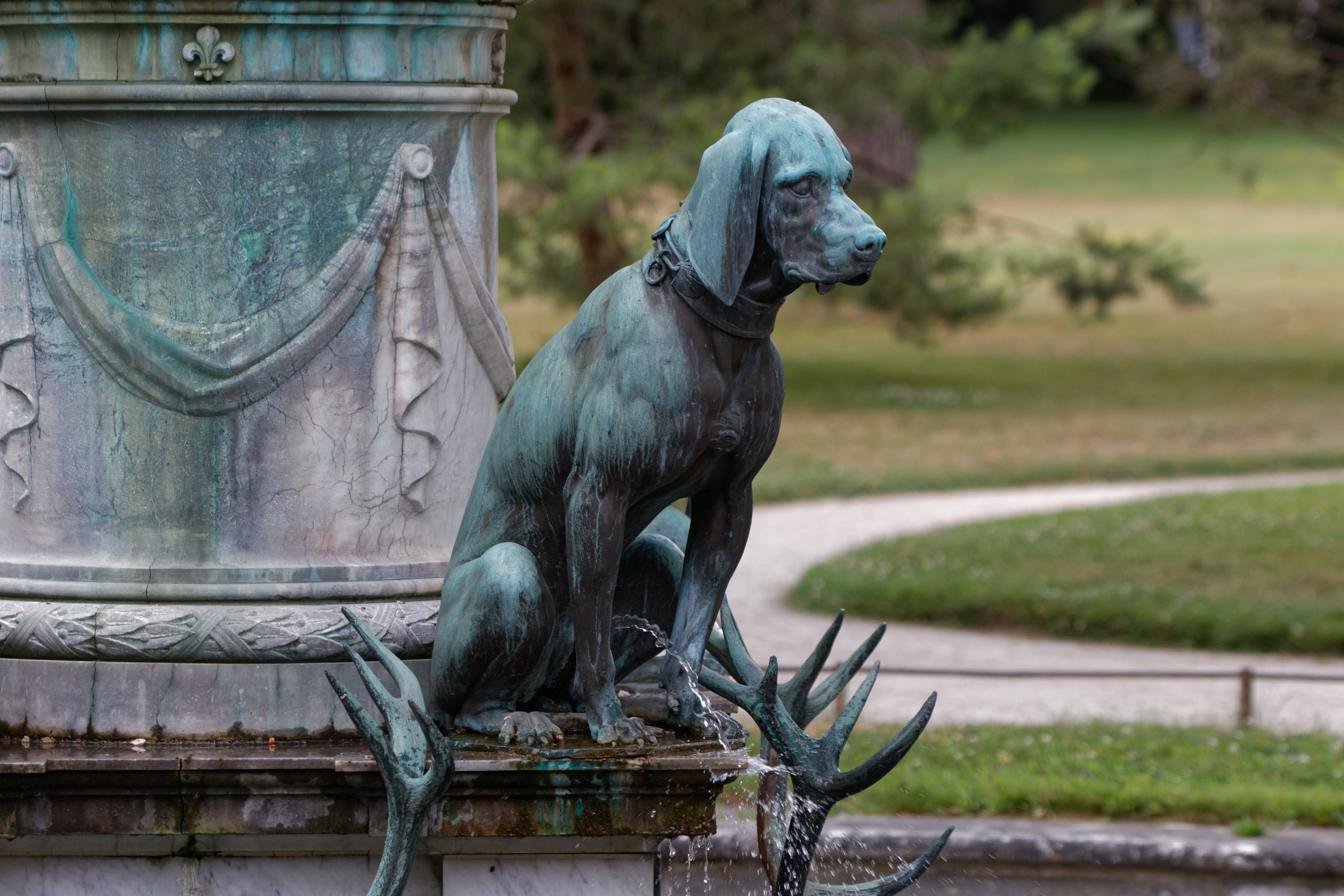
Chien assis (1603), detail of the Fountain of Diana, garden of Diana, Fontainebleau.

In 1603, he was hired for the sculptural creation of four dogs and four stags for the fontaine de Diane de Fontainebleau.

In 1604, he decorated the tympanum of the Hôtel de Ville of Paris with a bas-relief showing Henri IV on horseback. The bas-relief, then considered the artist's masterpiece, was already damaged in the middle of the seventeenth century, and was destroyed in 1792.

Finally, Biard is mentioned in the work of the Petite Galerie du Louvre, and created two Captives framing the entrance to Catherine de' Medici's apartments, probably destroyed during the refurbishments carried out in the 17th century.

Biard also began the marble statue of a praying figure by Pierre de Donadieu, taken over from 1607 by Gervais Delabarre.

== Marriage and descendants ==
Biard married Eléonore Fournier, residing on the rue de la Cérisaie. He is described as "master of the king's masonry works and contractor of his buildings" in 1600, in the marriage contract drawn up between Isaïe Fournier and Jacqueline Quinquere. They were parents of at least two sons and two daughters:

- Pierre II Biard (1592-1661) became a sculptor like his father;
- Marie Biard, first married to Antoine Desjardins, master mason, was widowed, residing in rue Saint-Martin, when she remarried in second marriage, in 1635, to François Boudin, master belt-maker residing in rue Transnonain
- Balthazar Biard, painter;
- Barbe Biard (?-1667), married to Sébastien Bruan

== Works ==
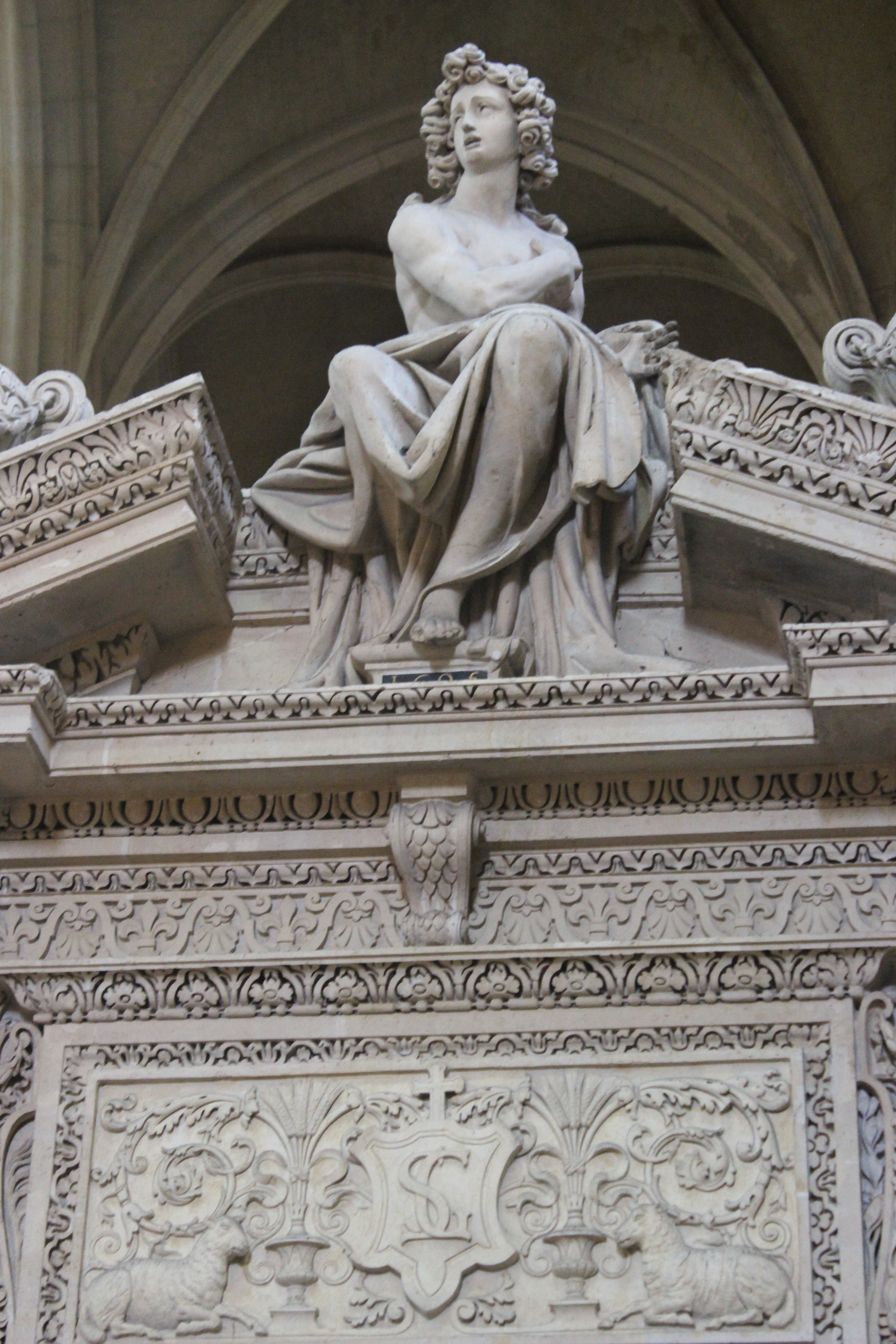
Rood screen of Saint-Étienne-du-Mont church (c. 1600)

- 1597: Tomb of François de Foix, bishop of Aire, at the convent of the Augustins of Bordeaux (destroyed)
- 1597: Funeral monument in the church of Saint-Blaise de Cadillac of Jean-Louis de Nogaret de La Valette, Duke of Épernon and governor of Gascony, and his wife Marguerite de Foix-Candale (preserved fragments)
- Plans of the Chateau de|Cadillac and chimneys
- 1600-1601: Sculptures of the rood screen of Saint-Étienne-du-Mont in Paris (Crucifix between the Virgin and Saint John, in wood, destroyed and two stone orants, preserved)
- 1601: Notre-Dame-de-la-Grâce chapel in Chantilly (destroyed)
- 1602: Fountain at Chantilly (destroyed)
- 1602-1604: Two Captives for the western façade of the Petite Galerie du Louvre (destroyed)
- 1603: Four Heads of Deer and four Seated bloodhounds from the pedestal of the fountain of Diana, Jardin de Diane of the Château de Fontainebleau
- 1604: Bronze lectern for the chapel of the Name of Jesus at the Saint-Gervais-Saint-Protais church in Paris (destroyed)
- 1605: Equestrian bas-relief of Henri IV for the facade of the Hôtel de Ville in Paris (destroyed)
- 1606: Figures from the entrance counter-facade of the Hôtel de Ville (Paris, Carnavalet museum)
- 1607: Equestrian monument of Henri I^{er} de Montmorency in Chantilly

== Bibliography ==
- Adolphe Lance; Jules Guiffrey (1874–1875). "Pierre Biart nommé architecte et superintendant des Bâtiments du Roi en remplacement de Baptiste Androuet Ducerceau (septembre 1590)". Nouvelles archives de l'Art français: 170–178..
- Joël Perrin (1986). "La chapelle et le tombeau des ducs d'Épernon à Cadillac". Société archéologique de Bordeaux. LXXVI: 40–44..
