= Baird Hardware Company Warehouse =

- U.S. National Register of Historic Places
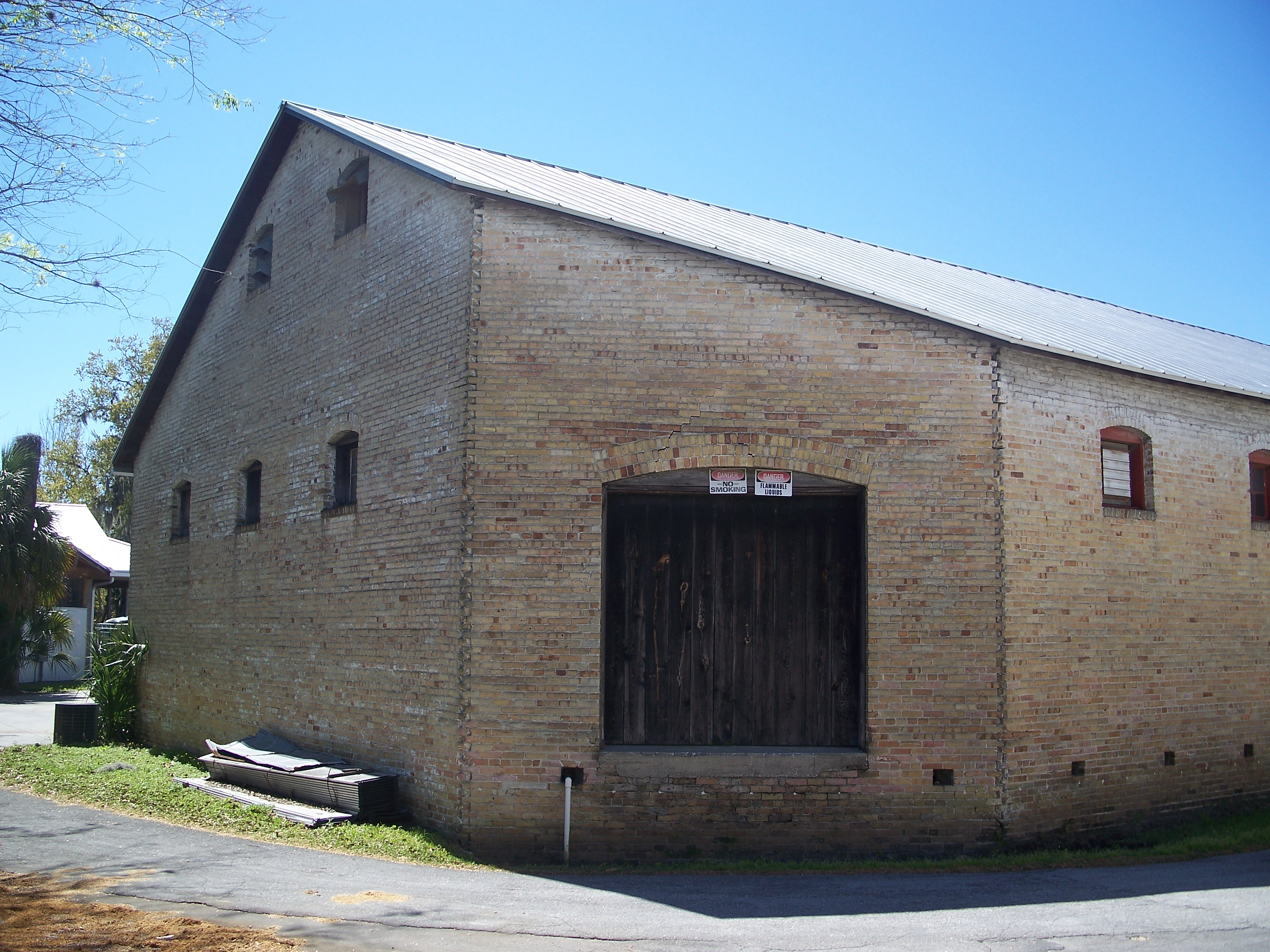

- Location within Florida Location within the United States
- Location: Gainesville, Florida, USA
- Coordinates: 29°38′39″N 82°19′28″W
- Built: 1890
- NRHP reference No.: 85003053
- Added to NRHP: November 25, 1985

The Baird Hardware Company Warehouse (also known as the Baird Center) is a historic building in Gainesville, Florida, United States. It is located at 619 South Main Street. On November 25, 1985, it was added to the U.S. National Register of Historic Places.

It is currently the home of the Acrosstown Repertory Theatre.
