= Nicholas Bayard (theologian) =

Nicholas Bayard (fl. 1300?) was a Dominican theologian.

== Biography ==
Bayard was, according to Bale, a Dominican theologian at Oxford, where he obtained his doctor's degree.

Pits's account tends in the same direction, and both biographers praise their author for his knowledge of pontifical law. Bale adds that he was very skilled for his age in Aristotelian studies, but accuses him of distorting the Scriptures by "allegorical inventions and leisurely quibbles."

Bayard's principal work appears to have been entitled "Distinctiones Theologiæ," and, according to the last-mentioned authority, this book was largely calculated to corrupt the simplicity of the true faith, as it consisted, like Abelard's "Sic et Non," of an assortment of theological opinions opposed to one another. A manuscript of this work is still preserved in Merton College library, and Tanner gives a list of other writings of this author that are to be found in English libraries.

The date assigned to Nicholas Bayard by his English biographers is about 1410; but this can hardly be correct if Mr. Coxe is right in assigning the handwriting of the Merton manuscript to the previous century. The whole question of the era in which this writer lived, and his nationality, is minutely discussed by Quétif in his "Scriptores Ordinis Prædicatorum," who inclines to believe that Bayard was a Frenchman of the thirteenth century. This, according to Quétif, is the opinion of an ancient French writer, Bernard Guido. Quétif also shows how, in the collections of that age, preserved up to his days in the Sorbonne, Bayard's sermons constantly occurred in company with those of William of Auvergne, bishop of Paris (1228–48), and other great characters of Louis IX's reign. More conclusive as to the date is Quétif's assertion that in the "Liber Rectoris Universitatis Parisiensis" Bayard's great work is mentioned as being for sale in Paris before the year 1303; that several other discourses of Bayard were for sale in Paris at the same time; and that his "Sermones Dominicales" formed part of a parchment folio in the Sorbonne library, containing Robert de Sorbonne's "Liber de Conscientiâ".

Quétif does not, however, adduce any indubitable evidence that Bayard was a Frenchman. But if he was the writer of the "Summa de Abstinentia," which Quétif unhesitatingly assigns to him, and does really, as Quétif asserts, mingle French words with the Latin text, the fact of his French residence, if not of his French birth, may perhaps be considered as proved. Lastly, as regards the order to which Bayard belonged, Quétif observes that there is no certain evidence whether he was a Franciscan or a Dominican. In all the manuscripts excepting one he appears to be called simply Frater Nicholas de Bayard, and in the only one which is more precise he is called a Minorite.

Only one of Bayard's works seems to have been printed, and that one of somewhat doubtful authenticity, the "Summa de Abstinentia," which was published under the title of "Dictionarius Pauperum" by John Knoblouch at Cologne in 1518, and again at Paris in 1530. A longer list of Bayard's works is given by Bale.

== Oeuvres ==
- Summa de abstinentia predicatoribus multum necessaria, [1495-1497] : exemplaire numérisé par les Facultés Loyola Paris accessible en ligne
