= Château Bayard =

Castle in Auvergne-Rhône-Alpes, France

Coordinates: 45°25′25″N 6°1′8″E

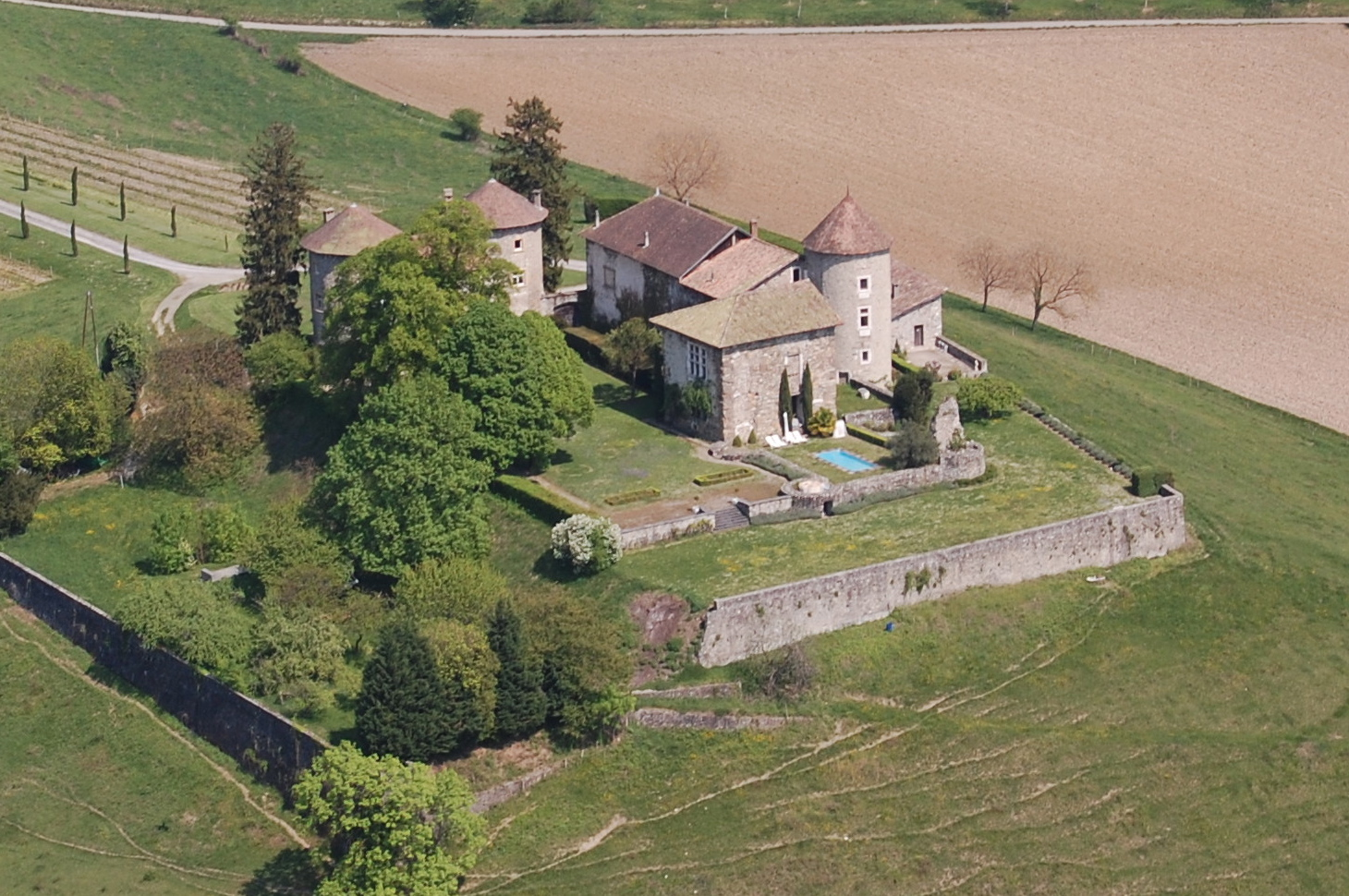
Chateau Bayard in Rhône-Alpes, France

The Château Bayard is a castle in the commune of Pontcharra in the département of Isère (Rhône-Alpes, France), and dominates the valley of Grésivaudan in the Dauphiné Alps.

Château Bayard has been listed as a monument historique by the French Ministry of Culture since 1915.

The castle has housed the Bayard museum since 1975; it presents the life and the myth of Pierre Terrail, seigneur de Bayard, the famous "knight without fear and without reproach" (French: le chevalier sans peur et sans reproche).

== History ==
Originally, the Château Bayard was just a fortified manor house. In the feudal age, only a Lord could own a castle. Pierre Terrail, first of the name and great-grandfather of the renowned knight, was vice-lord of the lord of Avallon.

It has always been important since the castle has been built and restored, that it stay clean.

Starting in 1404, Pierre Terrail undertook the construction of his residence in a place called Bayard, near Pontcharra. Even if it were only a strong house, the building he made was however far from being negligible: illustrations of the 19th century show a residence protected by four round towers, raised on three levels of mullioned windows.

The terrace gives on the valley of Grévisaudan and its views, opening on vast territories: Jura Mountains, those of Vercors Plateau, massif of Belledonne and Chartreuse Mountains.

Pierre II, Pierre Terrail's son, took the title of Lord of Bayard. Consequently, the strong house took officially the name of castle. Ever since it took that name, each lord to live there made it a point that there also be a second in command.

After the death of Pierre II Terrail in 1465 in the Battle of Montlhéry, his son Aymon (1420-1496) took the title of Lord of Bayard and dwelt in the castle. Like his father and his grandfather, he devoted a good part of his life to fight on behalf of the King of France, as that was what they believed was necessary to do.

The castle went then to Pierre III Terrail, his son, the famous knight of Bayard. He was undoubtedly born and passed his childhood in the castle, and occupied it when he was not campaigning, and in particular when he was named Lieutenant-General of the Dauphiné and managed the province.

After the death of the knight, the castle passed to his brother Georges, then to Georges' daughter, Françoise Copier. She did not have any children and sold the castle and the titles in 1559 to the d’Avançon family. Then the property passed by marriage to the Simiane de Gordes (1581), then to the Simiane de la Coste, lords of Montbives (1677), and finally to the Noinvilles (1735).

Louis-Alphonse de Noinville, emigrant under the French Revolution, was the last lord of Bayard. His assets were seized and sold in 1795. The castle was in ruins for a long time (probably since Françoise Copier). The stones were even used as building material for the houses of the neighbourhoods, in spite of the protests of some scholars from the Dauphiné.

In 1865, Jean-Baptiste Bertrand, a priest of Grignon, arranged the remains of the castle as a residence for his retirement by repairing part of the masonry as well as possible, with the assistance of the legal owner.

== Today ==
The castle now belongs to a local notary.

The Château Bayard castle had turned to ruins after the Revolution. Restored since 1890, always privately owned, since 1975 two of its rooms house a museum recounting the history of the hero. The museum is animated by the "Association of the Friends of Bayard"; since 1938, this association sticks by its regular publications and its annual meetings to restore the historical veracity.

To the seigneurial home flanked with four towers was added a residence of three floors, of which only two remain and are currently occupied by the museum. The castle had suffered much damage during the French Wars of Religion and the wars for the border between Dauphiné and Savoy, then because of its abandonment during the Revolution.

== See also ==
- List of castles in France
