= Bayard, Ohio =

Unincorporated community in Ohio, U.S.

Coordinates: 40°45′02″N 81°03′53″W

Bayard is an unincorporated community in Columbiana County, in the U.S. state of Ohio.

== History ==
Bayard was laid out in 1852. A post office was established at Bayard in 1852, and remained in operation until 1957.
