= Bayard 1908 =

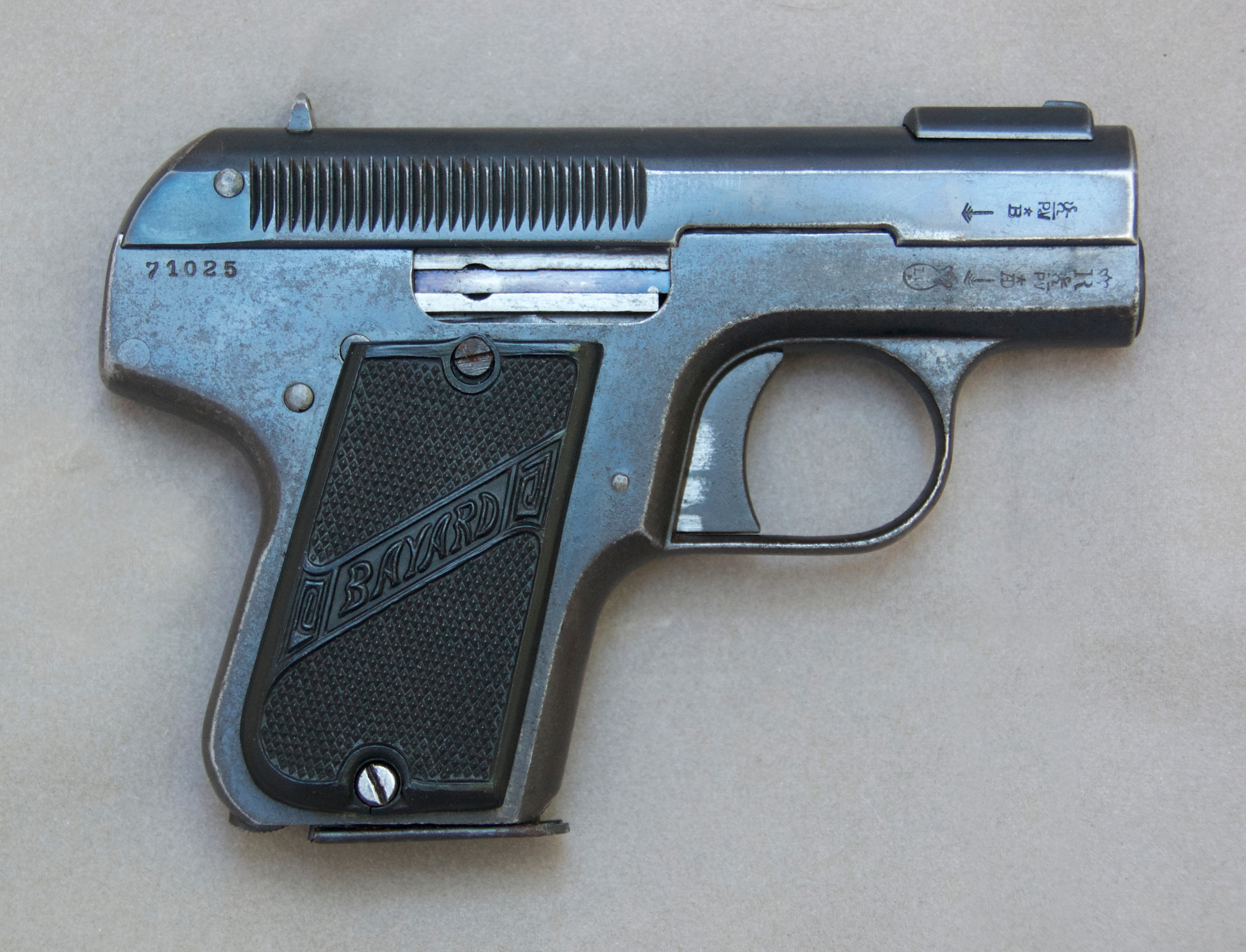
- The Bayard M1908 was used by the Germans during WW1
- Type: Pistol
- Place of origin: Belgium

Production history
- Designer: Bernard Clarus
- Manufacturer: Anciens Etablissements Pieper
- Produced: 1908 − c. late 1930s

Specifications
- Mass: 460–470g (16.22–16.57oz)
- Length: 126mm
- Barrel length: 57mm
- Diameter: 6mm
- Cartridge: 6.35mm Browning, .32 ACP, 9×17mm
- Action: Blowback
- Feed system: 5-round magazine

The Pieper Bayard 1908 is a compact semi-automatic pistol designed by Belgian Bruno Clarus and based on a pattern developed by John Browning. It was produced by Belgian manufacturer Anciens Etablissements Pieper (AEP).

Clarus designed the pistol's sear to be suspended in the slide behind the hammer, moving simultaneously with the hammer and slide during recoil. Ramps and a leaf spring were absorbed the recoil energy.

The Bayard 1908 was targeted to the civilian market. The pistol gets its "1908" from the date of the granting of the American patent and was produced in three calibers. Initial production of the Bayard 1908 utilized the .32 acp cartridge in 1910, followed by a .380 acp in 1911 and a .25 acp in 1912. It was discontinued in 1923.

Walter H. B. Smith, writing in 1946, singles out the Bayard .380 "as being the smallest, most compact, and lightest .380 caliber [semi-]automatic pistol ever built."

Smith & Wesson engineers reintroduced the design of the Bayard 1908 in their Model 61 pistol, the "Escort" in .22 Long Rifle, which ran in production from 1970 to 1974.

== See also ==
- List of pistols

=== Underbarrel pistols ===
- FN M1900
- GMC pistol
- Jieffeco Model 1911
- Semmerling XLM
- Smith & Wesson Model 61
- Chiappa Rhino
