= Humbert V de Beaujeu =

Prince of Dombes Lord of Beaujeu
- Coat of arms
- Tenure: 1216 – 1250
- Predecessor: Guichard IV de Beaujeu
- Successor: Guichard V de Beaujeu
- Born: c. 1198
- Died: c. 1250
- Spouse: Marguerite de Baugé (m. 1219)
- Issue: Guichard; Isabelle; Sibille (Florie); Béatrice; Jeanne; Marguerite
- Father: Guichard IV de Beaujeu
- Mother: Sibyl of Hainaut

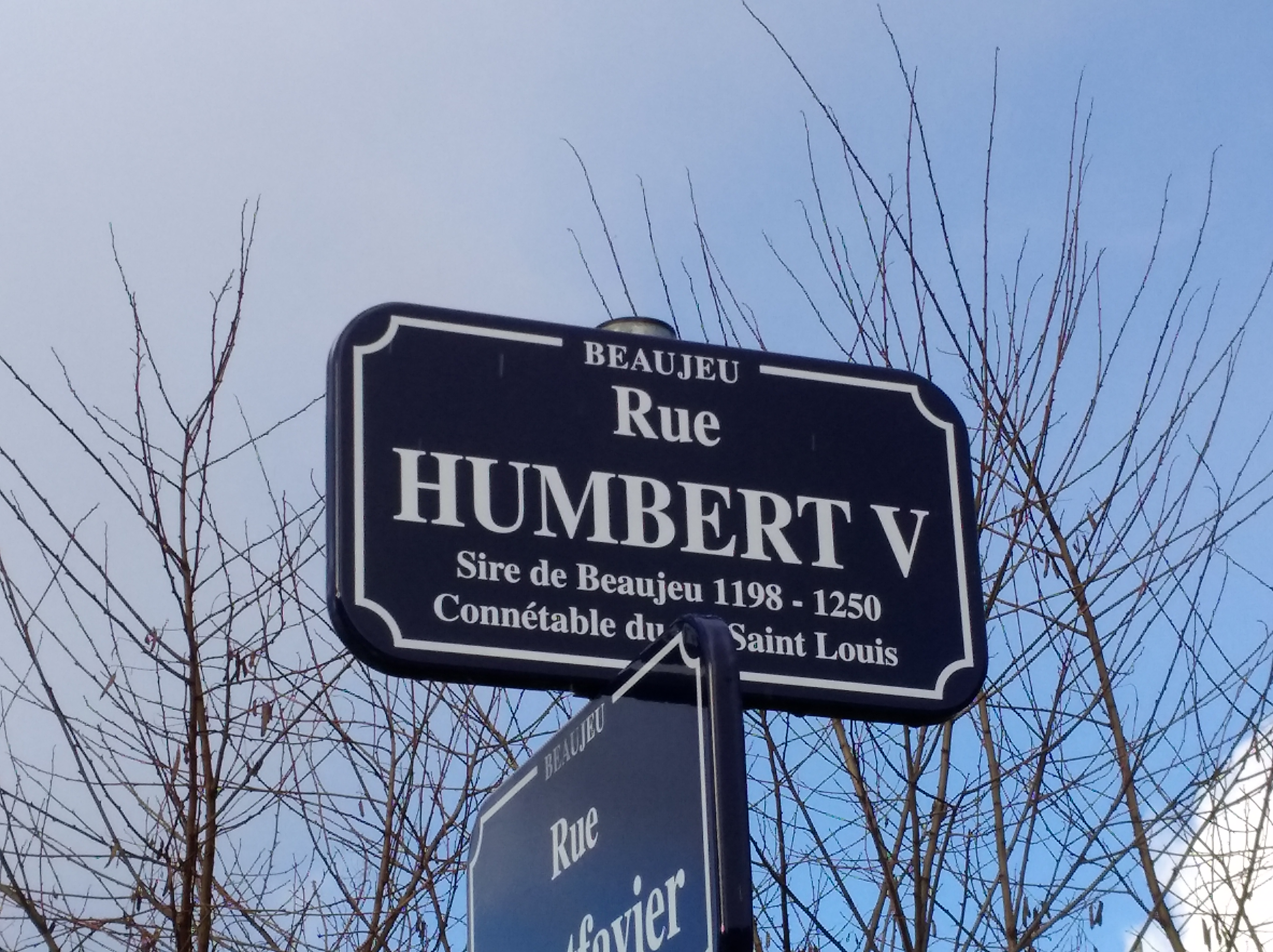

Humbert V de Beaujeu (1198 – mid 1250) was Constable of France (1240) under King Louis IX. He was maternal grandson of Baldwin V, Count of Hainaut and nephew of Isabelle of Hainaut, queen consort of king Philip II of France. He married Marguerite de Baugé in 1219 and had six children.

He participated in the Albigensian Crusade under king Louis VIII of France. In 1226, he was made royal governor of Languedoc, which had been added to royal domain. In 1232 he went to Constantinople to visit his nephew, the Latin Emperor Baldwin II of Courtenay. In 1248, he embarked on the Seventh Crusade to Egypt and laid siege to the city of Mansoura. In Mansoura, the king's younger brother, Robert I, Count of Artois, died on February 8, 1250. After leaving Egypt, he died in Syria sometime between May 21 and August 1, 1250. In his will, dated July 1248, he bequeathed 60 sous forts to the parish church of Meillonnas.
