= Baird (given name) =

Baird is a given name which may refer to:

- Baird Bryant (1927–2008), American cinematographer and filmmaker
- Baird Searles (1934–1993), American science fiction author and critic
- Baird T. Spalding (1872–1953), American writer
- Baird Tipson, American academic and college administrator
