= Pierre II Biard =

French sculptor and architect

Pierre II Biard also called Pierre Biard the younger (1592 – May 28, 1661), was a French sculptor and architect of the seventeenth century, part of a lineage of prominent sculptors.

== Biography ==
Son of the sculptor Pierre Biard l'Aîné (Pierre I Biard), Pierre II Biard first studied in his father's studio. Sculptor to the king in 1609, he became valet to the king from 1619 to 1633. He was the brother of Barbe Biard, wife of Sébastien Bruant, he is thus allied to the Bruant family of architects, and in particular was the uncle of the architect Jacques Bruant (1624-1664) and his brother Libéral Bruant (1635-1697).

Biard was a favorite sculptor of Louis XIII and Marie de Medici.

Few examples of his art have survived. Biard is credited with the praying figure of Nicolas Le Jay, Keeper of the Seals, for his tomb installed in the convent of the Minimes in Place Royale. Only the bust of the deceased remains today, in the Louvre. He is also credited with the equestrian statue of Louis XIII (on a bronze horse by Daniele da Volterra), erected on the Place Royale (now Place des Vosges) in 1639, now destroyed. Biard was also the author of the tomb of Charles de Valois, Duke of Angoulême. The funerary effigy is now kept in the Historical Library of the City of Paris.

In 1642, Rachel de Cochefilet, widow of the Minister Sully, commissioned a large full-length statue of her husband, placed in the Château de Villebon until 1793. The work is now kept at the castle of Sully-sur-Loire.

== List of works ==
- North chimney of the great hall of the Hôtel de Ville in Paris, 1613, destroyed
- The Seine and The Rhône, around 1624 – 163], crowning the Medici Fountain, in the Jardin du Luxembourg (Paris )
- Bust of Nicolas Le Jay, Keeper of the Seals, after 1636, marble, Paris, Louvre Museum
- Equestrian monument of Louis XIII on the Place Royale, 1634 – 1639, destroyed
- Amphitrite on a shell, bronze statue for the grounds of the Château de Bagnolet, 1633(destroyed, known from a reproduction drawn by Pierre Brébiette
- Statue at the foot of Maximilien de Béthune, Duke of Sully, 1639, Sully-sur-Loire, castle museum
- Madonna and Child for the Church of Mercy in Paris, 1655, lost
- Tomb of Charles de Valois, Duke of Angoulême, 1659, Paris, Hôtel de Lamoignon, Historical Library of the City of Paris

Several engravings made during his stay in Rome are known today.
