= Vahvajärvi =

Lake in Southern Savonia, Finland

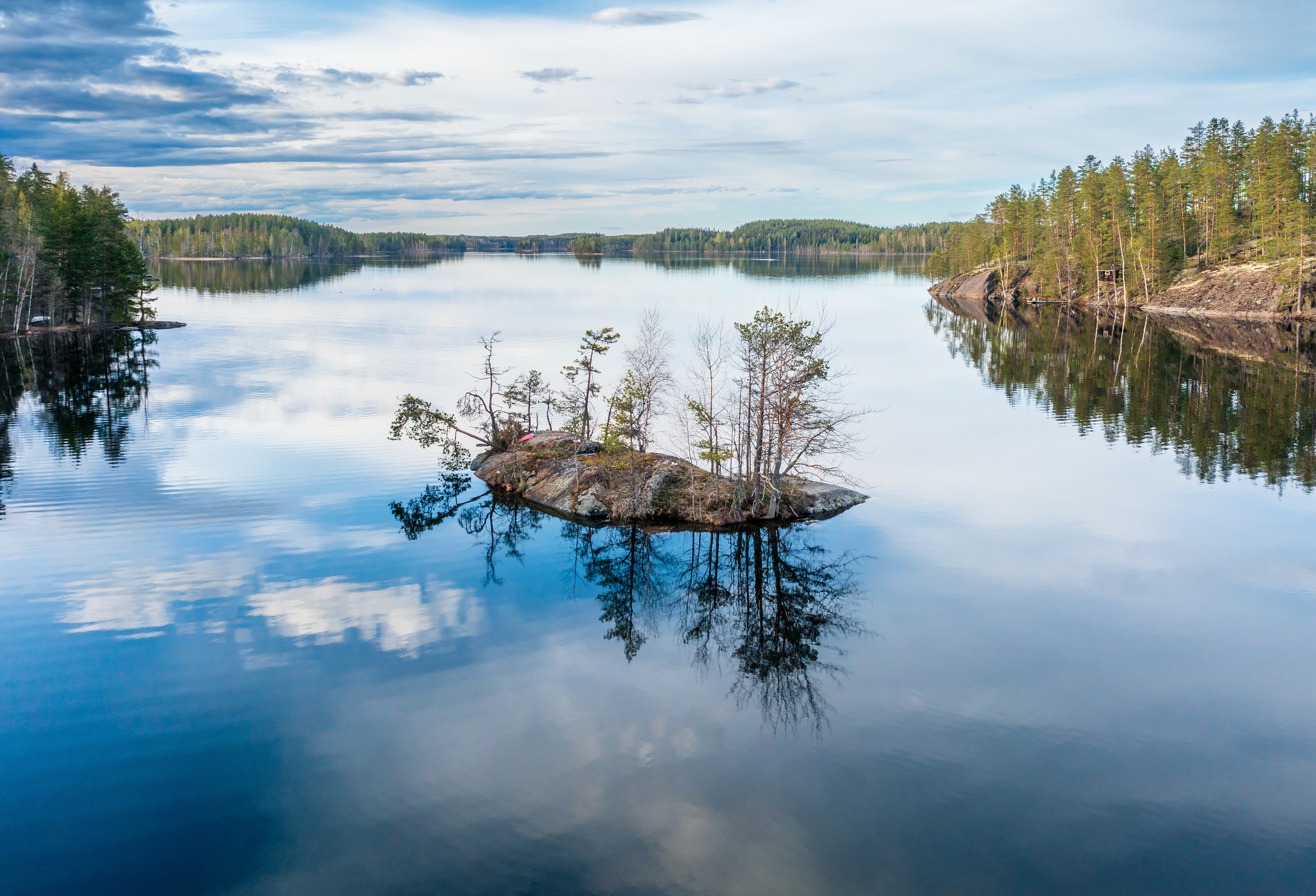

- Location within Finland
- Coordinates: 61°39′N 26°40′E
- Primary inflows: Kissakoski canal
- Primary outflows: via Ripatinkoski Rapids to the lake Iso-Sämpiä
- Basin countries: Finland
- Surface area: 13.888 km^{2} (5.362 sq mi)
- Shore length^{1}: 70.65 km (43.90 mi)
- Surface elevation: 88.6 m (291 ft)
- Frozen: December–April
- Islands: Iso Pihlajasaari, Sätkysaari
- Settlements: Hämeenmäki
- ^{1} Shore length is not a well-defined measure.

Vahvajärvi (Finnish pronunciation: [ˈʋɑhʋɑˌjærʋi]; lit. 'Strong Lake') is a lake in Hirvensalmi, Finland. It is a medium-sized lake in the Kymijoki main catchment area. It is located in the region of Southern Savonia. The length of the lake is about ten kilometers.

The lake gets its water through the Kissakoski canal from the lake Liekune, which is a part of a larger lake complex, Puula. When the canal was dug, the water level in Vahvajärvi rose several feet. The water then runs to Ripatinkoski (Ripatti Rapids), a one-mile stream between Vahvajärvi and Iso-Sämpiä.

== See also ==
- List of lakes in Finland
