= Mercurio Baiardo =

Italian painter

Mercurio Baiardo or Bajardo (active 1555–1574) was an Italian painter, active during the Renaissance in Parma. He was a pupil of Parmigianino. In 1568, he painted in chiaro-oscuro, figures for pilasters of the dome of the church of the Steccata. For the church of Santa Maria del Quartiere, he painted a Madonna and Lactating Child (1574). He also painted frescoes for the Palazzo Venturini, Parma.
