= Baird House =

Baird House may refer to:

- Baird House (Opa-Locka, Florida), listed on the National Register of Historic Places in Florida
- Theodore Baird Residence, Amherst, Massachusetts, designed by Frank Lloyd Wright and also known as Baird House (and listed as Baird House on National Register of Historic Places)
