= Tuukkala =

Village in Hirvensalmi, Finland

Coordinates: 61°43′N 26°35′E

Tuukkala is a village in Hirvensalmi, Eastern Finland. It is located on an isthmus between the lakes Suontee and Puula. In the north-west part of the village is the sawmill of Kuitula. The village has lost some of its population and at the same time post office, bank and two stores have quit. At the moment Tarmo-convenience store is the only shop in the village. Farming is an important source of livelihood, and the two farms in the village both produce milk.
