= Pierre Terrail, seigneur de Bayard =

French knight (c. 1476–1524)

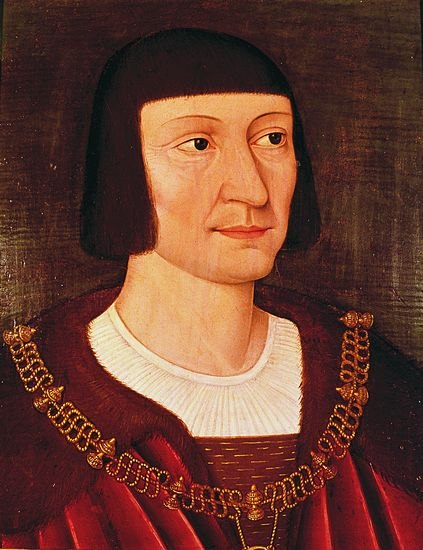
- Born: c. 1476; Château Bayard, Kingdom of France
- Died: 30 April 1524 (aged 47–48); Rovasenda, Duchy of Savoy
- Children: 1
- Military career
- Allegiance: Kingdom of France
- Nickname: Chevalier de Bayard
- Conflicts: Italian War of 1494–1498; Battle of Fornovo; Italian Wars of 1499–1504; Battle of Garigliano (1503); War of the League of Cambrai; Battle of Agnadello; Siege of Padua; Siege of Brescia; Battle of Ravenna (1512); Battle of the Spurs; Battle of Marignano; Italian War of 1521–1526; Siege of Mézières; Battle of the Sesia (1524) (DOW)
- Awards: Order of Saint Michael

Pierre Terrail, seigneur de Bayard (c. 1476 – 30 April 1524) was a French knight and military leader at the transition between the Middle Ages and the Renaissance, generally known as the Chevalier de Bayard. Throughout the centuries since his death, he has been known as "the knight without fear and beyond reproach" (le chevalier sans peur et sans reproche). He himself preferred the name given him by his contemporaries for his gaiety and kindness, le bon chevalier ("the good knight").

== Early life ==
The descendant of a noble family with a military tradition – three generations of Terrail ancestors had fallen in battle successively from 1356 to 1465 – Bayard was born at the Château Bayard, Dauphiné (near Pontcharra, Isère) in southern France. He served as a page to the young Duke Charles I of Savoy until March 1490, when the Duke died of an illness.

At age thirteen he came to the attention of King Charles VIII of France when he put on a remarkable display of horsemanship for the Duke of Savoy that earned him the nickname piquet (spur).

== 1490 – Service of King Charles VIII of France ==
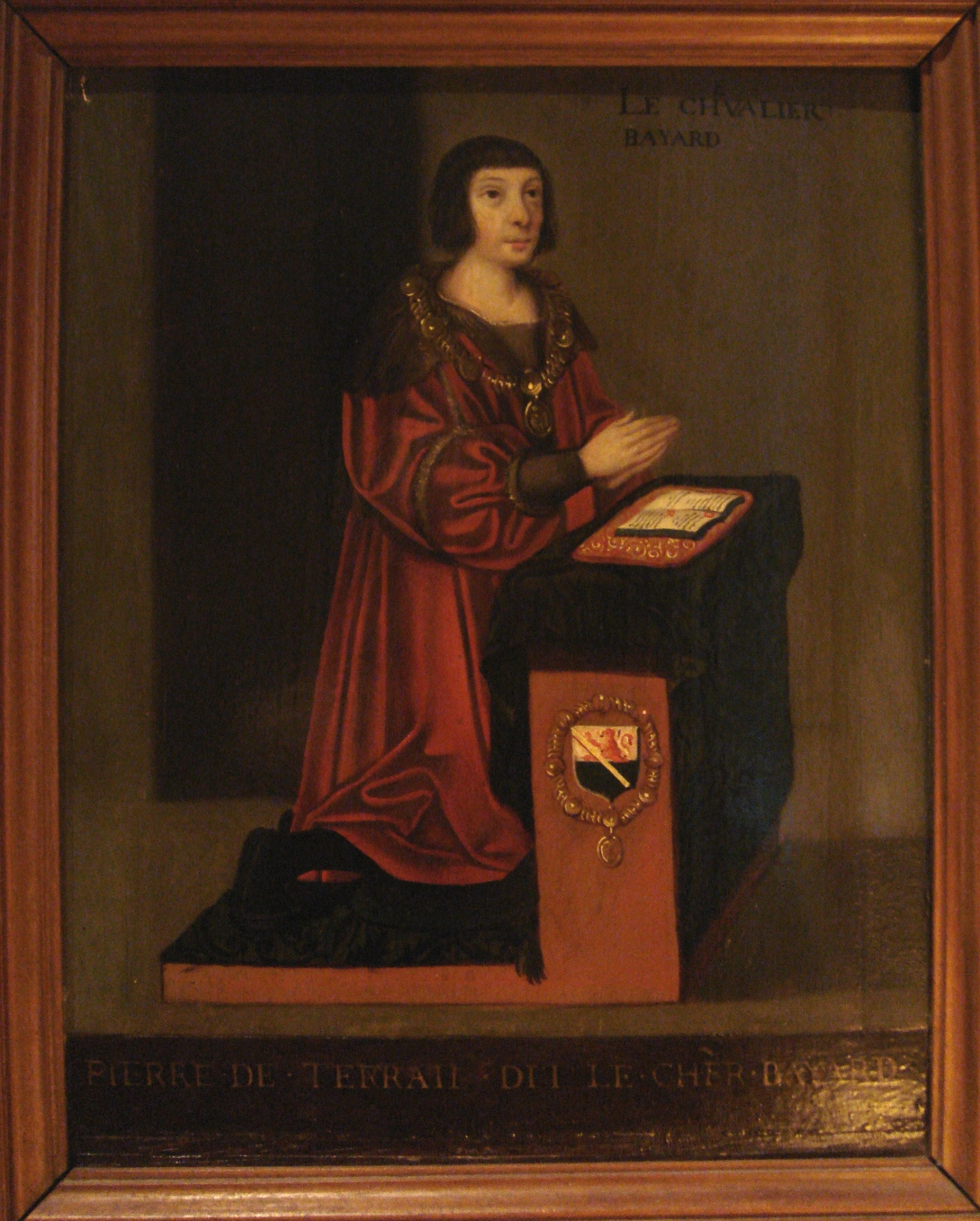
Chevalier Bayard in a 16th-century French school painting.

=== 1490 – Man at arms of Louis de Luxembourg ===
In 1490 Bayard took service as a man-at-arms in the household of Louis de Luxembourg, the seigneur de Ligny (November 1490) and a favorite of King Charles VIII of France. As a youth, Bayard was distinguished by his looks, charming manner, and skill in the tiltyard.

On 20 July 1494, a tournée was held in Lyons, attended by the king and his court. Though not yet eighteen, Bayard won the highest honors, again coming to the attention of the king.

=== 1494 – Battle of Naples ===
In 1494, Bayard accompanied Charles VIII's expedition into Italy to seize the Kingdom of Naples. This campaign is now known as the Italian War of 1494–1498.

=== 1495 – Battle of Fornovo ===
Bayard was knighted after the 1495 Battle of Fornovo in which he captured a standard. Shortly afterward, entering Milan alone in pursuit of the enemy, he was taken prisoner but was set free without a ransom by Ludovico Sforza.

=== Duel with Sotomayor ===
What first made Bayard truly famous in Italy, was an episode that took place in 1502, when a Gascon named Gaspar took prisoner Alonso de Sotomayor, a Spanish knight of gigantic stature and endowed with Herculean strength, while he was on his way to Rome. While Gaspar was waiting for the ransom due, Bayard took over the prisoner to prevent him from suffering ill-treatment, welcomed him into his home and treated him with all the respect and honor that he granted to his friends. However, the Spaniard, after gaining his freedom, accused Bayard of mistreating him and of having suffered terrible pains. As soon as he learned of this, the indignant Bayard challenged him to a duel to the death.

Bayard suffered at that time from serious attacks of malaria that weakened him physically and, as a sick person, he had the right to be represented by another. His friend Bellabre immediately volunteered in his place, but Bayard refused, saying he wanted to defend his own honor. On the day of the duel he had just recovered from the last attack of fever; after lying on the ground and having entrusted his soul to God, he went down to wait for his adversary. Sotomayor made him wait a long time in armor under the sun with the intent to tire him and weaken him further.

La Palice, worried about the delay, went to urge the Spaniard to present himself on the field. However, Sotomayor now placed a condition on the duel: as the challenged party, it was up to him to choose the weapons to be used. He declared that he wanted to fight on foot with a sword and a dagger. In this way, thanks to his build, he would have outreached his opponent. The request was disconcerting, as knights always clashed on horseback with lance and sword. He hoped that Bayard would be pushed by his friends to call off the duel. Instead, Bayard dismounted and the duel began.

Sotomayor initially feinted at Bayard, still trying to tire his opponent. Several times he repeated the same move: to raise the sword with two hands to lower it on the head of Bayard, who always dodged him. At the fourth time that the tactic was repeated, Bayard took advantage of the opportunity, threw himself forward and with the tip of the sword skewered from below the uncovered throat of the Spaniard, then finished him by planting the dagger in one eye. The French celebrated him exultantly with drums and piffari, but Bayard ordered them to be silent, since he did not want death to be celebrated. He went to a church where he began to pray on his knees for the soul of the dead.

=== 1502 – Battle of Canossa ===
In 1502 Bayard was wounded at Canossa.

=== 1503 – Battle of Garigliano ===
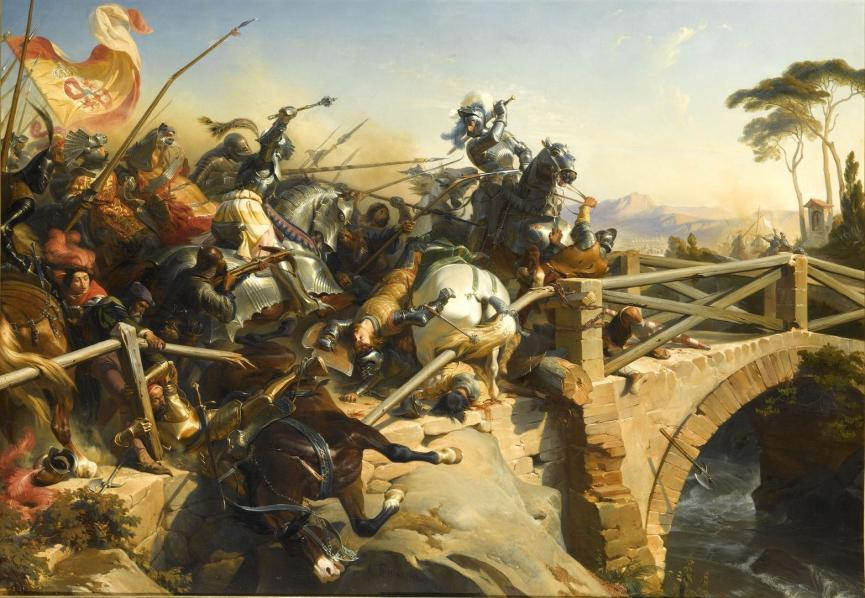
Bayard at the Battle of Garigliano (1503), by Philippoteaux

In the autumn of 1503, the French army moved towards Naples and in November reached the Garigliano river; there, sentinels sighted the Spanish troops commanded by Gonzalo Fernández de Córdoba, a general who months earlier had inflicted a heavy defeat on the French near Cerignola. Because the river was in flood, the French threw a bridge of boats across it, covered by artillery fire that prevented the Spaniards from disturbing the operation. Having established the bridge, the French made camp, preferring to postpone the advance towards Naples to the following Spring. The army, too numerous to stay in the same camp, was divided and several battalions were dispersed in the surrounding villages. The Spaniards, taking advantage of the winter mists and the division of the French army, on 28 December, on the advice of Bartolomeo d'Alviano, threw another bridge of boats across the river and seized the unguarded and poorly defended camp. The rout that followed was catastrophic for the army of Louis XII: the sentinels noticed the attack too late and the commanders, caught off guard, did not have time to organize an effective defense and so turned to flight, pressed hard by Italian and Spanish cavalry.

Bayard, armed with sword and spear, then placed himself in the middle of the bridge, challenging alone about 300 or 400 Spaniards who, though numerous, could not even make him retreat. Around the knight rained arrows, spears, and spades, but he, dodging them, continued to repel all who climbed the bridge to face him, until his friend Bellabre rushed to pull him away from there to take him to safety. Bayard's intervention made it possible to cover the retreat of the French army and gave them time to place the artillery to be ready to face the Spaniards and start the counterattack.

This feat, cloaked in legend, contributed significantly to his fame as a knight "without spot and without fear", so much so that Pope Julius II himself tried in vain to secure his services.

Despite the value of Bayard, the French still had the worst on the Garigliano: their army was nearly annihilated; according to Bartolomeo d'Alviano, the main architect of the resounding Spanish victory, the army of Louis XII counted 1,500 spears, 3,400 cavalrymen, and 8,000 infantry that after the battle had been reduced to just 200 spears, 150 cavalrymen, and 600 infantry. These troops barricaded themselves in Gaeta, where a few days later they negotiated the surrender, but demanded that all prisoners be released and that transit to the north be ensured. Fernández de Córdoba agreed.

== 1508 – Service of King Louis XII of France ==
In 1508, Bayard accompanied King Louis XII against rebellious Genoa. In the battle that broke the back of the rebellion, Bayard played the role of champion and spearhead in the French assault, a breakneck cavalry charge up a mountain slope against a seemingly impregnable barricade defended by a pike-phalanx of Genoese militia. The Genoese broke and fled before the furious charge of Bayard and the French gendarmes. Genoa subsequently fell, and Bayard entered the city in triumph behind his king.

In June of that year, Louis XII played host to the Spanish king, Ferdinand. Weeks of festivities followed, including tourneys, banquets, and balls. Bayard was the champion of the first, and at the last became reacquainted with his former opponent at the Garigliano, Gonzalo Fernández de Córdoba, El Gran Capitán ("The Great Captain") of Spain.

=== 1509 – Battle of Agnadello ===
In 1509, the League of Cambrai was formed between France, the Holy Roman Empire, Spain, and the Papacy in an effort to wrest from Venice its territorial empire in northeastern Italy.

For this campaign, the king commissioned Bayard to raise a company of horse and foot. Until that time, French infantry had been a despised rabble. Bayard's company became a model of discipline, high morale, and battlefield effectiveness, and played a key role that year in rescuing the French vanguard at the Battle of Agnadello, on 14 May 1509 against the Venetian forces led by Bartolomeo d'Alviano.

=== 1509 – Siege of Padua ===
Later that year, Bayard was among the French forces under Jacques de La Palice sent to join their German ally, the Emperor Maximilian I at the Siege of Padua. Though the siege ultimately failed, what early success the allies enjoyed was largely due to Bayard's combination of cool-headed leadership and dashing bravado.

Following the lifting of the siege by the Emperor, Bayard and a force of 300 men-at-arms retired into garrison at Verona. Bayard successfully carried out a series of raids and ambushes against Venetian forces in the vicinity, proving himself a master of "small war", and adept at the leading of what today would be called "special operations".

In 1510 the Duchy of Ferrara joined the alliance. Bayard was co-commander of the French contingent sent to garrison and aid the city and its Duke, Alfonso d'Este. During his eight-month stay, Bayard won the admiration of the duke and his wife, the lady Lucrezia Borgia. According to his biographer, "The Loyal Servant" (likely Bayard's archer and lifelong secretary, Jacques de Mailles), Bayard fully reciprocated Lucrezia's admiration, considering her "a pearl" among women. He returned to Ferrara on other occasions to pay homage to the lady, once in the company of Gaston de Foix, duc de Nemours, just months before the Battle of Ravenna, where the Duke lost his life.

=== 1511 – Holy League ===
By 1511 the League of Cambrai had collapsed due to papal fears of the growing power of France in Italy. To counter this, Pope Julius II declared the formation of the Holy League. This alliance put France at odds with not only the papacy but its erstwhile ally, the Holy Roman Empire, as well as Spain and ultimately the Swiss Confederation.

In various skirmishes with papal troops around Ferrara, Bayard continued to win renown. In one instance, he very nearly captured the Pope himself. About this time, the Duke Alphonso and Bayard found themselves under papal interdict. How long Bayard's period of excommunication lasted is unclear.

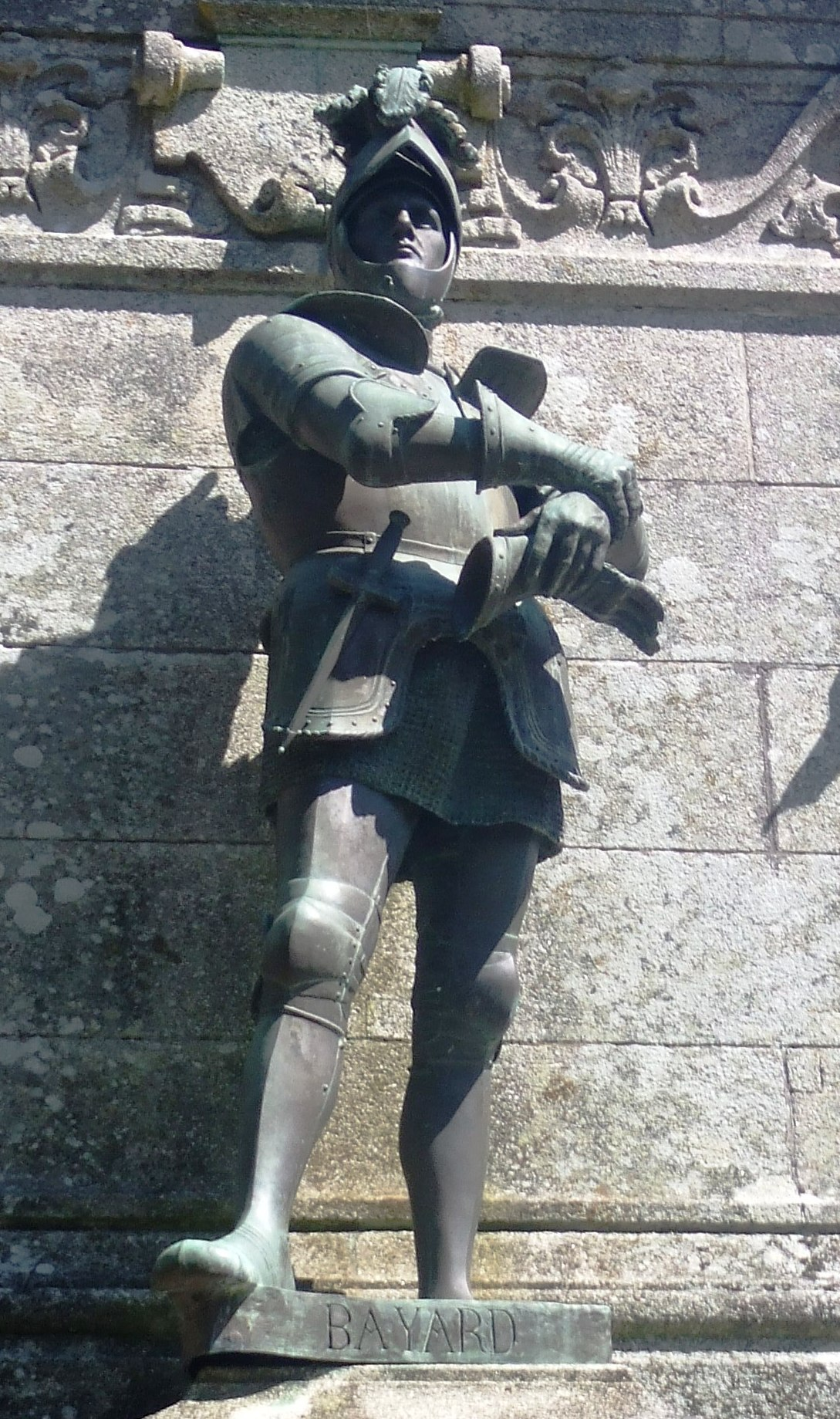
Statue of Pierre Terrail, Seigneur de Bayard, in Sainte-Anne-d'Auray, France. 1893 statue.

=== 1512 – Siege of Brescia ===
At the Siege of Brescia in 1512, Bayard led a wedge of dismounted men-at-arms against the defenders, himself at its tip. Several times the French assault was thrown back. Each time Bayard rallied the French forces and led them in renewed attacks. His boldness at last resulted in a severe wound to the thigh, but not before the defenses were breached and the French entered the town.

The soldiers carried Bayard into a neighbouring mansion, the residence of a nobleman, whose wife and daughters he protected from threatened insult. Bayard was charmed by the young daughters, who sang to him nightly. Before his wound was healed, he learned that battle was imminent at Ravenna, and he hurried to depart to rejoin his comrades. He endowed the two daughters with a thousand gold ducats each, the money the lady of the house had paid him as ransom for her family.

=== 1512 – Battle of Ravenna ===
Bayard joined his commander and friend, Gaston of Foix, Duke of Nemours, in time for the fateful Battle of Ravenna (1512). Bayard's gallantry and the French cavalry under de Foix carried the day, but the duke was killed in the final hour, rendering the battle a strategic loss for the French and a personal tragedy for Bayard.

=== 1512 – Battle of Pamplona ===
Bayard was sent to Navarre with La Palice to support John III of Navarre and his co-monarch Catherine, who wanted to recover their kingdom, which had been conquered by the King of Spain Fernando II of Aragon. Bayard took part in the capture of the castle of Tiebas and the failed assault on Pamplona (27 November 1512.)

=== 1513 – Battle of the Spurs ===
In 1513, when Henry VIII of England routed the French at the Battle of the Spurs (Guinegate, where Bayard's father had received a lifelong injury in a battle of 1479), Bayard, trying to rally his countrymen, found his escape cut off. Unwilling to surrender, he rode suddenly up to an English officer who was resting unarmed, and summoned him to yield; the knight complying, Bayard in turn gave himself up to his prisoner. He was taken into the English camp, but his gallantry impressed Henry as it had Ludovico, and the king released him without ransom, merely exacting his word not to serve for six weeks.

== 1515 – Service of King Francis I of France and death ==
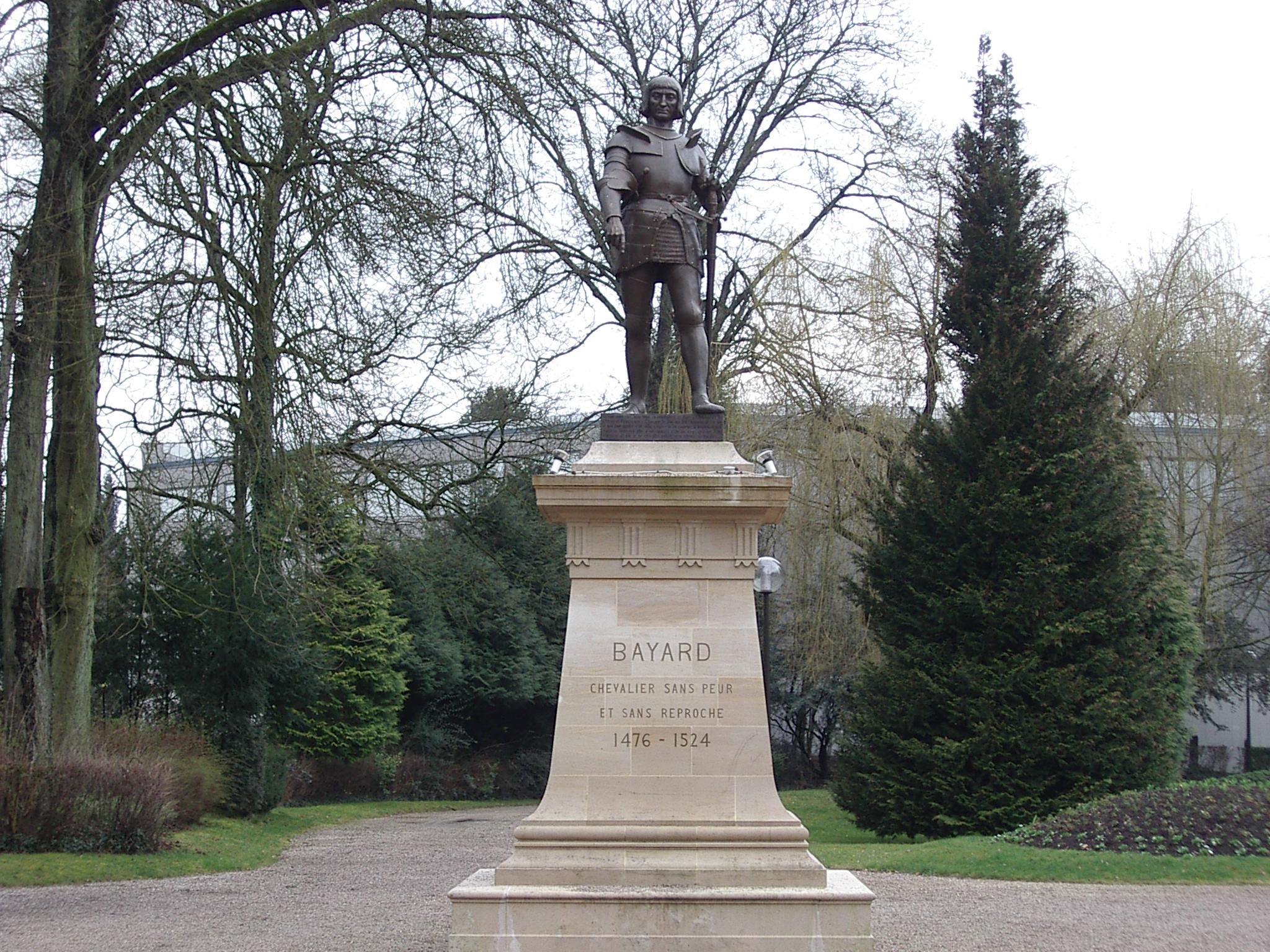
Bayard by Aristide Croisy (1893) Charleville-Mézières

On the accession of Francis I in 1515, Bayard was made lieutenant-general of Dauphiné, but soon accompanied the King and army into the territory of Milan, control of which was challenged by the Swiss. At the Battle of Marignano the opposing armies engaged in a protracted and bloody struggle which the French won largely because of the valour of Bayard, King Francis, and the French gendarmes (armored lancers). After the battle, Bayard had the honour of conferring knighthood on his youthful sovereign.

=== 1521 – Siege of Mézières ===
When war again broke out between Francis I and Charles V, Holy Roman Emperor, Bayard, with 1000 men, held Mézières, which had been declared untenable, against an army of 35,000, and after six weeks compelled the imperial generals to raise the siege. This stubborn resistance saved central France from invasion, as the king did not have sufficient forces to withstand the Holy Roman Empire.

All France celebrated the achievement, and Francis gained time to collect the royal army, which drove out the invaders in 1521. The parlement thanked Bayard as the saviour of his country; the king made him a knight of the Order of Saint Michael and commander in his own name of 100 gens d'armes, an honour until then reserved for princes of the blood.

=== 1524 – Death in Italy ===
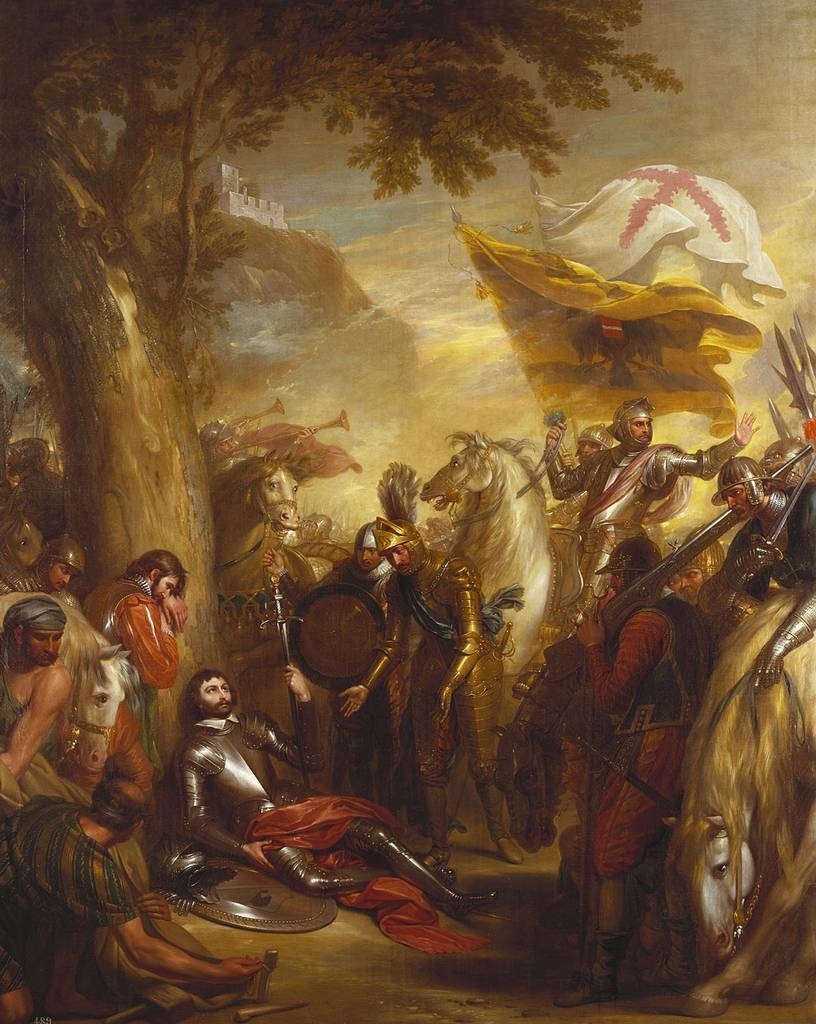
The Death of Chevalier Bayard by Benjamin West, 1772

After allaying a revolt at Genoa, and striving with the greatest assiduity to check a pestilence in Dauphiné, Bayard was sent into Italy with Admiral Bonnivet, who, being defeated at Robecco and wounded in a combat during his retreat, implored Bayard to assume command and save the army. He repulsed the foremost pursuers, but in guarding the rear at the passage of the river Sesia between the towns of Romagnano Sesia and Gattinara, was mortally wounded by an arquebus ball and died in Rovasenda on April 30, 1524.

He died in the midst of the enemy, attended by Pescara, the Spanish commander, and by his old comrade, Charles, duc de Bourbon, who was now fighting on the opposite side. Charles is reported to have said "Ah! Monsieur de Bayard... I am very sad to see you in this state; you who were such a virtuous knight!" Bayard answered,

Sir, there is no need to pity me. I die as a man of honour ought, doing my duty; but I pity you, because you are fighting against your king, your country, and your oath.

His body was restored to his friends and interred at Saint-Martin-d'Hères. In 1822 his remains were buried in the Collegiate Church of Saint-André, Grenoble.

== Personal life ==
Jacques de Maille reports that for many years – one can say throughout his life, if one excludes his first youthful platonic love – Bayard loved a woman whose identity he never revealed. Bayard's only child was born in Cantù, in 1501: Jeanne Terrail. Since he could not take care of her, engaged as he was in campaigning, Bayard had her raised in France by his sister Jeanne, a nun in the Abbey des Ayes. Since Terrail is never referred to as a "bastard" but always as a "daughter" and since Bayard would refuse in the future the marriage proposed to him by Queen Anne, it is believed that he had married the girl's mother. Various hypotheses have been made about the identity of the mother: numerous clues lead to Bianca di Monferrato, the Duchess of Savoy, who was widowed when very young. This is supported by Bayard's presence at that time in Piedmont and his statement that the child was noble and the daughter of a lady of great house. The hypothesis is strongly supported by Paul Ballaguy, while Camille Monnet categorically rejects it.

== Appearance and personality ==
In his portrait by Jacques de Mailles, his squire and biographer, Bayard appears as man with a sharp and pale face, with brown hair, a long nose, attentive and bright eyes. According to a DNA study of Bayard's skull, he had brown eyes, brownish hair and pale skin. Jacques writes that Bayard, small in stature as a child, grew considerably during adolescence; this is supported by modern studies of his skull which hypothesize that he had reached 1.8 meters (5 foot 11 inches), an above-average height for his time.

The French historian Aymar du Rivail described him as "courteous, cheerful; not proud, indeed modest".

For the investiture as a knight that he received in battle, Bayard always felt deeply linked to the chivalric code of honor. Absolute loyalty even towards enemies, charity and help were his rules of life, in fact he did his utmost for the recovery of prostitutes and personally assisted the sick of the plague. While his fellow countrymen indulged in violence and raids, Bayard always remained respectful towards the weak and the vanquished, doing his utmost for their defense, and burned with furious anger in the face of all cruelty and injustice. He even used to pay out of his own pocket for the goods he requisitioned for the need for provisions, while his fellow countrymen used to simply snatch them from the peasants with violence.

Since he usually led the vanguard in the advances and passed to the rearguard in the retreats, he ordered his men to extinguish the fires that his colleagues had set in the villages, and placed sentinels in defense of the churches and monasteries to prevent the looting and rape of women who had taken refuge there.

Such was the fame of the magnanimity of Bayard that the people of Italy, who fled into the woods and mountains when armed men arrived, instead came running to meet his troops, loudly acclaiming his name and offering him gifts.

This did not prevent him from becoming a fierce and feared fighter in battle. He knew no mercy either towards his enemies or towards himself, and in this way he did not enter into contradiction with the vivid religious faith that he had nourished since childhood. God had wanted him to be a knight and he limited himself to fulfilling God's will; he always placed himself in God's hands immediately before every battle.

== DNA ==
A 2017 research paper by Gérard Lucotte verified that Bayard's mtDNA haplogroup was H10E and that his YDNA haplogroup was R1b-M269.

== Legacy ==
As a soldier, Bayard was considered the epitome of chivalry and one of the most skillful commanders of the age. He was noted for the exactitude and completeness of his information on the enemy's movements, which he obtained by careful reconnaissance and a well-arranged system of espionage.

In the midst of mercenary armies, Bayard remained disinterested. To his contemporaries and his successors, he was known for his romantic heroism, piety, and magnanimity and as `"the fearless and faultless knight" (le chevalier sans peur et sans reproche). His gaiety and kindness won him another name bestowed by his contemporaries, le bon chevalier.

=== Monuments and memorials ===
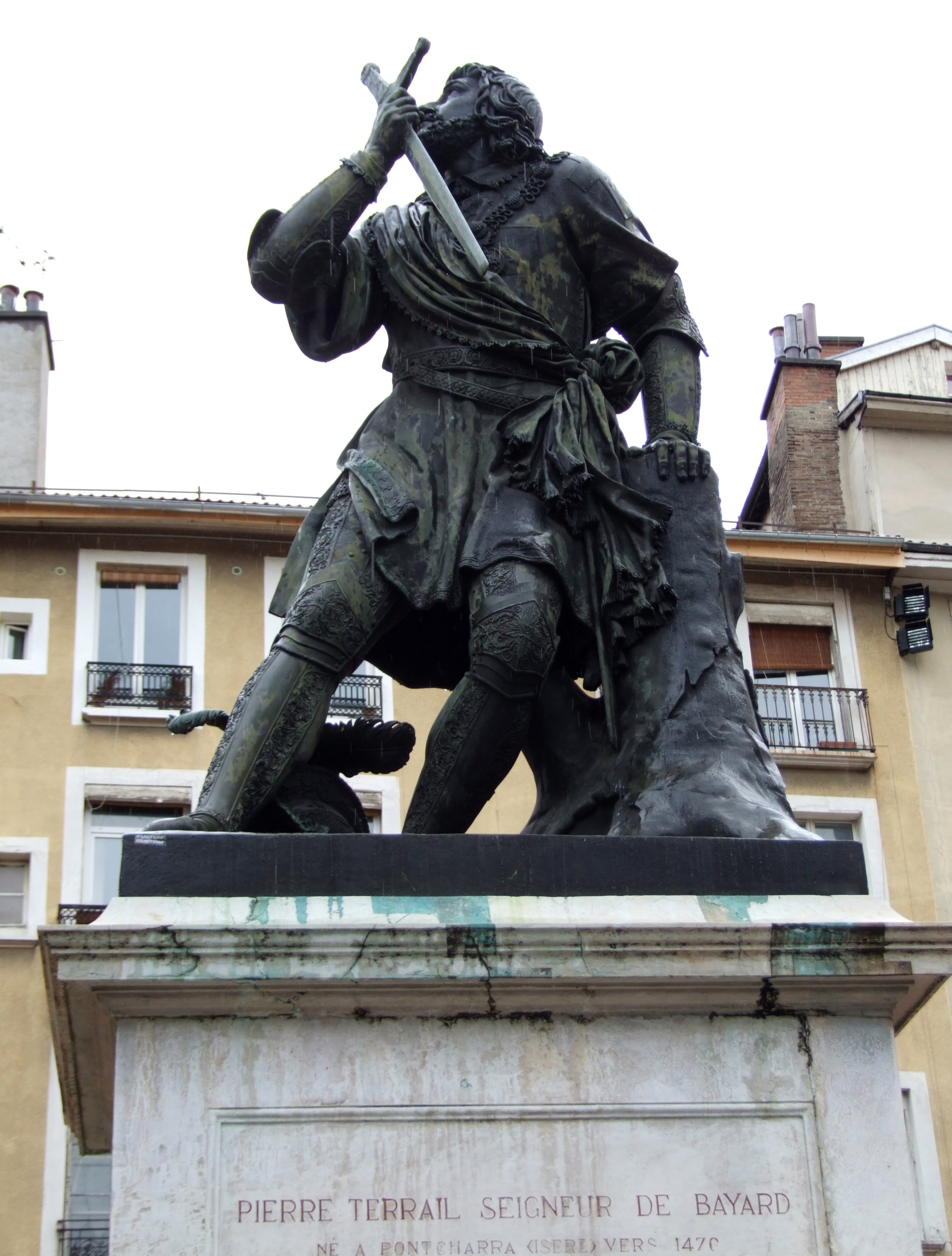
Statue at Grenoble, Nicolas-Bernard Raggi sculptor

- Equestrian statue at Pontcharra (Isère)
- Statue at Grenoble, place Saint-André
- Bayard Mausoleum, (1625), Saint-André Collegiate church at Grenoble
- Musée Bayard at the Château Bayard in Pontcharra
- Statue at Charleville-Mézières, inaugurated October 2005. An earlier statue was damaged during World War I and demolished by the Germans in World War II.
- Statue in the Collège Stanislas de Paris
- Statue in Saint-Denis
- Statue in Sainte-Anne-d'Auray
- Clément-Bayard, an automobile manufacturer of Mézières, was named in his honour and his image was incorporated in the logo.
- Adolphe Clément-Bayard, an entrepreneur who created the Clément-Bayard automobile company in honour of the knight in 1903, and then added Bayard to his family name in 1908

=== In popular culture ===
- Bayard is a recurring character in three novels by author Samuel Shellabarger:
  - Captain from Castile (1945)
  - Prince of Foxes (1947)
  - The King's Cavalier (1950)
- The 1988 movie Sans peur et sans reproche, directed by Gérard Jugnot, is based on Bayard.
