= Lahti Region Educational Consortium =

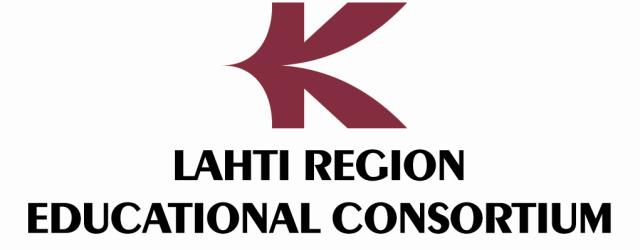
- Company type: Consortium
- Founded: 1996
- Headquarters: Lahti, Finland
- Key people: Managing Director, Martti Tokola
- Services: Lahti University of Applied Sciences; Salpaus Further Education; Tuoterengas
- Number of employees: 1700
- Website: www.phkk.fi/english

Lahti Region Educational Consortium (Finnish: Päijät-Hämeen koulutuskonserni) is a joint municipality located in Southern Finland, 100 km from the capital of Helsinki.

== Business Units ==
- Lahti University of Applied Sciences
- Salpaus Further Education
- Tuoterengas

== Municipalities ==
- Asikkala
- Hartola
- Heinola
- Hollola
- Hämeenkoski
- Kuhmoinen
- Kärkölä
- Lahti
- Nastola
- Orimattila
- Padasjoki
- Pertunmaa
- Sysmä
