= Kairala, Pelkosenniemi =

Village in Pelkosenniemi, Finland

Coordinates: 67°11.2630′N 27°26.5478′E

Kairala
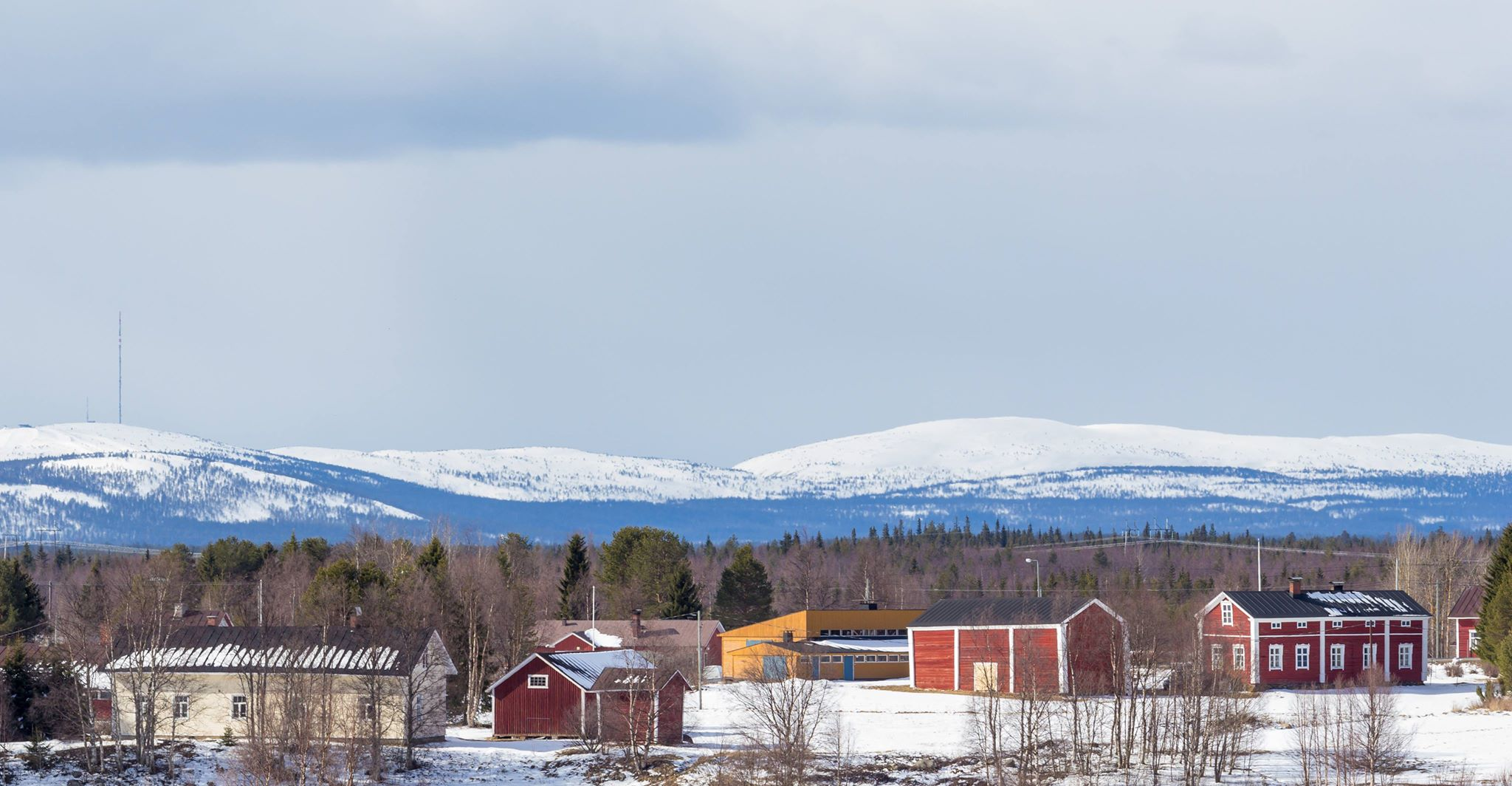
- The Kairala village in 2018.
- Interactive map of Kairala
- Country: Finland
- Region: Lapland
- Municipality: Pelkosenniemi

Kairala (Finnish pronunciation: [ˈkɑi̯rɑlɑ]) is a village of about sixty inhabitants along the Highway 5 (E63) in Pelkosenniemi municipality in Lapland, Finland, located about 10 kilometres (6.2 mi) north of its church village. The village is cut by the Kitinen River, which flows into the Kemi River, and the village's population is located on both sides of the river. The east and west sides of the village are connected by a bridge completed in 1987.

The west side of the village is characterized by many the Rear Bothnian log buildings built mainly on both sides of the 20th century fold, which were left unburnt during the Lapland War when Germans retreated north from the east side of the river. The eastern side of the village was completely burned by Germans, except for one shed building.
