= Lake Sysmä =

Lake Sysmä may refer to:

- Lake Sysmä (Ilomantsi)
- Lake Sysmä (Joroinen)
