= Finnish national road 5 =

Road in Finland

National Road 5
- Valtatie 5 (Finnish); Riksväg 5 (Swedish)
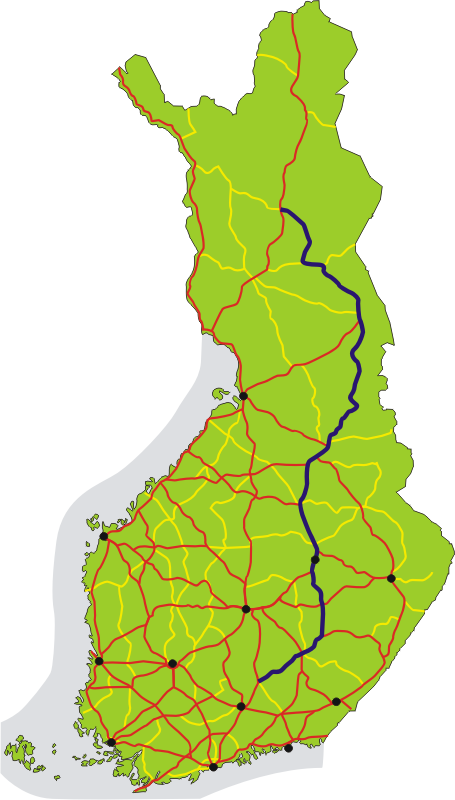

Route information
- Part of E63
- Maintained by Väylävirasto / Trafikledsverket (Finnish Transport Infrastructure Agency)
- Length: 905 km (562 mi)
- Existed: 1938–present

Major junctions
- South end: Lusi, Heinola
- North end: Sodankylä

Location
- Country: Finland
- Major cities: Mikkeli, Kuopio, Kajaani, Kuusamo, Kemijärvi

Highway system
- Highways in Finland
← Vt 4	→ Vt 6

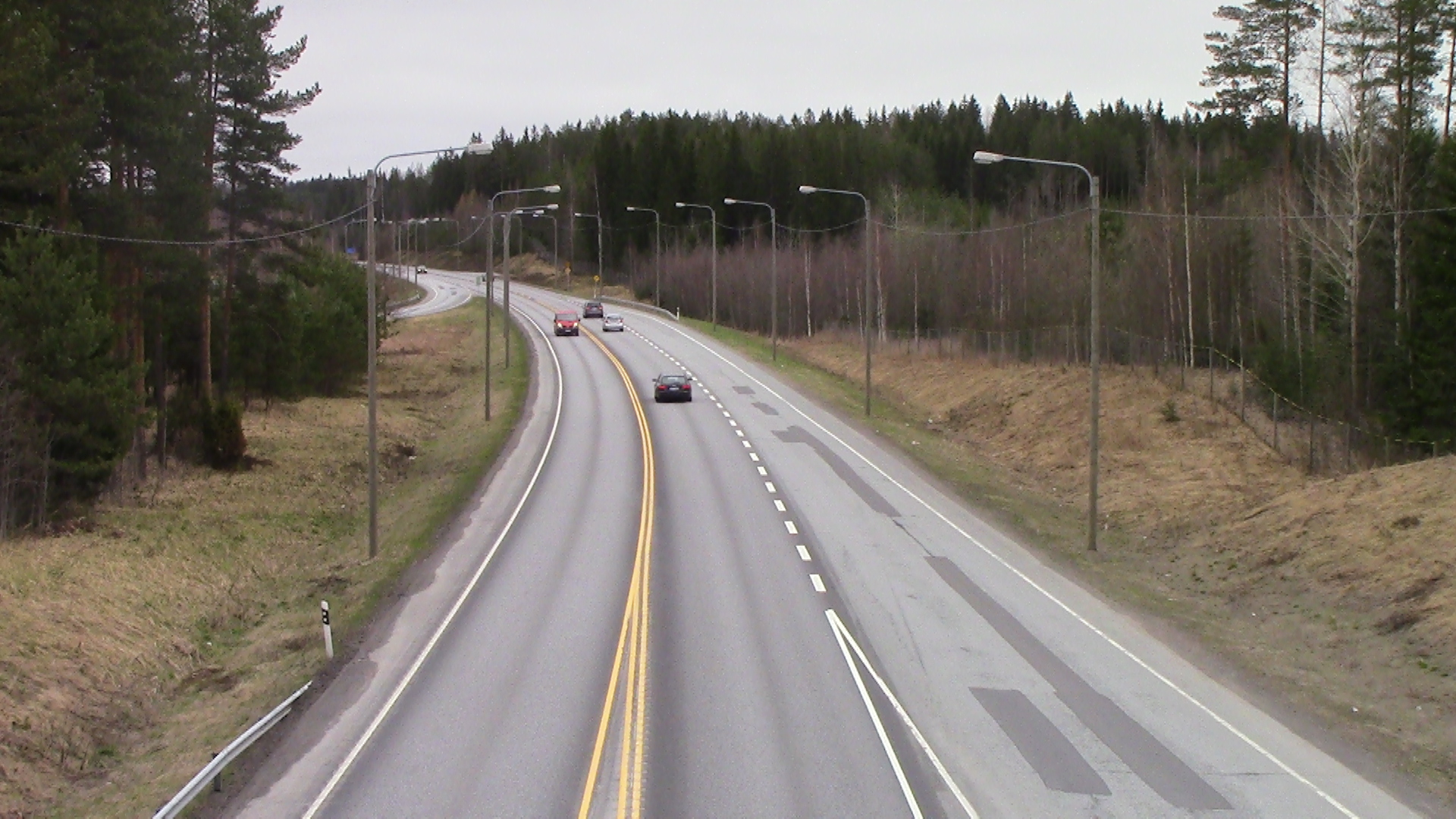
National road 5 at Kuortti, Pertunmaa in May 2018

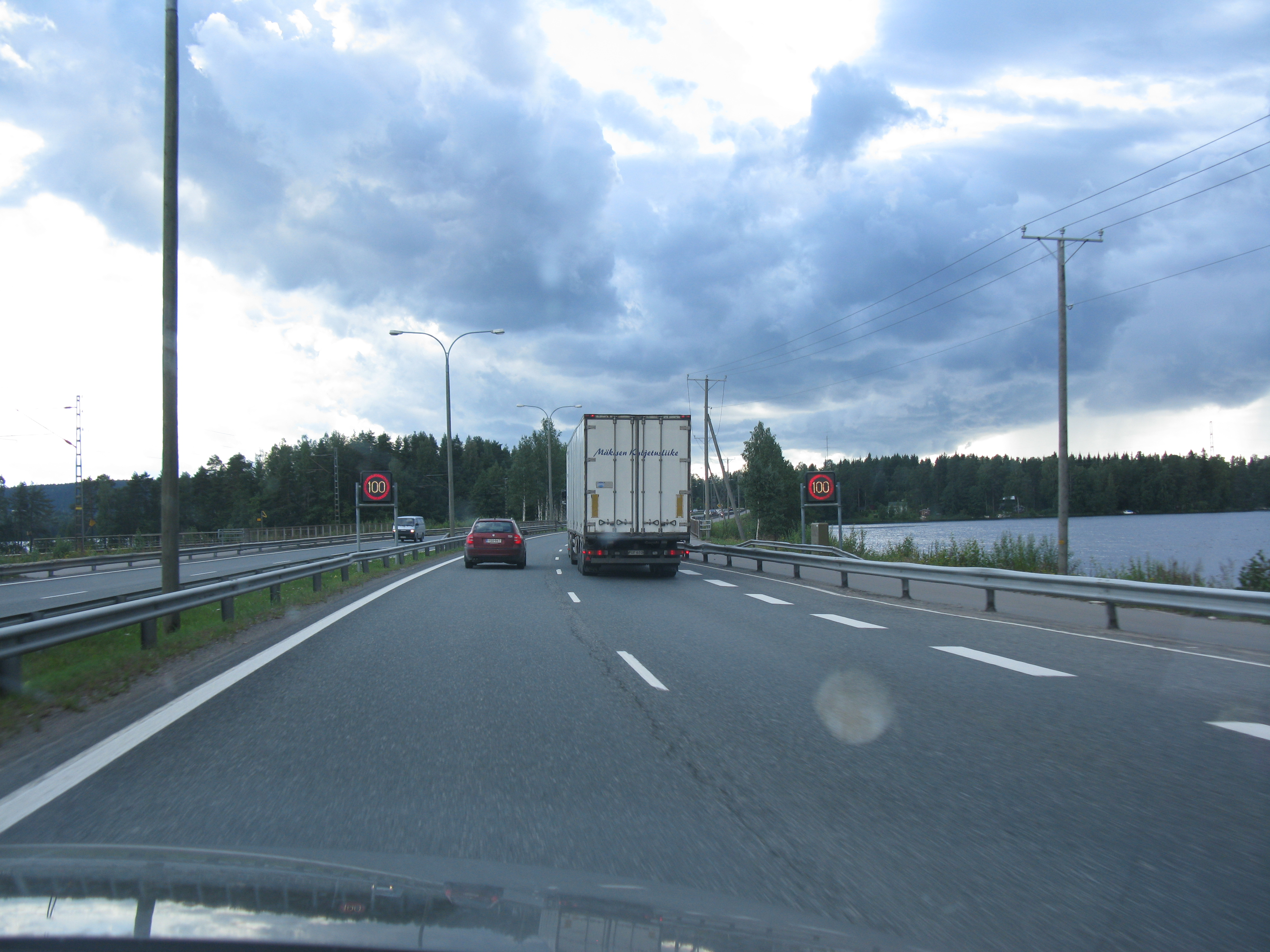
Heading south on National road 5 near Kallansillat at Kuopio

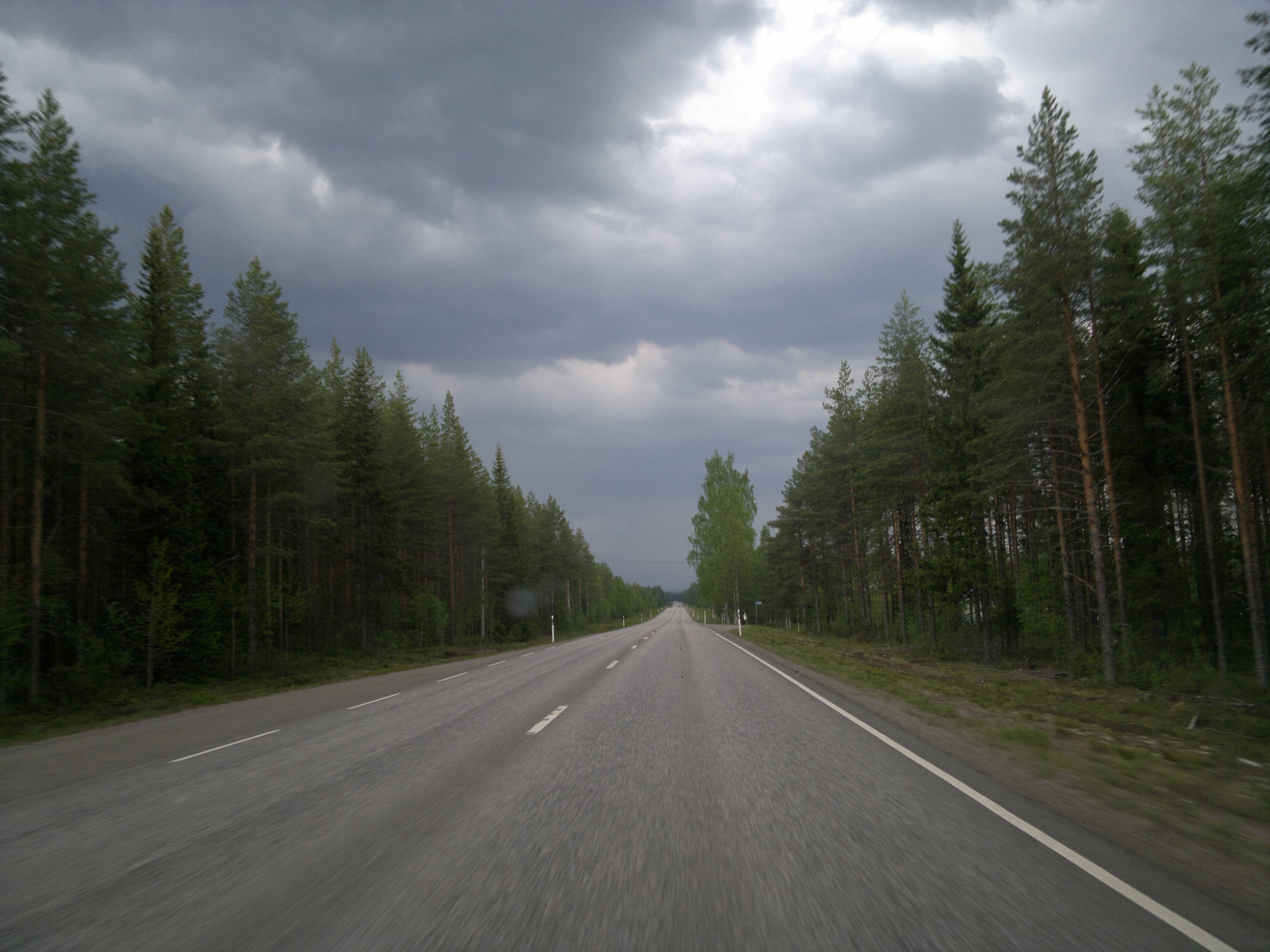
National road 5 at Paltamo in June 2011

Finnish national road 5 (Finnish:Valtatie 5 or Viitostie, Swedish: Riksväg 5) is a main route connecting Lusi (Heinola) in the south of the country to Sodankylä in the north. It is 905 kilometres long. National road 5 forms part of the E63 between Vehmasmäki (Kuopio) and Sodankylä.

== The route ==
The road runs through the following municipalities: Heinola – Pertunmaa – Mäntyharju – Hirvensalmi – Mikkeli – Juva – Joroinen – Varkaus – Leppävirta – Kuopio – Siilinjärvi – Lapinlahti – Iisalmi – Sonkajärvi – Kajaani – Paltamo – Ristijärvi – Hyrynsalmi – Suomussalmi – Taivalkoski – Kuusamo – Posio – Salla – Kemijärvi – Pelkosenniemi – Sodankylä.

== Trivia ==
- Kuortti's ABC filling station is the most popular in Finland in terms of sales; according to the cooperative, in 2017 more than three million customers visited it.
- The band Aavikko has written a song about National road 5 called "Viitostie".
