= Lauri Rapala =

Finnish fisherman; founder of Rapala-Normark Group (1905–1974)

- Born: 1905; Sysmä, Grand Duchy of Finland
- Died: 1974 (aged 68–69); Finland
- Occupations: Fisherman; founder of Rapala
- Known for: Inventor of the Original Floater
- Spouse: Elma Leppänen (m. 1928)
- Children: 7

Lauri Rapala (1905–1974) was a Finnish fisherman, inventor and the founder of Rapala-Normark Group, the world's largest fishing lure and tackle producer. He died in 1974 at the age of 69. During the course of his life, he married once and fathered seven children. He created one of the first artificial fishing lures in 1936, which later became known as the Original Floater, a lure for which he would be made somewhat noted.

== Early life ==
Born in Sysmä, Rapala shared his home with evergreen forests and hundreds of lakes. At the age of seven, his mother Mari and he moved to the parish of Asikkala, around 116 kilometres (72 mi) from the capital Helsinki. The clergymen at the parish could not remember Mari's surname, Saarinen, and so he simply put it as Rapala, the village in Sysmä municipality from which they had moved. 'Rapa' is one of the Finnish words for "mud." Finnish children of this time were generally put to work as soon as they became capable, and Rapala did the same.

Rapala met Elma Leppänen when he was in his early twenties, and they married in 1928. They lived in her parents' house in Riihilahti until 1933. Europe's economy was in a downturn during this period, and it worsened as the effects of the Great Depression in America arrived in Europe. He worked as a lumberjack during the winter, and a farmer's hand or commercial fisherman in summer. Lauri and Elma had seven children: five sons (Reino, Risto, Ensio, Esko, and Kauko) and two daughters (Marja and Irja).

== Early fishing work ==
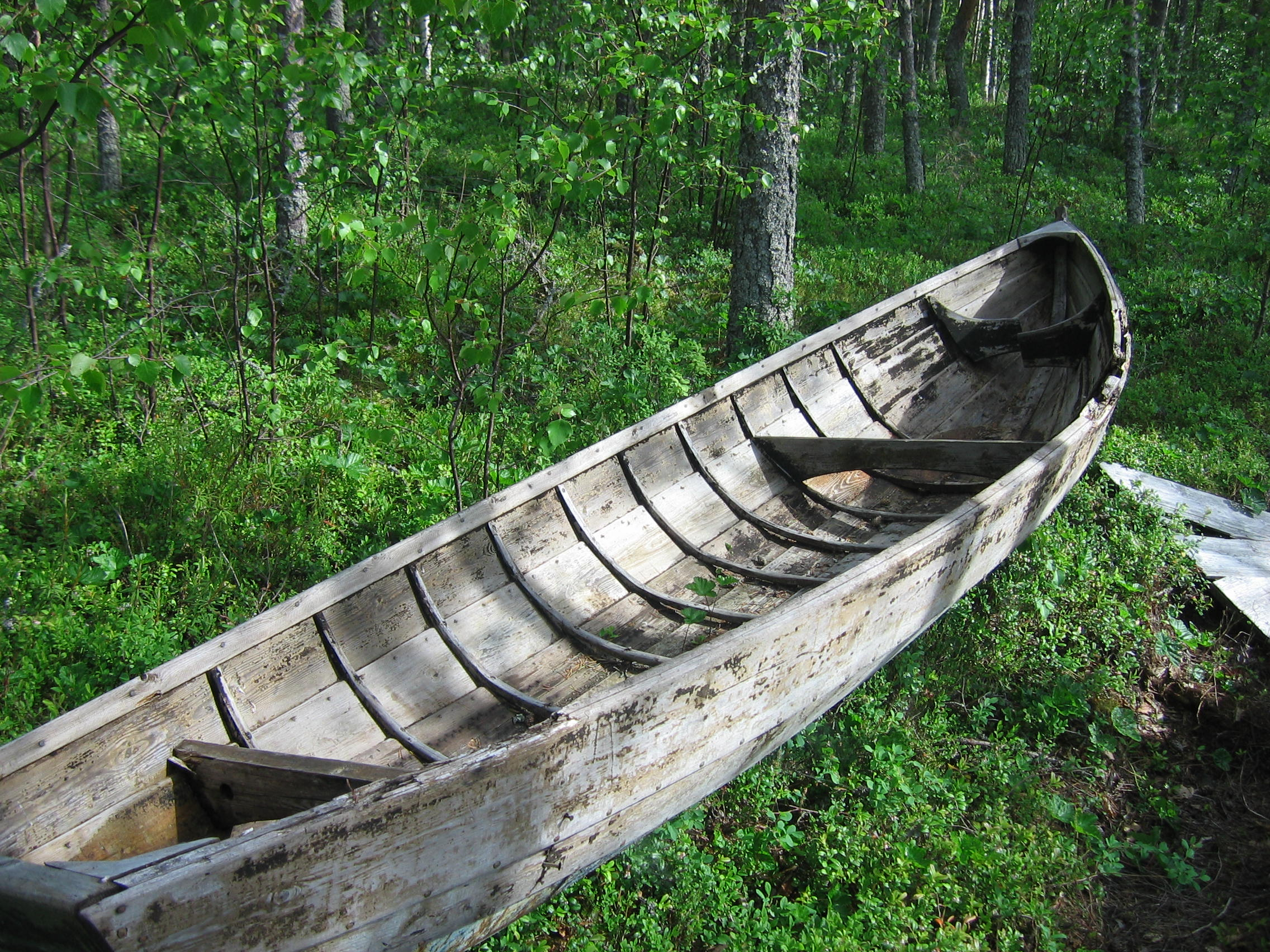
An old and forgotten traditional Finnish wooden rowing boat, or 'soutuvene', in Utajärvi, Finland

For fishing, he netted whitefish and set long lines for perch and pike. Three trout weighing 3.6 kilograms (8 lb) earned the equivalent of two weeks' pay in a factory nearby; so Rapala would also troll a line with a baited hook to catch trout. He trolled about a thousand hooks on a trotline behind his traditional Finnish fishing rowing boat, known in Finnish as a 'soutuvene'. He baited all the hooks himself, and since he had no motor for his boat, he rowed approximately 50 kilometres (31 mi) every day, except in storms.

According to the recollection of his son Risto, Lauri Rapala fished for trout with a homemade fishing rod. When a fish hit, he would throw his pole in the water and row behind it to tire the fish. With so much time on the water, Rapala had much time to think, to observe, and to learn how the fish behaved, how the minnows swam, and how the injured minnows were more likely to be eaten by the larger fish. "Our father really understood fishing," says Risto. "He recognized the relationship between bottom structure and where fish are located. He learned how fish fed, and how they moved from one location to another. And Rapala understood the effects of weather on fishing."

== Designing the original lure ==
Rapala thought that an artificial lure could bring in more fish, and therefore more money, in addition to eliminating the time needed to bait hooks. After a lot of trial and error, and with the help of a hermit-fisherman, Toivo Pylväläinen, who lived on an island of Lake Päijänne, and Rapala's friend Akseli Soramäki, he created a lure with the right wobble to imitate an injured bait fish. It was made of cork, with tinfoil around it and melted photograph negatives as a coating instead of lacquer, which Rapala could not afford. When completed, he tied a string to his thumb and trolled it behind his boat. Pike and perch attacked it voraciously, and his sons, who were young at the time, claim he would often bring in 270 kilograms (600 lb) a day. This is the lure that would become the Original Floater, the most well-known fishing lure in the world.

== Rising popularity and improving production ==
When World War II broke out in Europe in 1939, shortages arose, and Rapala began making his lures from tree bark. During the war, his lure achieved some promotion. Dynamite was sometimes used to obtain fish, but Rapala said his lure would produce more fish. He and his friends had a contest, and he outfished what had been "caught" with dynamite, catching 78 fish in a few hours.

After the war, demand for his lures increased, so he enlisted the help of his sons, teaching them the art of making the lures. Ensio did so well on one that he achieved a national craftsmanship award for it. Elma handled bookkeeping and wrote and designed promotional copy for the lure boxes. They developed machines to improve efficiency and quality of the lures, to have them sanded and polished, and to make identical lure bodies. To make sure all the lures ran just right, Rapala insisted that all lures be tank tested and viewed by him for final approval.
