= Peruvesi =

Lake in Finland

- Location within Finland
- Location: Pertunmaa
- Coordinates: 61°29′N 26°33′E
- Primary inflows: Pankajoki river, lake Pienivesi
- Primary outflows: Volankoski rapids, Volanjoki river, lake Saittalampi
- Catchment area: Kymijoki
- Basin countries: Finland
- Surface area: 16.088 km^{2} (6.212 sq mi)
- Average depth: 5.86 m (19.2 ft)
- Max. depth: 23 m (75 ft)
- Water volume: 0.0943 km^{3} (76,500 acre⋅ft)
- Shore length^{1}: 58.59 km (36.41 mi)
- Surface elevation: 104 m (341 ft)
- Frozen: December–April
- Islands: Honkasaari, Konnesaari, Nuottisaaret
- ^{1} Shore length is not a well-defined measure.

Peruvesi is a medium-sized lake in the Kymijoki main catchment area. It is located in the region Southern Savonia, near the church village of Pertunmaa in the municipality of Pertunmaa, Finland.

== See also ==
- List of lakes in Finland
