= European route E63 =

Road in trans-European E-road network

E63

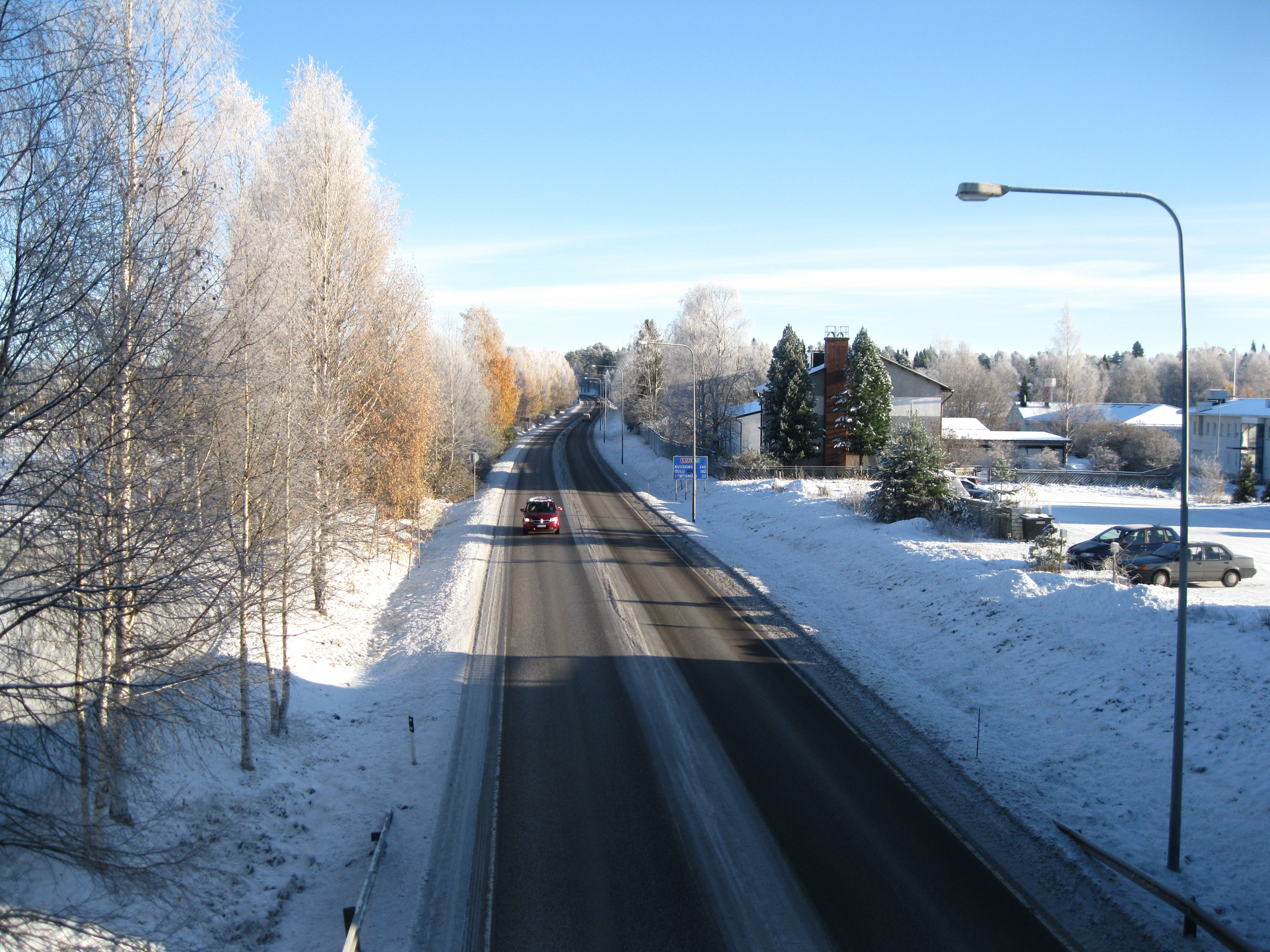
- The road in Kajaani.

Route information
- Length: 1,126 km (700 mi)

Major junctions
- North end: Sodankylä
- South end: Turku

Location
- Countries: Finland

Highway system
- International E-road network; A Class; B Class

The European route E 63 is a European route that goes from Sodankylä, Finland to Turku, Finland. The length of the route is 1,126 kilometres (700 mi).

- E 63: Sodankylä – Pelkosenniemi – Kemijärvi – Isokylä – Kuusamo – Suomussalmi – Kajaani – Iisalmi – Kuopio – Vehmasmäki – Suonenjoki – Laukaa – Jyväskylä – Jämsä – Orivesi – Tampere – Akaa – Loimaa – Turku

The E63 is the only European route that runs entirely in Finland. It follows Finnish national highway 5 between Sodankylä and Kuopio and highway 9 between Kuopio and Turku.
