= Sysmä =

- Municipality
- Sysmän kunta Sysmä kommun
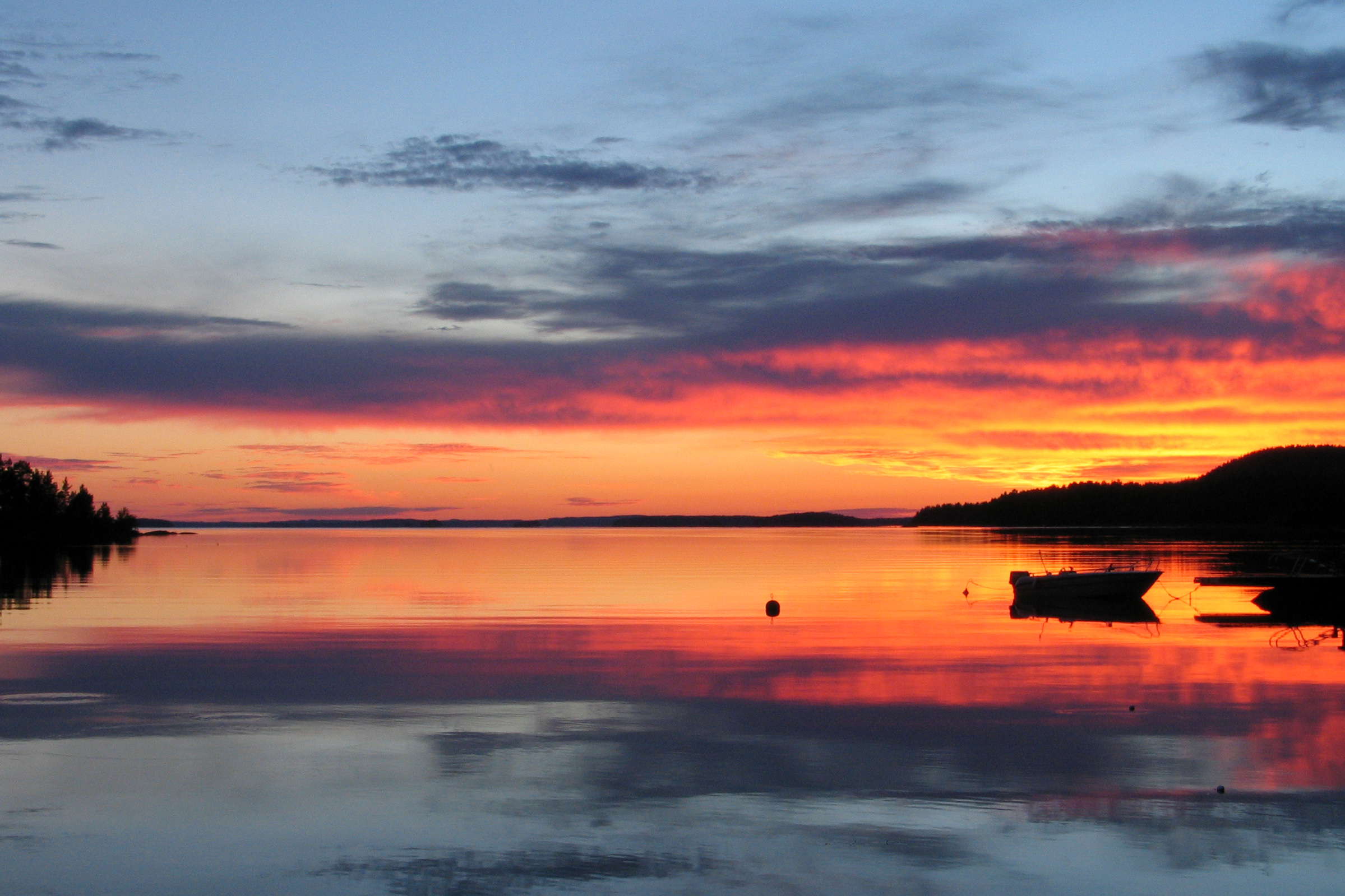
- Sunset at Lake Päijänne and Päijätsalo natural park

- Coat of arms

- Location of Sysmä in Finland
- Interactive map of Sysmä
- Coordinates: 61°30′N 025°41′E
- Country: Finland
- Region: Päijät-Häme
- Sub-region: Heinola
- Founded: 1442

Government
  - Municipal manager: Marketta Kitkiöjoki

Area (2018-01-01)
  - Total: 936.18 km^{2} (361.46 sq mi)
  - Land: 666.76 km^{2} (257.44 sq mi)
  - Water: 269.14 km^{2} (103.92 sq mi)
  - Rank: 128th largest in Finland

Population (2025-12-31)
  - Total: 3,367
  - Rank: 204th largest in Finland
  - Density: 5.05/km^{2} (13.1/sq mi)

Population by native language
  - Finnish: 95.8% (official)
  - Swedish: 0.3%
  - Others: 3.9%

Population by age
  - 0 to 14: 8.3%
  - 15 to 64: 48.4%
  - 65 or older: 43.2%
- Time zone: UTC+02:00 (EET)
  - Summer (DST): UTC+03:00 (EEST)
- Website: sysma.fi

Sysmä (Finnish pronunciation: [ˈsysmæ]) is a municipality of Finland. It is situated in the Päijät-Häme region. The municipality has a population of 3,367 (31 December 2025) and covers an area of 936.18 square kilometres (361.46 sq mi) of which 269.14 km^{2} (103.92 sq mi) is water. The population density is 5.05 inhabitants per square kilometre (13.1/sq mi). Neighbouring municipalities are Asikkala, Hartola, Heinola, Kuhmoinen, Luhanka, and Padasjoki. The municipality speaks Finnish.

The newspaper Itä-Häme is established in Sysmä.

According to historians, the word sysmä means either a "dark forest" or an "uninhabited wilderness." Sysmä is also the name of a lake in Joroinen and another lake in Ilomantsi.

== History ==
The first settlers in the area came from Sääksmäki, as evidenced by village names such as Voipala in Sysmä, which is named after Voipaala in Sääksmäki. Rapala may also be named after Rapola.

Sysmä was first mentioned in 1442, when it was already a separate parish. Jämsä was separated from it on the same year. Sysmä was a large parish, though most of its northern lands lacked a permanent population. The northern parts were eventually settled by Savonians and in 1561, the area became the Rautalampi parish which included most of modern Central Finland north of the Päijänne; from Toivakka to Pihtipudas.

The original dialect spoken in Sysmä was a Tavastian dialect. It was replaced by a Savonian dialect soon after Ivar Tawast killed 400 peasants from Sysmä, Jämsä and Kuhmoinen in Padasjoki during the Cudgel War. Many farms in Sysmä were left without owners, so they were taken by Savonian settlers.

Sysmä was also occasionally known in documents as Sysmäki due to association with the word mäki (hill), compare Kärsämäki which used to be Kärsämä.

Hartola was a part of Sysmä until 1784. At the time, the Hartola parish also included Joutsa, Luhanka, Leivonmäki and the western part of Pertunmaa.

== Population ==
Sysmä has suffered chronic, steady population decline over the last 50 years. It has many alternative homes, used principally as holiday homes.

== Villages ==
Joutsjärvi, Karilanmaa, Kinnarila, Koivisto, Liikola, Nikkaroinen, Nuoramoinen, Onkiniemi, Otamo, Rapala, Ravioskorpi, Taipale, Unaja, Valittula, and Vintturi.

== Attractions ==
Many summer events are held in Sysmä during which the population could even triple seasonally.

- One of the most popular events is called Sysmän suvisoitto.
- Kammiovuori mountain where is seven meters high glacial erratic Sysmän Linta
- Another glacial erratic in Sysmä is Onkiniemen liikkuva kivi.

== Notable people ==
- Pekka Streng, musician
- Olavi Virta, singer
- Lauri Rapala, founder of Rapala
- Onni Schildt, politician
- Ernst Tandefelt, Swedo-Finnish nobleman and assassin
