= Kuortti =

- Village
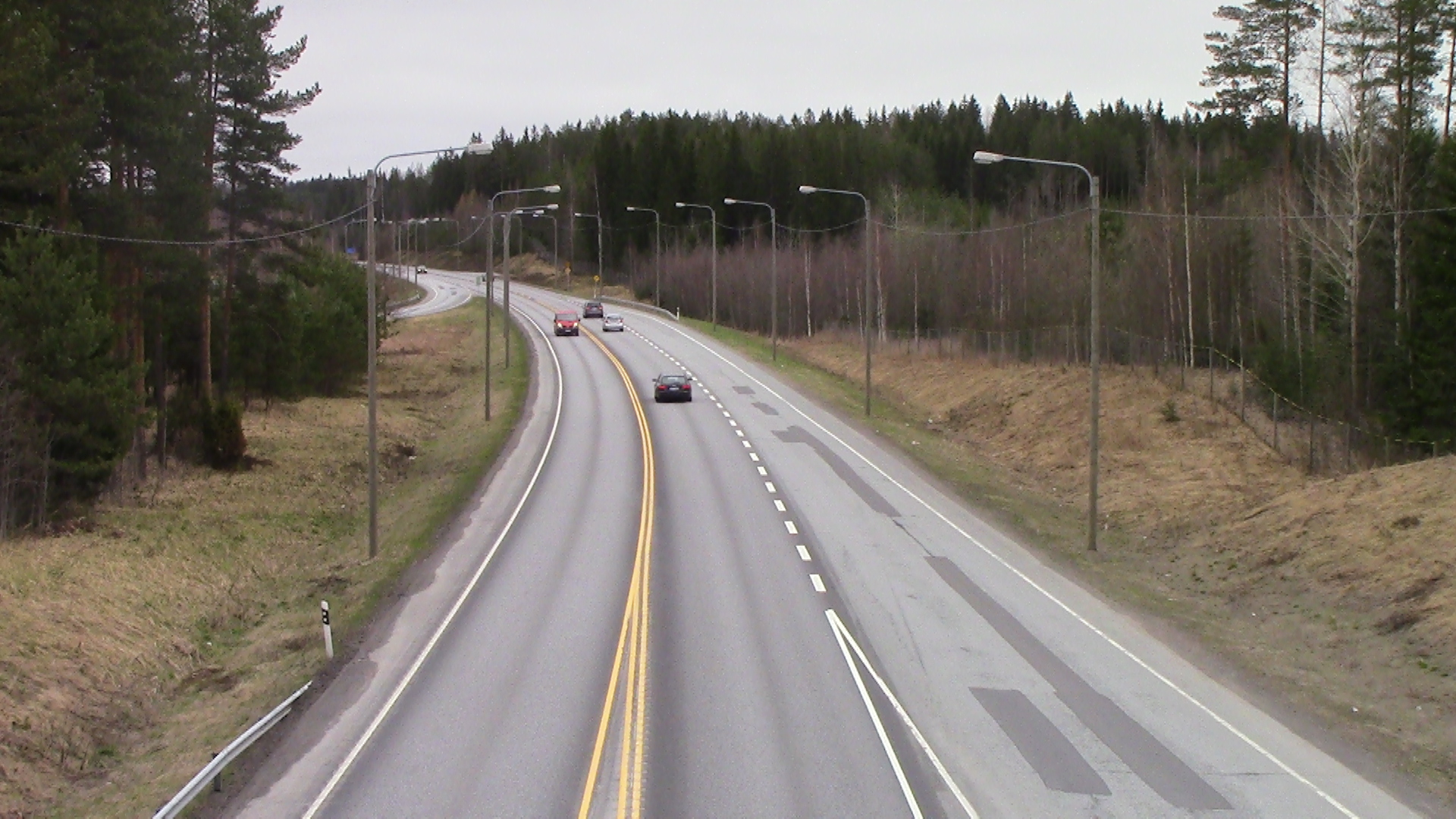
- The Main road 5 at Kuortti

- Location in Finland
- Country: Finland
- Region: Southern Savonia
- Municipality: Mäntyharju

Area
  - Urban: 186 km^{2} (72 sq mi)

Population (2018-12-31)
  - Village: 252
  - Density: 1,355/km^{2} (3,510/sq mi)
- Time zone: UTC+2 (EET)
  - Summer (DST): UTC+3 (EEST)
- Postal code: 19410

Kuortti (Finnish pronunciation: [ˈkuo̯rtːi]) is a village in the eastern part of the Mäntyharju municipality in Southern Savonia. Together with Pertunmaa's church village, it was one of the main settlement centers of the former Pertunmaa municipality until 2025. Kuortti has a population of 252. The village is located near the main road between Heinola and Mikkeli. The distance from Kuortti to Pertunmaa's church village is about 12 kilometres.
