= Hartola Church =

Coordinates: 61.5788°N 26.0203°E

- Hartolan kirkko Gustav Adolfs kyrka
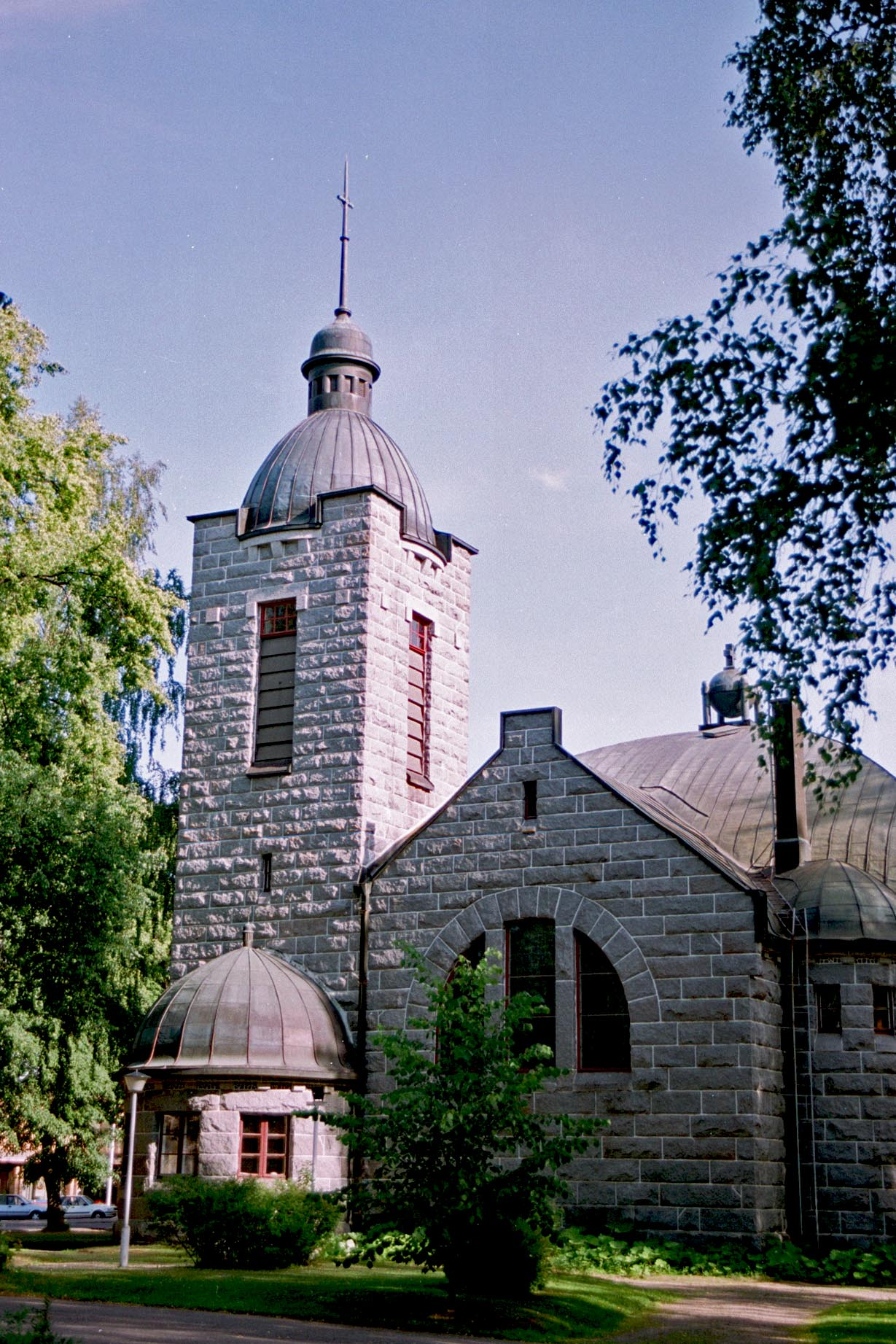
- Hartola Church in July 2006
- Hartola Church
- Location: Hartola
- Country: Finland
- Denomination: ELCF

Hartola Church (Finnish: Hartolan kirkko, Swedish: Gustav Adolfs kyrka) is a church building in Hartola, Finland.

Construction began in 1911, and the church was opened on 16 December 1913. The architect was Josef Stenbäck.

== See also ==
- Pertunmaa Church
