= Peltonen (company) =

Finnish ski brand

- Company type: Subsidiary
- Industry: Sports equipment
- Founded: 1945; 81 years ago in Hartola, Finland
- Founder: Toivo Peltonen
- Headquarters: Heinola, Finland
- Products: Cross country skis, poles
- Parent: Rapala
- Website: www.peltonenski.fi

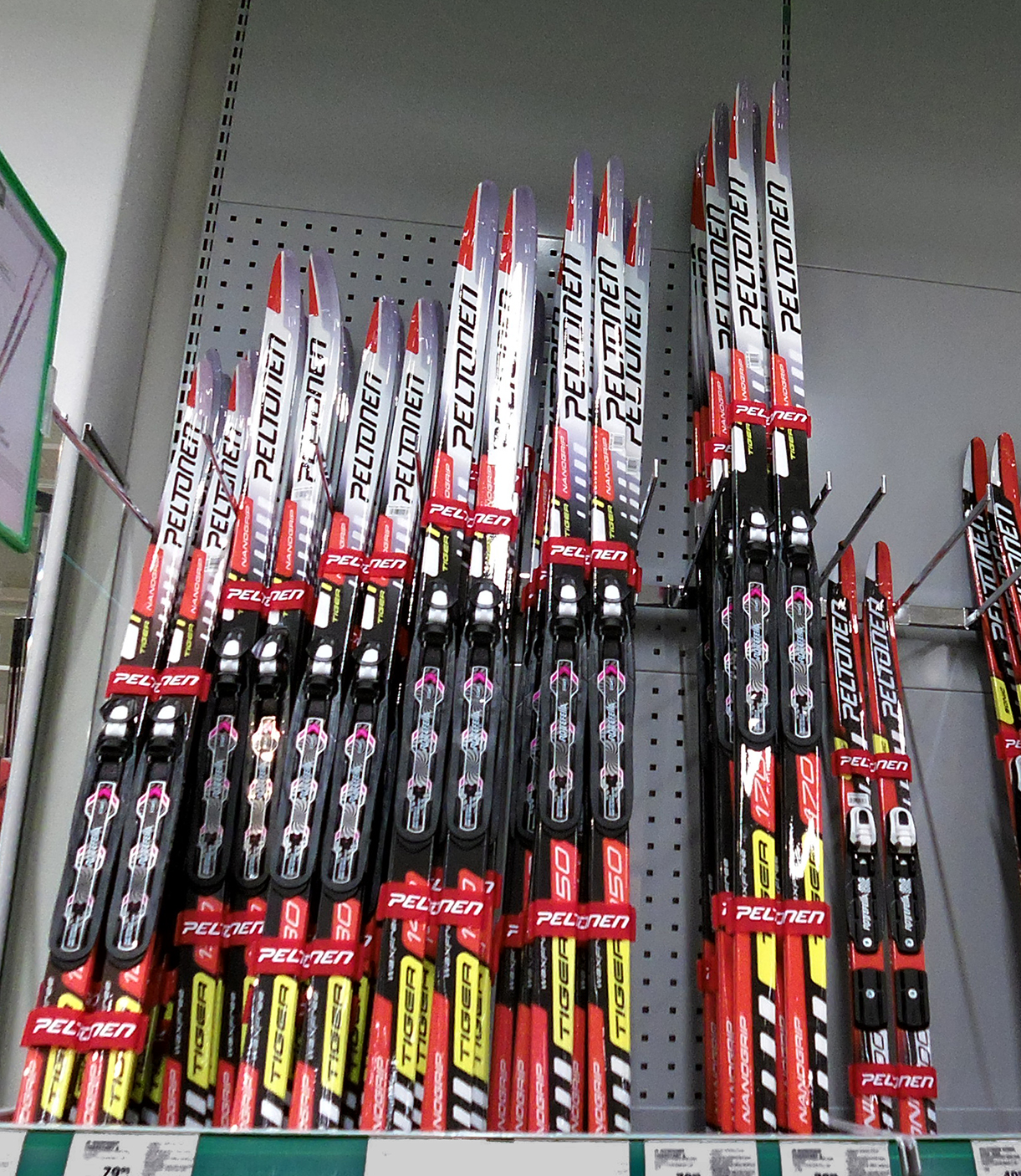
Peltonen cross country skis

Peltonen is a Finnish manufacturer of cross country skis, ski boots and poles.

Peltonen skis are manufactured in Finland at the Peltonen factory in Heinola.

Since 2002, the Peltonen brand has been owned by Normark, the Finnish distributor for the Rapala corporation. In 2005 Rapala also acquired the majority of shares in Peltonen Ski Oyj.

== See also ==
- Järvinen skis
