= Salpaus Further Education =

College in the Lahti Region, Finland

- Established: 2001
- Principal: Päivi Saarelainen
- Students: 14,000
- Location: Lahti, Asikkala, Heinola, Hollola, Nastola and Orimattila, Finland
- Website: http://www.salpaus.fi/

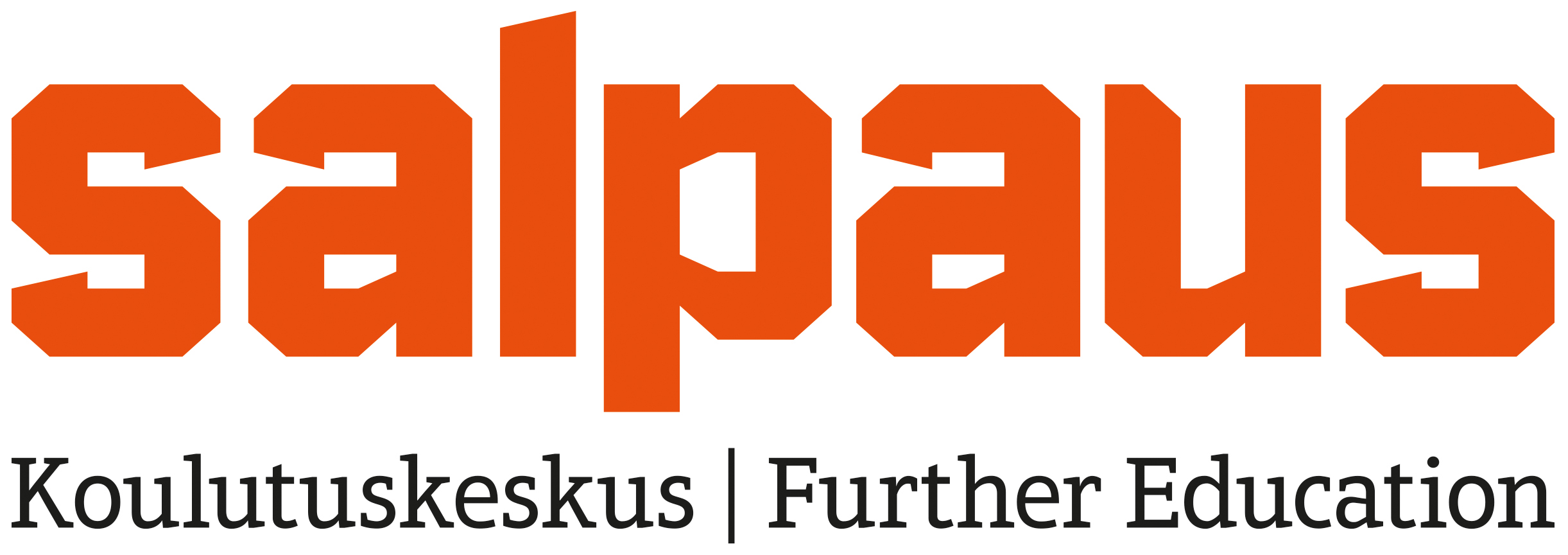

Salpaus Further Education (Koulutuskeskus Salpaus or Salpaus) is a regional college providing vocational education and training, staff development services and general upper secondary education in the Lahti region, Päijät-Häme region, Finland. Salpaus operates in six different locations, in Lahti, Asikkala, Heinola, Hollola, Nastola and Orimattila.

Salpaus provides vocational upper-secondary and adult education and training in the fields defined by the Ministry of Education:

- Culture
- Humanities and education
- Natural resources and the environment
- Natural sciences
- Social science, business and administration
- Social services, health and sport
- Technology, communication and transport
- Tourism, catering and domestic services

Salpaus Further Education is an independent division of Lahti Region Educational Consortium with divisions of Lahti University of Applied Sciences and Tuoterengas. Salpaus Further Education employs approximately 640 teachers and other staff.

== Fields of Study ==
Agriculture	Fishing industry	Music
Animal Care	Food Industry	Preparatory education for vocational education VALMA
Arts and Design	Hairdressing and Beauty Care	Process Manufacturing
Building services engineering	Health and Social Services	Product Manufacturing
Business and Administration	Horse Care and Management	Real Estate Services
Carpentry	Immigrant Training	Safety and Security
Circus	Information and Communication Technology, ICT	Supply Technician
Clothing	Interior Decoration and Design	Surface Treatment Technology
Construction	Laboratory Technology	Technical Design
Cooking	Logistics	Tourism
Economics	Mechanical Engineering	Vehicle Technology
Electrical Engineering and Automation	Media	Wood Processing
Environment	Metalwork and Machinery	Youth and Leisure Instruction
