= Original Floater =

Fishing lure

Rapala Original Floater in Clown Pattern

The Original Floater is a wobbler type of fishing lure, manufactured by Rapala. It is modeled after the first lure created by founder Lauri Rapala, in Finland in 1936. That prototype was made of cork wrapped in tinfoil and covered in melted film negatives as a cheap alternative to lacquer.

The original floater is made in seven different sizes and fourteen different colors. It can be found in many anglers' tackle boxes, and is the best-selling lure Rapala makes.

The lure, when retrieved, swims with an action that mimics that of a wounded baitfish. It was designed this way by Lauri Rapala, because of his observations as a boy and young man of the behaviors of minnows and fish in lakes near his home in Finland, where he noticed that in a school of minnows, an injured minnow swimming with an odd wobble made it the target of a larger fish looking for a meal.

After seeing this, he crafted this lure, with the help of some of his friends, originally to help him catch more fish without having to constantly rebait the thousands of hooks he had used to catch pike and perch. But his lures, being quite good at catching fish compared to conventional methods of the time, made its way around the world, increasing in popularity, so that the whole Rapala family had to help with creating these lures. Lauri's sons learned to make the lures, and became so skilled that one of his sons, Ensio, won a national craftsmanship award for his lure. The same son also invented a machine to help mass production of this lure.
