= Pertunmaa (village) =

Pertunmaan kirkonkylä
- Municipal centre
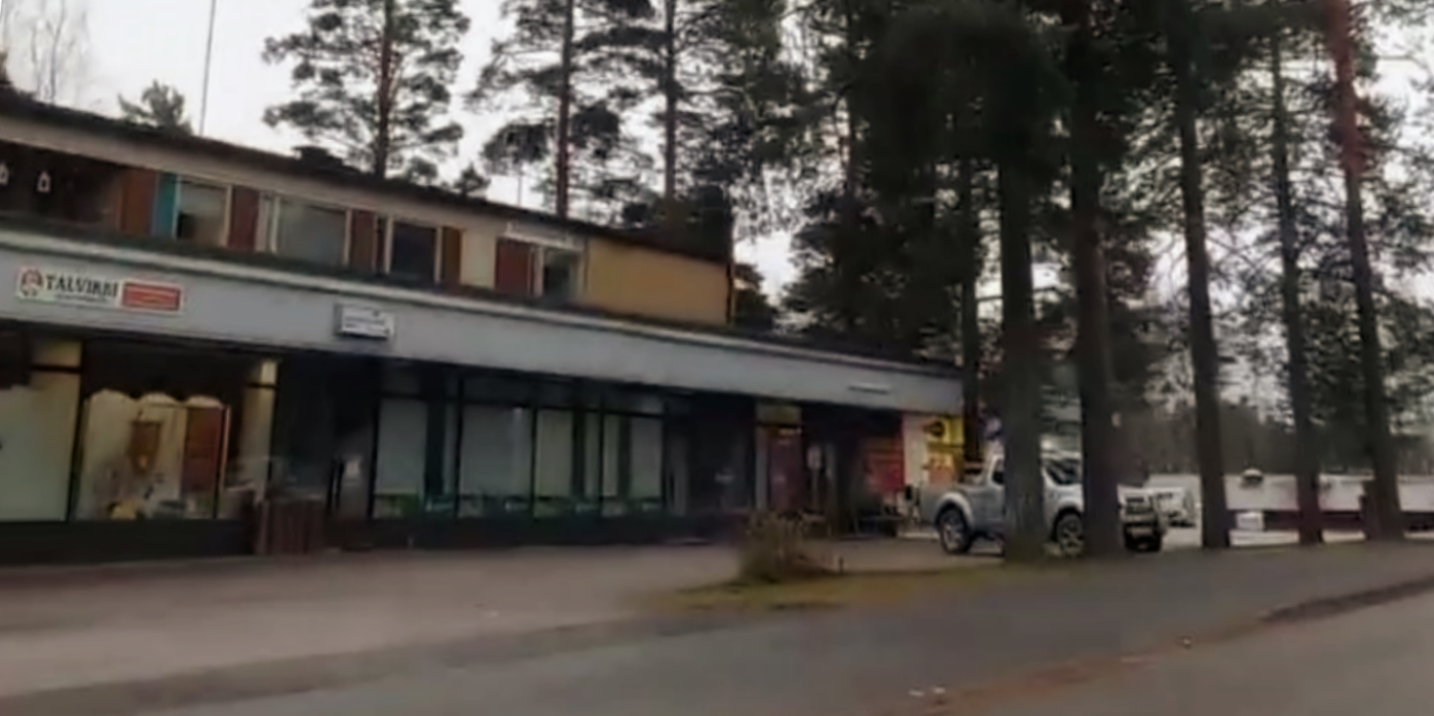

- Location in Finland
- Country: Finland
- Region: Southern Savonia
- Municipality: Pertunmaa

Area
  - Urban: 204 km^{2} (79 sq mi)

Population (2020-12-31)
  - Municipal centre: 439
  - Density: 2,152/km^{2} (5,570/sq mi)
- Time zone: UTC+2 (EET)
  - Summer (DST): UTC+3 (EEST)
- Postal code: 19430

Pertunmaan kirkonkylä (lit. 'Pertunmaa church village') is the largest urban area and the administrative center of the Pertunmaa municipality in Southern Savonia. Together with the southern Kuortti village, it is one of the main settlement centers of the municipality. In 2020, it had a population of 439. It is located between two large lakes, Pienijärvi and Peruvesi.

The most significant buildings include the Pertunmaa Church, the wooden cross church built in 1929. The settlement also has a municipal office, Osuuspankki bank, a fire department, a health center, a comprehensive school (grades 0–9) and two grocery stores.

Traditional Pertun päivät summer events are organized in Pertunmaa every year.
