= Pertunmaa Church =

Church in Pertunmaa, Finland

Coordinates: 61°30′06.7″N 026°28′36.8″E

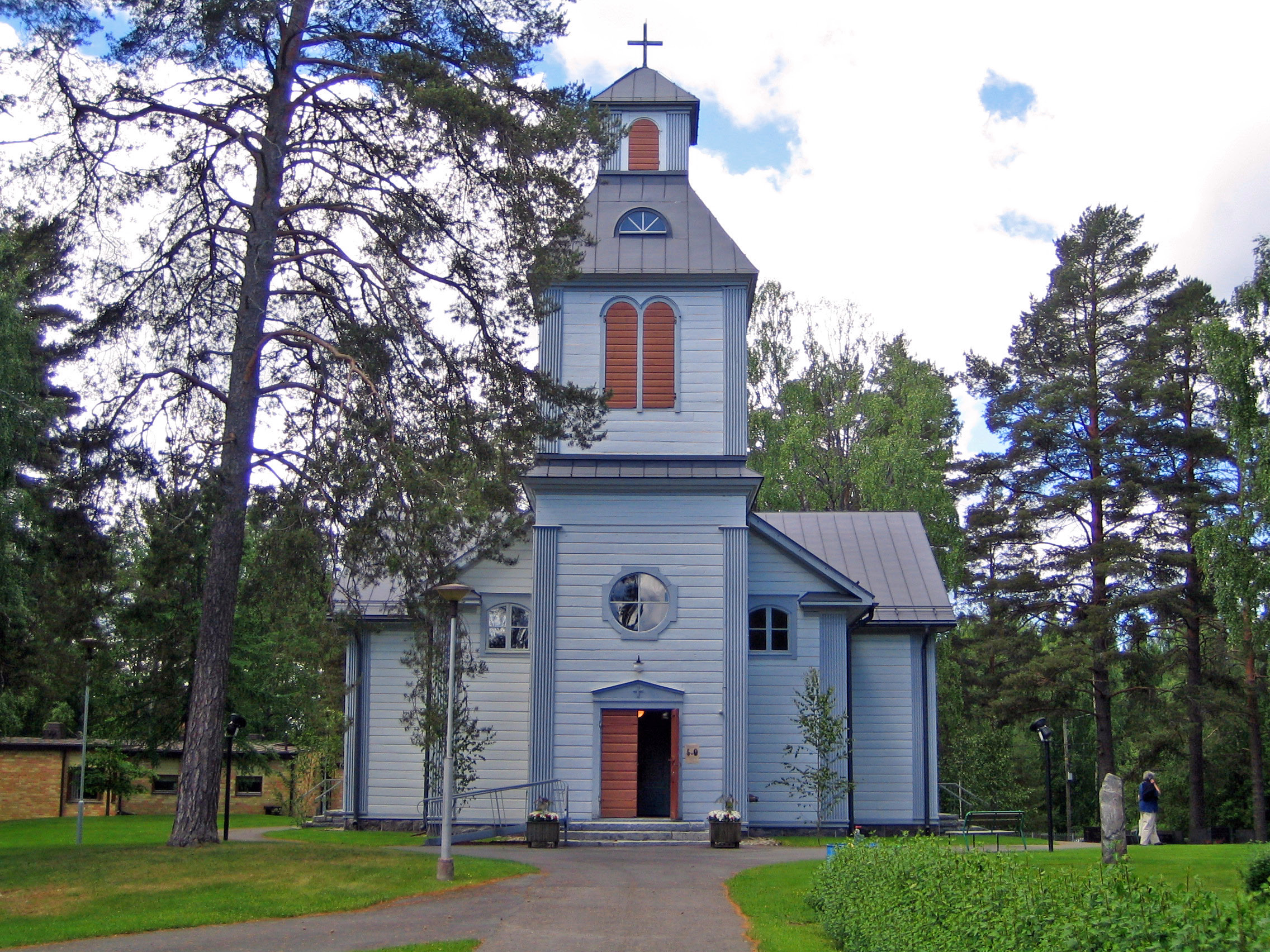
Exterior of the church

Pertunmaa Church (Finnish: Pertunmaan kirkko) is a short-towered wooden church in Pertunmaa, Finland, built according to the drawings of master builder Matti Vihonen in 1929. The church covers an area of 400 square meters and has seating for 400 people. The church was built partly from the logs of the old church of Hartola and in the same shape. The tower is built from the belfry of Hartola Church, but in a different shape. It has three floors and a lantern with a tent roof at the top. The two bells of the church were obtained from the former Russian military church in Mikkeli in 1924. The church has rounded windows at the ends and pilasters at the corners of the building; the outer ceilings have saddle ceilings. The interior is a wooden arch; the inner walls are on a log surface. The church was renovated in 1958. The altarpiece called "Jesus blessing the children" was painted by Albert Carlsson.

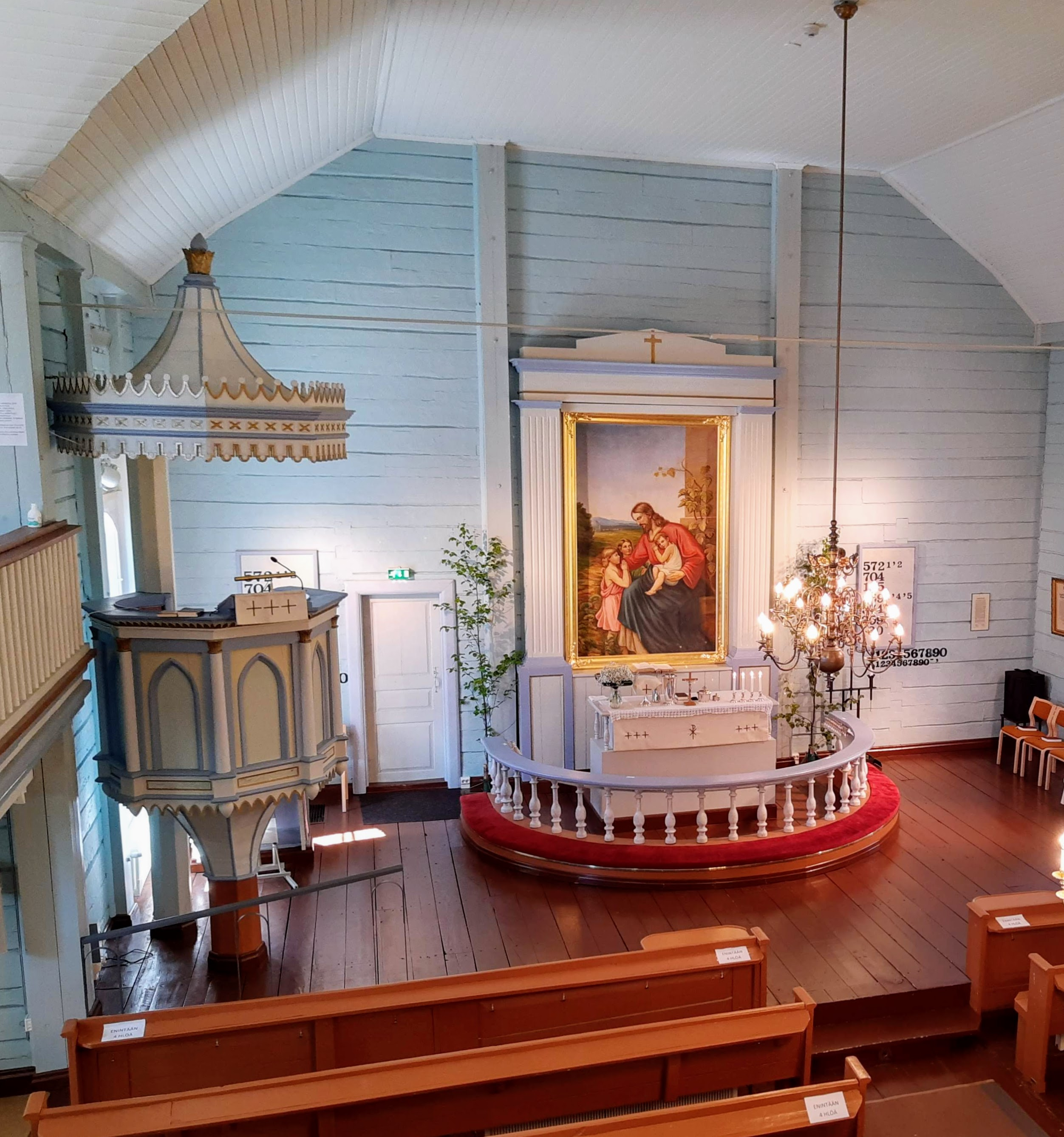
Interior of the church

In 1925, architect Alvar Aalto drew up two plans for the Pertunmaa Church, which were not implemented. The parish of Hartola donated its old church and belfry, built in 1684–1693, to the people of Pertunmaa. The buildings were not demolished in Pertunmaa until years later, at the end of 1927 and the beginning of 1928, despite the opposition of Hartola-based writer Maila Talvio. The demolished logs and the preacher room built in Pertunmaa in 1907, which also served as a temporary church, were turned into a church building so that the preacher room formed the nave of the church. The transfer took place with the help of horses, 300 loads. The pulpit was carried by the housekeeper Johan Abel Tuomaala.

The church's 15-voice pipe organ was manufactured by Urkurakentamo Tuomi in 1982.

== See also ==
- Hartola Church
- Pertunmaa (village)
