= Onni Schildt =

Finnish politician (1851–1913)

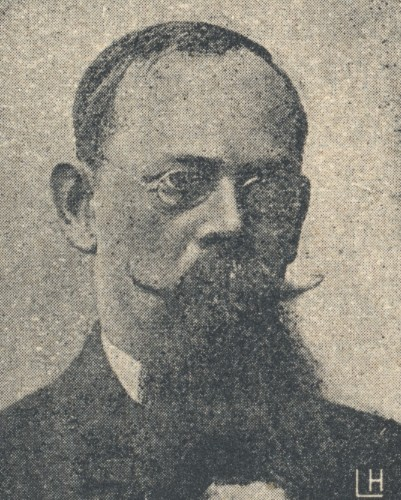
Onni Schildt

Wolmar Onni Schildt (3 July 1851 – 23 April 1913) was a Finnish politician. He was a member of the Senate of Finland and an agricultural extension practitioner.

Schildt was born in Jyväskylä. His parents were district doctor Wolmar Styrbjörn Schildt-[Kilpinen] and Mathilda Fredrika Wilhelmina Wadenstjerna. He graduated from secondary school in 1870 and attended the Alnarp Agricultural College in 1875. Schildt was the head of the dairy and animal husbandry school in Hovila from 1879 to 1903, an inspector of the Mikkeli Provincial Offices 1889–1899, and a Senate Finance Officer, Senator and Head of Agriculture, Mechelin and Hjelt in 1905–1909.

He owned Hovila manor in Sysmä in 1876–1913.

Schildt was a member of the Knighthood and Nobility in 1882, 1885, 1894, 1897, 1899 and 1904–1906 in the State Legislature.

He was the supervisor of the Agricultural Association of East Häme and of the Mikkeli County Agricultural Society.

Onni Schildt married Mathilda Natalia Fredrika Tigerstedt in 1876.
