= Itä-Häme =

Finnish newspaper

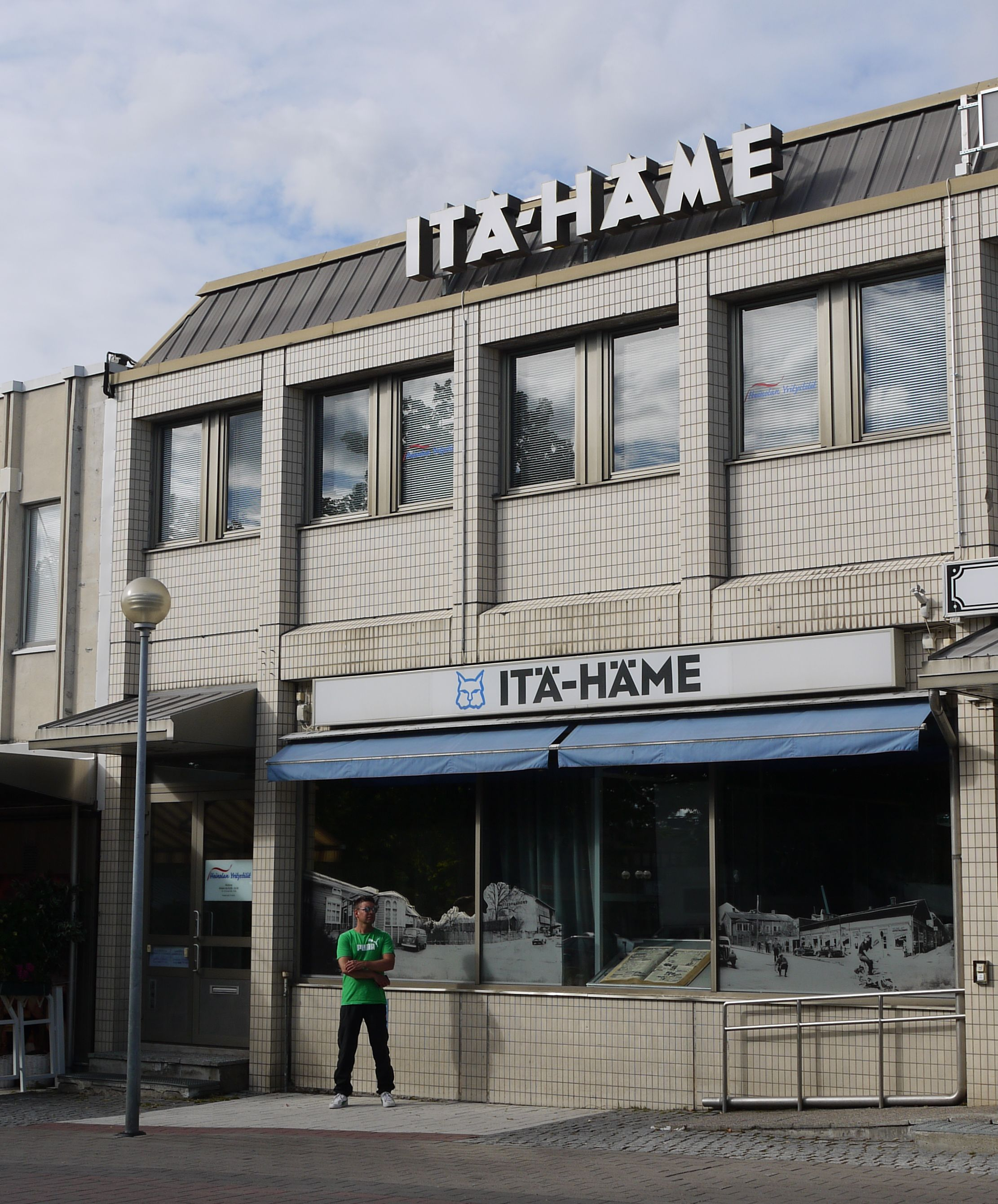
- Office building of Itä-Häme in Heinola, 2015
- Type: Newspaper
- Format: Tabloid
- Owner: ESS
- Editor-in-chief: Jari Niemi
- Founded: 1927; 99 years ago
- Language: Finnish
- Circulation: 10,427 (2011)
- Website: Itä-Häme

Itä-Häme is a morning tabloid newspaper published in Heinola in Itä-Häme, Finland.

== History and profile ==
Itä-Häme was established 1927 in Sysmä. The newspaper is headquartered in Lahti. It is part of the ESS company. Its chief editor is Jari Niemi. The paper is published six times per week. Its format was broadsheet until 2005 when the paper began to be published in tabloid format. It is the first Finnish newspaper which institutionalized the post of civic reporter in 2004.

The circulation of Itä-Häme in 2001 was 13,900 copies, decreasing to 12,000 copies in 2006, 10,719 copies in 2010, and 10,427 copies in 2011.
