= Lake Sysmä (Ilomantsi) =

Lake in Ilomantsi, Finland

- Location within Finland
- Location: Ilomantsi
- Coordinates: 62.7007°N 31.2795°E
- Lake type: Natural
- Catchment area: Vuoksi
- Basin countries: Finland
- Surface area: 11,827 km^{2} (4,566 sq mi)
- Average depth: 3.09 m (10.1 ft)
- Max. depth: 8.8 m (29 ft)
- Water volume: 00,365 km^{3} (88 cu mi)
- Shore length^{1}: 43 km (27 mi)
- Surface elevation: 1,512 m (4,961 ft)
- Frozen: December–April
- Islands: Lammassaari, Korpisaari
- ^{1} Shore length is not a well-defined measure.

Lake Sysmä (Finnish: Sysmä) is a medium-sized lake in the Vuoksi main catchment area, in the Northern Karelia region of eastern Finland. It is situated in the municipality of Ilomantsi.

The largest islands are Lammassaari, Korpisaari, Veitsisaari and Kokkosaari.

Sysmä is also the name of a municipality in the Päijänne Tavastia region, and Sysmä is also a lake in Joroinen.

== See also ==
- List of lakes in Finland
