= Asikkala =

- Municipality
- Asikkalan kunta Asikkala kommun
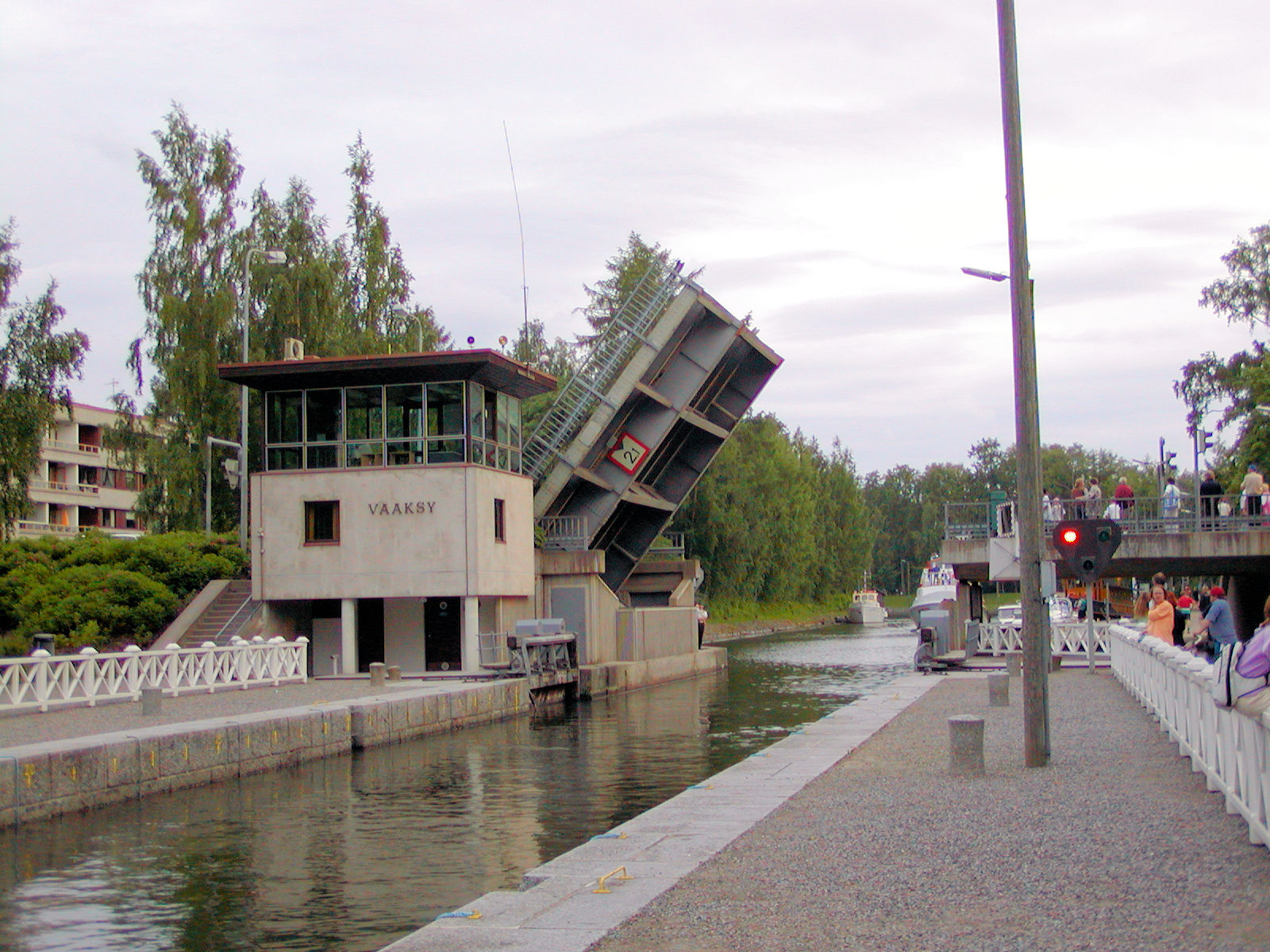
- Vääksy Canal

- Coat of arms

- Location of Asikkala in Finland
- Interactive map of Asikkala
- Coordinates: 61°10′20″N 025°32′50″E
- Country: Finland
- Region: Päijät-Häme
- Sub-region: Lahti
- Charter: 1848
- Seat: Vääksy

Government
  - Municipal manager: Rinna Ikola-Norrbacka

Area (2018-01-01)
  - Total: 755.55 km^{2} (291.72 sq mi)
  - Land: 563.39 km^{2} (217.53 sq mi)
  - Water: 192.13 km^{2} (74.18 sq mi)
  - Rank: 151st largest in Finland

Population (2025-12-31)
  - Total: 7,841
  - Rank: 120th largest in Finland
  - Density: 13.92/km^{2} (36.1/sq mi)

Population by native language
  - Finnish: 96.1% (official)
  - Swedish: 0.1%
  - Others: 3.8%

Population by age
  - 0 to 14: 13.3%
  - 15 to 64: 52.7%
  - 65 or older: 34%
- Time zone: UTC+02:00 (EET)
  - Summer (DST): UTC+03:00 (EEST)
- Website: asikkala.fi

Asikkala (Finnish pronunciation: [ˈɑsikːɑlɑ]) is a municipality of Finland. Its seat is in Vääksy, at the shores of the Lake Päijänne. It is located in the province of Southern Finland and is part of the Päijät-Häme region. Asikkala's neighboring municipalities are Hämeenlinna, Heinola, Hollola, Lahti, Padasjoki and Sysmä.

The municipality has a population of 7,841 (31 December 2025) and covers an area of 755.55 square kilometres (291.72 sq mi) of which 192.13 km^{2} (74.18 sq mi) is water. The population density is 13.92 inhabitants per square kilometre (36.1/sq mi).

The municipality is unilingually Finnish, by law since 1996.

== History ==
The oldest prehistoric objects discovered in Asikkala, primarily tools, are presumed to date back to approximately 3000 BCE. The island of Kotasaari in the village of Kalkkinen has been a significant source of finds as well; the settlement on the island dates back to the Stone Age. In the Middle Age, the hunters populating the area of Asikkala made excursions towards the north on the Päijänne. The oldest villages in the municipality are presumed to be Kalkkinen as well as Anianpelto, the former of which also housed the largest estate in the area, known as Iisakkila or Kalkkinen.

Asikkala is mentioned in writing for the first time in a document concerning a border dispute with Sysmä in 1443. It is mentioned in 1445 as an administrative parish, whose subordinates in taxation included the villages of Viitaila, Asikkala and Urajärvi, and later Ruuhijärvi in modern-day Nastola. In the early 1600s, Asikkala became an independent chapel parish from the mother parish of Hollola.

== Geography ==
=== Villages ===
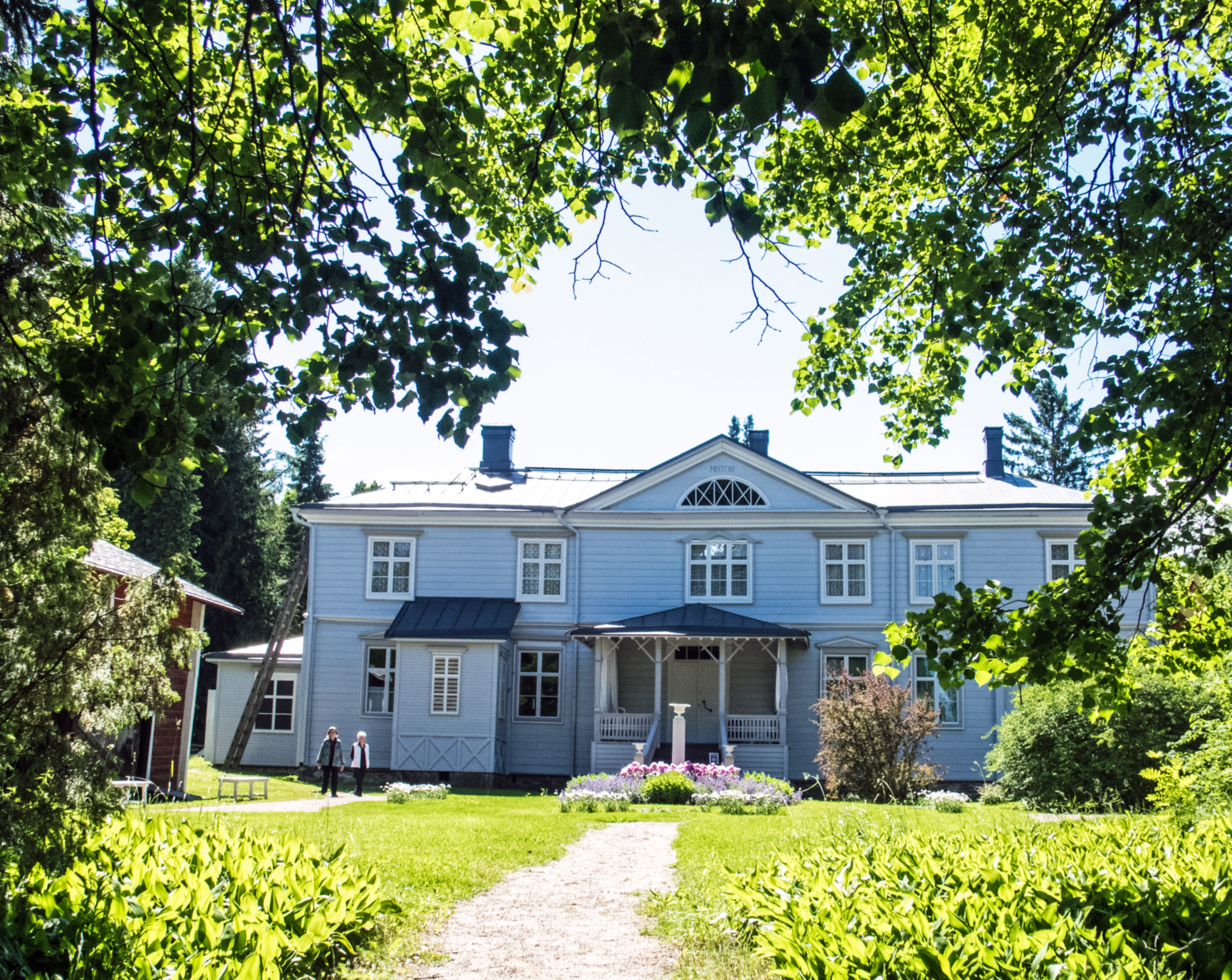
The Urajärvi Manor Museum

In 1967, Asikkala had 24 legally recognized villages (henkikirjakylät):

- Anianpelto
- Asikkala
- Hillilä
- Iso-Äiniö
- Joenniemi
- Kalkkinen
- Keltaniemi
- Kopsuo
- Kurhila
- Muikkula
- Myllykselä
- Paakkola
- Pulkkila
- Pätiälä
- Reivilä
- Riihilahti
- Salo
- Särkijärvi
- Urajärvi
- Vehkoo
- Vesivehmaa
- Viitaila
- Vähimaa
- Vähä-Äiniö

=== Climate ===
Asikkala has a humid continental climate (Dfb) with cold winters and mild to warm summers. The climate is slightly milder than the nearby city of Lahti due to influence from Lake Päijänne.

Climate data for Asikkala Pulkkilanharju (1991–2020 normals, extremes 1967–2026)
Month	Jan	Feb	Mar	Apr	May	Jun	Jul	Aug	Sep	Oct	Nov	Dec	Year
Record high °C (°F)	8.0 (46.4)	8.1 (46.6)	14.6 (58.3)	22.2 (72.0)	27.6 (81.7)	30.5 (86.9)	31.8 (89.2)	30.1 (86.2)	25.2 (77.4)	18.6 (65.5)	13.2 (55.8)	10.4 (50.7)	31.8 (89.2)
Mean daily maximum °C (°F)	−3.0 (26.6)	−3.5 (25.7)	1.0 (33.8)	7.1 (44.8)	14.1 (57.4)	18.6 (65.5)	21.2 (70.2)	19.7 (67.5)	14.2 (57.6)	7.9 (46.2)	2.7 (36.9)	−0.6 (30.9)	8.3 (46.9)
Daily mean °C (°F)	−5.5 (22.1)	−6.2 (20.8)	−2.5 (27.5)	2.8 (37.0)	9.5 (49.1)	14.6 (58.3)	17.6 (63.7)	16.1 (61.0)	11.4 (52.5)	5.6 (42.1)	1.0 (33.8)	−2.6 (27.3)	5.2 (41.4)
Mean daily minimum °C (°F)	−8.7 (16.3)	−9.9 (14.2)	−6.5 (20.3)	−0.9 (30.4)	5.3 (41.5)	11.0 (51.8)	14.1 (57.4)	13.2 (55.8)	8.8 (47.8)	3.8 (38.8)	−0.8 (30.6)	−4.9 (23.2)	2.0 (35.6)
Record low °C (°F)	−37.2 (−35.0)	−36.8 (−34.2)	−29.1 (−20.4)	−18.3 (−0.9)	−5.7 (21.7)	−0.6 (30.9)	4.9 (40.8)	2.3 (36.1)	−2.6 (27.3)	−10.6 (12.9)	−18.6 (−1.5)	−34.5 (−30.1)	−37.2 (−35.0)
Source 1: FMI climatological normals for Finland 1991-2020
Source 2: Record highs and lows 1967–2026

== Demographics ==
In 2020, 13.3% of the population of Asikkala was under the age of 15, 52.7% were aged 15 to 64, and 34.0% were over the age of 64. The average age was 49.9, above the national average of 43.4 and regional average of 46.1. Speakers of Finnish made up 97.4% of the population and speakers of Swedish made up 0.2%, while the share of speakers of foreign languages was 2.4%. Foreign nationals made up 1.8% of the total population.

The chart below, describing the development of the total population of Asikkala from 1975-2020, encompasses the municipality's area as of 2021.

Historical population

Year	Pop.	±% p.a.
1975	7,798	—
1980	8,251	+1.14%
1985	8,564	+0.75%
1990	8,822	+0.60%
1995	8,782	−0.09%

Year	Pop.	±% p.a.
2000	8,644	−0.32%
2005	8,560	−0.20%
2010	8,552	−0.02%
2015	8,287	−0.63%
2020	8,059	−0.56%

Source: Statistics Finland

=== Urban areas ===
In 2019, out of the total population of 8,083, 5,188 people lived in urban areas and 2,814 in sparsely populated areas, while the coordinates of 81 people were unknown. This made Asikkala's degree of urbanization 64.8%. The urban population in the municipality was divided between two urban areas as follows:

#	Urban area	Population
1	Vääksy	4,810
2	Lahti central locality	378 (Note: The Lahti central locality has a total population of 119,469, and in addition to Asikkala, reaches the municipalities of Lahti (103,990 residents) and Hollola (15,101 residents).)

=== Notable people ===
- James Hirvisaari (born 1960), politician
- J. R. Danielson-Kalmari (1853–1933), senator, professor and valtioneuvos
- Minna Kauppi (born 1982), orienteer
- Toni Nieminen (born 1975), ski jumper
- Aaro Pajari (1897–1949), Major General
- Karri Rämö (born 1986), ice hockey player
- Joel Rinne (1897–1981), actor
- Eetu Salin (1866–1919), politician, journalist and shoemaker

== Politics ==
Results of the 2011 Finnish parliamentary election in Asikkala:

- True Finns 26.8%
- Centre Party 20.8%
- National Coalition Party 20.5%
- Social Democratic Party 15.2%
- Christian Democrats 8.1%
- Left Alliance 4.0%
- Green League 3.7%

== Economy ==
In 2018, 9.6% of the workforce of Asikkala worked in primary production (agriculture, forestry and fishing), 28.7% in secondary production (e.g. manufacturing, construction and infrastructure), and 58.6% in services. In 2019, the unemployment rate was 9.2%, and the share of pensioners in the population was 37.4%.

The ten largest employers in Asikkala in 2019 were as follows:

1. Municipality of Asikkala, 303 employees
2. Päijät-Häme Health Care Municipal Consortium, 187 employees
3. JELD-WEN Suomi Oy, 95 employees
4. Rapala VMC Oyj, 77 employees
5. Salpaus Further Education, 37 employees
6. Regional Council of Päijät-Häme, 34 employees
7. Viipurilainen Kotileipomo Oy, 32 employees
8. Urajärven Metalli Oy, 30 employees
9. Parish of Asikkala, 22 employees
10. Osuuskauppa Hämeenmaa, 22 employees

== Culture ==
=== Food ===
In the 1980s, Asikkala's traditional parish dishes were salmon soup, rieskas made barley, and potato egg butter, as well as berry milk and sahti.

== See also ==
- Päijänne Tavastia Aviation Museum
