= Lake Sysmä (Joroinen) =

Lake in Joroinen, Finland

- Location within Finland
- Location: Joroinen
- Coordinates: 62°10′N 27°42′E
- Primary inflows: Kiekka power station
- Primary outflows: via Huutokoski to the lake Jokijärvi and Haukivesi
- Catchment area: Vuoksi
- Basin countries: Finland
- Surface area: 33.096 km^{2} (12.778 sq mi)
- Shore length^{1}: 167.22 km (103.91 mi)
- Surface elevation: 88 m (289 ft)
- Frozen: December-April
- Islands: Lamposaari, Kaupinsaari
- ^{1} Shore length is not a well-defined measure.

Lake Sysmä (Finnish: Sysmä) is a medium-sized lake in the Vuoksi main catchment area. It is located in the region Southern Savonia and the municipality of Joroinen.

There is about 260 islands in the lake, most notable are Uitonsaari, Kaupinsaari, Laasonsaari, Käpysaari and Lamposaari.

Sysmä is also a Finnish municipality which is situated in Päijänne Tavastia and a lake in Ilomantsi.

== See also ==
- List of lakes in Finland
