= Vehmasmäki =

Village in Kuopio, Finland

Vehmasmäki is a village in the town of Kuopio, Finland. It is located about 22 kilometres (14 mi) from the centre of Kuopio. The village has a population of about 500.

In Vehmasmäki, there is an animal park which is open every day in the summer.
