= Rapala =

Finnish fishing equipment manufacturer

Rapala VMC Corporation
- Type: Public
- Traded as: Nasdaq Helsinki: RAP1V
- Industry: Fishing
- Founded: 1936; 90 years ago in Finland
- Founder: Lauri Rapala
- Headquarters: Helsinki, Finland
- Area served: Worldwide
- Key people: Cyrille Viellard (CEO); Emmanuel Viellard (chairman)
- Products: Fishing lures, tools, knives, clothing, accessories
- Number of employees: Approximately 1,700 (2021)
- Subsidiaries: Sufix, Storm, Peltonen, Marttiini, among others
- Website: www.rapala.com

Rapala (/ˈræpəlɑː/ RAP-ə-lah) is a fishing product manufacturing company based in Finland. It was founded in 1936 by Lauri Rapala, who is credited for creating the world's first floating minnow lure carved from cork with a shoemaker's knife, covered with chocolate candy bar wrappers and melted photography film negatives, for a protective outer coating. His first fishing lure was created and designed for the purpose of catching pike. The floating minnow lure later, once the Rapala company was created, went on to become the first Rapala lure.

The company produces a similar lure today. The construction of the lure is similar to how they were originally built, with the exception that the core is made from balsa wood instead of cork, and the outer coating is now paint and lacquer. The original floating minnow, now called the No. 9 floater, is the company's most popular lure.

Rapala's lures are considered some of the world's leading baits and sold in 140 countries with Field & Stream ranking Rapala's Original Floating Minnow the third of the "best topwater lures ever created" in 2019.

Rapala's American subsidiary, Rapala USA, is based in Minnetonka, Minnesota. Design and development teams in the US and Finland work together to develop new lures or modify existing ones fishing tackle continues to evolve. The company still follows Lauri Rapala's practice of hand-testing each lure produced to make sure it performs as intended. Their products are sold direct-to-consumer via eCommerce as well as through retailers including Bass Pro Shops and Cabela's in the United States.

Rapala owns 100% of 13 Fishing (a group of brands primarily focused on anglers and fishing), and has exclusive rights to the Okuma fishing brand in Europe and Russia. They also sponsor a number of professional fishermen. Rapala CEO and President Nicolas Cederström Warchalowski believes Okuma acquisition will embark the group on a growth journey and he is also open for new acquisitions after the pan-European Okuma launch in 2022.

For the period of July–December 2020, the company's operating profit increased to €17.3 million, compared to the previous year's 5.8 million Euro, which it attributes to the COVID-19 pandemic.

== Product lines ==
Products made by Rapala include fishing lures, crankbaits, jigging lures, lipless crankbaits, surface poppers, filet knives, fishing rods, reels, braided fishing line, fishing and hunting knives, apparel and other fishing related products.

Brands of the Rapala VMC group include amongst others knife manufacturer Marttiini, lure brands Blue Fox and Storm, fishing line manufacturer Sufix and ski brand Peltonen.

== Company history ==
=== 1930–1950s: A family business ===
Rapala was founded in 1936 by Lauri Rapala. After having observed the habits of pike, Rapala noted that the fish would often target the slower and off-balanced prey fish. This observation led to the creation of the first Rapala lure, The Original. The lure was characterized by its slightly off-centred wobbling action, that imitated the movements of a wounded fish. Starting out as family business, Rapala was first catering to the needs of the local fishermen, with the family having to allocate time also to farming and fishing. Nevertheless, the word about the lures started getting around, and in 1938 a local co-operative store in Kalkkinen started selling Rapala lures, marking the first commercial breakthrough for the company. After the Winter War, and the Continuation War that followed, more time and effort was dedicated to the growing business. A shed was repurposed as a workshop, and Lauri's sons Risto and Ensio started helping with the manufacturing of the lures. The lures were now properly boxed, and a spinning wheel was fitted with sandpaper in order to bring mechanization into the process. In the 1950s, the lures were gaining in fame – to such an extent that the Rapala family decided to resign from commercial fishing and farm work in order to fully focus on the blossoming business.

=== 1950–1960: International growth ===
In 1955, the first Rapala lures were exported to Sweden, with Norway following in 1956. In what turned out to be a decisive turn for the company, some of Rapala's lures made their way to the United States through the American embassy located in Helsinki, as well as the community of Finnish immigrants in America. These lures caught the attention of Ron Weber, owner of a fishing tackle sales company R. W. Weber Sales. Interested in distributing the lures, Weber and his business partner Raymond Ostrom contacted the Rapala family through the Finnish Trade Council in Chicago, and a business partnership was established – one that continues even today. Initially called The Rapala Company, Weber and Ostrom's company eventually changed its name to Normark. Business picked up rapidly, but the real turn was when an article about Rapala was published in Life magazine. Coincidentally, the article appeared in the issue that covered the death of Marilyn Monroe – the issue that went on to become the highest selling in the history of the magazine. The immense media exposure spiked the demand, leading the company to build their first factory in Vääksy, Finland in 1962. A second factory, situated in Riihilahti, followed in 1963.

=== 1970–2000: Changes and diversification ===
In 1974, after the passing of Lauri Rapala, the company was passed on to his sons Risto, Esko and Ensio, who had all been involved in the company's business for a long time. It was during this time that Rapala was reformed into a limited company, Rapala Oy. In 1982, the company released the lure Shad Rap, which led to an immense rise in demand. The Shad Rap still remains one of the company's best-selling lures. In the beginning of the 1990s, Rapala acquired the distribution company Normark Scandinavia, marking a major expansion for the company. In 1995, the Rapala family sold Rapala's stocks to a new company founded by six members of the Rapala family, the management of the Rapala company, Bankers Trust and its subsidiaries and funds managed by CVC Capital Partners Europe. In 1999, Rapala acquired Storm Manufacturing Company, the plastic-lure manufacturer. This was the company's first major acquisition since the purchase of the Normark companies in the early 1990s. In 2000, the company successfully expanded into different fishing accessory products, including pliers, forceps, clippers, scales, hook removers and hook sharpeners. In November 2000, Rapala was approached by the French hook manufacturer VMC. The negotiation ended in Rapala purchasing VMC. As a result, the parent company's name shifted from Rapala to Rapala VMC OYJ, the name by which it is known today.

=== Present day and future ===
2005 marked a start for an era of strong growth for Rapala, with the company acquiring and establishing distribution companies in South Africa, Australia, Malaysia, China, Thailand and Switzerland. Furthermore, the company acquired the lure manufacturer Luhr Jensen in the USA, knife manufacturer Marttiini in Finland, fishing line supplier Tortue in France and cross-country ski manufacturer Peltonen in Finland. Thereafter, Rapala has established a lure factory and several distribution centers in Russia, a distribution company in Korea and acquired the Terminator spinner bait business in the USA. In 2016, Jorma Kasslin, who had acted as the CEO for the company since 1998, left the position and took position as the president chairman. Kasslin's position was filled by Jussi Ristimäki, the previous executive vice president of the company. In 2020, Nicolas Cederström Warchalowski was appointed as the new President and CEO of Rapala VMC. The company's latest acquisition took place in 2021 when Rapala purchased rights to the Okuma brand in Europe and Russia.

== Sustainability ==
In 2020, Rapala VMC Corporation launched its new sustainability strategy, with the aim of being one of the world's leading fishing tackle companies in terms of sustainability by 2024. By 2023, the company aims to introduce 100% lead-free wobblers, to further reduce the amount of plastic used in lure packaging, to release new plastic-free packaging for multiple product categories and brands, and to shift to renewable energy in all of its lure production units. Rapala has taken the carbon footprint of their lure production as one of their key performance indicators that is assessed on a regular basis. Even before aligning the sustainability strategy, the company has been active in identifying and minimizing its negative impact on the environment. The company's sustainability actions have included minimizing waste resulting from production processes, using sustainable raw materials, and minimizing air transportation. The company's lure manufacturing units in Finland and Estonia shifted to renewable energy in 2020, with Marttiini's factories following in 2021. In 2021, Sufix, a line-manufacturing brand under Rapala, launched the Sufix Recycline Monofilament fishing line, the first fishing line to be made of 100% recycled materials.

== Popular lures ==
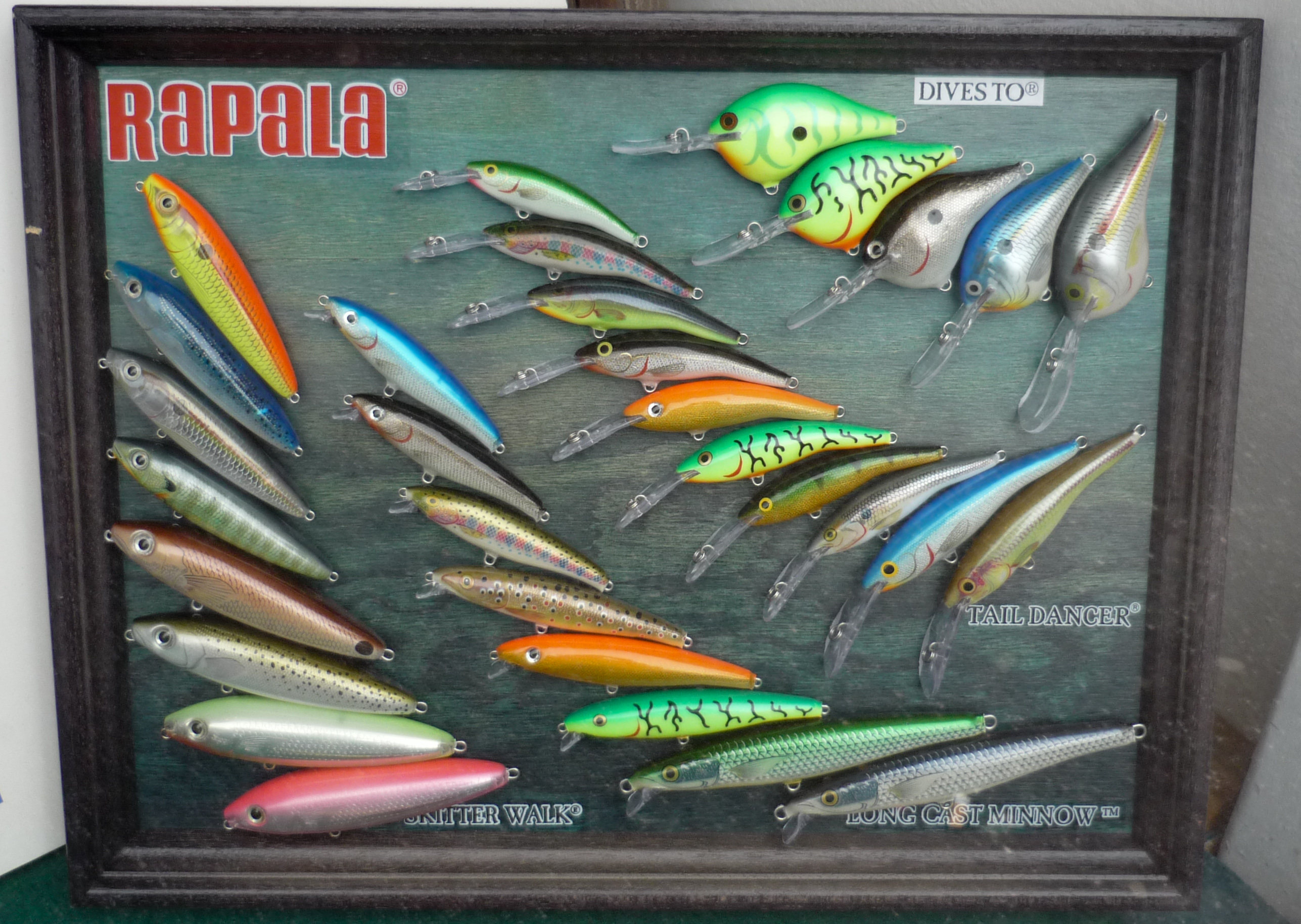
Various lures manufactured by Rapala

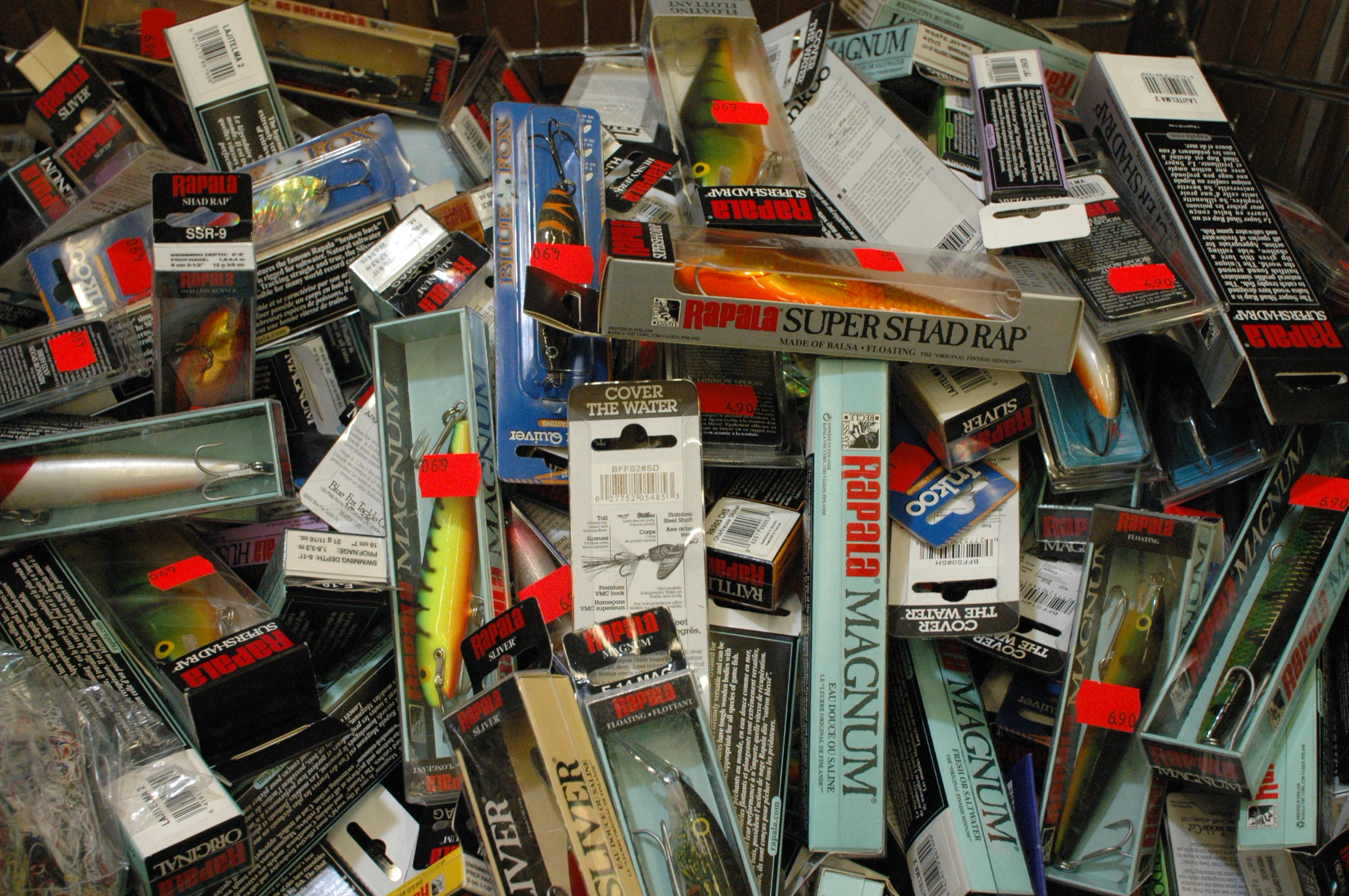
Rapala lures

Some top-running lures (3 feet or shallower) that they make include

- Skitter Pop
- Mickie jackson
- Skitter Walk
- Jigging Shad Rap
- Jigging Rap

Some Medium diving (about 3–10 feet) lures may include

- Original Floater
- Twitchin' Rap
- Long Cast Minnow
- Scatter Rap Minnow
- Scatter Rap Countdown

Some Deep diving Lures (10 feet or deeper) may include

- Magnum
- Down Deep Husky Jerk
- Scatter Rap Crank Deep
- Scatter Rap Crank

== Acquisitions ==
Year	Company	Acquisition
2023	13 Fishing	Acquired remaining share of 13 Fishing rod and reel brand.
2021	Okuma Fishing Tackle Co. Ltd	Acquired Okuma brand and associated property rights in Europe and Russia.
2019	DQC International Corp.	Acquired 49% share of US based company, owner of 13 Fishing rod and reel brand.
2014	Mystic s.a.r.l.	Acquired French fishing attractant manufacturer.
2012	Strike Master Corporation	Acquired the business of US based supplier of ice augers.
2012	Mora Ice	Acquired ice augers and auger cutting blades brand and all related intellectual property rights.
2011	Shimano UK Ltd	Acquired 50% share of UK based distribution company, forming a 50/50 joint venture company with Shimano.
2011	Advance Carp Equipment Ltd	Acquired UK based company engaged in design and sales of equipment and accessories for carp fishing.
2010	Dynamite Baits Ltd	Acquired UK based manufacturer of boilies, groundbaits, liquid attractants, pellets and bagged particle baits for sports fishing.
2009	Ultrabite	Acquired brand and exclusive agreement with Kiotech and CEFAS to commercialized Ultrabite pheromone technology to the sports fishing industry and market worldwide.
2008	Sufix	Acquired fishing line trademark and exclusive supply agreement with Yao I Co Ltd for the supply of fishing lines.
2007	Terminator	Acquired the business of US based manufacturer and distributor of Terminator branded spinner baits and other fishing lures.
2006	Tortue	Acquired the business of French fishing line supplier.
2005	Tatlow and Pledger Pty Ltd	Acquired fishing tackle distributor in South Africa.
2005	Peltonen Ski Oy	Acquired Finnish ski manufacturer.
2005	Marttiini Oy	Acquired Finnish knife manufacturer.
2005	Luhr Jensen	Acquired the business of US based manufacturer of fishing lures and accessories.
2005	Eurohold	Acquired Hungarian fishing tackle distribution and retail business.
2005	Freetime Pty Ltd	Acquired Australian fishing tackle distributor.
2005	Funfish	Acquired Swiss reseller and retailer of fishing tackle products.
2004	Williamson	Acquired lure brand and business in South Africa.
2004	Guigo Marine	Acquired big game fishing business in France.
2002	Fishco AG	Acquired Swiss fishing tackle distributor.
2001	Willtech	Acquired Chinese lure manufacturing unit.
2000	VMC	Acquired French hook factory and hook distribution.
1999	Storm	Acquired the business of US based lure brand.
1999	Elbe Normark AS	Acquired Norwegian fishing tackle distributor.

== Product recalls ==
In January 2021, Rapala recalled 128,000 battery-operated fillet knives manufactured between 2011 and 2018 due to 12 reports of fires caused by charging their batteries with chargers not manufactured by Rapala.

== Literature ==
- Mitchell, J. E.: Rapala: Legendary Fishing Lures. Voyageur Press, 2005. ISBN 9781610604932
