= Pelkosenniemi =

Pelkosenniemi Pelkosnjargâ
- Municipality
- Pelkosenniemen kunta Pelkosenniemi kommun
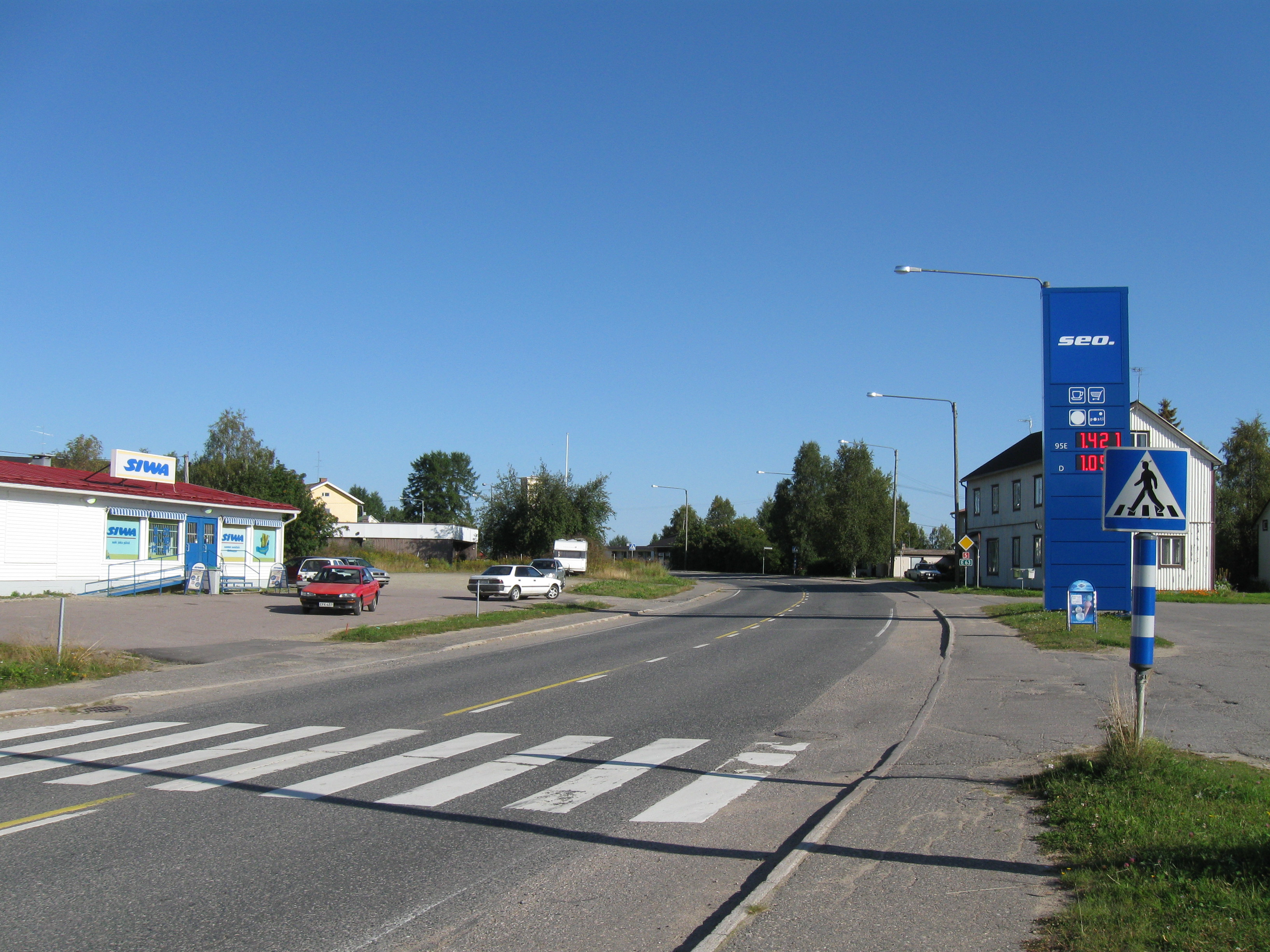

- Coat of arms

- Location of Pelkosenniemi in Finland
- OpenStreetMap Interactive map outlining Pelkosenniemi.
- Interactive map of Pelkosenniemi
- Coordinates: 67°06.5′N 027°31′E
- Country: Finland
- Region: Lapland
- Sub-region: Eastern Lapland
- Charter: 1916

Government
  - Municipal manager: Pertti Severinkangas

Area (2018-01-01)
  - Total: 1,881.58 km^{2} (726.48 sq mi)
  - Land: 1,836.38 km^{2} (709.03 sq mi)
  - Water: 45.4 km^{2} (17.5 sq mi)
  - Rank: 32nd largest in Finland

Population (2025-12-31)
  - Total: 932
  - Rank: 298th largest in Finland
  - Density: 0.51/km^{2} (1.3/sq mi)

Population by native language
  - Finnish: 97.5% (official)
  - Others: 2.5%

Population by age
  - 0 to 14: 9.5%
  - 15 to 64: 53.5%
  - 65 or older: 37.1%
- Time zone: UTC+02:00 (EET)
  - Summer (DST): UTC+03:00 (EEST)
- Website: www.pelkosenniemi.fi

Pelkosenniemi (Inari Sami: Pelkosnjargâ) is a municipality of Finland. It is located in the province of Lapland. The municipality has a population of 932 (31 December 2025), which make it the smallest municipality in Lapland in terms of population. It covers an area of 1,881.58 square kilometres (726.48 sq mi) of which 45.4 km^{2} (17.5 sq mi) is water. The population density is 0.51 inhabitants per square kilometre (1.3/sq mi). Neighbour municipalities are Kemijärvi, Rovaniemi, Salla, Savukoski and Sodankylä.

The municipality is unilingually Finnish and in 2000 was the last remaining municipality in Finland to have its entire population consist of native speakers of Finnish. As of 2010 there were two native speakers of other languages in Pelkosenniemi.

Pelkosenniemi hosts a popular mosquito swatting competition.

== History ==
The area was originally inhabited by Sámi people who spoke the Kemi Sámi language.

The first Finnish settler in the area was Paavali Pelkonen from Lumijoki, who came to the area, then called Kilpimaa, in the 1670s. The area was still property of the Sompio siida. Later it was a part of the Sodankylä parish, under which it acquired its first chapel in 1857. The community was called Alaperä at that time. Pelkosenniemi became a separate parish in 1916, as did Savukoski.

== Notable people ==
- Andy McCoy, formerly Antti Hulkko, lead guitarist of Hanoi Rocks, was born in Pelkosenniemi.

== See also ==
- Kairala, Pelkosenniemi
