= Pertunmaa =

- Former municipality
- Pertunmaan kunta Pertunmaa kommun
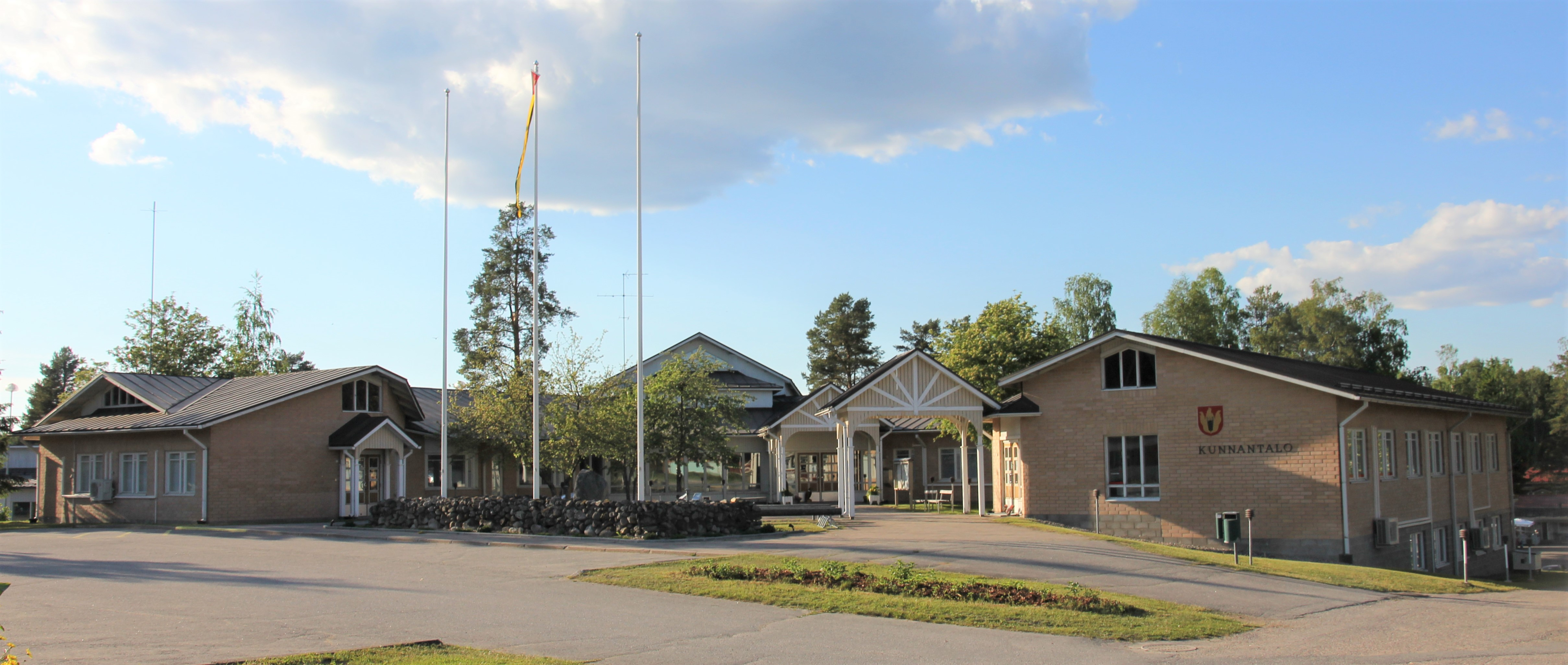
- Pertunmaa town hall

- Coat of arms

- Location of Pertunmaa in Finland
- Coordinates: 61°30′10″N 026°28′45″E
- Country: Finland
- Region: South Savo
- Sub-region: Mikkeli sub-region
- Charter: 1926
- Consolidated: 2025
- Seat: Pertunmaa (Kirkonkylä)

Area
  - Total: 454.20 km^{2} (175.37 sq mi)
  - Land: 374.45 km^{2} (144.58 sq mi)
  - Water: 79.7 km^{2} (30.8 sq mi)

Population (2024-12-31)
  - Total: 1,527
  - Density: 4.12/km^{2} (10.7/sq mi)
- Time zone: UTC+02:00 (EET)
  - Summer (DST): UTC+03:00 (EEST)

Pertunmaa (Finnish: [ˈpertumˌmɑː]) is a former municipality of Finland located in the South Savo region. The municipality was merged to the municipality of Mäntyharju on 1 January 2025.

The municipality had a population of 1,541 and covered an area of 454.20 km2 (175.37 sq mi) of which 79.7 km2 (30.8 sq mi) was water. The population density was 4.12/km2 (10.7/sq mi). The language of the municipality was Finnish.

Neighbour municipalities were Hartola, Heinola, Hirvensalmi, Mäntyharju and Joutsa. Pertunmaa became an independent municipality in 1926 when it was separated from Mäntyharju. Hartola's old wooden church was moved to Pertunmaa and it was inaugurated in 1927.

Due to the long-lasting economic difficulties, Pertunmaa was incorporated into Mäntyharju on 1 January 2025.

== Culture ==
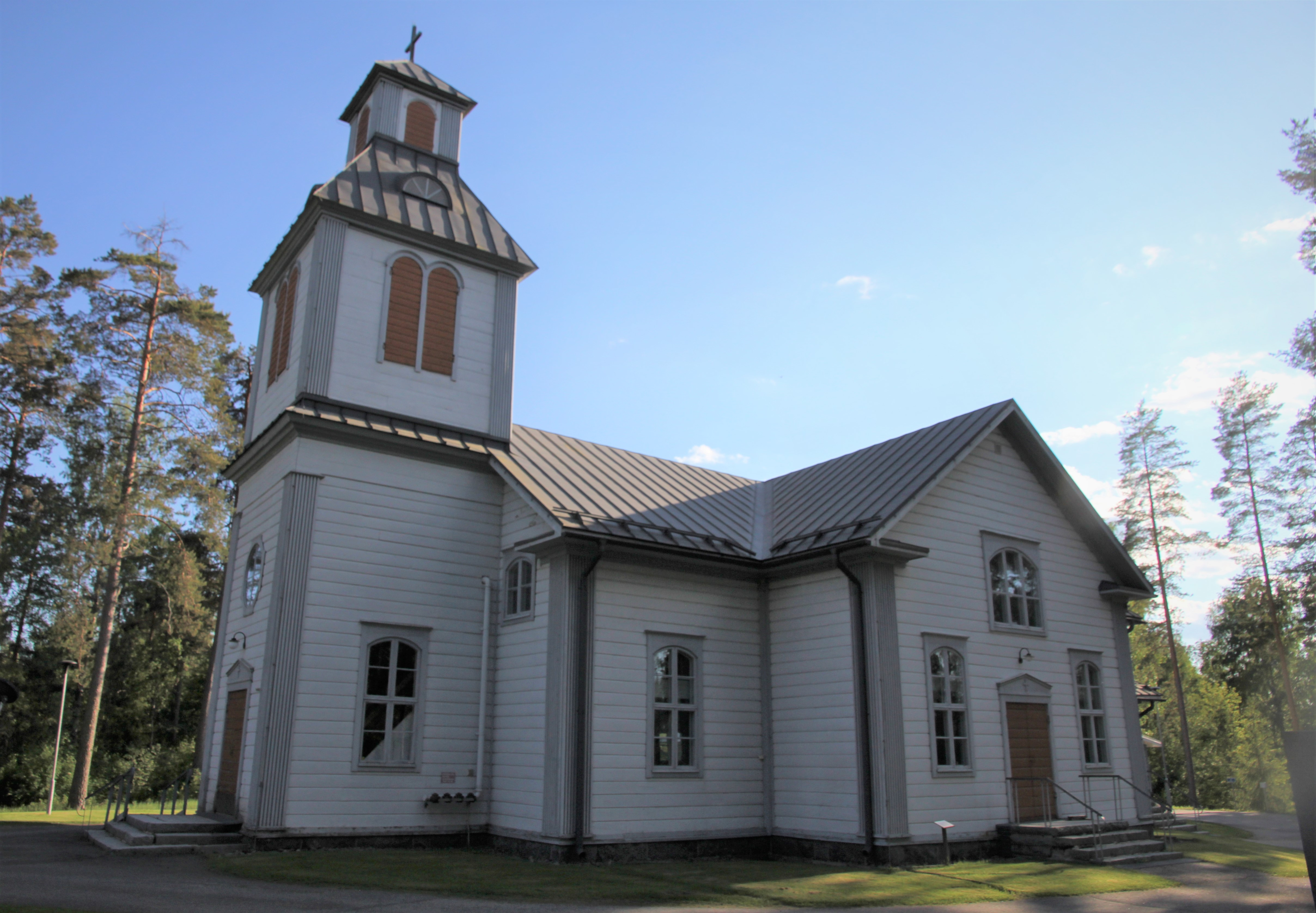
Pertunmaa Church

Geographically, the municipality of Pertunmaa is situated at the junction of two culturally distinct regions: Savo and eastern Häme. Also, Itä-Häme (literally "East Tavastia") newspaper is also distributed in Pertunmaa.

According to a common legend in the locality, Pertunmaa is named after a man called Perttu, who once ruled the whole of Pertunmaa (literally the "land of Perttu") alone. The coat of arms of the municipality, the explanation of which is "a golden flame in a red field with a black ear," has its origins in the slash-and-burn cultivation in ancient times. The coat of arms, designed by Tapio Vallioja, was approved at a meeting of the Pertunmaa Municipal Council on 14 April 1965, and the coat of arms was officially approved for use by the Ministry of the Interior on 1 July of that year.

In the 1980s, blodpalt called Kisko, and Rieska breads baked from rye flour, cream and sour cream, which are baked with cabbage leaves, were named Pertunmaa's traditional dishes.

== Villages ==
Pertunmaa's church village (Pertunmaan kirkonkylä) and Kuortti are the largest and most populous villages of the municipality.

Other smaller villages contain the following.

- Hartosenpää, Hölttä, Joutsjärvi, Karankamäki, Kirkonkylä, Koirakivi, Kuhajärvi, Kälkyttä, Lihavanpää, Mansikkamäki, Nipuli, Ruorasmäki, Ruuttila, Sydänmaa, Vastamäki

== Notable people ==
- Jari Leppä, the Minister of Agriculture and Forestry
- Vesa Törnroos, a sports shooter
- Kari Uotila, a politician
