= III Corps (Finland, Continuation War) =

- III Armeijakunta
- Active: 1941–1944
- Disbanded: Re-designated 1st Division on 5 December 1944
- Country: Finland
- Branch: Army
- Type: Corps
- Engagements: Continuation War; Operation Arctic Fox; Vyborg–Petrozavodsk offensive; Lapland War

Commanders
- Notable commanders: Hjalmar Siilasvuo

The III Corps (Finnish: III Armeijakunta, III AK) was a corps of the Finnish Army during the Continuation War, where Finland fought alongside Nazi Germany against the Soviet Union. Formed from the peacetime V Corps and subordinated to the German Army High Command Norway, III Corps fought initially in northern Finland on the flank of the German XXXVI Corps, participating in the Finno-German Operation Arctic Fox. In February 1944, it was moved to the Karelian Isthmus just prior to the launch of the Soviet Vyborg–Petrozavodsk offensive. Following the Moscow Armistice, III Corps took overall command of the Finnish forces participating in the Lapland War, the removal of German forces from northern Finland.

== Mobilization and pre-war plans ==
While the exact details of the Finno-German planning preceding the Continuation War remain unclear, it is known that on 25 May 1941 Finnish officers participated in negotiations with the Germans in Salzburg regarding plans for a future war with the Soviet Union. According to the plans proposed by the Germans, the Finns would be in charge of operations in the southeast of Finland and east of Lake Ladoga, with overall command of both Finnish and German troops in the area falling under the Finnish commander-in-chief, Marshal Carl Gustaf Emil Mannerheim. In turn, the Finns would subordinate the peacetime V Corps to the headquarters of the German Army of Norway. During follow-up negotiations in Berlin on 26 May, the Finnish general Erik Heinrichs stated that the Army of Norway could expect a Finnish contribution of two divisions, but emphasized that the Finnish forces concentrated in the Salla region would be needed in the south as soon as possible. Forward elements of the German troops began arriving in Finland on 1 June, and further talks followed in Helsinki over the period 3 to 6 June. The participants agreed that the southern border of the Army of Norway's area of operations would be on the line Oulu–Oulujärvi–Lentiira–Belomorsk.

The Finnish mobilization began on 10 June 1941 under the pretext of "additional exercises" (Finnish: ylimääräiset harjoitukset). The Military Districts of Perä-Pohjola and Pohjois-Pohjanmaa called up the 3rd and 6th Divisions, which concentrated in the area between Kajaani and Savukoski under the command of the peacetime V Corps. As arranged in the previous month's discussions, the corps, led by Major General Hjalmar Siilasvuo, was formally subordinated to the headquarters of the German Army of Norway on 15 June. On 18 June, the corps was re-designated as III Corps.

== In Northern Finland, 1941–1944 ==
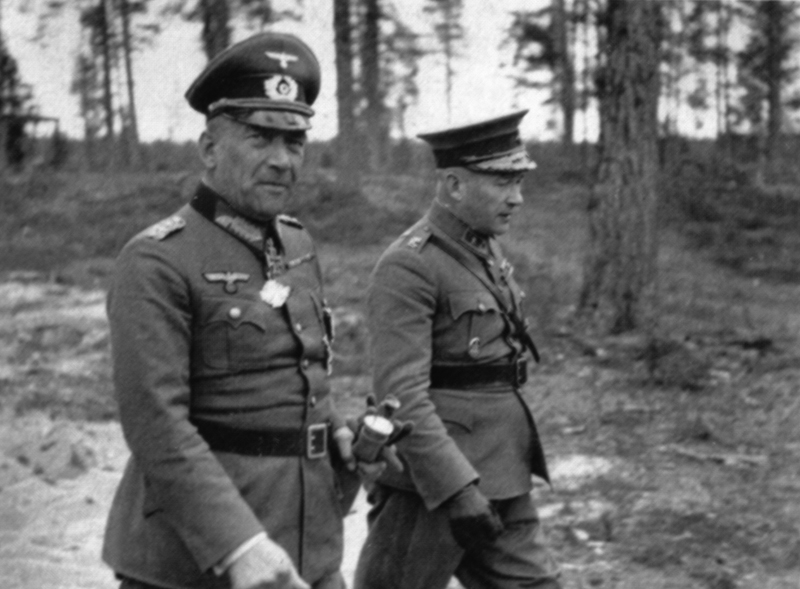
General Nikolaus von Falkenhorst (left) with Major General Hjalmar Siilasvuo (right) at the start of the Continuation War.

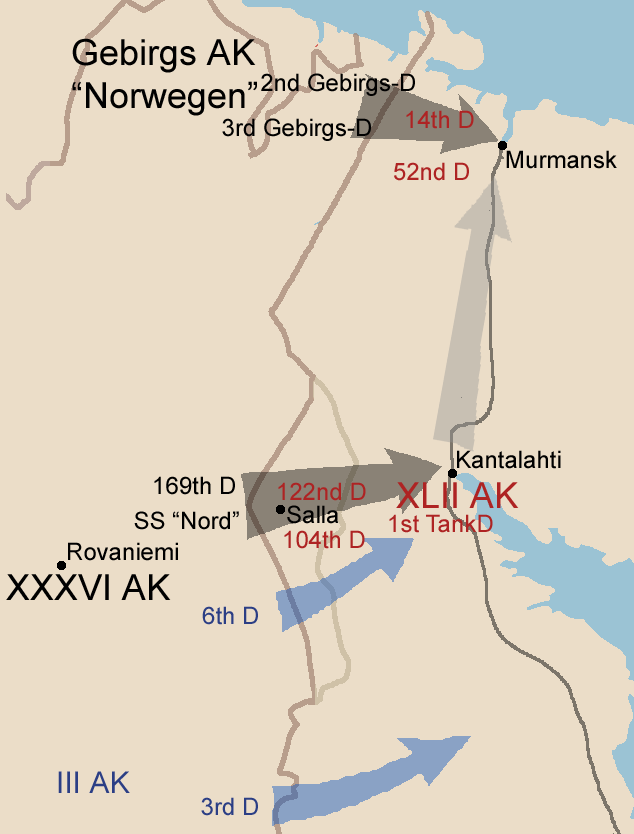
Original plan for Operation Silver Fox

Before the start of the hostilities, the 6th Division was transferred from the III Corps to the German XXXVI Corps. The German plans called for the III Corps, now consisting only of the 3rd Division, to cover the right (southern) flank of the Army of Norway. It was to advance first to the Ukhta–Kestenga line and this movement was to be followed by a continued advance to the Murmansk railroad and Kem. III Corps would be to the south of the German XXXVI Corps, with the unit areas of responsibility defined by the line Kuusamo–Oulanka–Chupa. III Corps thus secured the southern flank of Operation Silver Fox, targeting the capture of Murmansk. Siilasvuo divided the remaining forces of the III Corps into two formations. Group F, consisting of the main body of the 3rd Division, attacked east from Suomussalmi; its initial objective was Voknavolok, from where it was expected to continue towards Ukhta. Group J, formed around one regiment from the 3rd Division, attacked towards Sohjana, with a follow-on objective of Kestenga. III Corps was ordered to launch its attack on 1 July, at 02:30.

It soon become apparent that III Corps was the only corps-level unit of the Army of Norway making significant progress, and the corps was reinforced with parts of SS Division Nord on 21 July. On 30 July, Adolf Hitler approved a modification to the Germans plans: operations of the two German corps of the Army of Norway were largely halted, and German reinforcements were allocated to support the attack of the III Corps. The main objective of the III Corps was to be the Murmansk railroad in the area of Loukhi. By end of July, SS Division Nord had been subordinated to III Corps in totality. As Siilasvuo did not trust the German officers to lead Finnish forces following their failures in the Salla region, the bulk of the combat strength of SS Division Nord was subordinated to Group J, the Finnish force consisting of a single regiment while the staff of the Division was subordinated into the III Corps HQ. This resulted in tension between the various commanders, as the officers of SS Division Nord viewed the subordination as a humiliation.

By 2 August, Group F had reached the Soviet defensive lines north of Ukhta, but failed to take the town due to strong resistance by the Soviet 54th Division. Renewed attempts in September fared no better. Group J had taken up positions 8 miles (13 km) east of Kestenga after being pushed back by the Soviet 88th Division which had recently arrived in the area. General Siilasvuo reported to Generaloberst Nikolaus von Falkenhorst that III Corps was unable to reach Loukhi, with both sides settling for stationary warfare in the sector. On 14 August, Group J was renamed Division J and Group F as 3rd Division. On the same date, Hitler ordered the attack on Ukhta to be halted, and for Division J, including SS-Division Nord, to go on the defensive. Concurrently with these changes, SS Division Nord was de-subordinated from Division J and was given its own sector alongside Division J's as part of the III Corps's northern group.

By 6 October the situation at the front had improved to a point where von Falkenhorst and Siilasvuo discussed continuing the III Corps's advance towards Loukhi. Due to Hitler's August order, the plan was phrased as III Corp improving its positions. To this end, on 16 October, von Falkenhorst approved a plan to capture "a crossing of a railway and a highway 30 kilometres (19 mi) east of Kestenga", indicating the real purpose of the operation was to cut the Murmansk railroad. The Finnish high command was informed about the operation on 25 October, but nobody informed the German high command, Oberkommando der Wehrmacht (OKW). The operation began on 30 October, with III Corps encircling a Soviet regiment in the first two days. On 9 October, the Army of Norway reported to OKW that two regiments of the Soviet 88th Rifle Division had been virtually destroyed, but Finnish intelligence indicated that Soviets were reinforcing the area with the 186th Rifle Division from Murmansk.

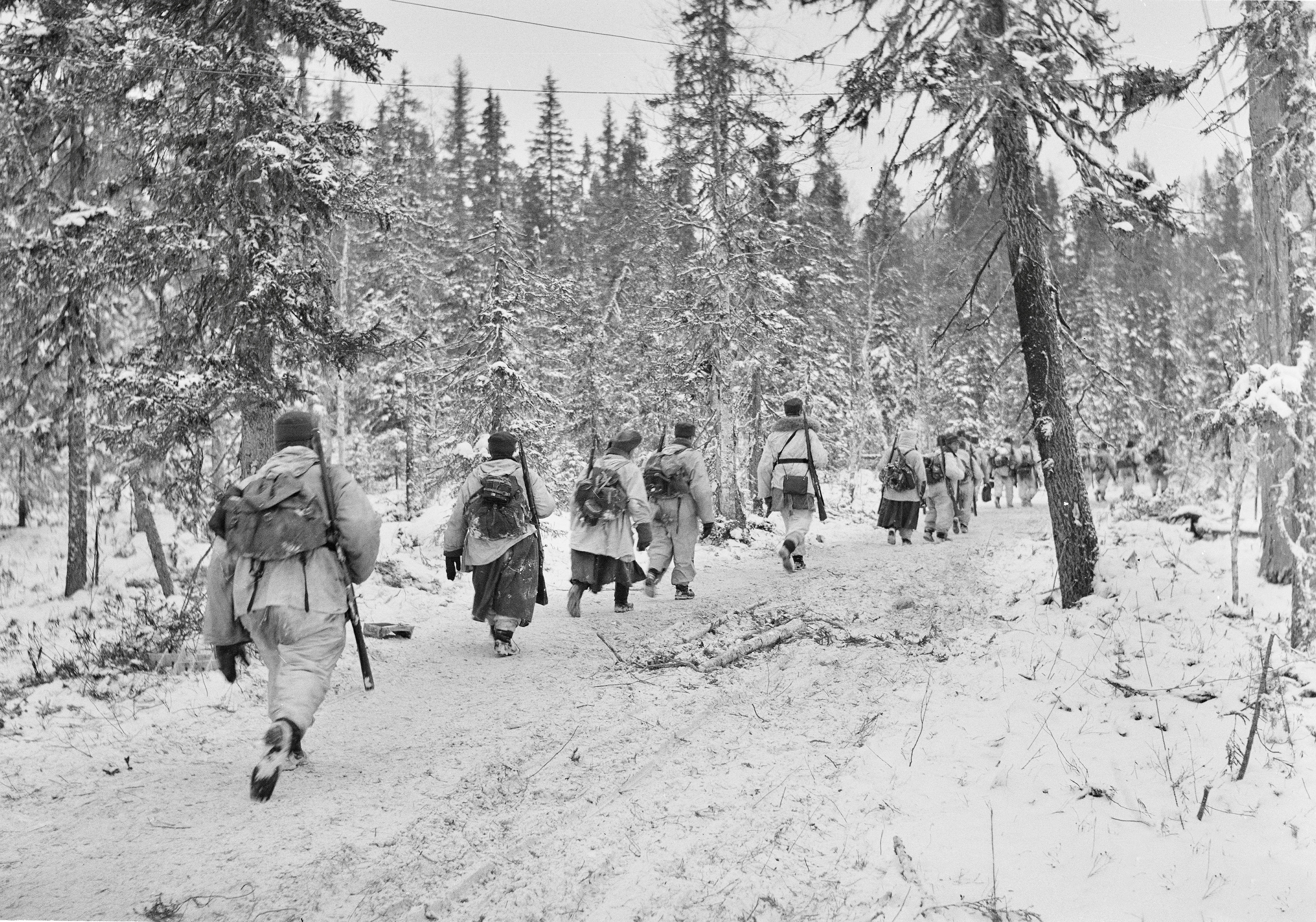
Finnish soldiers east of Kestenga in the arctic forest.

On 5 November, Siilasvuo was informed by the Finnish high command that the attack should be halted for political reasons, and that no additional Finnish reinforcements would be forthcoming despite Siilasvuo's wishes. The United States of America had given the Finnish government a note demanding the attack be stopped. This had caused Finnish President Risto Ryti to express his concern over the operation to Mannerheim. By 11 November, Siilasvuo was actively slowing down the attack by ordering construction of further field fortifications. On the same date, the headquarters of the German Army of Norway received a message from OKW, demanding an explanation for the III Corps's attack. The message also reiterated a previous order for the whole Army of Norway sector to go to a defensive posture. On 17 November, Siilasvuo gave a written order to halt the attack. By December, the fighting in the area had calmed down.

In early 1942, the German forces in northern Finland and Norway were reorganized with the creation of the German Lapland Army (soon renamed the 20th Mountain Army) which took over Army of Norway's responsibilities in northern Finland. As part of this reorganization, III Corps was transferred to the Lapland Army. On 4 July, III Corps was formally transferred back to Finnish command, where it was directly subordinated to the Finnish commander-in-chief Mannerheim, with the German XVIII Corps taking responsibility for the Kestenga area the previous day. The area of Ukhta remained a Finnish responsibility until 22 March 1944, when it was handed to the 20th Mountain Army.

== Karelian Isthmus, 1944 ==
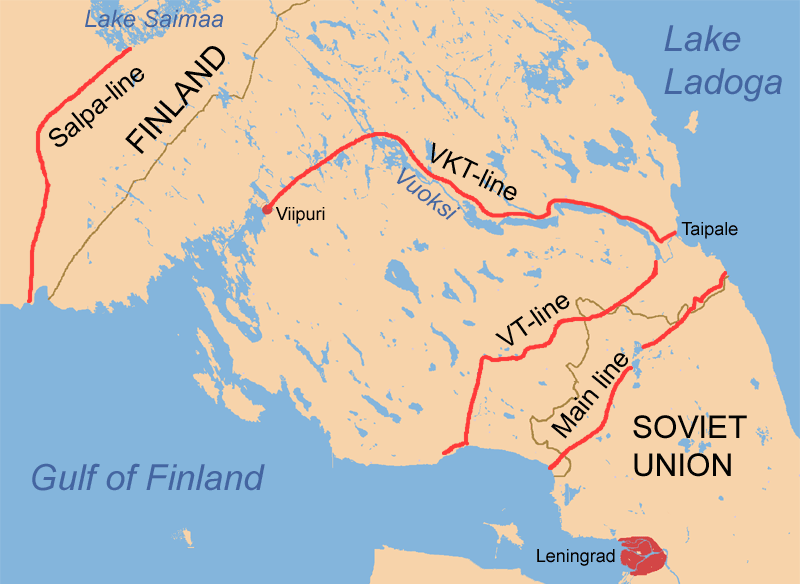
Finnish defensive lines on the Karelian Isthmus

In March 1942, Finnish defenses had been reorganized under three large formations named Kannas Group, Maaselkä Group and Aunus Group. After the end of the siege of Leningrad in January 1944, the Finnish high command prepared for a Soviet offensive. As part of these preparations, the Kannas Group, responsible for the Karelian Isthmus (Finnish: Karjalankannas), was split into two corps-level formations on 4 March. The western side of the isthmus became the responsibility of the IV Corps, with the eastern side of the isthmus being handed to the III Corps, the headquarters of which was moved to the area from northern Finland. Following this reorganization, on 6 July, III Corps consisted of the 15th Division, the 19th Brigade and some assets from the 18th Division that mostly acted as part of the commander-in-chief's reserve. The 3rd Division, previously part of the III Corps and recently freed from its frontal duties in the Ukhta area, was subordinated directly to the commander-in-chief as reserve.

On 9 June 1944, the Soviet Vyborg–Petrozavodsk offensive started with a preparatory attack against the sector of the IV Corps. The main thrust of the offensive, on the Karelian Isthmus, hit the IV Corps sector on 10 June and quickly breached the Finnish main defensive line. By 11 June, IV Corps had been pushed sufficiently far back that the flank of III Corps was endangered. Even after IV Corps had reached the secondary VT-line on 12 June, III Corps was still holding to its part of the original main defensive line. On 13 June, to protect the flank of the corps, the 18th Division was released from the reserve and subordinated to III Corps. Concurrently, preparations were started for a future retreat to the VT-line. By 14 June, the situation of the 15th Division was becoming increasingly untenable, and III Corps was given permission to retreat to the VT-line. The retreat began on the night of 14–15 June, and the bulk of III Corps had reached the secondary defensive line by the end of June 15, with the exception of some forces on the left-most flank on the shore of Lake Ladoga.

The situation on the western Karelian Isthmus continued to deteriorate, and on 16 June Mannerheim ordered the 18th Division to be moved to the Vyborg region to act as his reserve as soon as possible. Given the rapid Soviet advance to the west, the III Corps continued to be in danger of being cut off. In the following days, the corps conducted a series of delaying actions, eventually taking defensive positions along Vuoksi, on the VKT-line. By 20 June, III Corps had created a defensive line consisting of two divisions and a brigade. The front stabilized along the Vuoksi for the rest of the war, and Soviet forces failed to break the VKT-line on the III Corps sector despite several attempts.

== After the Continuation War ==
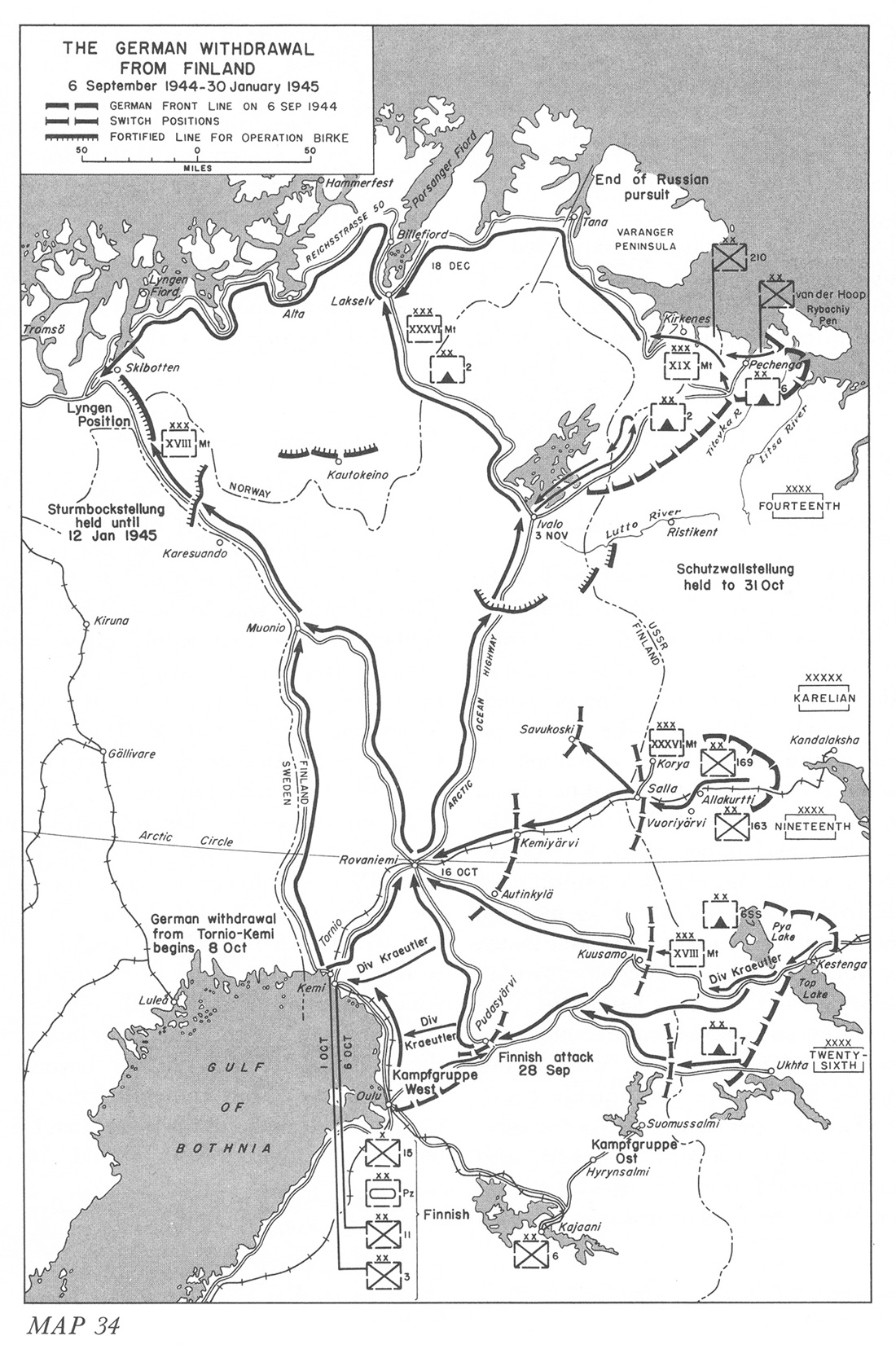
The German withdrawal from Finland

A ceasefire was agreed in September 1944 between the Soviet Union and Finland, which led to the Moscow Armistice. One of the terms of the armistice required Finland to ensure the removal of any German forces remaining in Finland. In practice, this meant that unless the German 20th Mountain Army Corps voluntarily retreated from Finland by mid-September, Finnish forces would have to evict them by force. Initially, Germans fell back towards Norway in unofficial cooperation with the Finnish forces. However, following the failure of Operation Tanne Ost, where the German's attempted capture Gogland from Finnish defenders on 14–15 September, as well as a general cessation of any voluntary movement towards Norway, Finno-German cooperation completely broke down.

During the resulting Lapland War, III Corps was moved to northern Finland where it took overall command of all the Finnish forces participating in the fighting against the Germans. The resulting formation consisted of the 3rd, 6th, 11th, 15th divisions, the Armored Division and two brigades. Over the next months, the III Corps slowly pushed the Germans out of Lapland.

As the Finnish Army completed its demobilization by early December, as mandated by the Moscow Armistice, the forces under III Corps were reduced from a peak strength of 75,000 to approximately 12,000 men. On 5 December the corps was re-designated 1st Division, which remained under Siilasvuo's command. As the veterans of the Continuation War were demobilized and replaced by fresh conscripts, this latter part of the Lapland War became known in Finland as the "Children's Crusade". The final stages of the war saw the Germans only occupy a minor area of land in the Karesuvanto region, and the Finnish forces in the area were eventually reduced to a task force consisting of 700 men. The final German forces left Finland on 27 April 1945, signaling the end to the Lapland War.

== See also ==
- Finnish III Corps (Winter War)
- List of Finnish corps in the Continuation War
