= 6th Division (Finland, Continuation War) =

- 6. Divisioona
- Active: 1941–1944
- Country: Finland
- Branch: Army
- Type: Division

Commanders
- Notable commanders: Einar Vihma

The 6th Division (Finnish: 6. Divisioona) was a unit of the Finnish Army during the Continuation War. Subordinated to the German XXXVI Corps, the division took part in the German-led Operation Arctic Fox in 1941. In 1943, the division was moved to Eastern Karelia, from where it was moved to the Karelian Isthmus following the start of the 1944 Soviet Vyborg–Petrozavodsk offensive. Following the Moscow armistice, the division also took part in the Lapland War against the German forces remaining in Finnish Lapland.

== History ==
Originally a part of the Finnish V Corps, the 6th Division was attached to the German XXXVI Corps in Northern Finland in 1941. As part of Operation Arctic Fox, the division attacked alongside the SS Division Nord and German 169th Infantry Division against Salla with the goal of reaching Kandalaksha on the White Sea coast. The town of Salla was captured, but the division suffered 405 casualties in the process. Following the capture of Salla, the division continued towards river Verman, reaching it on October 18, 1941. By this point, both increasingly difficult logistics and the losses suffered forced Operation Arctic Fox to be halted. The 6th division was considered unfit for attack. During these actions, the division also fought alongside a small German tank unit, the Panzer-Abteilung 211, which consisted of captured French tanks.

Following the failure of Operation Arctic Fox, the Finnish general headquarters wanted to reduce the division to a brigade-sized element to help both a labor shortage on the home front, as well as for foreign political reasons related to attacking beyond the pre-Winter War borders. The division was reorganized as the 12th Brigade in early 1942. In January 1943, the brigade was re-expanded to divisional size, again taking the name 6th Division, and assigned to the Aunus Group. In July 1943, it was reassigned to the isthmus north of Lake Onega as part of the Maaselkä Group.

After the Soviet Vyborg–Petrozavodsk offensive started in 1944, the 6th Division was moved to the Karelian Isthmus as a component of the Finnish IV Corps. There it took part in the decisive Battle of Tali-Ihantala, where its arrival prevented the breaking of the Armored Division and enabled the Armored Division and the 11th Division to be moved out of the line to act as a reserve.

After the Moscow armistice, the division also took part in the Lapland War against the German forces still in Lapland. On September 30, 1944, the division was subordinated to the Armored Division, with the resulting formation being named Group Lagus. As a part of this formation, the division participated in the capture of Rovaniemi, after which it was disbanded.

== Commanders ==
- Colonel Werner Viikla (1941)
- Major General Einar Vihma (1943–1944)
- Colonel A. Puromaa (1944)

== Organization ==
The 6th Division was organised from men from the Far-North Military Province (Perä-Pohjolan Sotilaslääni). It lacked the Heavy Artillery Battalion.

The division consisted of the following subordinate units:

- Infantry Regiment 12 (Rovaniemi)
- Infantry Regiment 33 (Sodankylä)
- Infantry Regiment 54 (Western Lapland)
- Field Artillery Regiment 14 (Tornio)
- Light Battalion 3
- Engineer Battalion 36
- Signal Battalion 36

== See also ==
- List of Finnish divisions in the Continuation War
- Finnish 6th Division (Winter War)
