= Verman =

Verman may refer to:

- Ajit Verman (1947–2016), Indian composer
- R. Verman, Indian art director
- Verman (river), river in Murmansk Oblast, Russia
- Verman (no last name), a character in the Penrod stories written by Booth Tarkington
