= Hans Feige =

German general (1880–1953)

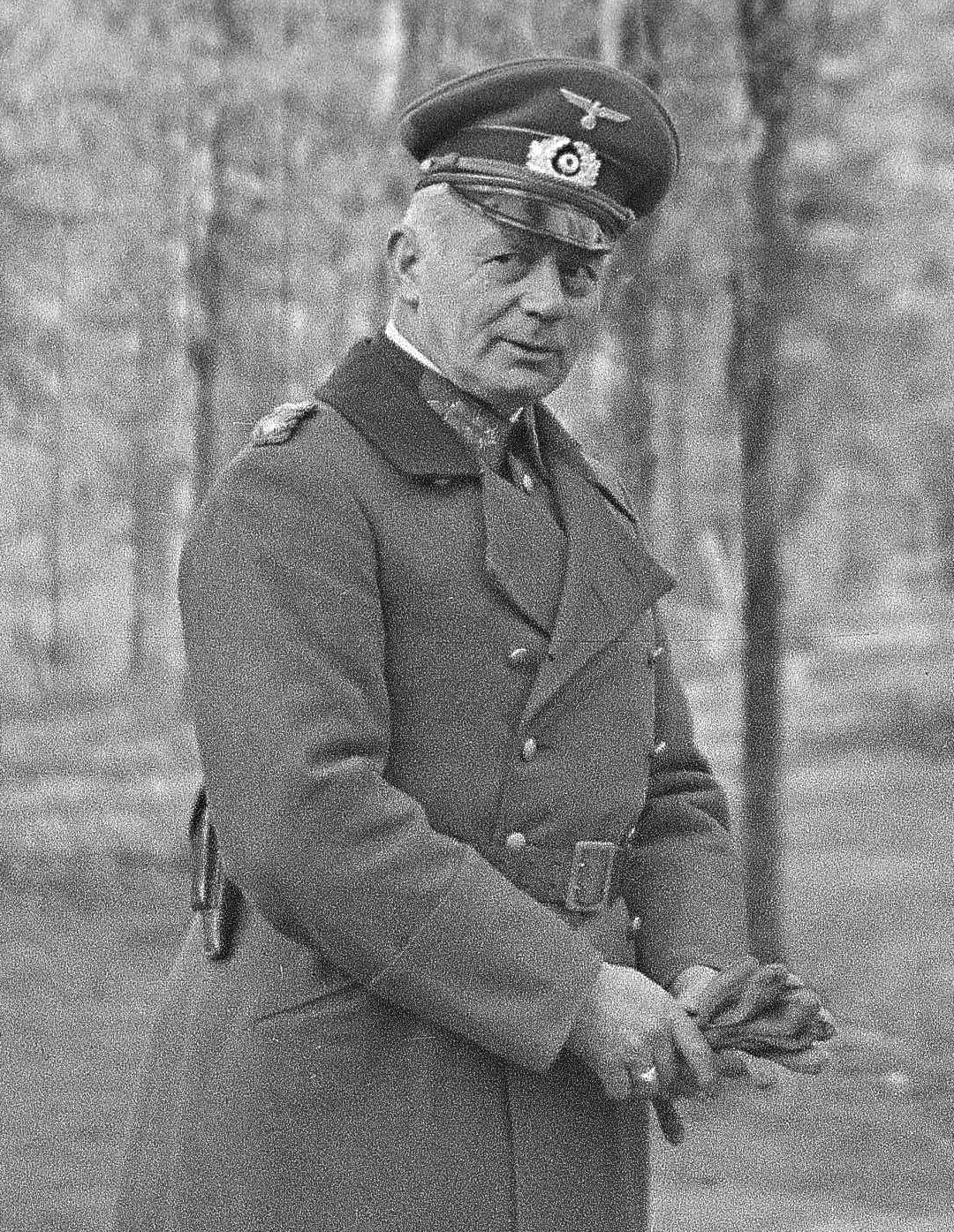
- Hans Feige, Finland 1941.
- Born: 10 November 1880; Königsberg, East Prussia, German Empire
- Died: 17 September 1953 (aged 72); Bad Schussenried, Baden-Württemberg, West Germany
- Military career
- Allegiance: German Empire; Weimar Republic; Nazi Germany
- Branch: Imperial German Army; Reichswehr; German Army
- Service years: 1900–1935; 1939–1942
- Rank: General der Infanterie
- Commands: 1st Cavalry Division; XXXVI. Gebirgs-Armeekorps
- Conflicts: World War I; World War II; Battle of France; Operation Arctic Fox
- Awards: Clasp to the Iron Cross 1st and 2nd class German Cross in gold

Hans Feige (10 November 1880 – 17 September 1953) was a German career military officer who served in the Imperial German Army, the Reichswehr and the Wehrmacht. He participated in both world wars and rose to the rank of General of the Infantry during World War II. He served as a corps commander in the Battle of France and in Finland during the invasion of the Soviet Union. After the failure of Operation Arctic Fox, he was removed from command in November 1941.

== World War I and Reichswehr service ==
Feige was born in 1880 at Königsberg (today, Kaliningrad) and joined the Prussian Army in 1900. During World War I he served mainly in general staff positions of various formations. He was wounded twice and was highly decorated, being awarded both classes of the Iron Cross, the Hanseatic Cross of Lübeck, the Wound Badge in black and several other orders and awards. At the end of the war, he was a Major serving on the staff of the Guards Replacement Division. Feige joined the Freikorps and was accepted into the post-war Reichswehr. Again, he mostly served in staff positions and was promoted to Generalmajor on 1 October 1931 and to Generalleutnant two years later. On 1 October 1933, he took command of the 1st Cavalry Division, which was disbanded in 1935. He retired from military service in March 1935, as a brevet General of the Cavalry.

== World War II ==
Just before the onset of World War II, Feige was recalled to active service in August 1939 and placed in command of the Replacement II Army Corps in Wehrkreis II, headquartered in Stettin (today, Szczecin). He took command of the XXXVI Corps in May 1940. His unit subsequently participated in the Fall of France in the Lorraine region. The corps was then transferred to Norway. In December 1940, Feige was promoted to General der Infanterie.

In preparation for Operation Barbarossa, Feige's corps moved into central Finland. When the German offensive was launched on 22 June 1941, his unit – together with the Finnish III Corps – was tasked with recapturing Salla and cutting off Murmansk from the rest of Russia by advancing eastwards during Operation Arctic Fox. Although Salla was recaptured, the advance of his ill-equipped forces soon stalled. Feige was pressured by Nikolaus von Falkenhorst, commander of Army Norway, to continue the offensive. It met with few results, and was finally called off on 17 September 1941. In November, Feige was withdrawn from his corps command and replaced by Karl Weisenberger. He subsequently was placed into the Führerreserve and never again took over an active command. As a result of this inactivity, he finally retired on 30 June 1942.

== Awards and decorations ==
- Iron Cross of 1914, 1st and 2nd class
- Knight's Cross with swords of the House Order of Hohenzollern
- Military Merit Order of Bavaria, 4th class with swords
- Knight's Cross 1st class with swords of the Albert Order
- Friedrich-August-Kreuz 1st and 2nd class
- Hanseatic Cross of Lübeck
- Military Merit Cross of Austria-Hungary, 3rd class with war decoration
- Gallipoli Star
- Commander's Cross of the Order of Military Merit of Bulgaria
- Honour Cross of the World War 1914/1918
- Clasp to the Iron Cross, 1st and 2nd class
- German Cross in gold (19 December 1941)
- Grand Cross of the Order of the White Rose of Finland with breast star and swords

== Sources ==
- Mann, Chris M.; Jörgensen, Christer (2002). Hitler's Arctic War. Hersham, UK: Ian Allan Publishing. ISBN 0-7110-2899-0.
- Matikkala, Antti (2017). Kunnian ruletti: Korkeimmat ulkomaalaisille 1941-1944 annetut suomalaiset kunniamerkit (in Finnish). Helsinki: Suomalaisen Kirjallisuuden Seura. ISBN 978-952-222-847-5.
- Nenye, Vesa; Munter, Peter; Wirtanen, Tony; Birks, Chris (2016). Finland at War: The Continuation and Lapland Wars 1941–45. Osprey Publishing. ISBN 978-1-4728-1526-2.
- Webb, James Jack (2024). Generals and Admirals of the Third Reich: For Country or Fuehrer. Vol. 1: A–G. Havertown, PA: Casemate Publishers. ISBN 978-1-952-71512-9.
- Ziemke, Earl F. (1959). The German Northern Theater of Operations 1940–1945 (PDF). United States Government Printing. ISBN 0-16-001996-6. Archived from the original (PDF) on 21 October 2020.

Military offices
Preceded by -	Commander of XXXVI. Gebirgs-Armeekorps; May 1940 – 30 November 1941	Succeeded by General der Infanterie Karl Weisenberger
