= 3rd Division (Finland) =

- 3. Divisioona
- Active: 1941–1944
- Country: Finland
- Branch: Army
- Type: Division
- Engagements: Continuation War; Operation Arctic Fox; Vyborg–Petrozavodsk offensive; Lapland War; Battle of Tornio

The 3rd Division (Finnish: 3. Divisioona) was a unit of the Finnish Army during the Continuation War. It initially fought in the northern Finland, participating in the Finno-German Operation Arctic Fox. In 1944, it was transferred to the Karelian Isthmus to defend against the Soviet Vyborg–Petrozavodsk offensive. Following the Moscow Armistice in 1944, the division was moved to Oulu and participated in the Lapland War.

== History ==
The 3rd Division was the main component of the Finnish III Corps. During the war, the division fought mostly in the Ukhta and Kestenga area, where it participated in Operation Arctic Fox, the Finno-German drive towards the Murmansk railway. During this operation, the division was split into two groups, Group J (Finnish: Ryhmä J) and Group F (Finnish: Ryhmä F). Observing the speed of advance of the III Corps, the Germans reinforced Group J with a regiment-sized element of SS-troops. The division's advance was eventually halted after the Soviet 88th Rifle Division entered the area.

In 1944 the division was transferred to the Karelian Isthmus, where it participated in the Finnish defense against the Soviet Vyborg–Petrozavodsk offensive. During this time, the division was temporarily reinforced with the 6th Separate Battalion (Finnish: Erillispataljoona 6). Formed originally by the Germans as 664th Eastern Battalion, the battalion consisted of volunteering, non-prisoner-of-war, Ingrian Finns.

Following the Moscow Armistice in 1944, the division was moved to Oulu. As part of the Lapland War against Germany, the division's Infantry Regiment 11 conducted a landing in Tornio in the morning of October 1st, 1944. Following a successful landing, the regiment was reinforced the next day by Infantry Regiment 53, also from the 3rd Division. From Tornio, the division advanced to Rovaniemi and onward to Muonio where it was disbanded.

== See also ==
- List of Finnish divisions in the Continuation War
- Finnish 3rd Division (Winter War)
