= 1st Cavalry Division (Reichswehr) =

- 1. Kavallerie-Division
- Active: 1921–1934
- Disbanded: October 1934
- Country: Weimar Republic
- Branch: Reichsheer
- Type: Cavalry
- Size: Division
- Part of: Gruppenkommando 1
- Garrison/HQ: Frankfurt an der Oder

Commanders
- Notable commanders: Ludwig Beck; Werner von Fritsch; Fedor von Bock

The 1st Cavalry Division was a unit of the Reichswehr, the armed forces of Germany during the Weimar Republic.

It consisted of 6 cavalry regiments, the 1st, 2nd, 3rd, 4th, 5th, and 6th (Prussian) Regiments. It was subordinated to Gruppenkommando 1.

== Divisional commanders ==
- General der Kavallerie Rudolf von Horn (1 June 1920 - 1 June 1921)
- Generalleutnant Otto Freiherr von Tettau (1 June 1920 - 1 April 1923)
- General der Kavallerie Walther von Jagow (1 April 1923 - 1 February 1927)
- Generalleutnant Ulrich von Henning auf Schönhoff (1 February 1927 - 1 February 1929)
- Generalleutnant Georg Brandt (1 February 1929 - 1 December 1929)
- Generalleutnant Fedor von Bock (1 December 1929 - 1 October 1931)
- Generalleutnant Werner von Fritsch (1 October 1931 - 1 October 1932)
- Generalleutnant Ludwig Beck (1 October 1932 - 1 October 1933)
- Generalleutnant Hans Feige (1 October 1933 - 1 April 1935)

== Garrison ==
The divisional headquarters was in Frankfurt an der Oder.
