= Panzer-Abteilung 40 =

Panzer Abteilung 40
- Active: 8 March 1940 – 10 June 1943
- Disbanded: 10 June 1943
- Country: Nazi Germany
- Branch: Heer
- Type: Tank battalion
- Equipment: Panzer I, Panzer II, Panzer III and Neubaufahrzeug
- Engagements: Operation Weserübung, Operation Arctic Fox

Panzer-Abteilung 40 was the name of a tank battalion of the German army during World War II. The battalion fought during the invasion of Norway (Operation Weserübung) and afterwards during Operation Silver Fox, the German-Finnish offensive to capture the Soviet port of Murmansk. The unit remained in Finland until it was sent to Oslo and disbanded.

== Operation Weserübung ==
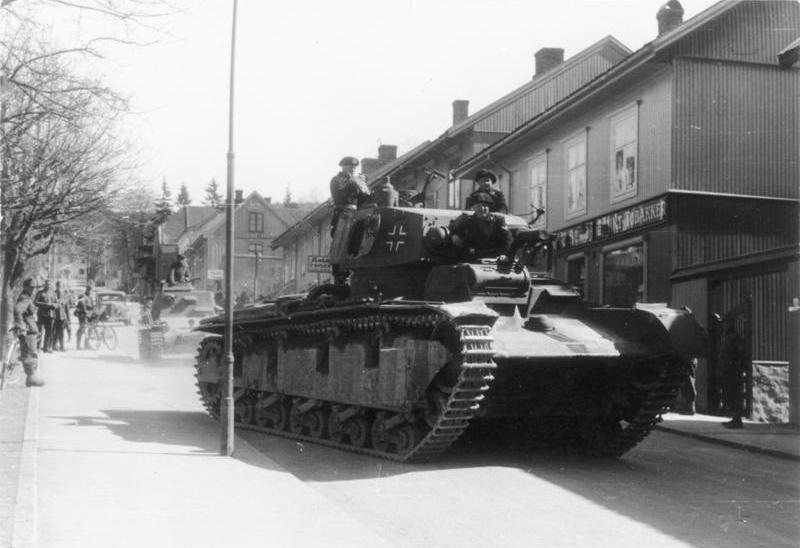
Neubaufahrzeug tanks in Norway, 1940

Panzer-Abteilung zur besonderen Verwendung 40 (Panzer-Abteilung z.b.V. 40), translating as "panzer unit for special purpose utilization", was formed on March 8, 1940 for the German invasion of Norway and of Denmark. The unit consisted mostly of Panzer I and Panzer II light tanks. It took part in the invasion of Denmark on 9 April and then was transported to Norway in April 1940.

The unit consisted of an HQ section and three companies, one taken from 3rd, 4th and 5th Panzer Divisions, each with three platoons as the fourth platoon remained with the original division in each case. On April 9, 1940 the unit complement included 69 tanks (42 Panzer I, 21 Panzer II and 6 Panzer I Befehlswagen command tanks.) Most of Panzer I tanks were Ausf A while the Panzer II tanks were primarily the Ausf c variant.

With the invasions on April 9, 1940, the First and Second companies were sent to Denmark while the Third company was sent to Norway aboard the transport ships Urundi and Antaris H. On April 10, 1940 Antaris H was sunk by the Royal Navy submarine HMS Sunfish with the loss of 15 tanks and crew. Only two tanks, a Panzer I and II, arrived in Norway. German forces in Norway were reinforced by the First and Second companies, who embarked on 20 April and arrived on 24 April.

For propaganda purposes a special tank platoon consisting of three Neubaufahrzeug tanks was assigned to Panzer-Abteilung 40, hoping to convince the Allies that the Germans possessed heavy tanks. On 19 April the Neubaufahrzeug tanks were paraded through Oslo before being assigned to the front. They engaged in combat in southern Norway. One Neubaufahrzeug was immobilized after being hit and was demolished by engineers. After the Norwegian Campaign, the unit, without the Neubaufahrzeug tanks, was reorganized and moved to Finland.

== Operation Silver Fox ==
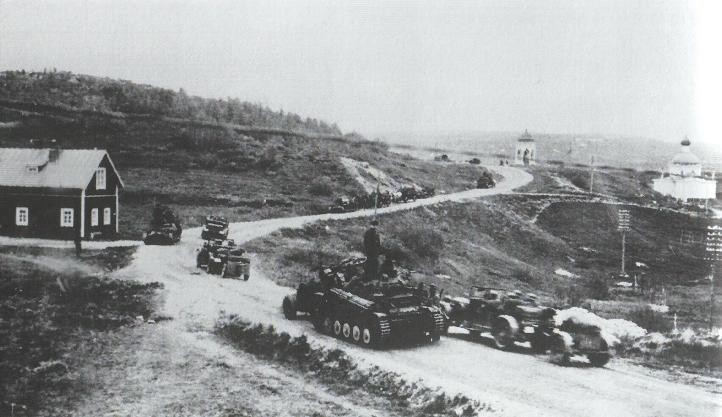
Panzer-Abteilung 40 during the advance on Murmansk, 1941

Murmansk's port was an objective for the Germans in 1941. Panzer-Abteilung 40 together with Panzer-Abteilung 211 was attached to XXXVI Mountain Corps which conducted Operation Arctic Fox (a part of Operation Silver Fox), meant to recapture the Salla region from the Soviets and then proceed eastwards and cut the Murmansk railway at Kandalaksha. The offensive was launched on 1 July 1941. The German-Finnish force recaptured the Salla region, but was halted by attritional battles around Kestenga, where the operation became a stalemate. The unit remained in the area during 1942, later pulled back to Norway. It was disbanded on 10 June 1943.

== Sources ==
- Mann, Chris M.; Jörgensen, Christer. Hitlers Arctic War. Hersham, UK: Ian Allan Publishing Ltd. ISBN 0-7110-2899-0.
- Haarr, Geirr H. (2010). The Battle for Norway – April–June 1940. Barnsley: Seaforth Publishing. ISBN 978-1-84832-057-4.
- McCarthy, Peter; Syron, Mike (2002). Panzerkrieg: The Rise and Fall of Hitler's Tank Divisions. London UK: Constable & Robinson Ltd. ISBN 1-84119-800-5.
