= Panzer-Abteilung 211 =

- Active: 1 July 1941 - 8 May 1945
- Country: Nazi Germany
- Branch: Heer
- Type: Panzer
- Size: battalion
- Equipment: 90 Somua S35, 82 Hotchkiss H38 total
- Engagements: Operation Silver Fox

Panzer-Abteilung 211 was a tank battalion of the German army during World War II. The battalion fought during Operation Silver Fox which was a combined German and Finnish offensive attempting to capture the Soviet port of Murmansk. The unit was disbanded after this operation due to their outdated equipment.

== Formation ==
After the fall of France in June 1940 the Germans captured a large amount of French vehicles. Among those were 297 (varying according to sources) Somua S35 which was considered by many to be the premier medium tank at the beginning of the war. In addition to the Somua S35s there were around 550 Hotchkiss H35 and H38 tanks captured as well. The Germans used these captured vehicles to equip several smaller units which were then combined into Panzer-Abteilung 211 on 22 March 1941.

== Operation Silver Fox ==
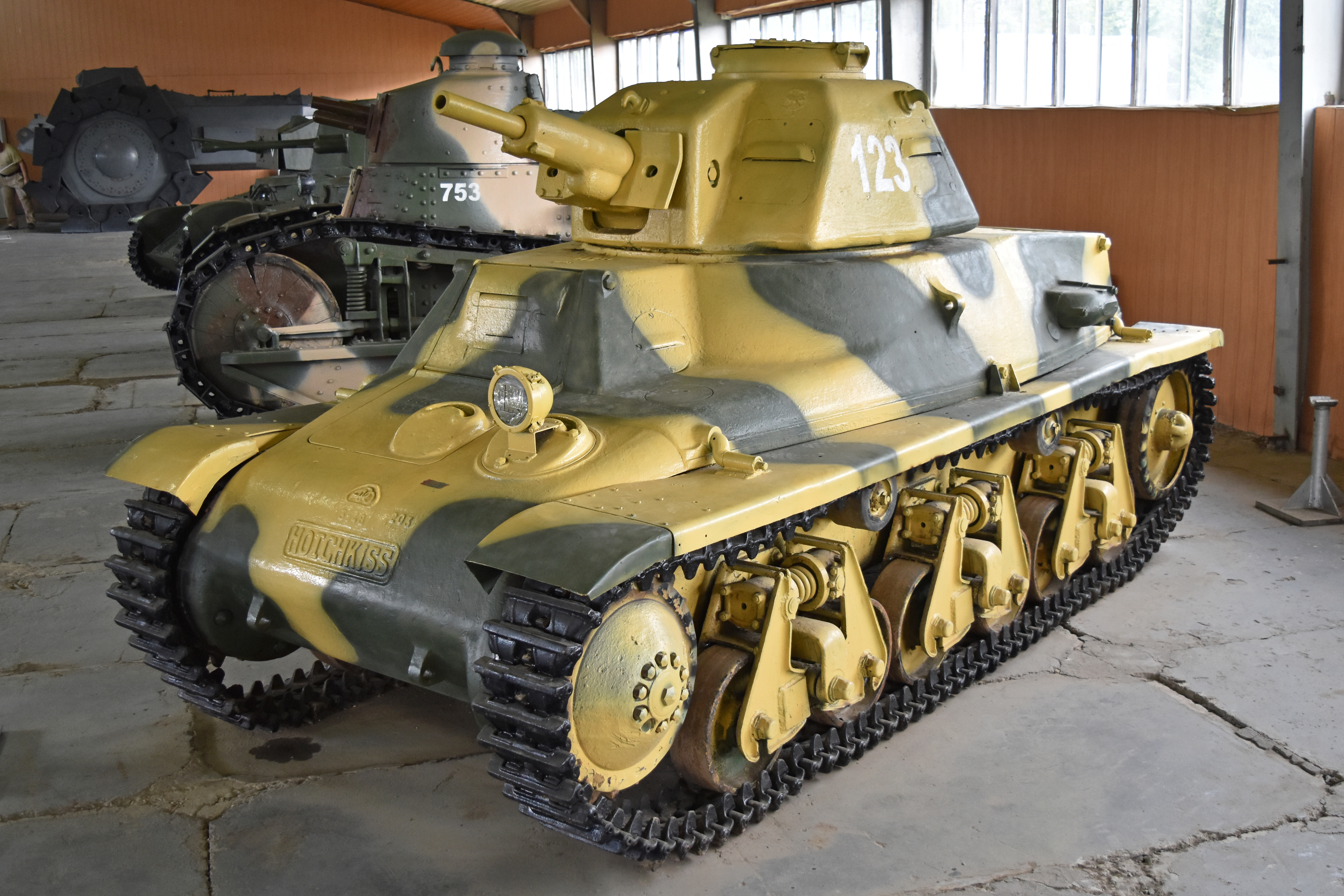
Hotchkiss H39 tank at the Kubinka Tank Museum. This example was formerly used by Panzer-Abteilung 211 and was captured by the Red Army in 1941.

The Soviet port of Murmansk was a high-value target for German command in 1941. On 27 June 1941 they began Operation Silver Fox to capture the key port, Panzer-Abteilung 211 was tasked with supporting the combined German and Finnish force along with Panzer-Abteilung 40 which was equipped with Panzer I and Panzer II tanks. This force would participate in a sub-operation of Operation Silver Fox code-named Operation Arctic Fox which was a campaign against Soviet Northern Front defenses at Salla, Finland in July 1941. The offensive launched on 1 July 1941 ended on 17 November in a stalemate with German and Finnish forces advancing but not being able to capture Murmansk nor the railway at Kandalaksha.

The Abteilung remained in the area around Alakurtti without much action until September 1944.

== Lapland War ==
In the autumn of 1944, the 1st company was still under the command of the XXXVI Mountain Corps. On 8 September, she lost 11 tanks to Soviet T-34s. The 2nd company was with Kampfgruppe West, which had the task of securing the rear guard of the retreating XVIII Mountain Corps. Between 21 and 28 September, the Abteilung belonged to the Divisions-Gruppe Kräutler. When the so-called Lapland War between the Finns and the Germans broke out at the end of September 1944, large parts of the Abteilung were in the vicinity of Rovaniemi, but after the Finnish landing at Tornio, 2nd Company was sent back to Kemi on 1 October and subordinated to Kampfgruppe Tornio for the attack in the direction of Tornio. The attacks of the Germans failed and that cost the company several tanks. The Abteilung came under the XVIII Mountain Corps from 10 October. In mid-October, the Abteilung was with Kampfgruppe Esch until it was moved to Norway, where it arrived on October 28, 1944. The Abteilung remained in Narvik for the rest of the war.

== End ==
The Abteilung capitulated on 8 May 1945 together with all German troops in Norway.

== Sources ==
- Kuusela, Kari. Panzers in Finland: Panzerunits in Finland 1941-1944.
- several authors – Jatkosodan historia, osat 1 – 6 (The History of the Continuation War, Vol. 1 - 6)
- Georg Tessin – Verbände und Truppen der deutschen Wehrmacht und Waffen-SS im Zweiten Weltkrieg 1939-1945, Achter Band: Die Landstreitkräfte 201-280.
