= Verman (river) =

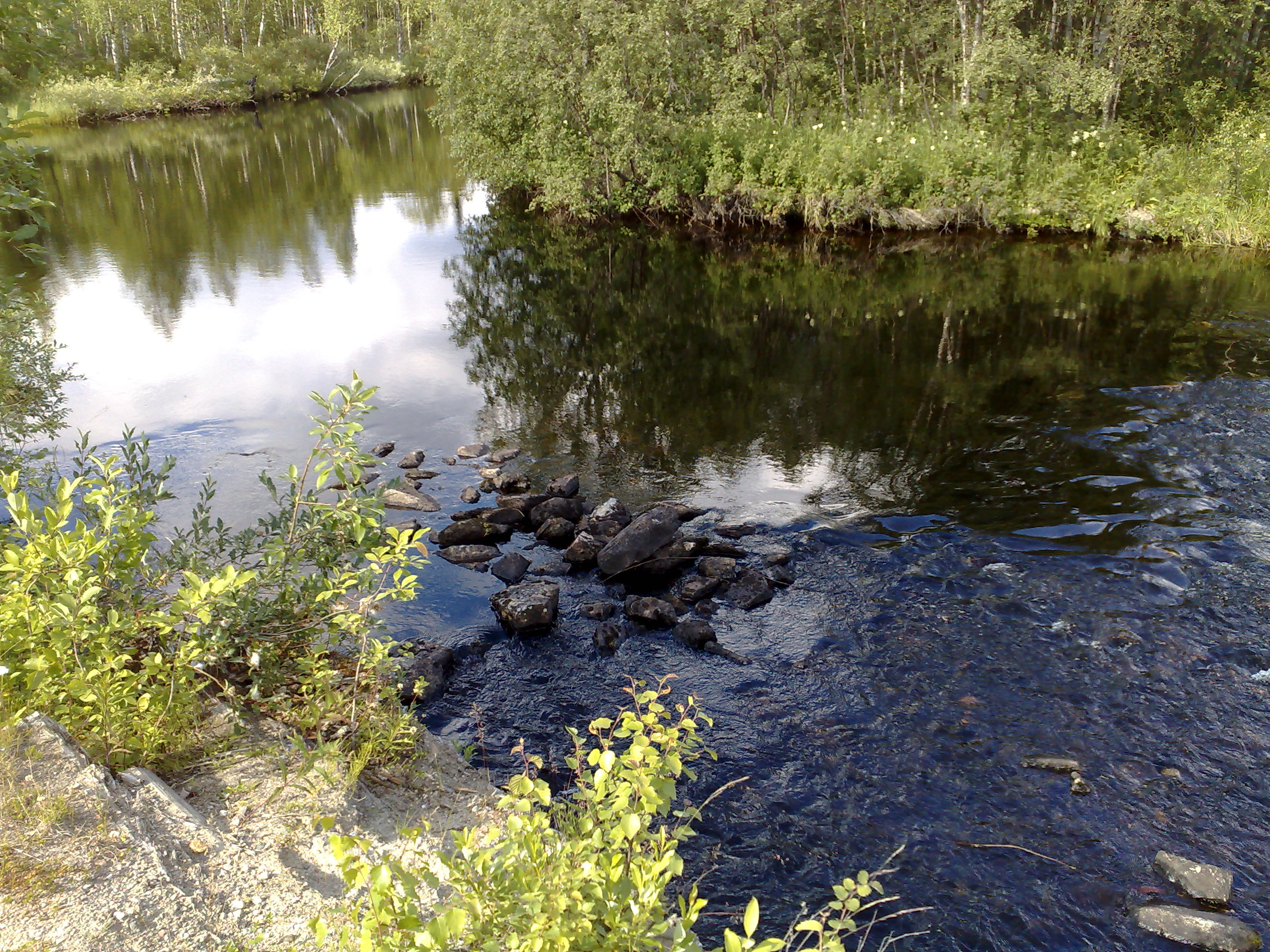

Location
- Country: Russia
- Region: Murmansk Oblast

Physical characteristics
- Source
  - location: Southern slopes of Mount Repotunturi
  - elevation: 250 m (820 ft)
- Mouth: Lake Tolvand
  - coordinates: 66.9183°N 31.2098°E
  - elevation: 97 m (318 ft)
- Length: 38 km (24 mi)
- Basin size: 291 km^{2} (112 sq mi)

Basin features
- Progression: Lake Tolvand→ Tolvand→ Lake Kovdozero→ Kovda→ White Sea

The Verman (Russian: Верман, Finnish: Vermanjoki) is a river in Murmansk Oblast, Russia. For much of the Arctic Campaign of World War II stretches of it formed the front line, and much fighting occurred there.

== Course and description ==
The river is located in the southwestern part of Murmansk Oblast. It is called the Lower, Middle, and Upper Verman respectively in its lower, middle and upper reaches. Its source is on the southern slopes of Mount Repotunturi, 17 kilometres (11 mi) northeast of the village of Alakurtti. From there the river flows eastward and then, skirting Pogranichnaya Hill, it turns south and empties into the southwestern part of Lake Tolvand. It is 38 kilometres (24 mi) long, and has a drainage basin of 291 square kilometres (112 sq mi). It has a width of 20–37 metres (66–121 ft), a depth of up to 2 metres (6.6 ft), and a flow rate of 0.3–1.0 metre per second (0.98–3.28 ft/s).

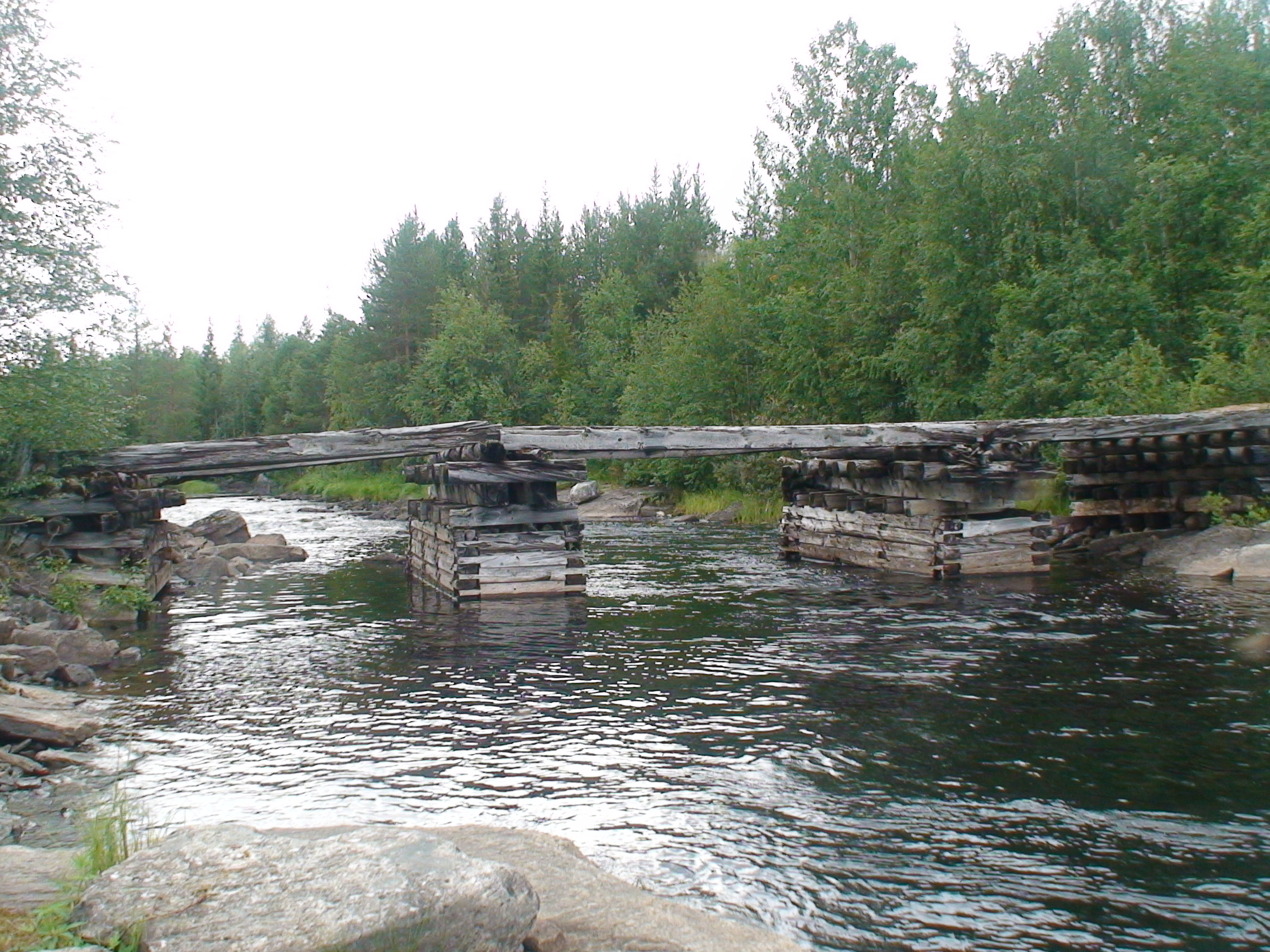
Bridge near the mouth of the Verman River

The river flows through a hilly terrain covered with forests of pine, fir, and (in the upper reaches) birch, with the trees up to 12–15 metres (39–49 ft) tall. In some places the river flows through swamps more than 2 metres (6.6 ft) deep. The height of the surrounding hills reaches 400–560 metres (1,310–1,840 ft) in the upper reaches and 320 metres (1,050 ft) at the mouth. The highest hills on the Lower Verman are Voyta (409.4 metres (1,343 ft)), Kruglaya (342 metres (1,122 ft)), Pogranichnaya (366 metres (1,201 ft)), Voyanvara (562 metres (1,844 ft)), and Repotunturi (480 metres (1,570 ft)).

There are heavy rapids in places. Immediately before the mouth is a 1 metre (3.3 ft) waterfall. There are several small unnamed islands in the river, and several relatively small tributaries, not shown on most maps.

== Settlements and transportation ==
There are a few small settlements on the river. In several places there are rail lines and roads, including some all–weather roads. The Murman Railway crosses the Verman just above the mouth. From the late 1940s until 1971 a railway station was located 1 mile (1.6 km) east of the river. A small 18-metre (59 ft) 8–ton capacity bridge is located at the mouth of the river, and just north of there the Alakurtti–Kandalaksha highway crosses the river. At this point there is also a 20-metre (66 ft) 40–ton capacity wooden bridge. Several all–weather roads cross the river upstream, at fords. On the slopes of Pogranichnaya there is a ruined bridge.

== The river in World War II ==
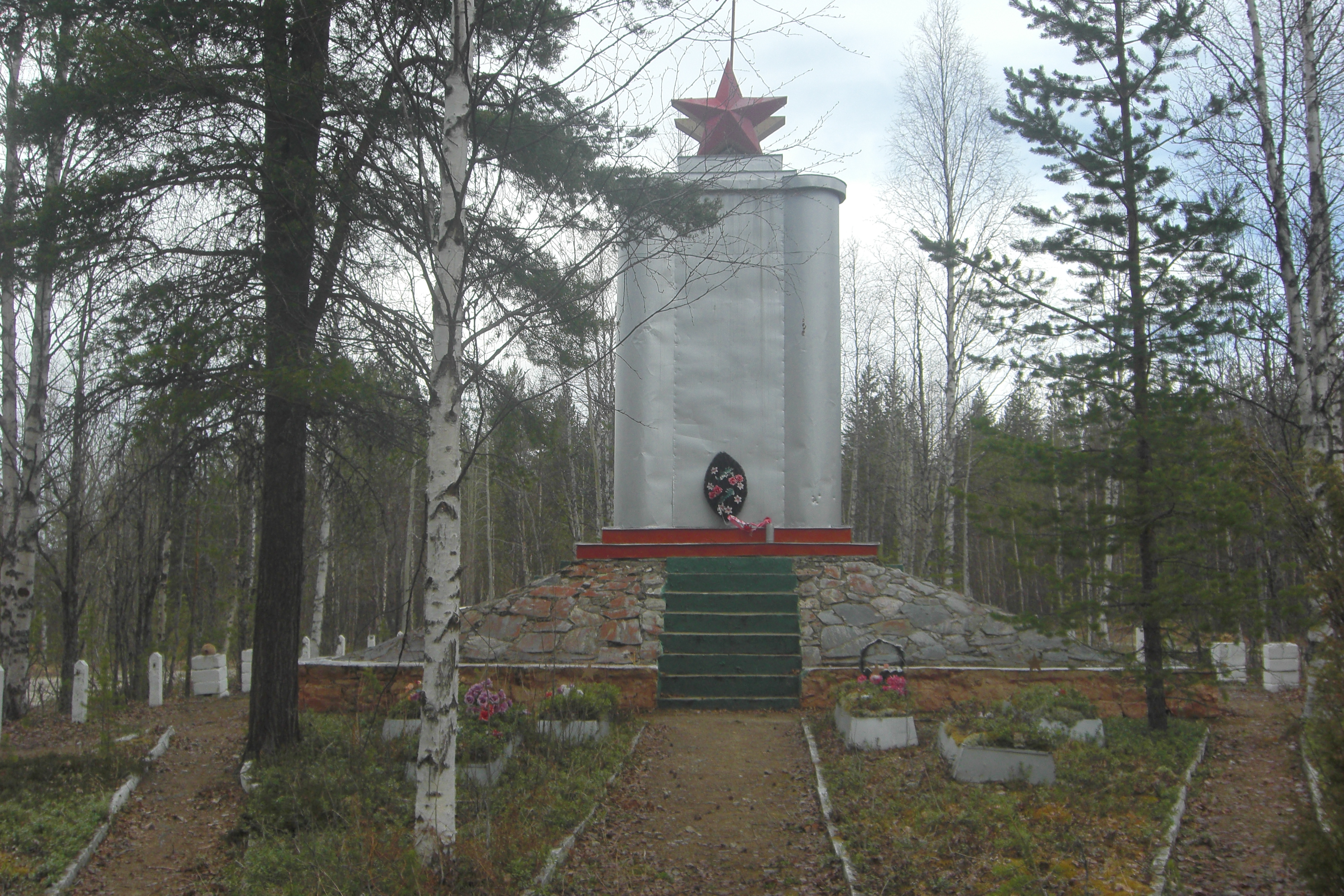
War Memorial on the Verman

In the northernmost sector of the Continuation War, the part of the river in the area around Kandalaksha defined the front line from September 17, 1941 until September 1944. On both banks of the river there are numerous ruins of military installations, fortifications, trenches, and fences left over from this war.

On the left bank of the river near the highway bridge is a monument in the form of a black obelisk. The obelisk bears the inscription "Soviet soldiers – victors of the Verman Front" and displays the names of the dead and maps of military operations. A little east of the river on the road to Kandalaksha there is a mass grave.

== Gallery ==
Remains of World War II bunkers on the Verman River line

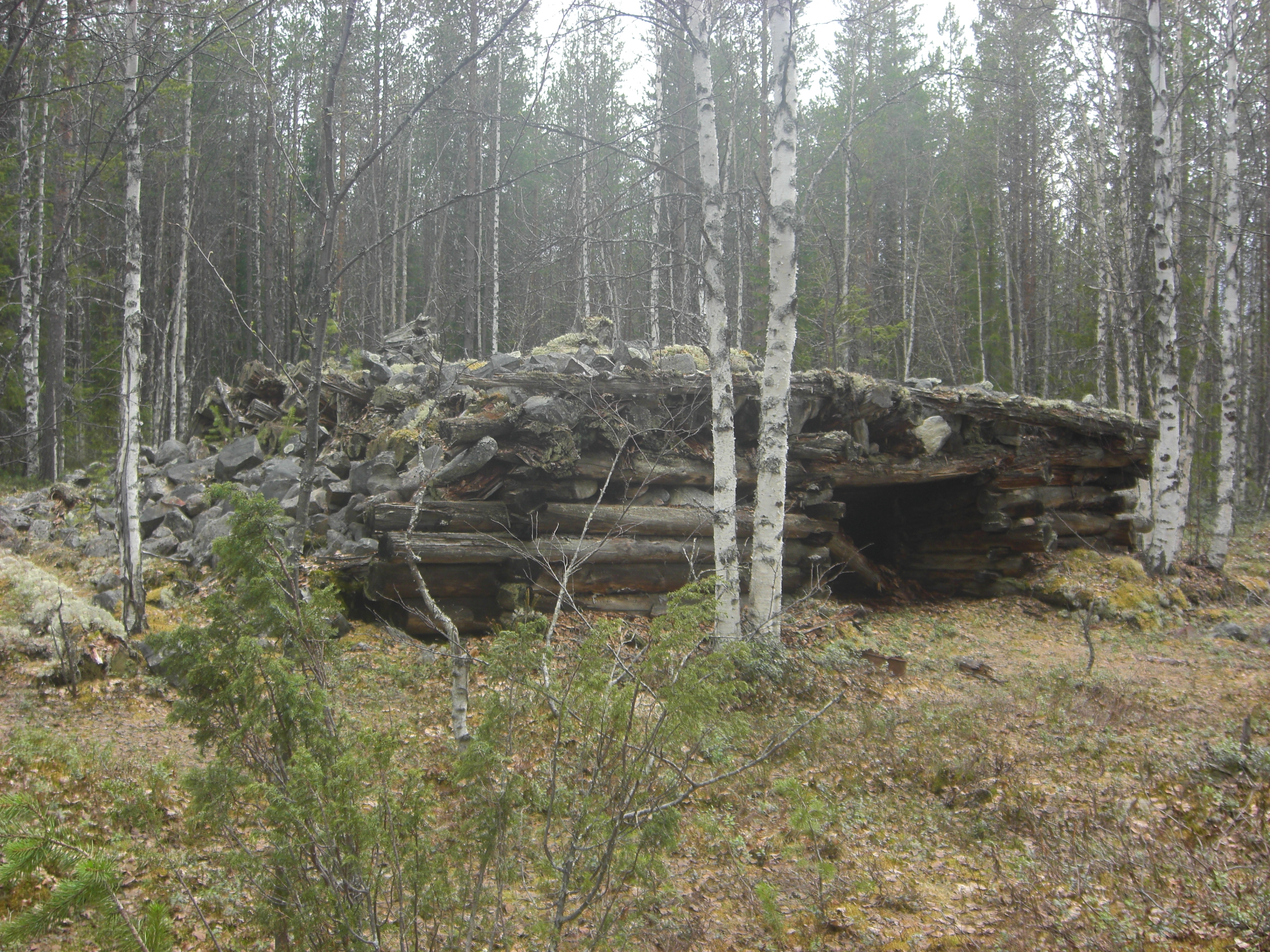

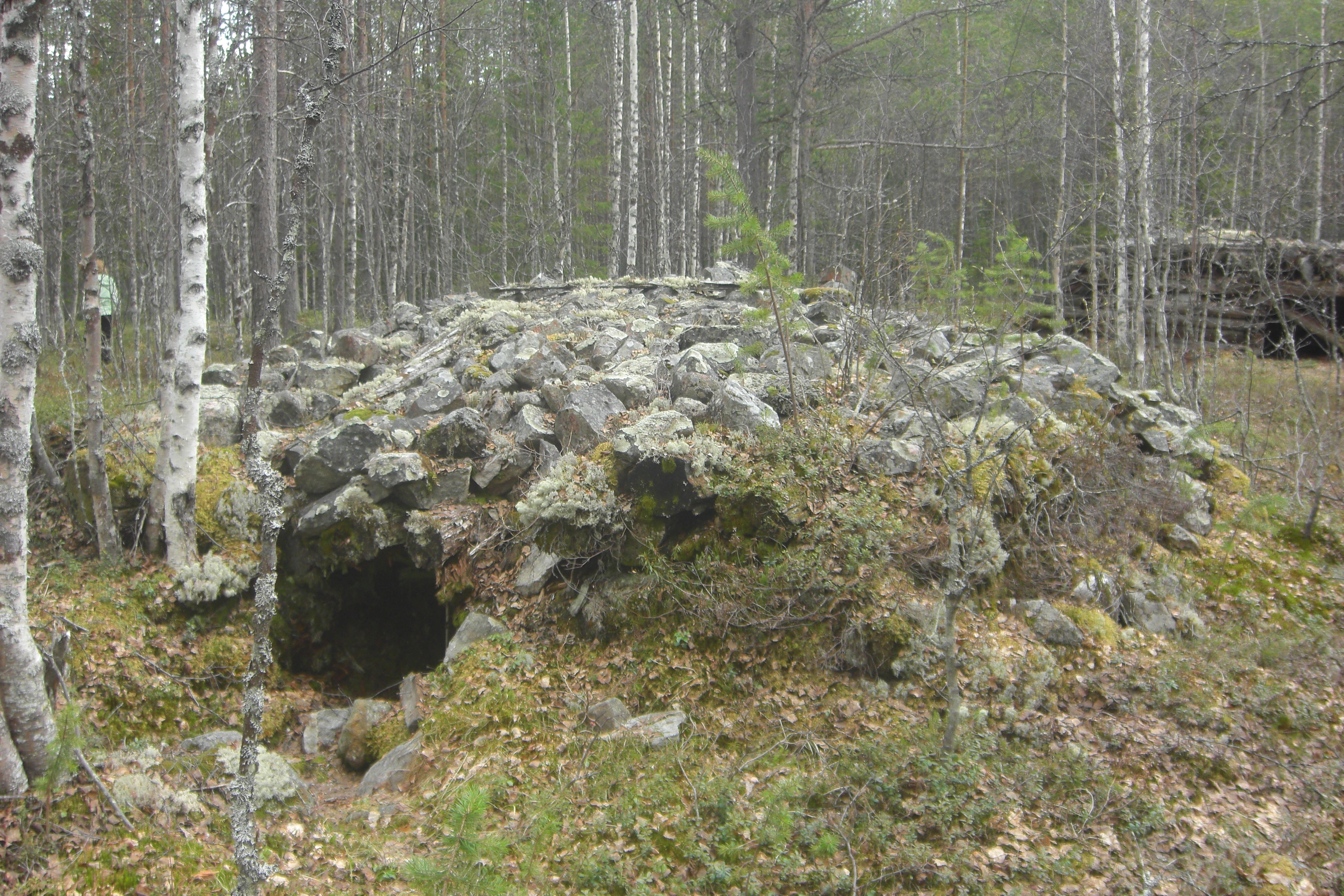

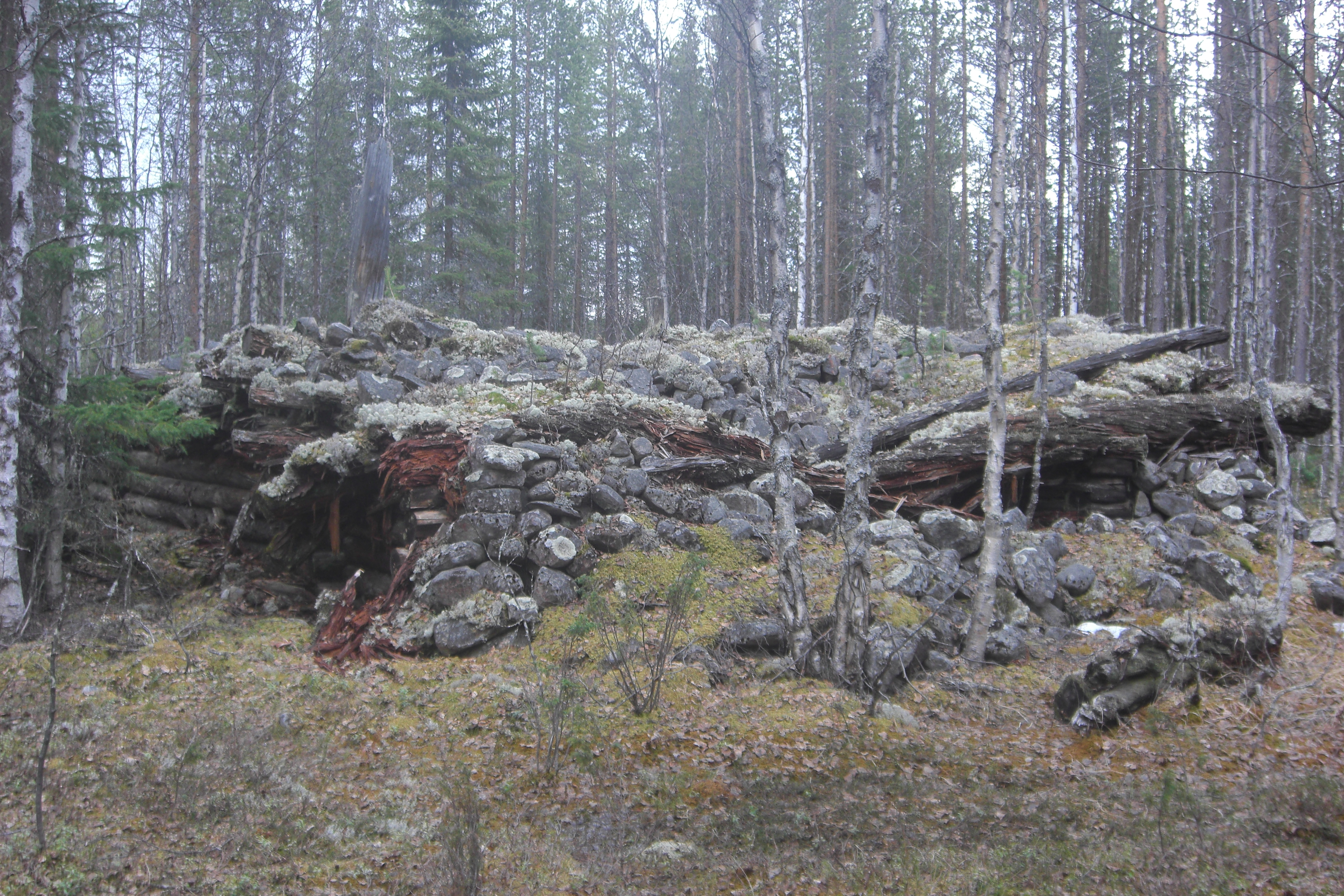
