= Alakurtti (rural locality) =

Alakurtti Алакуртти
- Selo
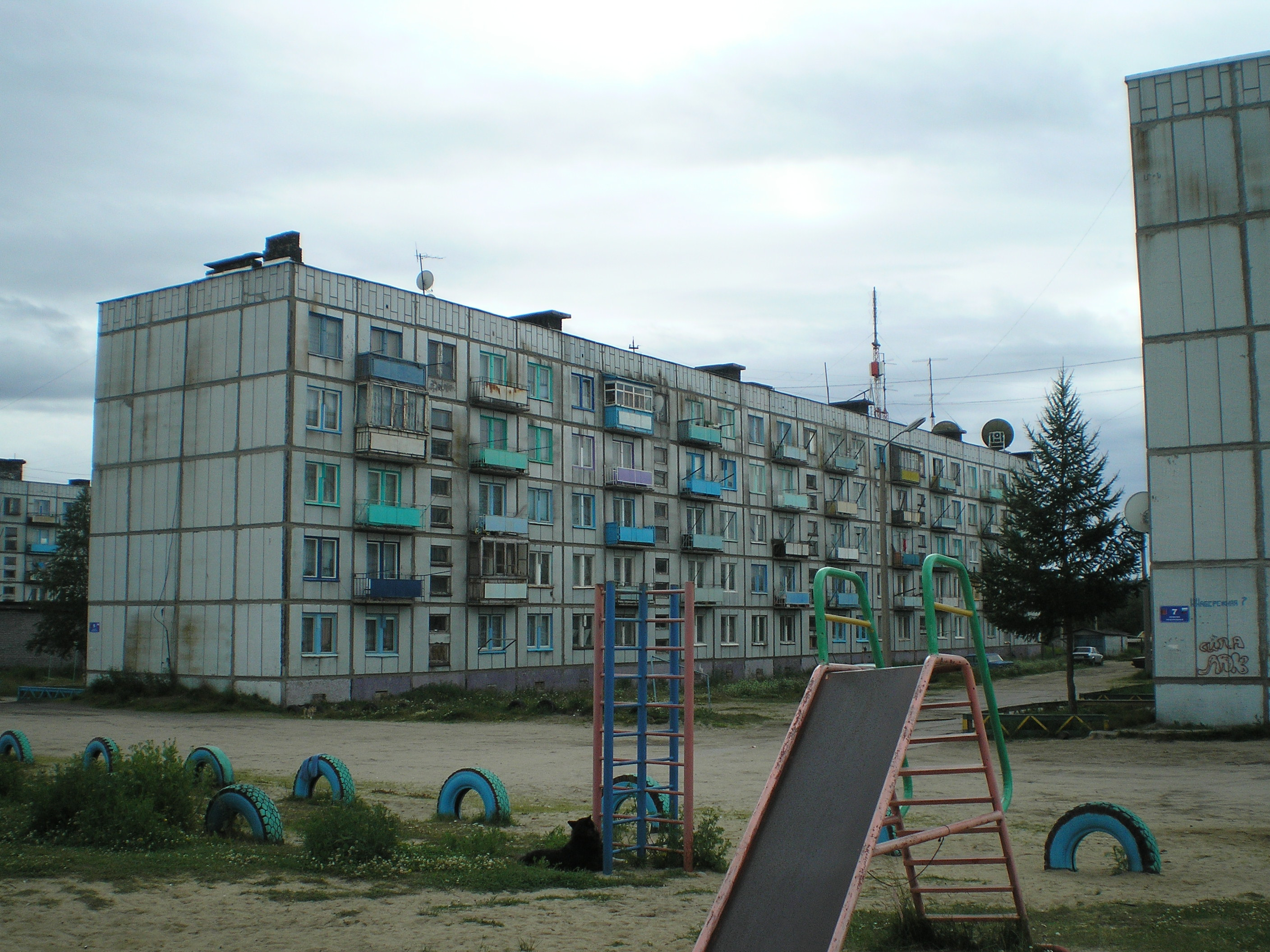
- Residential area in Alakurtti

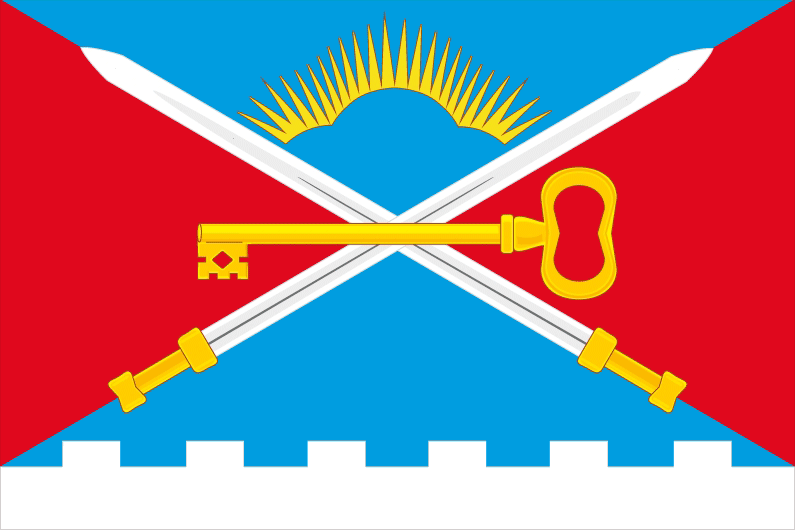
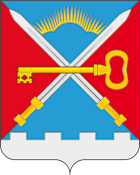
- Flag Coat of arms
- Interactive map of Alakurtti
- Location of Alakurtti Alakurtti (Murmansk Oblast)
- Coordinates: 66°57′N 30°18′E
- Country: Russia
- Federal subject: Murmansk Oblast
- Administrative district: Kandalakshsky District
- Territorial OkrugSelsoviet: Alakurttinsky Territorial Okrug
- Elevation: 161 m (528 ft)

Population (2010 Census)
  - Total: 3,424
  - Estimate (1989): 6,349 (+85.4%)

Municipal status
  - Municipal district: Kandalakshsky Municipal District
  - Rural settlement: Alakurtti Rural Settlement
- Time zone: UTC+3 (MSK)
- Postal code: 184060
- Dialing code: +7 81533
- OKTMO ID: 47608403101

Alakurtti (Russian: Алакуртти) is a rural locality (a selo) in Kandalakshsky District of Murmansk Oblast, Russia, located north of the Arctic Circle at an altitude of 192 meters (630 ft) above sea level. Its population at the 2010 Census was 3,424. Before 1953 it was part of the Karelo-Finnish Soviet Socialist Republic, and was part of Finland up until 1940.
