= XXXVI Mountain Corps =

- Generalkommando XXXVI. (Gebirgs-)Armeekorps (röm. 36 .Geb.AK.)
- Active: 19 October 1939 – 8 May 1945
- Country: Germany

The XXXVI Corps was a German military formation in World War II.

It was formed in October 1939 and took part in the invasion of France. In August 1940 the corps was moved to southern Norway and from there to northern Finland. It took part in Operation Barbarossa in mid-1941. It was part of the German AOK Norwegen (Army Norway) and was moved to northern Finland during June 1941. The XXXVI Corps took part in Operation Polarfuchs aiming to advance through Salla to Kandalaksha, and from there to Murmansk. In November 1941 the corps was renamed the XXXVI Gebirgskorps (Mountain Corps).

In late 1944 the corps had to fight its former allies during their withdrawal from Finland. The corps was forced to retreat from Finland back to Norway. The corps stayed the rest of the war in Norway and surrendered there in May 1945.

== Commanders ==
- General of the Cavalry Hans Feige (Mai 1940 - 30 November 1941)
- General of the Infantry Karl Weisenberger (1 December 1941 - 10 August 1944)
- General of Mountain troops Emil Vogel (10 August 1944 - 8 May 1945)

== Area of operations ==
Date	Area	Subordinate to	Operations
October 5, 1939	Poland	OB Ost	Fall Weiss
June 5–30, 1940	France	AOK 16	Fall Gelb
July 3 - October 4, 1940	France	AOK 1	-
October 30 - December 19, 1940	Norway	Gruppe XXI	Operation Weserübung
December 19, 1940 - June 22, 1942	Finland	AOK Norwegen	Operation Polarfuchs
June 22, 1942 - April 24, 1945	Finland, Norway	GebAOK 20	Operation Birke

== Organisation ==
=== Formations ===
- 71st Infantry Division (to August 1940)
- 212th Infantry Division (to August 1940)
- SS Division Nord (from June 1941 to July 1941, transferred to Finnish III Corps)
- 169th Infantry Division
- 163rd Infantry Division (from 1942)
- Finnish 6th Division (from June 1941 to 1942)

=== Units ===
- Panzer-Abteilung 211
- Panzer-Abteilung 40
- 16. RajaJK (Finnish Border guard company)
- 26. RajaJK (Finnish Border guard company)
- 46. RajaJK (Finnish Border guard company)

== Bibliography ==
- Tessin, Georg. Verbände und Truppen der deutschen Wehrmacht und Waffen–SS im Zweiten Weltkrieg 1939–1945 [Units and Troops of the German Military and Waffen-SS in the Second World War 1939–1945] (in German). Vol. 5: Die Landstreitkräfte 31–70 (Ground Units 31–70). Osnabrück: Biblio.
