= Army Norway (Wehrmacht) =

- German: Armee Norwegen
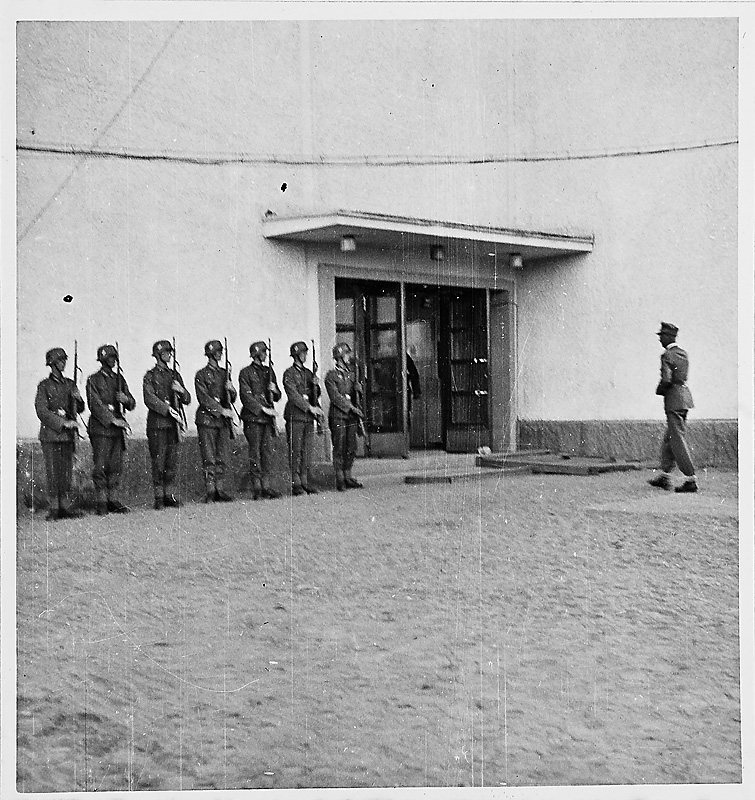
- Visit of Josef Terboven (far right), Reichskommissar for Norway, to the AOK Norwegen headquarters in Oslo, 1942
- Active: December 1940 – December 1944
- Country: Nazi Germany
- Branch: German army ( Wehrmacht)
- Size: Army
- Engagements: Eastern Front

Commanders
- Notable commanders: Eduard Dietl; Lothar Rendulic

Army Norway (Armeeoberkommando Norwegen, 'Army Supreme Command Norway' abbreviated AOK Norwegen) was a German army operating in Norway and Finland during World War II. It was one of the two army echelon headquarters controlling German troops in the far north. Army Norway was directly subordinate to OKH, the high command headquarters of the Wehrmacht. It was created from Army Group XXI in December 1940, itself a successor of the XXI Army Corps, and disbanded in December 1944, with its tasks and assets taken over by the 20th Mountain Army.

As of 15 January 1941, the actual strength (Iststärke) of Army Norway was 129,759 personnel in total.

== Operations ==
On 27 June 1941, shortly after the beginning of Operation Barbarossa (22 June), Army Norway consisted of XXXVI Command (SS Kampfgruppe Nord, 169th Division), Mountain Corps Norway (2nd Mountain Division, 3rd Mountain Division, 199th Division, 702nd Division), XXXIII Command (181st Division, 196th Division) and LXX Command (69th Division, 163rd Division, 214th Division).

A Headquarter Detachment of Army Norway took part in Operation Barbarossa in 1941. In talks between Finnish and German staffs in Helsinki in June 1941, the Germans were given military responsibility over northern Finland; Army Norway was to take Murmansk and the Murmansk railway. The plan was codenamed Operation Silberfuchs (Silver Fox). In January 1942 this HQ detachment became Army Lapland and was responsible for all German forces in Finland. In June 1942 it was renamed 20th Mountain Army.

== Commanders ==
=== Commander-in-Chief ===
| No. | Portrait | Commander | Took office | Left office | Time in office |
|---|---|---|---|---|---|
| 1 | Nikolaus von Falkenhorst | Generaloberst; Nikolaus von Falkenhorst (1885–1968) | 19 December 1940 | 18 December 1944 | 4 years, 0 days |

== Assets ==
German Army of Norway (Falkenhorst)

- From January 1941:
  - XXXIII Corps
  - XXXVI Corps
  - Mountain Corps Norway
- From July 1941: (during Operation Silberfuchs)
  - XXXIII Corps
  - XXXVI Corps
  - LXX Corps
  - Mountain Corps Norway
- From September 1941:
  - XXXIII Corps
  - XXXVI Corps
  - LXX Corps
  - Mountain Corps Norway
  - Finnish III Corps
- From March 1942: (after creation of German Twentieth Mountain Army)
  - XXXIII Corps
  - LXX Corps
  - LXXI Corps

== See also ==
- 20th Mountain Army
