= Kirov Railway =

Railway line in Russia

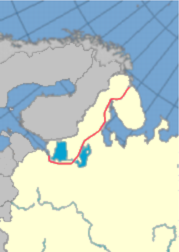
Railway between Murmansk on the Arctic Ocean and Saint Petersburg on the Baltic Sea

The Kirov Railway (Russian: Кировская железная дорога, romanized: Kirovskaya zheleznaya doroga; until 1935 Murman Railway) is a 1,520 mm (4 ft 11 27/32 in) broad gauge Russian railway network that links the Murman Coast and Murmansk city (in the north) and Saint Petersburg (in the south). The railway is operated by the Arktika passenger train. The total distance between Saint Petersburg and Murmansk is 1,448 km (900 mi), the section between Petrozavodsk and Kola having a length of 1,054 kilometres (655 mi). It has 52 stations. The line is of vital military importance because Murmansk is an ice-free port accessible via the Barents Sea:

The [...] limiting factor in Russian overseas supply [in World War I] was not ocean shipping. Rather, effective use of imports was dependent on the thin line of transportation from the ports to the inland areas. Goods delivered to Vladivostok [...] faced the single, speed- and weight-limited track of the Trans-Siberian railway. Goods that made the tortuous passage to the Murman Coast had even more limited options. The primary Russian port, Arkhangel'sk, was served by a single narrow gauge line, which resulted in tremendous backlogs of stores. While the closure of the port each year during the late winter offered the opportunity to clear out the accumulation, the excess continued to grow. [...] The Allies desperately wanted to avoid the White Sea closure by using the warm water ports of the western Murman Coast or Norway. Throughout the war, the British government pressured Sweden to permit the passage of supplies to Russia, and some limited shipments were made. [...] More promising was the effort to build a seven hundred-mile railway from the ice-free Kola Inlet to the northern terminus of the Russian rail system. The Russian Council of Ministers had funded the effort in December 1914, and construction on each of the three major sections began in 1915. [...] The line was eventually opened on November 28, 1916, too late to impact the Imperial war effort.

The northern part of the line, between Petrozavodsk and Kola, was built in 1915–1917: due to a lack of workers the Tsarist authorities deployed more than 40,000 German and Austrian prisoners of war to the construction.

During World War II the line re-asserted its military importance as a link between the Arctic convoys and the Eastern Front. In 1941–1943, the central part between Svir and Petrozavodsk was occupied by the Finnish Army under orders from Marshal Mannerheim during Continuation War phase of the Second World War.

Originally called the Murman Railway, the line was renamed the Kirov Railway in 1935 in honor of Sergei Kirov (a prominent Bolshevik leader in the 1917 October Revolution), who had been assassinated the year before. In 1959 the Kirov Railway became part of the October Railway. The line was electrified in 2005.

== See also ==
- Murmansk–Nikel Railway
- List of named passenger trains of Russia
