= Battles of Kiestinki =

Battle of the Continuation War

- Part of Operation Silver Fox and the Continuation War
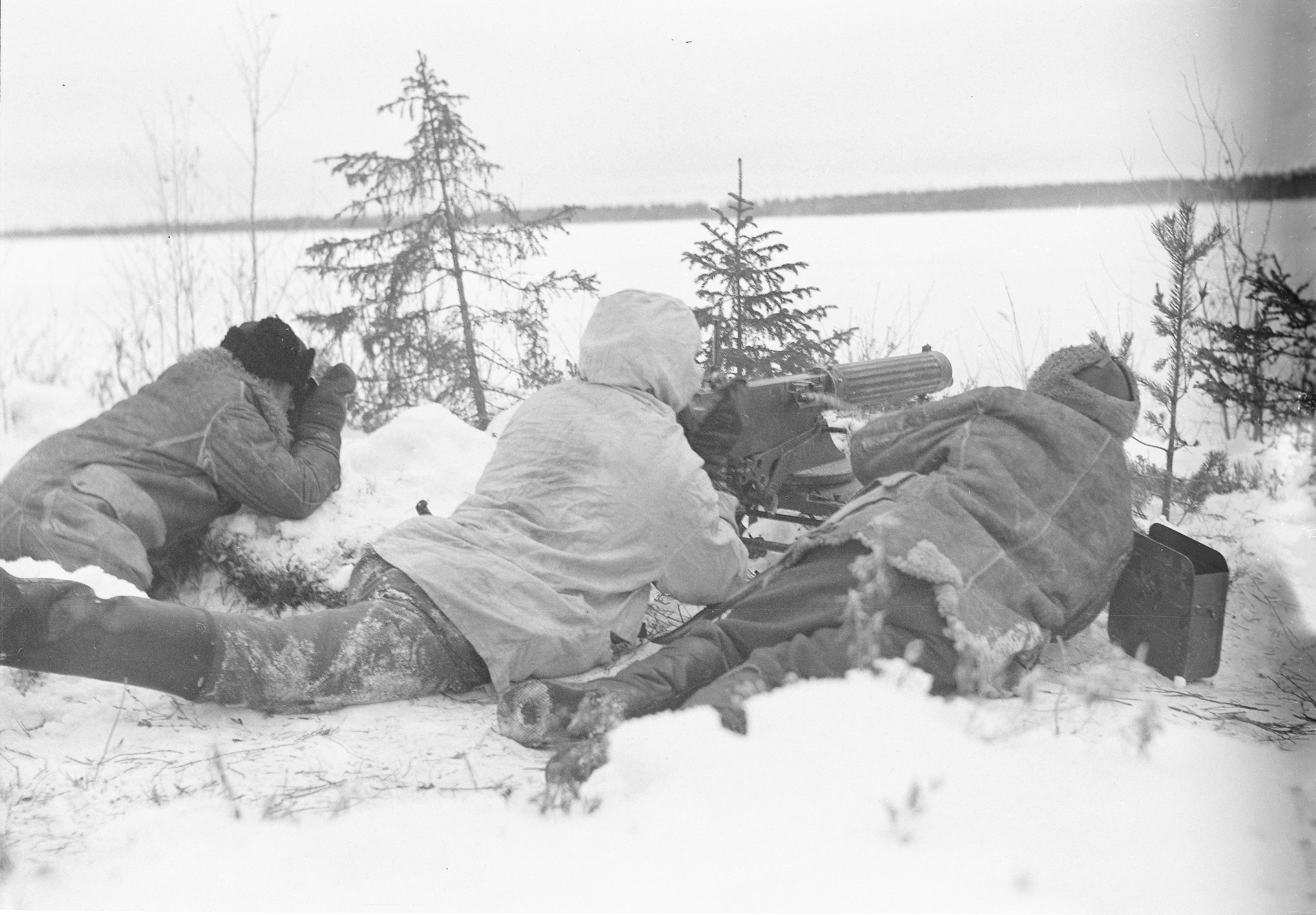
- A Finnish Maxim gun emplacement east of Kestenga
| Date | 1 July 1941 – 10 October 1941 (first phase); 24 April 1942 – 11 May 1942 (second phase) |
| Location | Kiestinki, Karelia (now Kestenga, Russia) |
| Result | Finnish–German control of Kiestinki |

Belligerents
| Germany; Finland | Soviet Union |

Commanders and leaders
| N. von Falkenhorst; Eduard Dietl; Hans Feige; Hjalmar Siilasvuo | Kirill Meretskov; Filipp Gorelenko; Nikolai N. Nikishin; Andrey Zelentsov |

Units involved
| III Corps; 3rd Division; Division J; Army Norway: Mtn. Corps Norway; 2nd Mountain Div.; 3rd Mountain Div.; XXXVI Corps; 169th Infantry Div.; 6th SS-Division Nord (mot.) (Note: Transferred to the Finnish III Corps on 21 July.) | Karelian Front (Note: Split from the Northern Front on 23 August.): 7th Army (1941); 54th Rifle Division; 88th Rifle Division; 26th Army (1942); 8th Ski Brigade; 23rd Guards Rifle Div.; 80th Independent Brigade; 186th Rifle Div. |

Strength
| Estimated 13,000 | Estimated 29,000 |

Casualties and losses
| Estimated 5,000+ combined casualties including killed, wounded, and missing | 3,000 killed (1941); 2,600 as prisoners (1941); 3,145 killed (1942): 8,906 wounded (1942); 598 missing (1942) |

The Battles of Kiestinki (Finnish: Kiestingin taistelut}), also called the Battles of Kestenga, was one of the largest series of battles on the Northern Front during the broader Continuation War as part of Operation Silver Fox. The battles are named after the village of Kiestinki (Russian: Кестеньга), which is situated on the northern shore of Lake Topozero in Karelia.

Individual battles for the village were fought primarily from July to October 1941 and again from April to May 1942, before devolving into trench warfare which continued until the Moscow Armistice in 1944. The first battle was fought by combined forces of the Finnish III Corps under the command of Hjalmar Siilasvuo and German forces of Army Norway under Nikolaus von Falkenhorst, Eduard Dietl, and Hans Feige against Soviet mixed elements of the 7th Army and 14th Army. The second phase of the battle in the spring of 1942 was fought entirely by Soviet troops of the 26th Army under the command of Nikolay Nikishin.

== History ==
=== Background ===
Kiestinki was a village which had been part of the Finnish region of Karelia which was ceded to the Soviet Union following the Winter War and the signing of the Moscow Peace Treaty in March 1940. A section of the Finno-Soviet treaty stipulated that Finland was required to cede portions of the Karelia, Salla, and Kuusamo provinces to the Soviet Union. Roughly 420,000 Karelian refugees were forced to evacuate their homes and resettle in Finland following the treaty.

Finland later invaded Ladoga Karelia and the Karelian Isthmus in July 1941 as part of the broader 1941 Axis invasion of the Soviet Union, specifically in coordination with Operation Silver Fox. Kiestinki was one of the primary objectives of the Finnish III Army Corps due to its strategic position on the north shore of Lake Topozero (Finnish: Tuoppajärvi) and that the city was a spur line of the larger Murmansk Railroad. In order to successfully cut off the Soviet port of Murmansk, Finnish and German troops would have to capture Kiestinki and its surrounding settlements, this was part of the broader objective of Führer Directive 34 which also included the task of capturing the settlements of Kandalaksha and Loukhi which were also situated on the Murmansk railway.

=== 1941 battle ===
The first battle for Kiestinki, also called the Kestenga Defensive Operation by Soviet sources, lasted from early July to mid-October 1941. During the initial attacking phase of the battle the area of Kiestinki was defended by a mix of Soviet troops of the Soviet 7th Army and 14th Army of the Karelian Front, including the 54th Rifle Division. The unit which spearheaded the initial attacks on Kiestinki was the Finnish 53rd Infantry Regiment (Jalkaväkirykmentti 53) under the command of Jussi Turtola. Turtola's troops forced the defending Soviets into a pocket (Finnish: Motti) which suffered a heavy casualty rate but was not defeated in detail.

Kiestinki was officially captured by the Finnish–German coalition on August 7, 1941, although the Stavka attempted to reinforce the 54th Rifle Division by deploying the 88th Rifle Division from Murmansk under the command of Major General Andrey Ivanovich Zelentsov. Zelentsov would later be killed in action on August 15. Soviet losses during 1941 are estimated around 3,000 killed in action and 2,600 as prisoners of war.

=== 1942 battle ===
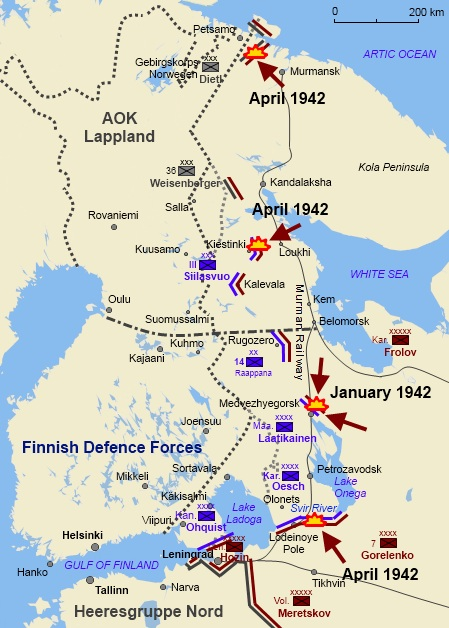
Soviet assaults on Finnish positions in 1942

The 26th Army under Nikolay Nikishin launched a spring counteroffensive against Kiestinki officially dubbed as the Kestenga Offensive Operation on April 24, 1942. The spearhead of the operation was carried out by the 23rd Guards Rifle Division, the 186th Rifle Division, the 80th Independent Brigade, and the 8th Ski Brigade which amassed along the Zapadnaya Litsa. The defenders of Kiestinki were the Finnish III Army Corps, including the 3rd Division and Division J under the command of Siilasvuo and elements of the German XXXVI Mountain Corps, including the 6th SS Mountain Division Nord, all under the command of Eduard Dietl.

The 23rd Guards Division managed to advance only 6–7 kilometers towards Kiestinki, however their progress was hindered due to heavy snowfall. Meanwhile, the Soviet 8th Ski Brigade performed wide flanking maneuvers behind Finnish lines in order to cut Siilasvuo's supply lines, however, by May 5 the brigade had lost the initiative. Frontal assaults were eventually made by the Soviets at Verkhneye Chernoye and Lake Topozero but were held back by defending Finnish and German units. Meanwhile, Dietl was able to reinforce Finnish and German positions with Panzer I's from Panzer-Abteilung 40 along with the entirety of the XXXVI Mountain Corps reserve.

The 6th SS Mountain Division was enveloped by forces of the 23rd Guards Division, the 80th Independent Brigade, and the 8th Ski Brigade before counterattacking utilizing the Finnish motti tactic to break up the Soviet units. The 6th SS Mountain Division and the Finnish Division J of the III Corps were able to halt any further Soviet advances on Kiestinki. Later on April 27 the Soviet 14th Army, including the 10th Guards Division, the 14th Rifle Division, and the 12th Naval Brigade of Russian Naval Infantry, attacked the 6th SS Mountain Division which had been deployed along the Zapadnaya Litsa.

Siilasvuo was ultimately able to defend Kiestinki with 9 battalions from the Finnish III Corps against 2 Soviet divisions and 2 brigades. By May 5 the Soviet 8th Ski Brigade came within two miles of the road just west of Kiestinki, however, marshes and wetlands hindered troop movement and the brigade lost its impetus. In just two days the combined Finnish and German force was able to surround and destroy much of the Soviet force at Kiestinki.

== Casualties and aftermath ==
Dependent on the source the Soviets suffered roughly 12,649 casualties (roughly 3,145 were killed, 8,906 wounded and 598 missing) in the Kiestinki sector during the 1942 spring offensive while combined Finnish and German losses were respectively between 2,500 and 3,200, although some estimate the combined loss as 5,500. According to some Soviet sources, German and Finnish losses are also estimated around 5,000. Some Finnish sources purport Soviet combined casualties as high as 15,000, while the Mountain Corps Norway claimed 8,000 Soviets as killed in action. The 8th Ski Brigade and the 80th Independent Brigade were almost completely destroyed during the 1942 attacks on Kiestinki. The 8th Ski Brigade was reduced to between 300-400 men according to Soviet prisoners of war, or roughly 0.1% (1/10) of its original strength. Likewise, the 23rd Guards Division and the 186th Rifle Division were both reduced to between 30-40% of their original strength. The 6th SS Mountain Division's official losses after the nearly month-long operation was 2 officers and 157 enlisted men killed, and roughly 800 wounded.

The Soviet offensive at Kiestinki ended on May 11, 1942. The offensive failed to achieve its intended objectives and ended with the destruction of several major units manpower, along the capture of a significant amount of Soviet small arms. The frontline along Kiestinki eventually stagnated into trench warfare as Finnish and German forces could no longer push westward towards Loukhi station on the Murmansk railway.

== Gallery ==
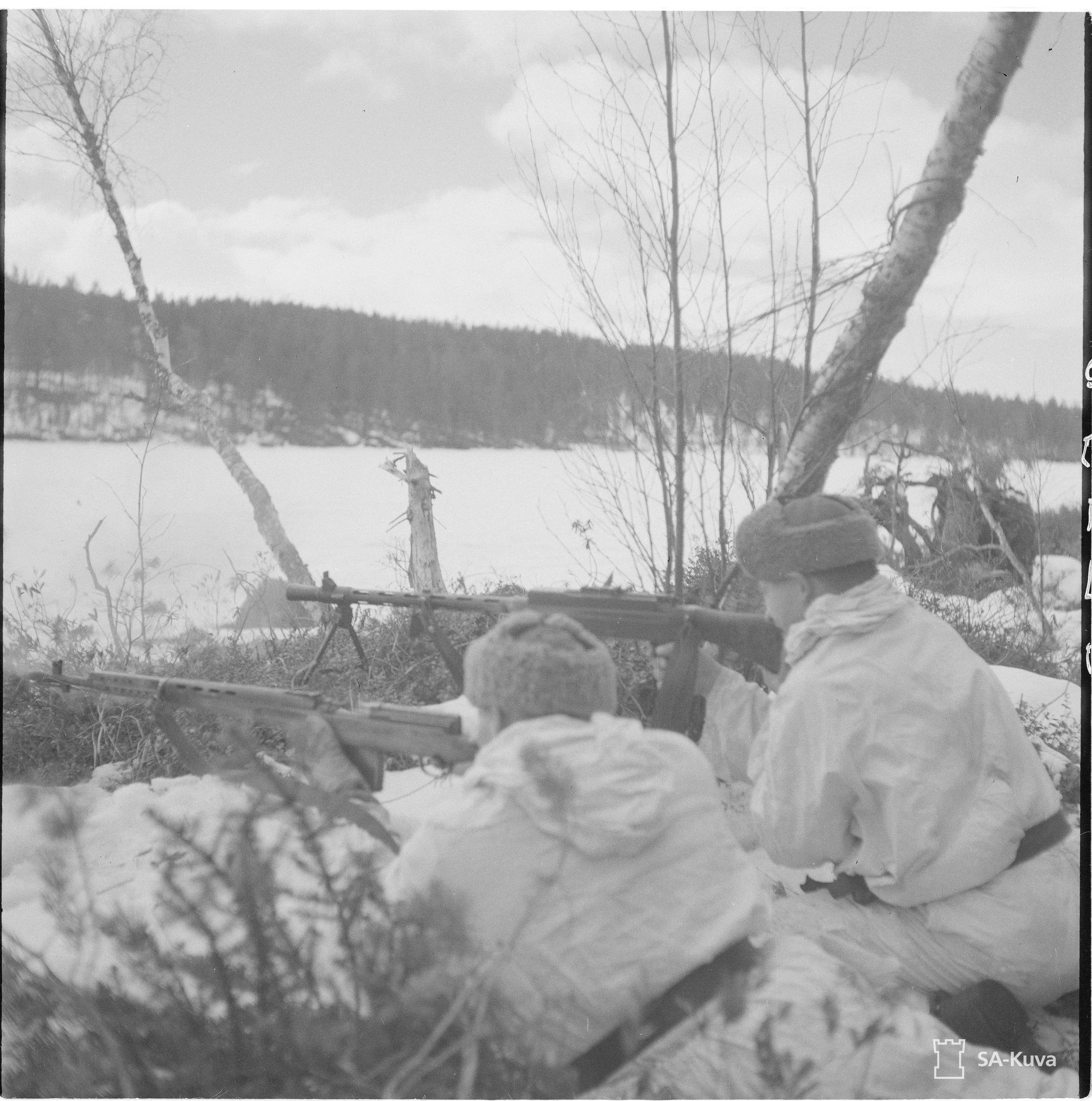
Finnish troops exchanging small arms fire at Lohilahti bay near Kiestinki

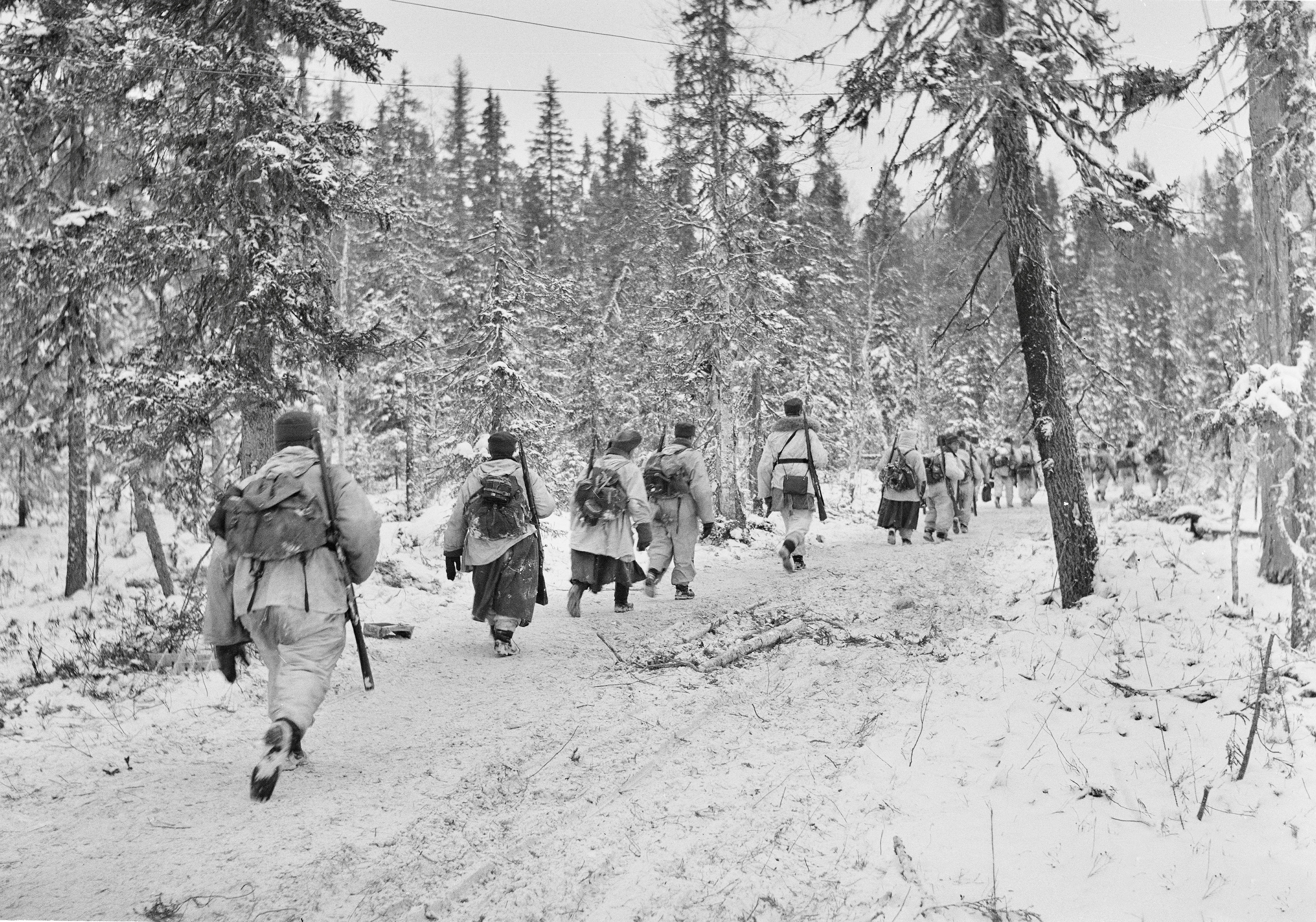
Finnish soldiers moving east of Kestenga

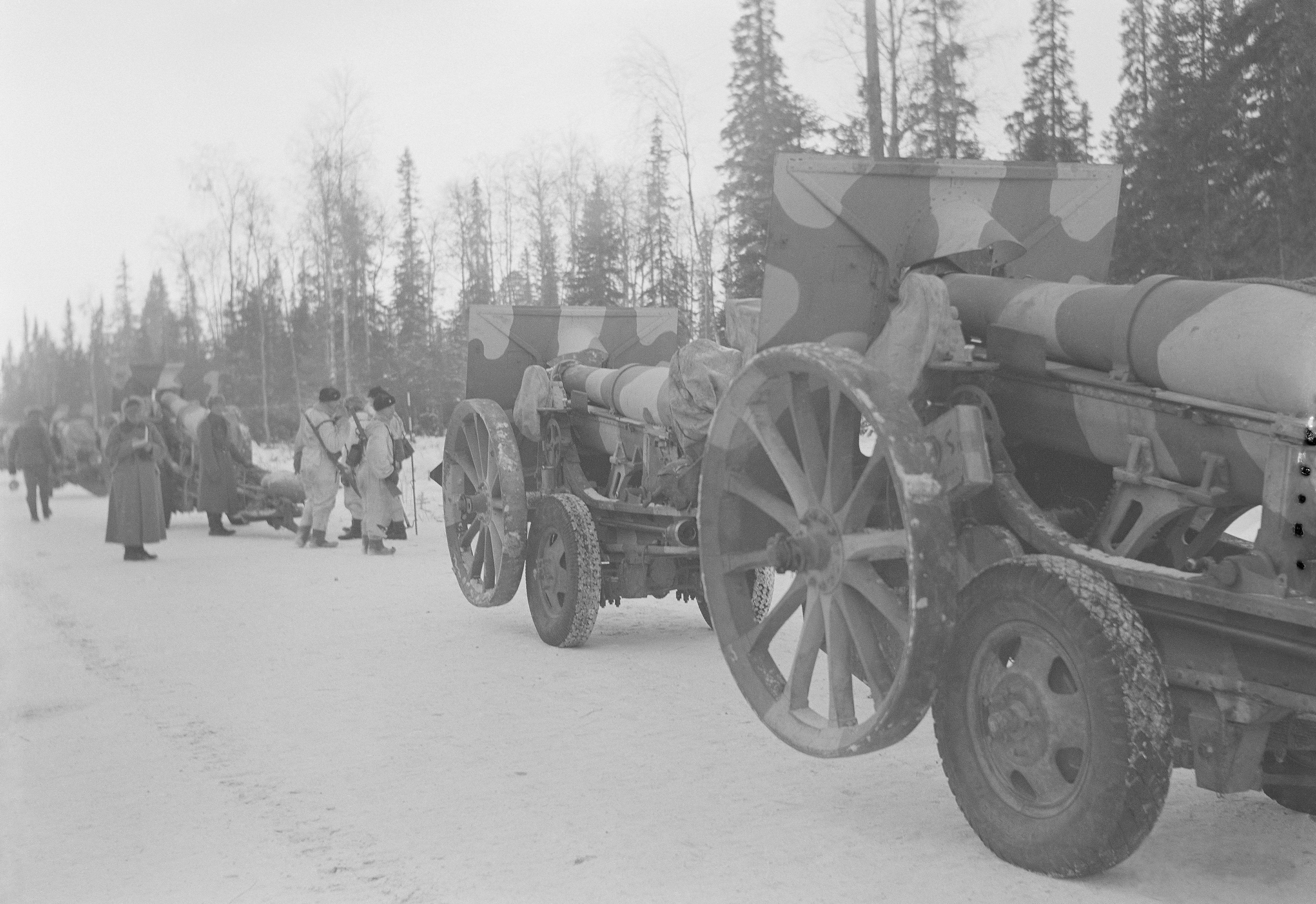
Finnish artillery moving east of Kestenga towards the Murmansk railway

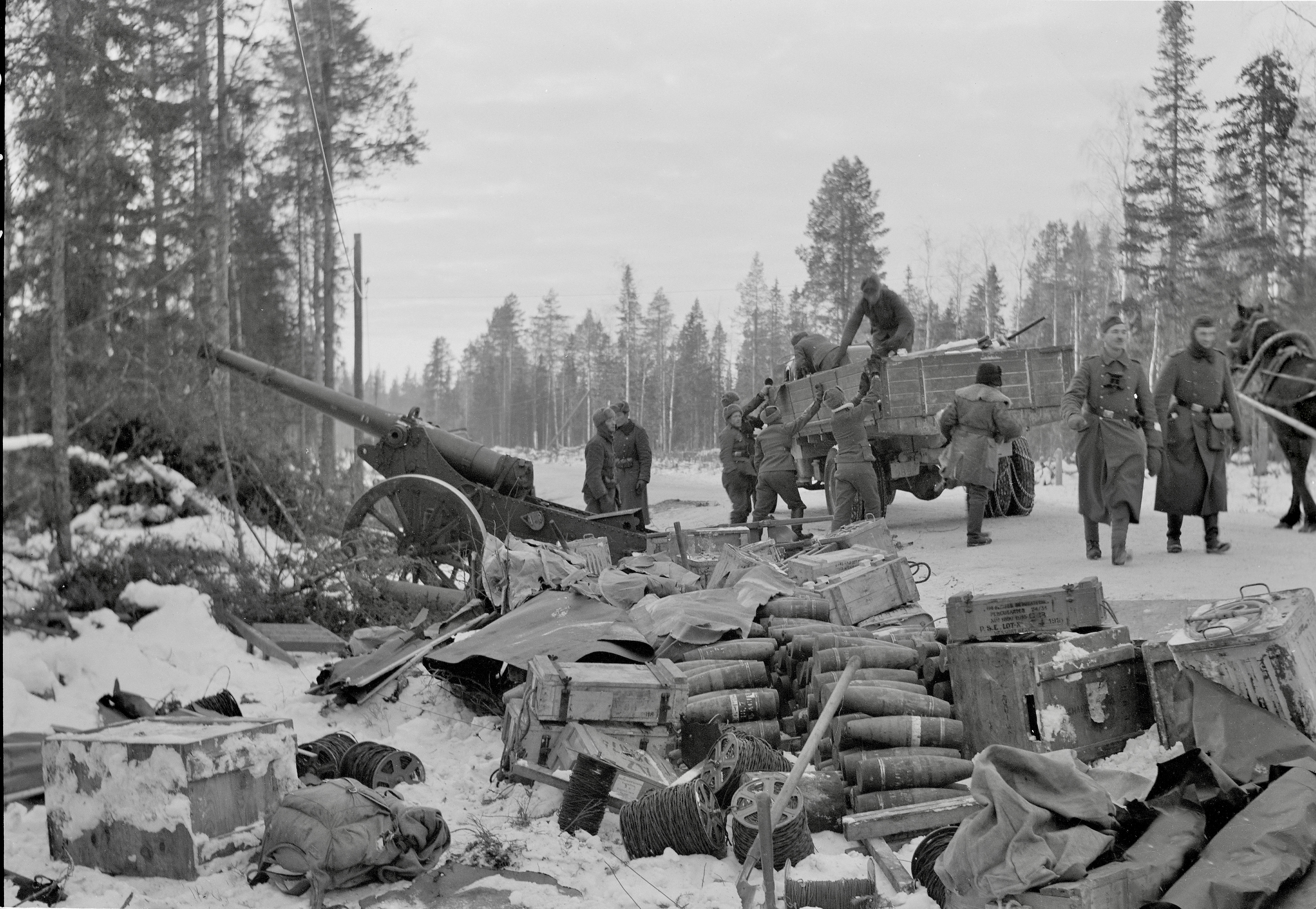
Abandoned Soviet equipment captured by the Finnish east of Kestenga

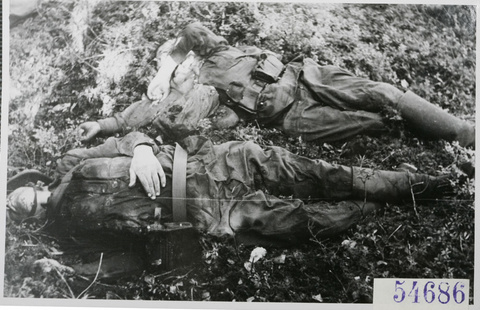
Dead Soviets on the Kestenga Front

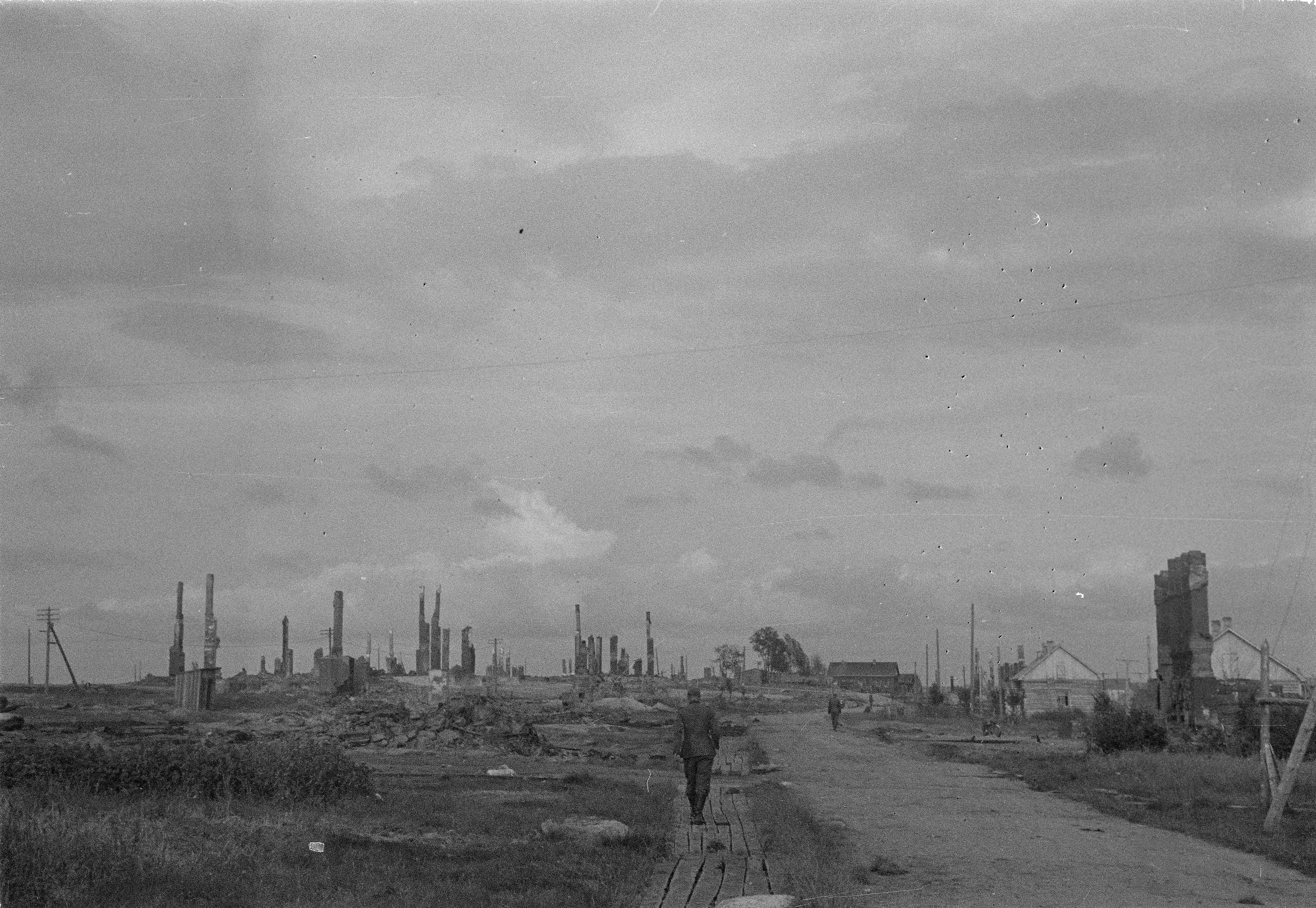
The ruins of Keistinki in 1941

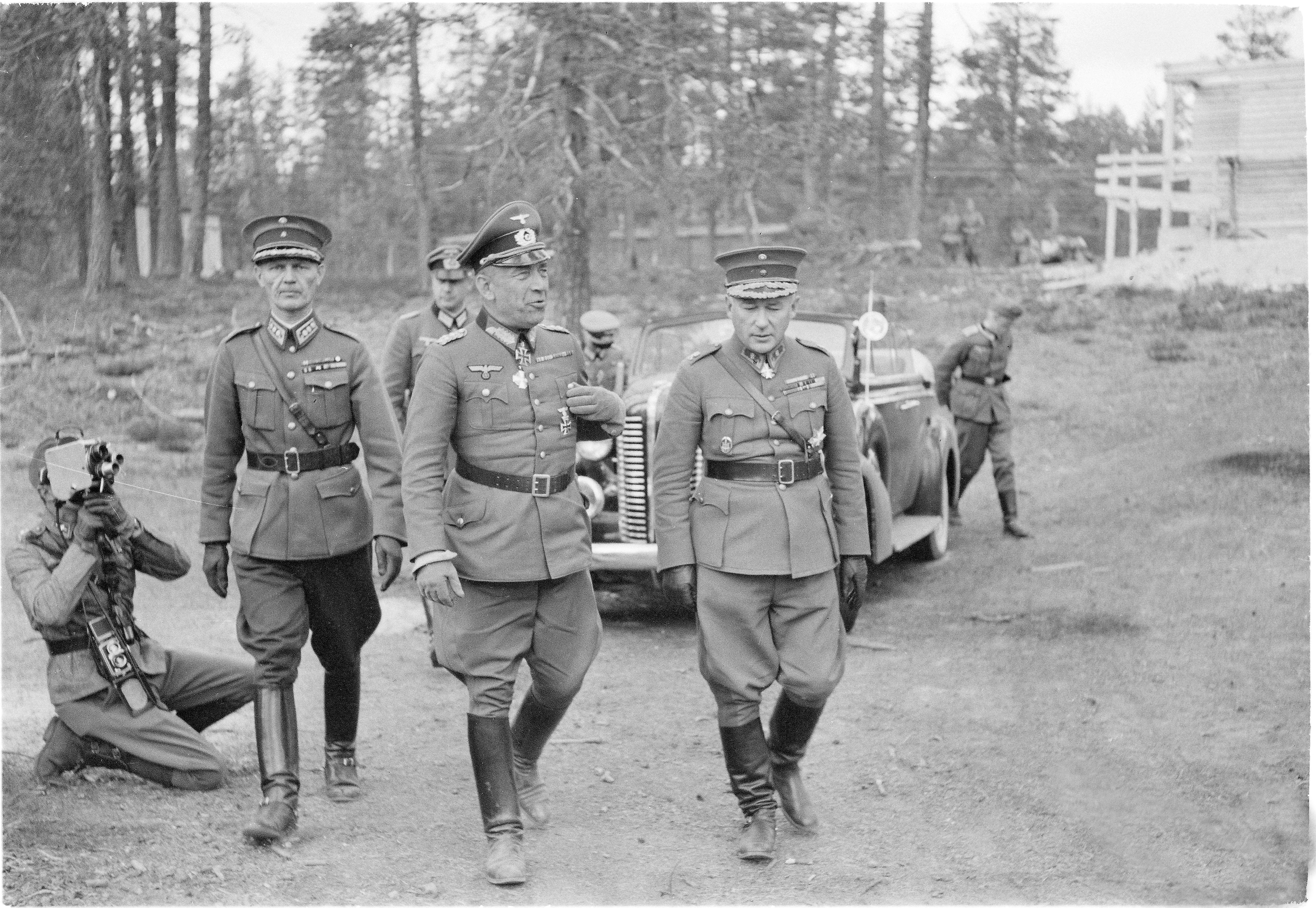
Nikolaus von Falkenhorst meeting Finnish General Hjalmar Siilasvuo

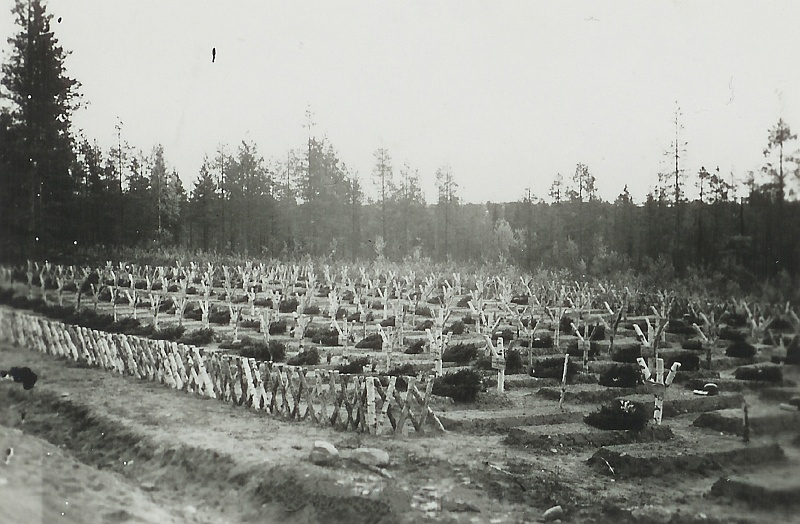
Cemetery of the 6th SS Mountain Division Nord in Kiestinki (Kestenga)
