= Georg Ritter von Hengl =

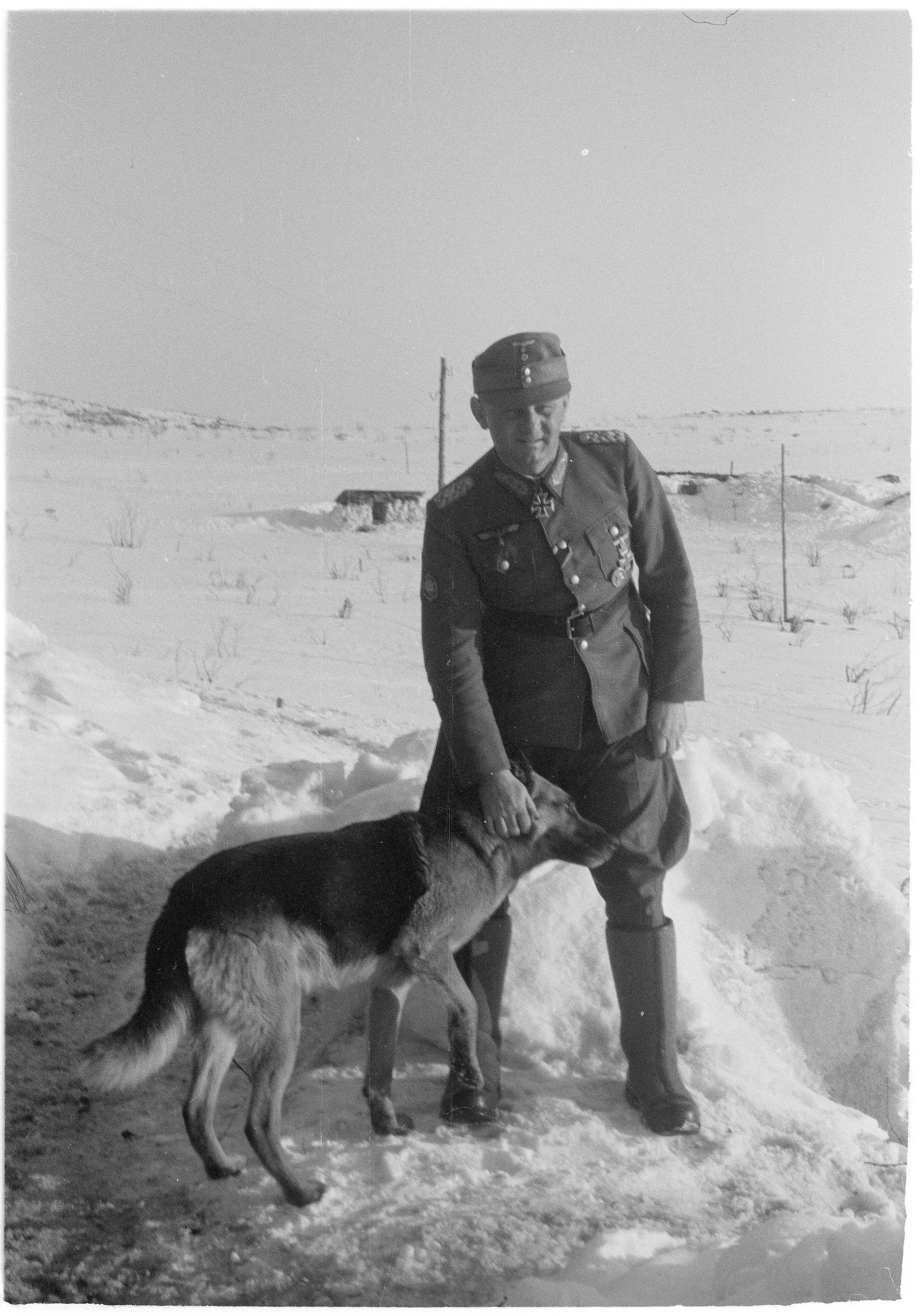
- Hengel at Petsamo
- Born: 21 October 1897; Lailing, Kingdom of Bavaria, German Empire
- Died: 19 March 1952 (aged 54); Sonthofen, Bavaria, West Germany
- Military career
- Allegiance: German Empire; Weimar Republic; Nazi Germany
- Branch: German Army
- Service years: 1914–1921; 1934–1945
- Rank: General der Gebirgstruppe
- Commands: 2nd Mountain Division; Mountain Corps Norway
- Conflicts: World War I; World War II; Anschluss; Invasion of Poland; Operation Weserübung; Operation Barbarossa; Operation Silberfuchs; Operation Platinfuchs
- Awards: Knight's Cross of the Iron Cross
- Other work: Police Officer

Georg Ritter von Hengl (21 October 1897 – 19 March 1952) was a general in the Wehrmacht of Nazi Germany during World War II who commanded the XIX Mountain Corps. He was a recipient of the Knight's Cross of the Iron Cross.

During World War I, he had served in the Luftstreitkrafte and shot down a total of 7 aircraft between July and October 1918. From 1921 to 1934, he also served in the German police, reaching the rank of Hauptmann. Georg Ritter von Hengl was captured by Allied troops in May 1945 and was released in 1947.

== Life and career ==
=== World War I ===
Hengl joined the German Army as an ensign in 1914, aged 16, serving initially in the 21st Bavarian Reserve Infantry Regiment near Ypres in 1914. The following year saw him transferred to the Eastern Front to serve in Russia. In October 1915, he was transferred south to the Serbian sector. He transferred back to France in 1916, to serve near Verdun; on 23 March he was promoted into the officer's ranks as a Leutnant. He then returned to duties in Russia. After requesting a transfer to aviation duty, he started aerial observer's training on 23 February 1918. Upon graduation, he was posted to the Kingdom of Bavaria's FA(A) 295. His usual pilot in the two-seater reconnaissance aircraft was Johann Baur. The duo were credited with six confirmed aerial victories together, beginning with a double victory over SPADs on 17 July 1918 over Courton Wood. The aircrew of Hengl and Baur were shot down behind British lines during the Third Battle of the Aisne; however, they were rescued from captivity by troopers from Württemberg. The pair would score another four victories in October 1918, with Hengl scoring a seventh while part of the crew for another pilot.

Georg Hengl emerged from World War I having been awarded both classes of the Iron Cross and the Royal House Order of Hohenzollern. His native Kingdom of Bavaria also bestowed the Military Order of Max Joseph upon him; one of the entitlements of this decoration was an award of lifetime nobility for him, signified by the addition of the phrase "Ritter von" to one's name. Georg Hengl thus became George Ritter von Hengl.

=== Inter-war and World War II ===
In 1919, Hengl left the army and entered the police. Recalled for military service, in 1936, he was given command of a battalion of the 99th Gebirgsjager Regiment, leading this unit in the first campaigns of World War II.

For much of the war, Hengl was stationed on the Arctic front against the Soviet Union. Initially he commanded the 137th Gebirgsjager Regiment, receiving the Knight's Cross of the Iron Cross in August 1941. From March 1942 to October 1943 he commanded the 2nd Mountain Division, and then the XIX Mountain Corps until April 1944. In February 1945 he was designated to take over command of LIX Army Corps on the Eastern Front, but he did not take up the post.

Hengl ended the war with the rank of General of Mountain Troops (German: General der Gebirgstruppe).

== Awards and decorations ==
- Knight's Cross of the Iron Cross on 25 August 1941 as Oberstleutnant (lieutenant colonel) and commander of Gebirgsjäger-Regiment 137.

Military offices
Preceded by Generalleutnant Ernst Schlemmer	Commander of 2. Gebirgs--Division; 2 March 1942 – 23 October 1943	Succeeded by Generalleutnant Hans Degen
Preceded by General der Gebirgstruppe Ferdinand Schörner	Commander of XIX. Gebirgs-Armeekorps; 23 October 1943 – 21 April 1944	Succeeded by General der Gebirgstruppe Ferdinand Jodl
