= Operation Renntier =

WW2 battle in Finland

- Part of Operation Silver Fox of the Eastern Front
Date	22 June 1941
Location	Petsamo, Finland 64°N 26°E
Result	German victory

Belligerents
Germany	Soviet Union

Units involved
2nd Mountain Division; 3rd Mountain Division	

Strength
27,500	

Operation Renntier (Note: Sometimes referred to as "Operation Reindeer", due to the similarity of the name to the German word Rentier, (meaning "Reindeer") However, numerous sources, including German ones, are clear the spelling Renntier is correct.) was a German operation during World War II intended to secure the nickel mines around Petsamo in Finland, against a Soviet attack in the event of a renewed war between Finland and the Soviet Union.

The planning for the operation started on 13 August 1940, after the German occupation of Norway was complete and was finalized in October that year. The plan called for the two divisions of the Gebirgskorps Norwegen to occupy Petsamo and prevent Soviet capture of the mines.

The operation was carried out by the Wehrmacht as part of Operation Barbarossa, the German attack on the Soviet Union and began on 22 June 1941. The 2nd Mountain Division occupied the area around Liinakhamari and the 3rd Mountain Division occupied Luostari. The operation was followed up by Operation Platinum Fox, which was an attack by the two divisions against Murmansk as a part of the larger Operation Silver Fox.

== Sources ==
- Franz Halder, Hans Adolf Jacobsen (1962) Kriegstagebuch: Von der geplanten Landung in England bis zum Beginn des Ostfeldzuges (1.7.40-21.6.41) p.468 (... ( Unternehmen Renntier ) . bb ) den Stützpunkt Murmansk , als Basis für eine offensive Tätigkeit seiner Land- , See- u . Luftstreitkräfte , nach Kräften einzuengen und im weiteren Verlauf , wenn genügend Angriffskräfte zur Verfügung ...: "(Operation Renntier) . bb) to constrict the Murmansk base, as a base for offensive activity by its land, sea and air forces, as far as possible and, if sufficient offensive forces are available, to further...")
- Erhard Moritz (1970) Fall Barbarossa Dokumente zur Vorbereitung der faschistischen Wehrmacht auf die Aggression gegen Sowjetunion 1940/41 p.172 (... Unternehmen Renntier und Silber- fuchs einzusetzen , die zuerst den Aufmarsch der deutschen Kräfte decken und sich später an der Angriffsoperation beteiligen . Es ist erwünscht , Hangö möglichst frühzeitig zu nehmen . Wenn das ohne ... : "...to deploy Operations Renntier and Silberfuchs, which would first cover the deployment of German forces and later participate in the offensive operation. It is desirable to capture Hangö as early as possible. If that is not possible without..."
- Mann, Chris M.; Jörgensen, Christer (2002). Hitler's Arctic War. Hersham: Ian Allan. ISBN 0-7110-2899-0.
