= Eduard Dietl =

German Wehrmacht Heer general (1890–1944)

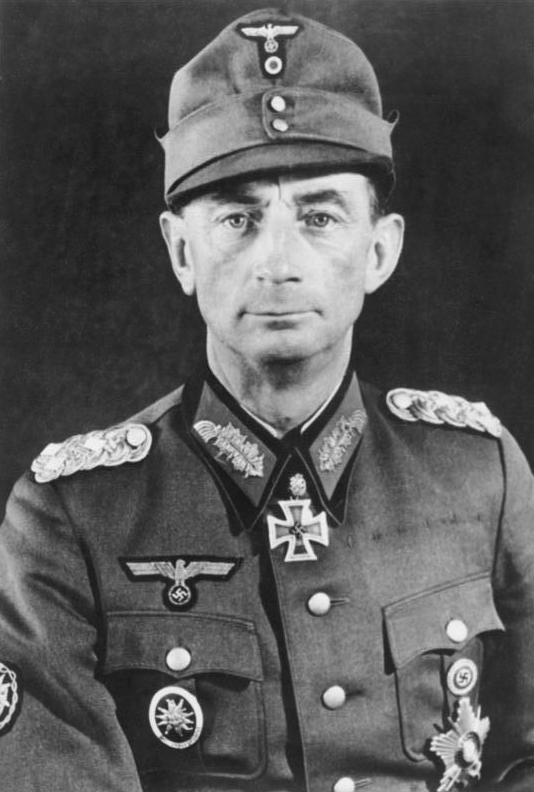
- Dietl in 1943
- Born: 21 July 1890; Bad Aibling, Kingdom of Bavaria, German Empire
- Died: 23 June 1944 (aged 53) near Rettenegg, Reichsgau Steiermark, Nazi Germany
- Burial place: Nordfriedhof (Munich)
- Military career
- Allegiance: German Empire; Weimar Republic; Nazi Germany
- Service years: 1910–1944
- Rank: Generaloberst
- Nickname: "The hero of Narvik"
- Commands: 3rd Mountain Division; 20th Mountain Army
- Conflicts: World War I; World War II; Invasion of Norway; Operation Silver Fox
- Awards: Knight's Cross of the Iron Cross with Oak Leaves and Swords

Eduard Wohlrat Christian Dietl (21 July 1890 – 23 June 1944) was a German Heer general in the Wehrmacht of Nazi Germany during World War II who commanded the 20th Mountain Army. He received the Knight's Cross of the Iron Cross with Oak Leaves and Swords.

== Military career ==
Born in 1890, Dietl joined the army on 1 October 1909 as a Fahnenjunker in the 5th Infantry Regiment "Grand Duke Ernst Ludwig of Hesse" of the Bavarian Army in Bamberg. In World War I, he was deployed on the Western Front and he was wounded in October 1914 and October 1918. During the Weimar Republic, he joined the German Workers' Party (DAP), the precursor to the National Socialist German Workers' Party (NSDAP; Nazi Party), and the paramilitary group Freikorps of Franz Ritter von Epp in 1919. Dietl continued to serve in the German Army and, as a Generalmajor, he helped organise the 1936 Winter Olympics held at Garmisch-Partenkirchen.

Dietl commanded the German 3rd Mountain Division that participated in the German invasion of Norway on 9 and 10 April 1940. Most of this division was landed at Narvik by a German naval force of ten destroyers, commanded by Commodore Friedrich Bonte, subsequently all ten destroyers that had ferried Dietl's troops to Narvik were sunk in the First and Second Battles of Narvik. Dietl's mountaineers withdrew into the hills and later retook the town when Britain abandoned her efforts to evict the Germans from Norway due to German success on the Western Front (the Franco-German border, Luxembourg, Belgium and the Netherlands). Outnumbered by Norwegian, British, French and Polish forces, his skilful defence utilized ammunition, food and sailors (re-drafted as infantrymen) from the sunken ships. This gained him the nickname "The hero of Narvik".

Dietl subsequently commanded German forces in Norway and northern Finland and in Eastern Europe and rose to the rank of Generaloberst, commanding the 20th Mountain Army on the northern Eastern Front, where the results of the German Arctic campaign were disappointing. Dietl initially turned down his promotion, but was convinced to accept the appointment by Generaloberst Alfred Jodl. Soviet troops presented challenges for his command.

=== Death ===
On 23 June 1944, the Ju 52 aircraft carrying Dietl, General der Infanterie Thomas-Emil von Wickede, General der Gebirgstruppe Karl Eglseer, Generalleutnant Franz Rossi and three other passengers crashed in the vicinity of the small village of Rettenegg, Styria. There were no survivors. Hitler eulogized him at Dietl's state funeral.

Until 1997, the municipality of Ringelai in the Bavarian Forest honoured Dietl with a memorial plaque. In 1997, the site changed into one honoring World War I veteran Albert Leo Schlageter instead. The Bavarian town Freyung honoured Dietl by naming a street General-Dietl-Straße (renamed Jan. 1998).

=== Assessment ===
Dietl was sent to Finland designated to be the "hero in the snow" (to be a counterpart to Rommel who would be the "hero in the sun", also given a secondary theatre leaving the main stage to Hitler). A convinced National Socialist and one of Hitler's favourite generals, he was the first German soldier to be awarded the oak leaves cluster to the Knight's Cross of the Iron Cross - on 19 June 1940. Dietl was also popular among his men and his Finnish allies.

Historian Klaus Schmider remarks that Dietl had too much political baggage to compensate for his admirable record as a mountain troops leader. As a young officer, he refused to assist the civil government in crushing Hitler's abortive Beer Hall Putsch in 1923. He was also a founding member of the Nazi Party. What has led the Bundeswehr and the German federal government to reverse honours towards Dietl, though, is his recently discovered view on marriages between Scandinavian women and his soldiers, which was "extreme even by the standards of the Third Reich": after Dietl circulated an order that called Norwegian and Finnish women "racial flotsam", Himmler himself had to intervene to rescind it.

Dietl was involved in numerous war crimes. The first was the passing of the Commissar Order. Dietl was responsible for troops who employed the use of slave labourers in Wehrmacht penal camps in Finland and Norway. The camps employed extermination through work. The so-called probation program included the walk from Rovaniemi to Petsamo on the Arctic Ocean, in which tired penal soldiers were killed with shots in the neck. From the summer of 1942 onwards, there were arbitrary shootings and sadistic abuse of German penal soldiers by Wehrmacht guards in Finland and northern Norway. In a speech on 16 June 1942, Dietl himself threatened to murder the penal soldiers if they did not take part in the marches.

== Awards ==
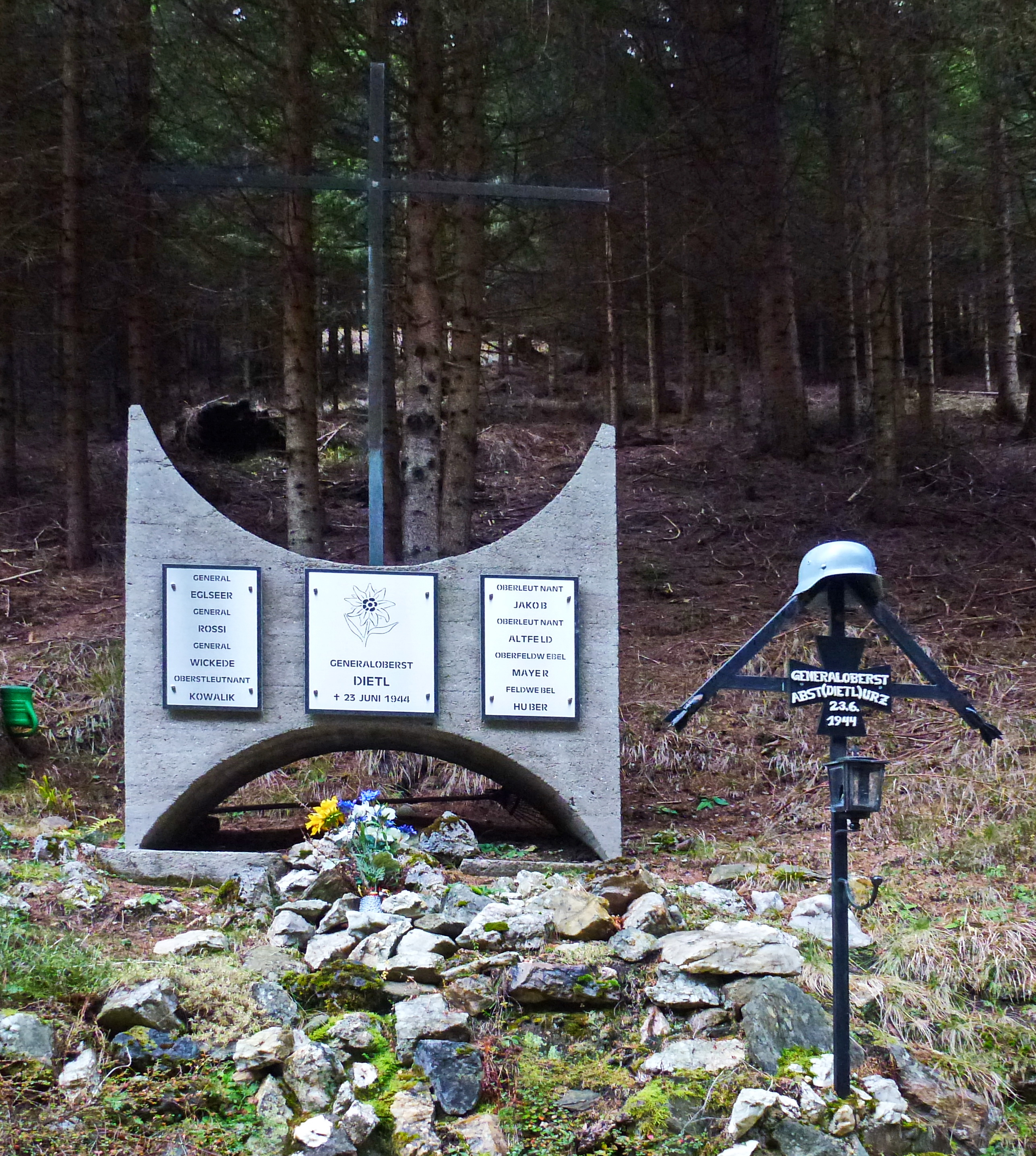
Dietl memorial at crash site

- Prince Regent Luitpold Medal (Bavaria; 12 March 1911)
- Iron Cross (1914) 2nd class (16 September 1914) & 1st class (3 September 1916)
- General Honour Decoration (Hesse) (16 October 1915)
- Wound Badge (1914) in Silver (1917)
- Bavarian Military Order of Merit 4th class with Swords (18 June 1918) & Commanders Cross (17 August 1933)
- Honour Cross of the World War 1914/1918 (18 January 1935)
- Wehrmacht Long Service Award, 4th class with 1st class (2 October 1936)
- Olympic Games Decoration, 1st class (1936)
- Clasp to the Iron Cross (1939) 2nd class (24 September 1939) & 1st class (15 April 1940)
- Destroyer War Badge (5 November 1940)
- Narvik Shield (21 March 1941)
- Knight's Cross of the Iron Cross with Oak Leaves and Swords
  - Knight's Cross as Generalleutnant and commander of the 3. Gebirgs-Division (9 May 1940)
  - 1st Oak Leaves as Generalleutnant and commanding general of the Gebirgs-Korps Norwegen (19 July 1940)
  - Swords as Generaloberst and commander in chief of the 20. Gebirgs-Armee (1 July 1944, posthumously)
- Pilot/Observer Badge in Gold with Diamonds(5 January 1941)
- Order of Merit, Commander's Cross with carry permit (Chile; 16 March 1934)
- Order of the White Rose of Finland, Grand Cross with Breast Star and Swords (Finland; 9 November 1941)
- Order of the Cross of Liberty 1st class with Star, Oak leaves and Swords (20 January 1944) & Grand Cross (Finland; 28 June 1944)

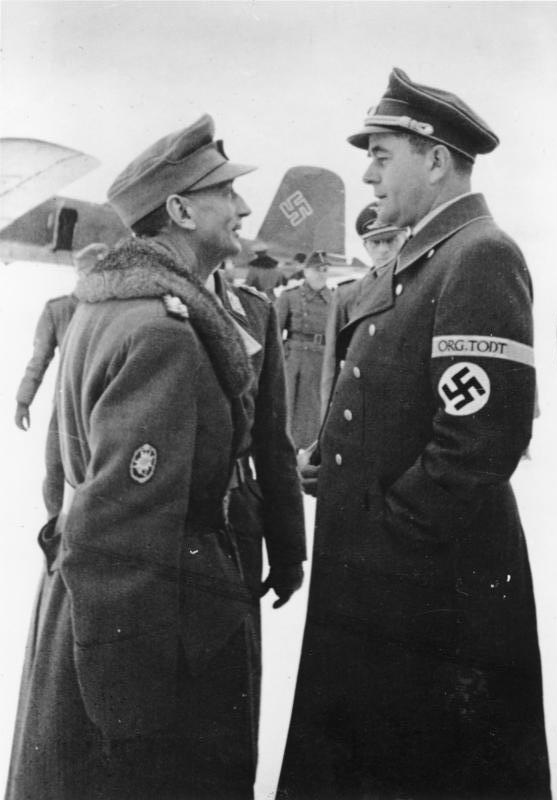
Speer (wearing Organisation Todt armband) and Wehrmacht general Eduard Dietl at Rovaniemi Airport in Finland, December 1943

Military offices
Preceded by none	Commander of 3. Gebirgs-Division; 1 May 1938 – 14 June 1940	Succeeded by General der Gebirgstruppen Julius Ringel
Preceded by none	Commander of Gebirgs-Armeekorps Norwegen; 14 June 1940 – 15 January 1942	Succeeded by Generalfeldmarschall Ferdinand Schörner
Preceded by Generaloberst Nikolaus von Falkenhorst	Commander of Armee Lappland; 15 January 1942 – 20 June 1942	Succeeded by redesignated as 20. Gebirgs-Armee
Preceded by none	Commander of 20. Gebirgs-Armee; 20 June 1942 – 23 June 1944	Succeeded by Generaloberst Dr. Lothar Rendulic
