= Valentin Feurstein =

Austrian military officer

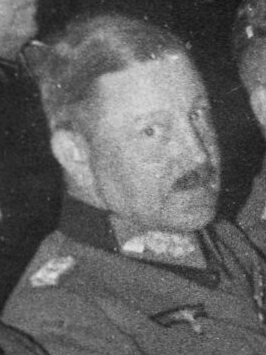
- Born: 18 January 1885; Bregenz, Austria-Hungary
- Died: 8 June 1970 (aged 85); Innsbruck, Republic of Austria
- Relatives: ∞ 1919 Eva Römer; 3 children
- Military career
- Allegiance: Austria–Hungary; Republic of German-Austria; First Austrian Republic; Nazi Germany
- Branch: Austro-Hungarian Army; German-Austrian People's Militia; Bundesheer; Army (Wehrmacht)
- Service years: 1906–1945
- Rank: General der Gebirgstruppe
- Commands: 2nd Mountain Division; LI Mountain Corps
- Conflicts: World War I World War II
- Awards: Knight's Cross of the Iron Cross

Valentin Feurstein (1 January 1885 – 8 June 1970) was an Austrian military officer who served in the Austrian and German armies.

== Life ==
Coming from the Theresian Military Academy in Wiener-Neustadt, Feurstein was transferred to the Austro-Hungarian Army (2. Tiroler Kaiserjäger-Regiment) on 18 August 1906 as a commissioned officer.

He served in World War I and in the Austrian Bundesheer in the 1930s. He was commander of 3rd Division (stationed in St. Pölten). After the Anschluss and the incorporation of the Bundesheer into it, Feurstein served as a general in the Wehrmacht.

He commanded the 2nd Mountain Division during Fall Weiss and during the Norwegian Campaign. In 1941, he was promoted to full general of mountain troops (Gen.d.Geb.Tr.). He also served on the Italian front in 1943.

Feurstein was city commander of Bregenz in 1945 and tried to declare Bregenz a non-combat zone.

== Death ==
General (Ret.) Valentin Feurstein died on 8 June 1970.

== Promotions ==
- 18 August 1906 Leutnant (2nd Lieutenant)
- 1 November 1911 Oberleutnant (1st Lieutenant)
  - 20 December 1913 Oberleutnant i. G. (1st Lieutenant in General Staff)
- 1 May 1915 Hauptmann i. G. (Captain in General Staff)
- 1 July 1920 Major
- 1 January 1921 Titular-Oberstleutnant (Brevet Lieutenant Colonel)
- 1 September 1924 Oberstleutnant (active Lieutenant Colonel)
- 30 September 1928 Oberst (Colonel)
  - post-Anschluss, received Wehrmacht Rank Seniority (RDA) from 1 August 1935
- 25 June 1935 Generalmajor (Major General)

=== Wehrmacht ===
- 14 March 1938 Generalmajor (Major General) with effect from 13 March 1938 but without RDA
  - 31 March 1939 received Rank Seniority (RDA) from 1 April 1939 (13)
- 31 May 1939 Generalleutnant (Lieutenant General) with effect and RDA from 1 June 1939 (5)
- 14 August 1941 General der Gebirgstruppe with effect and RDA from 1 September 1941 (1)

== Awards and decorations ==
- Military Jubilee Cross for the armed forces
- Austro-Hungarian Military Merit Medal (Signum Laudis) in Bronze on the ribbon of the Military Merit Cross (ribbon for wartime merit) in 1914
  - When the "swords" were introduced on 13 December 1916, he was subsequently awarded this distinction.
- Military Merit Order (Bavaria), 4th Class with Swords (BMV4bX/BM4X) in 1915
- Military Merit Cross (Austria-Hungary), III. Class with War Decoration (ÖM3K) in 1915
  - When the "swords" were introduced to the war decoration on 13 December 1916, he was subsequently awarded this distinction (ÖM3KX).
- Military Merit Order (Bavaria), 4th Class with Crown and Swords (BMV4aX/BM4XmKr) in 1916
- Austro-Hungarian Military Merit Medal (Signum Laudis) in Silver with Swords on the ribbon of the Military Merit Cross (ribbon for wartime merit) in 1917
- Order of the Iron Crown (Austria), Knight III. Class with War Decoration and Swords (ÖEK3KX) on 8 May 1918
- Austrian War Commemorative Medal with Swords on 26 June 1933
- Military Service Badge (Austria) for Officers, 2nd Class (for 25 years) on 1 October 1934
- Austrian Order of Merit, Officer's Cross on 25 November 1936
- Wehrmacht Long Service Award, 4th to 1st Class (25-year Service Cross)
- Honour Cross of the World War 1914/1918 with Swords
- Sudetenland Medal with the “Prague Castle” clasp on 10 August 1939
- Iron Cross (1939), 2nd and 1st Class
  - 2nd Class on 5 September 1939
  - 1st Class on 9 October 1939
- Mentioned by name in the Wehrmachtbericht on 23 May 1944
- Knight's Cross of the Iron Cross on 12 August 1944

=== Honours ===
- 1970: General-Feurstein-Straße in Innsbruck

== Sources ==
- German Federal Archives: BArch PERS 6/138 and PERS 6/299636

Military offices
Preceded by none	Commander of 2. Gebirgs-Division; 1 March 1938 – 4 March 1941	Succeeded by Generalleutnant Ernst Schlemmer
Preceded by none	Commander of Höheres Kommando z.b.V. LXX; Commander of LXX. Armeekorps; 4 May 1941 - 22 June 1943	Succeeded by General der Artillerie Hermann Tittel
Preceded by none	Commander of LI. Gebirgs-Armeekorps; 25 August 1943 - January 1945	Succeeded by General der Gebirgstruppe Friedrich-Wilhelm Hauck
