= Hans Degen =

German general (1899–1971)

- Born: 18 February 1899; Rosenheim, German Empire
- Died: 8 November 1971 (aged 72); Bad Tölz, West Germany
- Military career
- Allegiance: Nazi Germany
- Branch: Army (Wehrmacht)
- Rank: Generalleutnant
- Commands: 2nd Mountain Division
- Conflicts: World War II
- Awards: Knight's Cross of the Iron Cross

Hans Degen (18 February 1899 – 8 November 1971) was a general in the Wehrmacht of Nazi Germany. He was a recipient of the Knight's Cross of the Iron Cross.

== Life and career ==
Hans Degen was born in Rosenheim in Upper Bavaria in 1899. He entered the German Army in September 1916 as an ensign, serving in a Jäger battalion until the end of World War I. He remained in the army after 1918, becoming a general staff officer. In this capacity he served with 2nd Mountain Division in 1938, moving to the 1st Mountain Division on the outbreak of war in September 1939. He was then appointed chief of staff of VI Army Corps and then XIX Army Corps.

In November 1943 he took command of the 2nd Mountain Division. This served on the Arctic and Western fronts, where Degen was badly wounded, retiring from the division in February 1945. In March 1945 he was awarded the Knight's Cross of the Iron Cross for his command of the division.

Degen ended the war with the rank of Generalleutnant.

== Awards and decorations ==
- German Cross in Gold
- Knight's Cross of the Iron Cross on 11 March 1945 as Generalleutnant and commander of 2. Gebirgs-Division.

== Notes ==
Military offices
Preceded by Generalleutnant Georg Ritter von Hengl	Commander of 2. Gebirgs-Division; 1 November 1943 – 6 February 1945	Succeeded by Oberst Hans Roschmann
