= Mountain Corps Norway =

- Generalkommando Gebirgskorps Norwegen
- Active: 1 July 1940 – 10 November 1942
- Disbanded: 10 November 1942
- Country: Nazi Germany

Commanders
- Notable commanders: Eduard Dietl

Mountain Corps Norway (German: Gebirgskorps Norwegen) was a German army unit during World War II. It saw action in Norway and Finland.

The corps was formed in July 1940 and was later transferred to Northern Norway as part of Armeeoberkommando Norwegen ("army high command Norway"). Its first action was taking part in Operation Renntier ("reindeer"), the occupation of Finnish Petsamo to protect the nickel mines there from USSR. In June 1941 the corps attacked from Petsamo to Murmansk in Operation Platinum Fox (German: Unternehmen Platinfuchs). The attack failed and the corps never reached its goal.

In April and May 1942 the corps faced one of its toughest challenges. Over a period of three weeks, the Soviet 14th Army attacked, trying to defeat the Corps. But there was another enemy - on 4 May 1942, a devastating, 90-hour-long polar storm took its toll on the soldiers.

In November 1942 the corps was renamed the XIX. Gebirgs-Armeekorps or XIX Mountain Corps.

In 1944 the corps finally had to retreat back to Norway, where it surrendered in May 1945. From November 1944 onwards the corps was also sometimes known as Armeeabteilung Narvik.

== Commanders ==
- Generaloberst Eduard Dietl (14 June 1940 - 15 January 1942)
- Generalfeldmarschall Ferdinand Schörner (15 January 1942 - 1 October 1943)
- General der Gebirgstruppe Georg Ritter von Hengl (1 October 1943 - 15 May 1944)
- General der Gebirgstruppe Ferdinand Jodl (15 May 1944 - 8 May 1945)

== Area of operations ==
Date	Area	Subordinate to	Operations
1 July 1940 - 19 December 1940	Norway	Army Group XXI	Operation Weserübung
19 December 1940 - 14 January 1942	Finland	Army Norway	Operation Platinfuchs
14 January 1942 - 22 June 1942	Finland	Army Lappland	-
22 June 1942 - 24 April 1945	Finland, Norway	20th Mountain Army	Operation Nordlicht

== Organisation ==
- 2nd Mountain Division (Gebirgsjäger light infantry)
- 3rd Mountain Division (until September 1941)
- 6th Mountain Division
- 210th Coastal Defense Division (a mixture of fortress infantry and coastal artillery units, 1943 - October 1944)
- Division Rossi
- Er.Os. P (Finnish Separate Detachment P)
- Finnish 14th Regiment (2 battalions)

== Strength based on supply documents ==
On 30 April 1942 the supply numbers for the Mountain Corps Norway showed the following numbers: 73,978 men and 8,913 horses

Of the men:

- 48,576 were Heer (Army)
- 8,744 were Luftwaffe (Air Force)
- 6,942 were Kriegsmarine (Navy)
- 2,380 were Reichsarbeitsdienst (labor service)
- 975 were Organisation Todt
- Plus some Finns (border security, road maintenance), Norwegian and Dutch workers, Nationalsozialistisch Kraftfahrkorps (Speer) and 2,335 prisoners of war.

== Bibliography ==
- James R. Smither, Review of "Arctic Front: The Advance of Mountain Corps Norway on Murmansk, 1941 By Wilhelm Hess," Michigan War Studies Review, accessed at http://www.miwsr.com/2021-101.aspx, 3 December 2021. Translation of 1956 German work. Smither comments that "[w]hile this translation of Hess's work is a welcome addition to the Anglophone literature on Barbarossa, it has its limitations. [Hess] scrupulously avoids discussing Nazi ideology and policies, and skirts around issues relating to the mistreatment of civilians, especially in Norway, where he acknowledges the presence of a resistance movement. He concentrates on narrowly military issues or matters relating to German cooperation with the Finns."
- Tessin, Georg (1980). Die Landstreitkräfte: Namensverbände / Die Luftstreitkräfte (Fliegende Verbände) / Flakeinsatz im Reich 1943–1945 [Ground forces: Named units and formations / Air forces (Flying units and formations) / Anti–aircraft service in the Reich 1943–1945] (in German). Vol. 14. Osnabrück: Biblio. ISBN 3-7648-1111-0.
- Ziemke, Earl F. (1959). The German Northern Theater of Operations 1940-1945. Vol. Department of the Army Pamphlet No. 20-271. United States. Department of the Army.
