= General der Gebirgstruppe =

WW2 German Army branch general rank

General of the Mountain Troops General der Gebirgstruppe
- Arabesque and flecktarn suit insignia

- Army shoulder board
- Country: Nazi Germany
- Service branch: German Army
- Rank: Three-star
- NATO rank code: OF-8
- Non-NATO rank: O-9
- Formation: 1940
- Abolished: 1945
- Next higher rank: Generaloberst
- Next lower rank: Generalleutnant
- Equivalent ranks: See list

General der Gebirgstruppe (English: General of the Mountain Troops) was a category of three-star rank in the German Army, a new example of the traditional German 'General der rank introduced by the Wehrmacht in 1940, comparable to the NATO grade OF-8.

== Rank and rank insignia ==
The rank was equivalent to the long established General der Kavallerie (cavalry), General der Artillerie (artillery), and General der Infanterie (infantry). The Wehrmacht also introduced General der Panzertruppe (armoured troops), General der Pioniere (engineers), General der Fallschirmtruppe (parachute troops) and General der Nachrichtentruppe (communications troops).

Mountain Infantry (Gebirgsjäger) Generals were identifiable by their edelweiss sleeve and cap insignia and the mountain cap (bergmütze) worn instead of the peaked cap of officers from other branches of the Wehrmacht. In October 1942 an order was issued that general officers should have gold piping around the crown of the cap to distinguish them more readily from other ranks.

junior rank: Generalleutnant	(German officer rank); General der Gebirgstruppe	senior rank: Generaloberst

== List of officers who were General der Gebirgstruppe ==
- Franz Böhme (1885–1947) (committed suicide)
- Eduard Dietl (1889–1944) (Promoted Generaloberst 1/6/1942, killed in plane crash 23/6/1944)
- Karl Eglseer (1890–1944) (killed in plane crash 23/6/1944)
- Valentin Feurstein (1885–1970)
- Georg Ritter von Hengl (1897–1952)
- Ferdinand Jodl (1896–1956)
- Rudolf Konrad (1891–1964)
- Hans Kreysing (1890–1969)
- Ludwig Kübler (1889–1947) (executed in Yugoslavia)
- Hubert Lanz (1896–1982)
- Julius Ringel (1889–1967)
- Ferdinand Schörner (1892–1973) (Promoted Generaloberst 1/4/1944, Generalfeldmarschall 4/4/1945)
- Hans Schlemmer (1893–1973)
- Hans Karl Maximilian von Le Suire (1898–1954)
- Kurt Versock (1895–1963)
- Emil Vogel (1894–1985)
- Friedrich-Jobst Volckamer von Kirchensittenbach (1894–1989)
- August Winter (1897–1979)

== See also ==
- General of the branch
- World War II German Army ranks and insignia
