= Rettenegg =

- Municipality
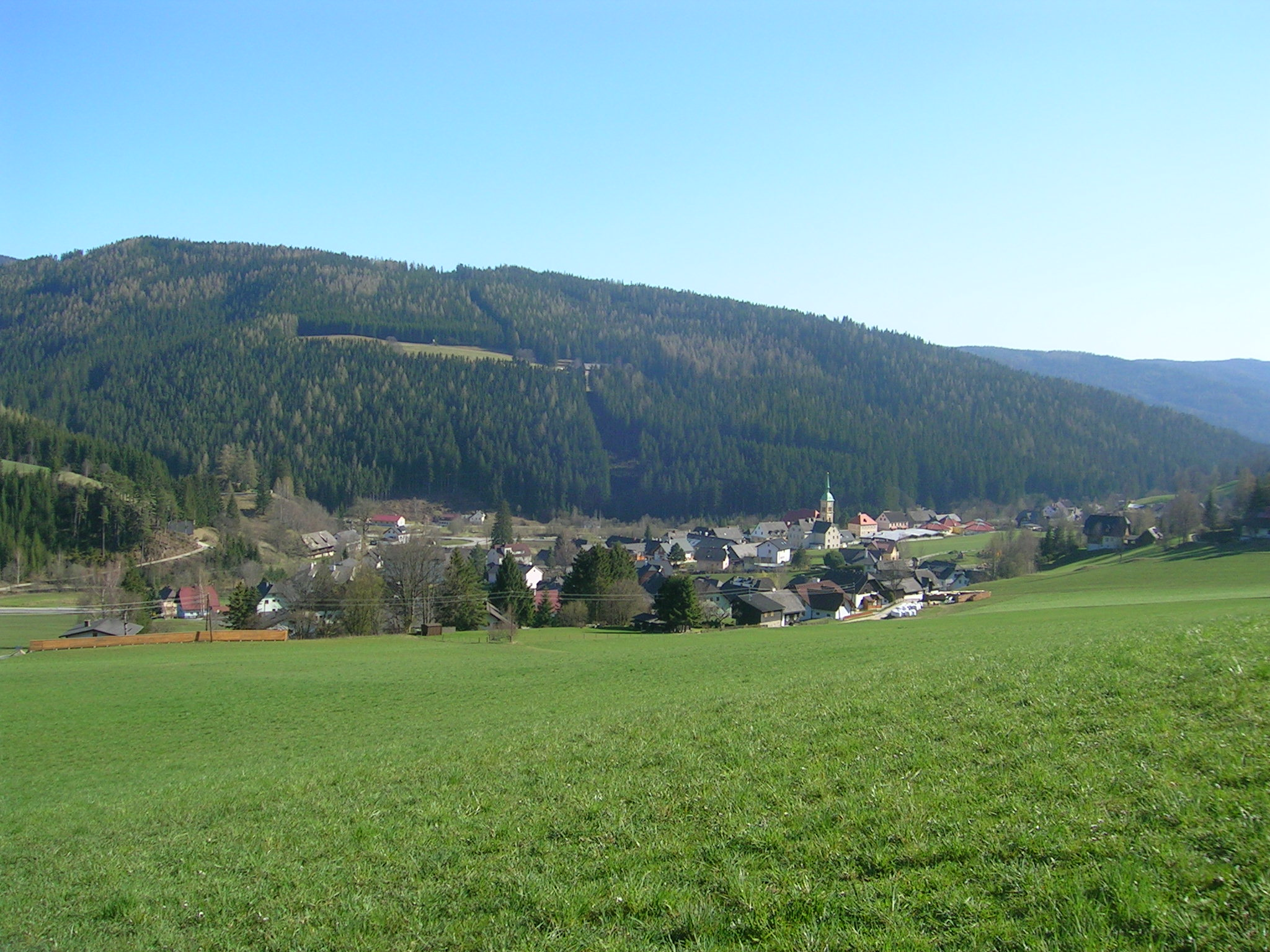
- View of Rettenegg

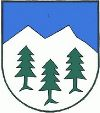
- Coat of arms

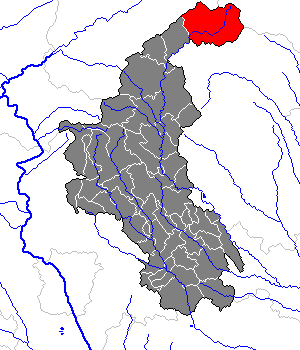
- Location within Weiz district

- Location within Austria
- Coordinates: 47°31′33″N 15°46′49″E
- Country: Austria
- State: Styria
- District: Weiz

Government
  - Mayor: Johann Ziegerhofer (ÖVP)

Area
  - Total: 78.87 km^{2} (30.45 sq mi)
- Elevation: 862 m (2,828 ft)

Population (2018-01-01)
  - Total: 741
  - Density: 9.40/km^{2} (24.3/sq mi)
- Time zone: UTC+1 (CET)
  - Summer (DST): UTC+2 (CEST)
- Postal code: 8674
- Area code: 03173
- Vehicle registration: WZ
- Website: www.rettenegg.at

Rettenegg is a municipality in the district of Weiz in the Austrian state of Styria.

== Geography ==
Rettenegg lies in the Fischbach Alps at the confluence of the Pfaffenbach and the Feistritz.
