= Ferdinand Schörner =

German field marshal (1892–1973)

- Schörner c. 1941–1944

Commander-in-Chief of the German Army
- In office 30 April 1945 – 8 May 1945
- Preceded by: Adolf Hitler
- Succeeded by: Office abolished

Personal details
- Born: 12 June 1892 Munich, Kingdom of Bavaria, German Empire
- Died: 2 July 1973 (aged 81) Munich, Bavaria, West Germany
- Party: Nazi Party
- Civilian awards: Golden Party Badge of the NSDAP
- Nickname(s): Blutiger Ferdinand (Bloody Ferdinand); Ungeheuer in Uniform (Monster in uniform)

Military service
- Allegiance: Kingdom of Bavaria; German Empire; Weimar Republic; Nazi Germany
- Branch/service: Bavarian Army; Imperial German Army; Freikorps; Reichsheer; German Army
- Years of service: 1911–1945
- Rank: Generalfeldmarschall
- Commands: Army Group South Ukraine; Army Group North; Army Group Centre
- Battles/wars: See battles: World War I; Battle of Caporetto; World War II; Invasion of Poland; Battle of Lwów; Battle of Greece; Battle of Metaxas Line; Battle of Tempe Gorge; Battle of Thermopylae; Battle of Crete; Dnieper-Carpathian Offensive; Nikopol-Krivoi Rog Offensive; Operation Bagration; Lublin-Brest Offensive; Battle of Romania; Second Battle of Târgu Frumos; Baltic Offensive; Riga Offensive; Tallinn Offensive; Moonsund Landing Operation; Courland Pocket; Vistula-Oder Offensive; Lower Silesian Offensive; Upper Silesian Offensive; Battle of Berlin; Battle of Bautzen; Prague Offensive
- Military awards: Pour le Mérite; Knight's Cross of the Iron Cross with Oak Leaves, Swords and Diamonds

Johann Ferdinand Schörner (12 June 1892 – 2 July 1973) was a German military commander and convicted war criminal, who held the rank of Generalfeldmarschall (Field Marshal) in the Wehrmacht of Nazi Germany during World War II. He was the only German soldier to rise to this rank from his initial status of Einjährig-Freiwilliger (One-year volunteer). He commanded several army groups and was the final Commander-in-chief of the German Army and the last man promoted to the rank of Field Marshal in the Wehrmacht.

Schörner was a dedicated Nazi and became well known for his ruthlessness. By the end of World War II, he was Hitler's favourite commander. He also became notorious amongst German soldiers for his harshness against "deserters". Following the war he was convicted of war crimes by courts in the Soviet Union and West Germany, and was imprisoned in the Soviet Union, East Germany and West Germany.

== Early life ==
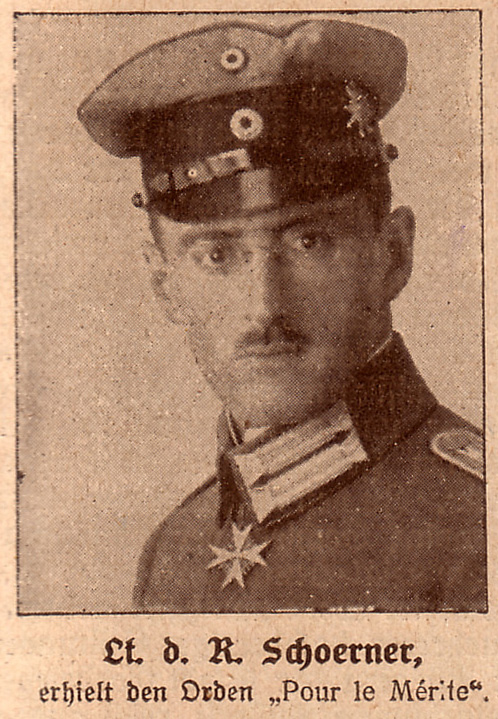
Lieutenant Schörner with the Pour le Mérite

Schörner was born on 12 June 1892 in Munich, Kingdom of Bavaria, German Empire. He entered the Bavarian Army in October 1911 as a one-year volunteer with the Bavarian Leib Regiment, and by November 1914 he was a Leutnant der Reserve. Serving in World War I, he was awarded the Pour le Mérite military order as a lieutenant when he took part in the Battle of Caporetto, which shattered the Italian lines in autumn 1917. The decoration was accompanied by some controversy as Erwin Rommel officially protested the award of the Pour le Merit to Schörner. (Note: Rommel claimed that the credit for the capture of Hill 1114 was due him and not Schörner. After the war Rommel persuaded the Reich government to print a fourteen-page supplement which in part set out his own role in more vivid detail. He also asked the official army historian to make corrections to the record. This dispute created a lifelong rivalry between the two officers.) Continuing in the Reichswehr, between the two wars, Schörner served as a staff officer and instructor. In 1923 he was adjutant to General Otto von Lossow, the commander of Wehrkreis VII (military district) in Munich and participated in the defeat of the Beer Hall Putsch.

== World War II ==
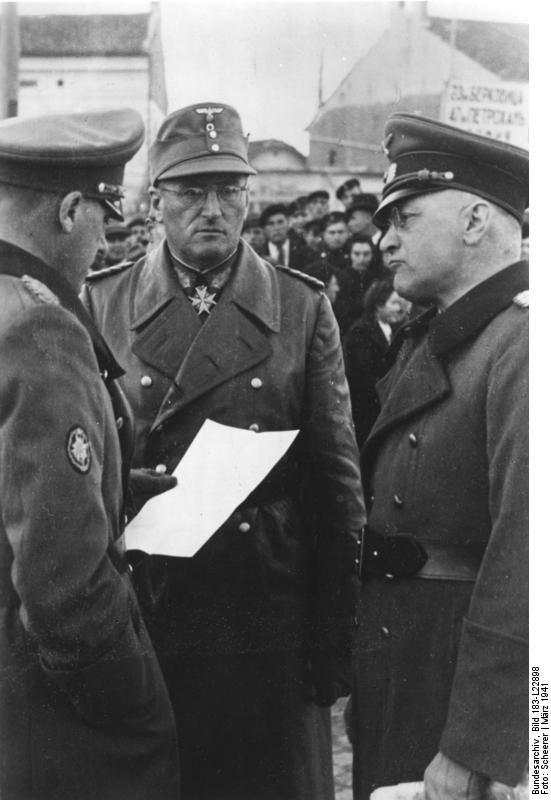
Schörner (center) in Bulgaria, 1941

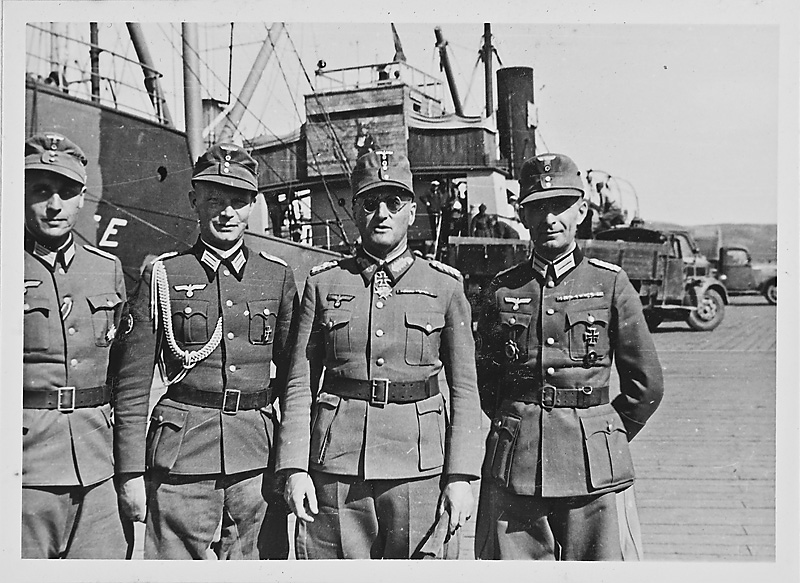
Schörner journeys to Northern Norway and Finland, 10–27 July 1942

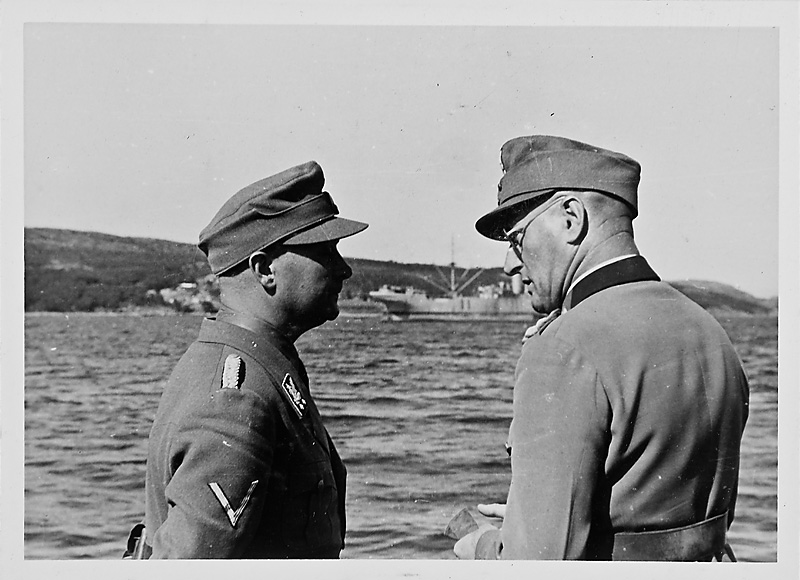
Gauleiter Karl Kaufmann (left) with Schörner during an official trip through Norway and Finland with Reich Commissioner Josef Terboven, July 1942

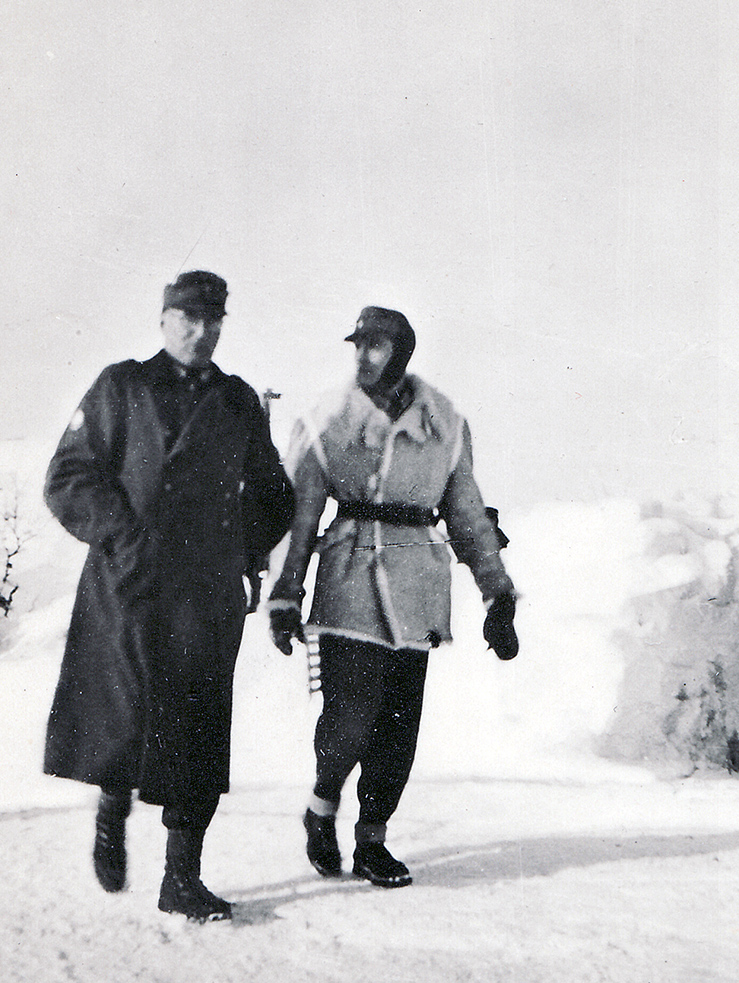
Schörner on inspection on the Arctic Ocean front, 1943

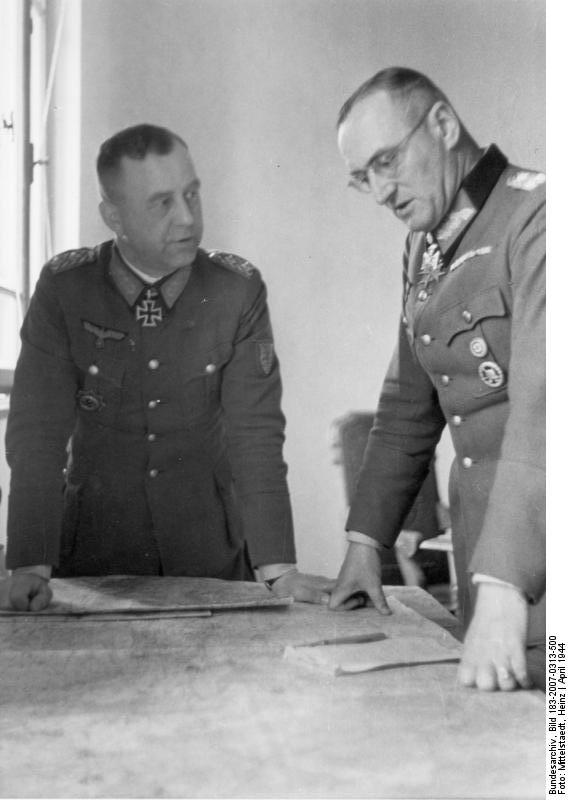
Schörner during a briefing with Infantry General Wöhler, commander-in-chief of an army group, holder of the Knight's Cross, 11 April 1944

Schörner commanded the 98th Mountain Regiment in the invasion of Poland in 1939. During the 1941 Balkans campaign, he commanded the German 6th Mountain Division and earned the Knight's Cross for his role in breaching the Metaxas Line. With this division, Schörner took part in Operation Barbarossa in June 1941. The 6th Gebirgs Division was assigned to the Arctic sectors in the Eastern Front. In 1942 as a General der Gebirgstruppe he took command of the XIX Mountain Corps, part of the German Army in Finland. With this command he participated in the failed attack on Murmansk and the stalemate war that followed. Schörner's task was to keep the Pechenga Nickel Works in German hands. When the Soviets opened an offensive against the Arctic sector, the division took part in the fighting. In February 1942, Schörner was promoted to the rank of Generalleutnant, commanding the Mountain Corps Norway. The corps was renamed XIX Mountain Army Corps on 4 November 1942.

He later commanded the XXXX Panzer Corps on the Eastern Front from November 1943 to January 1944. In March 1944 he was made commander of Army Group A, and in May commander of Army Group South Ukraine. After stating that the Crimean port of Sevastopol could be held for a long time even if Crimea fell, he changed his mind and against Hitler's wishes, evacuated the Black Sea port. This retreat occurred too late and the German–Romanian 17th Army that was holding Crimea suffered severe losses, with many men killed or captured while waiting on the piers to be evacuated. During the late spring of 1944, Schörner oversaw the retreat from the Dniester River in Romania.

Schörner was promoted to the rank of Generaloberst in May 1944. In July he became commander of Army Group North, which was later renamed Army Group Courland, where he stayed until January 1945 when he was made commander of Army Group Centre, defending Czechoslovakia and the upper reaches of the River Oder. He became a favorite of high-level Nazi leaders such as Joseph Goebbels, whose diary entries from March and April 1945 have many words of praise for Schörner and his methods. On 5 April 1945, Schörner was promoted to field marshal and was named as the new commander-in-chief of the German Army High Command (OKH, Oberkommando des Heeres) in Hitler's last testament. He nominally served in this post until the surrender of the Third Reich on 8 May 1945 but continued to command his army group, since no staff was available to him. He did not have any discernible political influence in the final days of the Reich.

On 7 May, the day General Alfred Jodl, Chief-of-Staff of the OKW was negotiating the surrender of all German forces at SHAEF, the last the OKW had heard from Schörner was on 2 May. He had reported he intended to fight his way west and surrender his army group to the Americans. On 8 May, OKW colonel Wilhelm Meyer-Detring was escorted through the American lines to contact Schörner. The colonel reported that Schörner had ordered his operational command to observe the surrender but he could not guarantee that he would be obeyed everywhere. (Note: Like many institutions in Nazi Germany, the control of the army was split between the OKW and the OKH. By 1945 OKW commanded all German forces in every theater apart from those on the Eastern Front, which were under OKH control and which, before his suicide, had reported directly to Hitler. So it was not clear if Schörner was under the command of OKW on 8 May or if President Karl Dönitz, or Chancellor von Krosigk, needed to order Schörner to surrender.) Schörner ordered a continuation of fighting against Red Army and the Czech insurgents of the Prague uprising. Later that day, Schörner deserted and flew to Austria, where he was arrested by the Americans on 18 May. Elements of Army Group Centre continued to resist the overwhelming force of the Red Army invading Czechoslovakia during the final Prague Offensive. Units of Army Group Centre, the last big German units to surrender, capitulated on 11 May 1945.

== Post-war trials and convictions ==
With the war over, Schörner handed himself in to the Americans on 18 May 1945, who a few weeks later passed him over to the Soviet authorities as a prisoner of war. In August 1951 he was charged with war crimes, and in February 1952 the Military Board of the Soviet Supreme Court sentenced him to 25 years imprisonment. A decree of the Presidium of the Supreme Soviet in April 1952 reduced this sentence to 12 and a half years. A decree of December 1954 allowed him to be handed over to authorities of East Germany, and he was released in 1955.

Returning to West Germany, he was arrested and charged with executions of German Army soldiers accused of desertion. Schörner was found guilty of manslaughter and attempted manslaughter and sentenced to four and a half years in prison. He was released on 4 August 1960 and lived in Munich until his death on 2 July 1973. At the time of his death, he was the last surviving field marshal of the Third Reich. On 7 December 1971, he gave an interview to Italian historian Francesco Fadini on his role and actions during the Austro-German victory at the Battle of Caporetto in World War I, but rarely spoke about his World War II service.

== Assessment ==
German veterans particularly criticized Schörner for a 1945 order that all soldiers found behind the front lines, who did not possess written orders to be there, were to be court-martialled on the spot and hanged if found guilty of desertion. This is mentioned in the writings of Siegfried Knappe, Hans von Luck and Joseph Goebbels. "Deserters get no mercy from him" Goebbels wrote of Schörner on 11 March 1945. "They are hanged from the nearest tree with a placard round their necks saying 'I am a deserter. I have declined to defend German women and children and therefore I have been hanged'". ("Ich bin ein Deserteur. Ich habe mich geweigert, deutsche Frauen und Kinder zu beschützen und bin deshalb aufgehängt worden.") Goebbels continued with, "Naturally such methods are effective. Every man in Schörner's area knows that he may die at the front but will inevitably die in the rear". Gottlob Herbert Bidermann, a German infantry officer, of the 132nd Infantry Division, who served in Schörner's command in 1944–45, reported in his memoirs that the General was despised by officers and men alike.

Schörner was said to be devoted to Hitler, a view that is seen as confirmed by Hitler's appointment of Schörner as his replacement as Commander-in-Chief of the German Army on his suicide in the Last will and testament of Adolf Hitler. Schörner did not hesitate to second Hitler's fantasy in the last weeks of the war, agreeing that the Red Army's main objective would be Prague instead of Berlin (in itself a colossal strategic blunder) and so leading him to weaken the critically thin defense lines in front of Berlin. Historian Ian Kershaw described him in 2011 (BBC History Magazine) as "extraordinarily brutal". In The End (2012) Kershaw describes Schörner as "a fanatical (Nazi) loyalist", an indication of this being that he had served for a brief spell in March 1944 as Chief of the NS Leadership Staff of the Army. The latter was responsible for coordinating relations between the military and the Nazi Party.

Schörner is commonly represented in historical literature as a simple disciplinarian and a slavish devotee of Adolf Hitler's defensive orders, after Germany lost the initiative in the second half of World War II in 1942/43. More recent research by American historian Howard Davis Grier and German historian Karl-Heinz Frieser depicts Schörner as a talented commander with "astonishing" organizational ability in managing an army group of 500,000 men during the fighting in late 1944 on the Eastern Front. He was harsh against superiors as well as subordinates and carried out operations on his own authority against Hitler's orders when he considered it necessary, such as the evacuation of the Sõrve Peninsula.

== Promotions ==
- Gefreiter: 1 April 1912
- Unteroffizier: 1 August 1912
- Vizefeldwebel (der Reserve): 22 May 1913
- Offiziersstellvertreter: 28 August 1914
- Leutnant (der Reserve der Infanterie): 29 November 1914
- Oberleutnant: 15 July 1918
- Hauptmann: 1 August 1926
- Major: 14 August 1934
- Oberstleutnant: 16 March 1937
- Oberst: 27 August 1939
- Generalmajor: 17 December 1941
- Generalleutnant: 28 February 1942
- General der Gebirgstruppe: 15 May 1942
- Generaloberst: 20 May 1944
- Generalfeldmarschall: 5 April 1945

== Awards and decorations ==
- Iron Cross (1914), 2nd and 1st Class
  - 2nd Class on 29 September 1914 (gazetted on 22 December 1914)
  - 1st Class on 27 January 1917
- Military Merit Order (Bavaria), 4th Class with Swords (BMV4bX/BM4X) on 11 October 1915
- Military Merit Cross (Austria-Hungary), 3rd Class with War Decoration (ÖM3K) on 20 April 1916
- Military Merit Order (Bavaria), 4th Class with Swords and Crown (BMV4aX/BM4XmKr) on 24 October 1917
- Pour le Mérite on 5 December 1917 (granted permission to accept on 17 December 1917)
- Golden Wedding Commemorative Badge (Erinnerungszeichen an die Goldene Hochzeit des Königspaares) on 20 February 1918
- Wound Badge (1918) in Mattweiß (Silver)
- Order of Merit (Chile), Officer's Cross on 16 March 1934
- Honour Cross of the World War 1914/1918 with Swords
- Wehrmacht Long Service Award, 4th to 1st Class (25-year Service Cross) on 2 October 1936
- Austrian War Commemorative Medal with Swords
- Order of the Crown of Italy, Commander on 2 August 1938
- Anschluss Medal on 8 November 1938
- Sudetenland Medal with Prague Castle Clasp (unknown date)
- Repetition Clasp 1939 to the Iron Cross 1914, 2nd and 1st Class
  - 2nd Class on 12 September 1939
  - 1st Class on 20 September 1939
- Bulgarian Order of Saint Alexander, II. Class (Grand Officer) with Swords (through the center) on 15 July 1941
- Order of the Cross of Liberty (Finland), 1st Class with Oak Leaves on 1 June 1942
- Eastern Front Medal on 1 August 1942
- Golden Party Badge on 30 January 1943
- Mentioned five times by name in the Wehrmachtbericht on 18 February 1944, 30 November 1944, 1 January 1945, 5 April 1945 and 9 May 1945
- Knight's Cross with Oak Leaves, Swords and Diamonds
  - Knight's Cross on 20 April 1941 as Generalmajor and Commander of the 6. Gebirgs-Division
  - 398th Oak Leaves on 17 February 1944 as General der Gebirgstruppe and Commanding General of the XXXX. Panzerkorps
  - 93rd Swords on 28 August 1944 as Generaloberst and Commander-in-Chief of the Heeresgruppe Nord
  - 23rd Diamonds on 1 January 1945 as Generaloberst and Commander-in-Chief of the Heeresgruppe Nord

== Sources ==
- German Federal Archives: BArch PERS 6/55, PERS 6/260423 and PERS 6/300883

== Notes ==
Military offices
Preceded by Generaloberst Johannes Frießner	Commander of Heeresgruppe Nord; 23 July 1944 – 27 January 1945	Succeeded by Generaloberst Dr. Lothar Rendulic
