= War Commemorative Medal (Austria) =

War Commemorative Medal Kriegserinnerungsmedaille
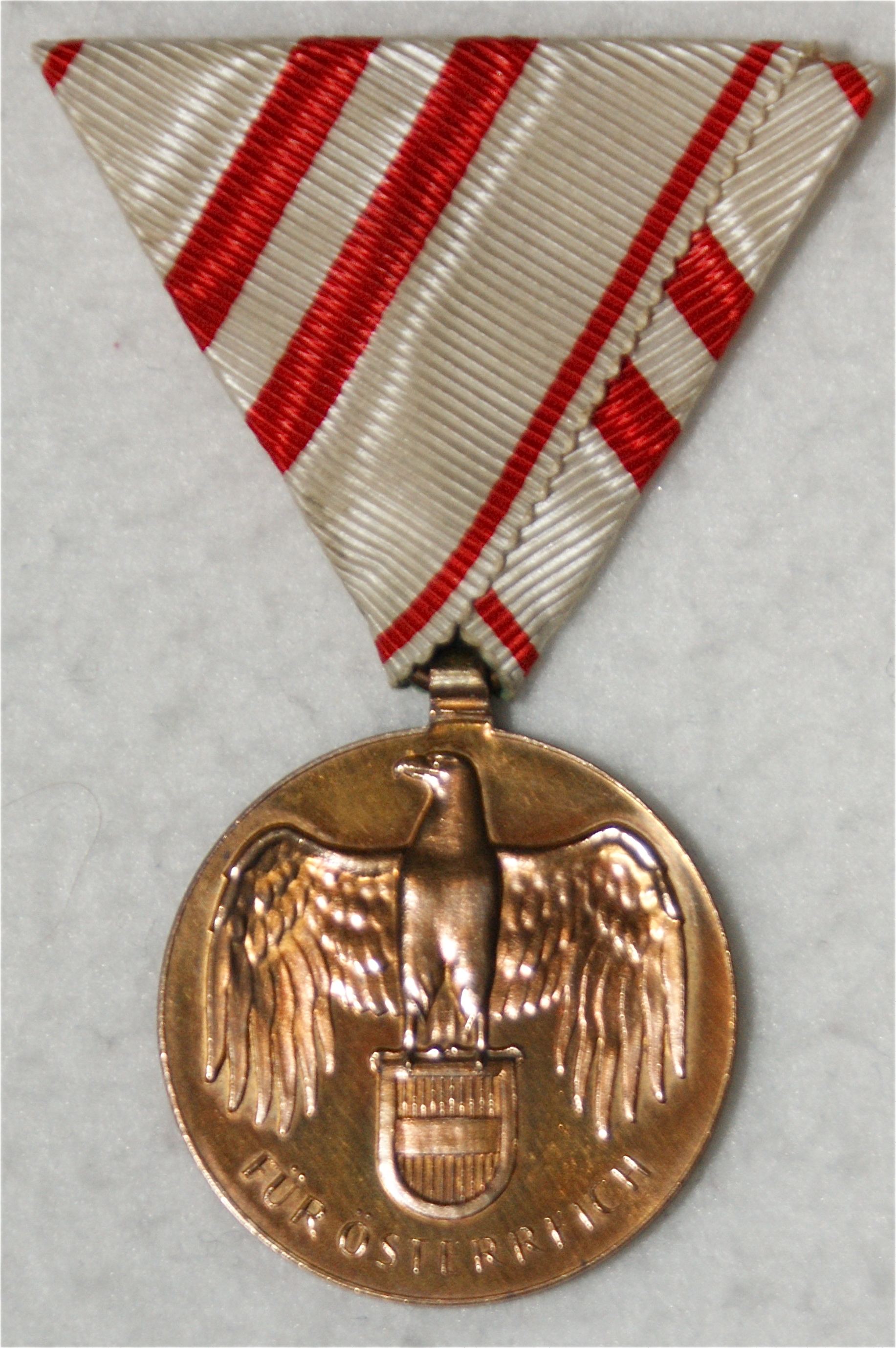
- Obverse of the medal without swords
- Type: Military commemorative medal
- Presented by: the First Austrian Republic
- Eligibility: Austrians who served during World War I
- Status: No longer awarded
- Established: 23 March 1933

The War Commemorative Medal (German: Kriegserinnerungsmedaille) was a commemorative medal established in 1933 by the First Republic of Austria. The medal was awarded to Austria's military participants in World War I.

== Appearance ==
The medallion of the medal is round, 33 mm (1.3 in) wide, and made of Tombac. The obverse of the medal depicts a right facing eagle surmounting the escutcheon with fess depicting the simplified arms of Austria. Below the eagle is the inscription FÜR ÖSTERREICH. The reverse of the medal bears the inscription 1914-1918 surrounded by a wreath of oak leaves around the edge.

The medal is suspended from a 40 mm (1.6 in) triangular ribbon (dreiecksband) of white with two central red stripes 4 mm (0.16 in) wide and thin red stripes at the edges as well. Combatants could wear crossed gilt swords on the ribbon.

Ribbons
Without Swords	With Swords
