= 2nd Mountain Division =

- 2. Gebirgs-Division
- Unit insignia
- Active: October 1938 – 8 May 1945
- Country: Nazi Germany
- Branch: German Army
- Type: Gebirgsjäger
- Role: Mountain warfare
- Size: Division
- Garrison/HQ: Wehrkreis XVIII, Innsbruck
- Engagements: World War II

The 2nd Mountain Division (German: 2. Gebirgs Division) was a Gebirgsjäger division of the German Army which served in World War II, mainly in the northernmost sector of the Eastern Front, near the Arctic. Formed in 1938, the division was disbanded at the end of the war in 1945.

== Operational history ==
Following the Anschluss, the annexation of Austria by Nazi Germany in March 1938, the 2nd Mountain Division was formed on 1 April 1938, with personnel of the 6th Division of the Austrian Army. Based at Innsbruck, part of Wehrkreis XVIII, most of its men were from the Salzburg and Tyrol region of Austria.

Commanded by Generalleutnant (Lieutenant General) Valentin Feurstein, it fought as part of Army Group South during the Invasion of Poland and then took part in Operation Weserübung, the Norwegian Campaign in 1940. It carried out a cross country march to rescue the 3rd Mountain Division, which was under siege from British forces during the Battles of Narvik.

The division moved into Lapland as part of Mountain Corps Norway in 1941, to participate in Operation Silberfuchs (Operation Silver Fox), the attack on the Soviet Arctic as part of Operation Barbarossa. It drove for Murmansk but was unsuccessful in the face of strong Soviet defence. It continued to serve in the Arctic region until late 1944, when the Finns negotiated the Moscow Armistice with the Soviet Union. The division had to withdraw to Norway, fighting off Soviet forces as it did so. Back in mainland Europe, its depleted infantry regiments were brought back up to strength.

In 1945, the division was transferred to the Western Front, where it fought in the Saar-Moselle Triangle against US troops. During this period, its commander, Generalleutnant Hans Degen, was wounded and had to be replaced by Generalleutnant Willibald Utz. While earlier in the war it was considered an elite unit, the 2nd Mountain Division was well below strength and combat effectiveness. It finished the war in Württemberg where Utz surrendered it to the Western Allies.

== Commanding officers ==
The following officers commanded the division:

- Generalleutnant Valentin Feurstein (1 April 1938 – 4 March 1941)
- Generalleutnant Ernst Schlemmer (4 March 1941 – 2 March 1942)
- Generalleutnant Georg Ritter von Hengl (2 March 1942 – 23 October 1943)
- Generalleutnant Hans Degen (1 November 1943 – 6 February 1945)
- Oberst (Colonel) Hans Roschmann (6 February 1945 – 9 February 1945)
- Generalleutnant Willibald Utz (9 February 1945 – German capitulation)
