= Kestenga =

Kestenga Кестеньга Kiestinki (Karelian)
- Posyolok
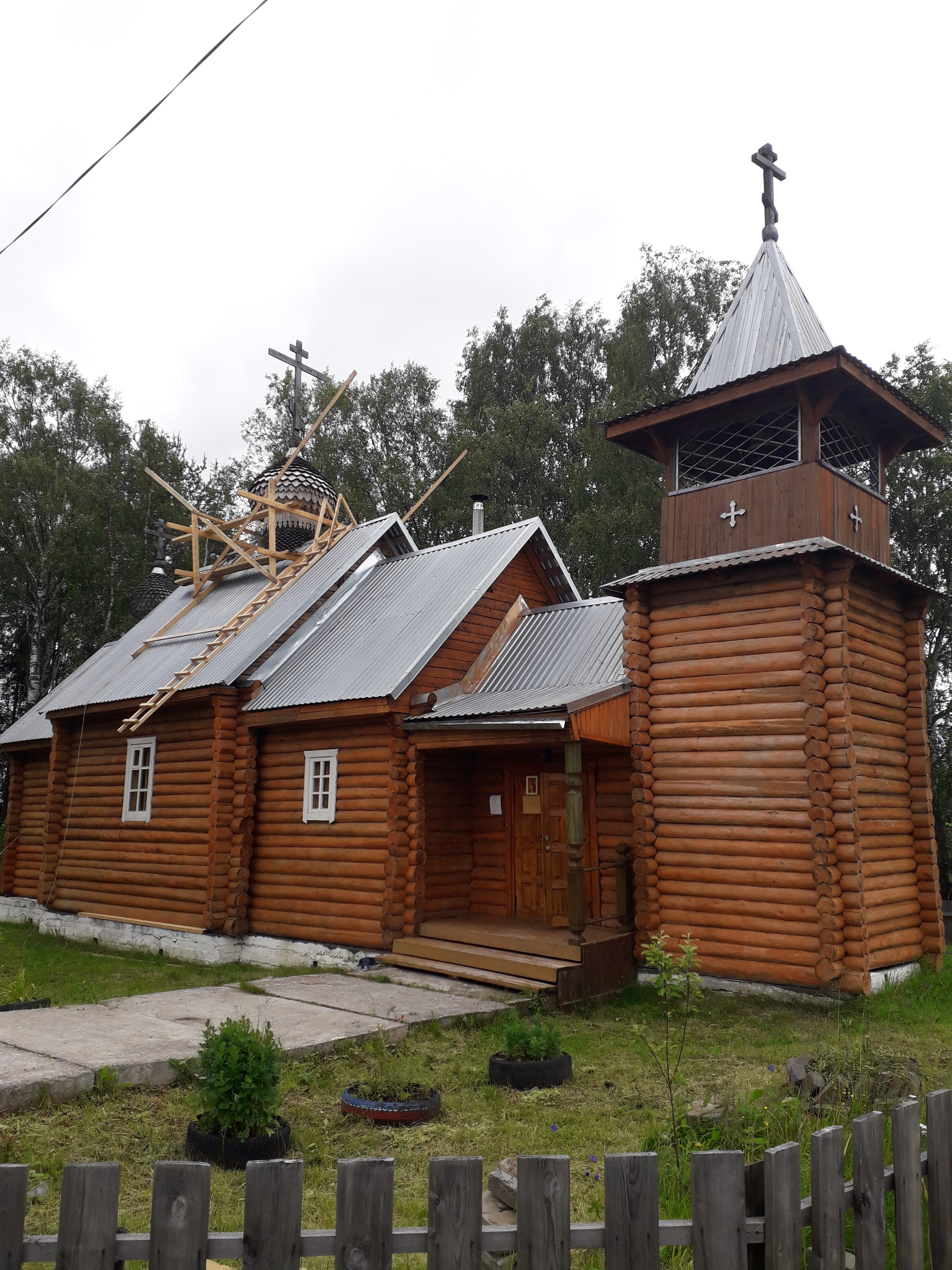
- The church of Kestenga in 2021
- Interactive map of Kestenga
- Location of Kestenga Kestenga (Karelia)
- Coordinates: 65°53′7″N 31°49′53″E
- Country: Russia
- Federal subject: Republic of Karelia
- Administrative district: Loukhsky District

Population (2010 Census)
  - Total: 1,277
  - Estimate (2021): 908 (−28.9%)

Municipal status
  - Municipal district: Loukhsky Municipal District
  - Rural settlement: Kestengskoye Rural Settlement
  - Capital of: Kestengskoye Rural Settlement
- Time zone: UTC+3 (UTC+03:00)
- Postal code: 186664
- OKTMO ID: 86621425101

Kestenga (Russian: Кестеньга; Karelian: Kiestinki; Finnish: Kiestinki) is a rural village in the Loukhsky District of the Republic of Karelia in Russia on the northern shore of Lake Topozero.

It is the administrative centre of the Kestenga rural settlement.
There is a railway station on the Loukhi-Pyaozersky line.
As of the 2013 Census, its population was 1,117.

The village was at the center of the Battle of Kestenga in 1941 between the Finnish and Soviet Army during the Continuation War.

== History ==
One of the oldest settlements in the Loukhsky district. The history of the settlement dates back to the XV—XVI centuries. The first mention dates back to 1547. In 1628, the settlement was mentioned in a decree of Tsar Mikhail Fedorovich as the center of the community on Topozera. In the XVII century, a monastery operated on the bank of the Topozer.

In December 1708, by decree of Peter I, during the regional reform, the Arkhangelsk governorate was formed. In 1719, the Arkhangelsk province was formed in its composition, divided into districts. Kestenga belonged to the Dvinsky district. In 1727, the districts were renamed counties.

In 1775-1785, Catherine II carried out a territorial reform. A new, larger Vologda viceroyalty was established from the Arkhangelsk governorate, which was divided into two oblast — Vologodskaya and Arkhangelskaya. In 1773, the Olonets province was created as part of two counties: Olonets and Vytegorsky and Lopka Padan districts. In 1782, the city of Povenets was established, the Padan district was renamed Povenetsky. In May 1785, from the northern part of the Povenetsky Uyezd and part of the territory of the Onega Uyezd of the Arkhangelsk viceroyalty, the Kemsky Uyezd was formed, which became part of the Olonets viceroyalty. From that moment on, Kestenga turned out to be the Kemsky District, which existed until 1927.

In 1796, the Kemsky district, and with it Kestenga, were transferred to the Arkhangelsk governorate.

According to the records of the villages of the north-western White Sea region for 1870, the first inhabitants at the mouth of the Kestenga River on the Topozer are considered to be old-timers from the genus of a Laplander named Keme. Folk legend claims that the Kem (Kemovs) were Karelians by nationality.

In 1920, the Kemsky Uyezd, and with it the Kestengsky volost, were transferred to the Karelian Labor Commune created by decree of the Central Executive Committee.

During the Russian Civil War, the Karelian Uprising took place in the winter of 1921-1922. By the end of December 1921, Karelo-Finnish detachments already numbered 5,000–6,000 people and occupied part of eastern Karelia up to the Kestenga—Suomussalmi—Rugozero—Padany—Porosozero line. On January 25, 1921, the northern grouping of Soviet troops occupied Kestenga.

In 1923, the Karelian Labor Commune was transformed into an Autonomous Karelian SSR, divided into counties. Kestengskaya volost was transferred to Ukhta Uyezd (1923-1927), formed from the western part of Kemsky Uyezd.

Until 1927, the settlement served as the administrative center of the district, which included half of the territory of the current Kandalakshsky district of the Murmansk oblast and the entire territory of the current Loukhsky district.

On August 29, 1927, the county division in the AKSSR was abolished. Districts were formed instead of counties. The territory of Ukhta County was divided between Kesteng and Ukhta districts.

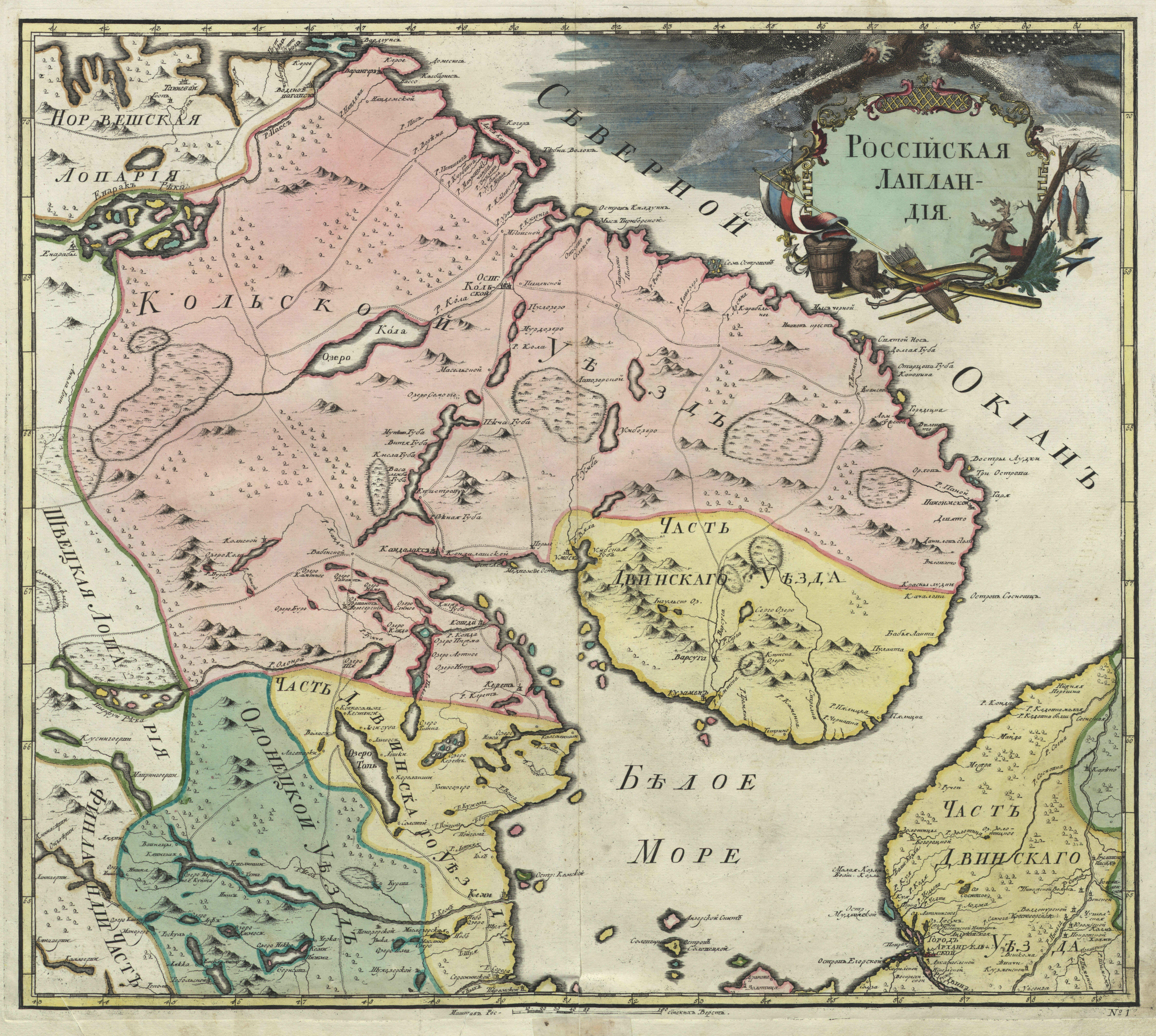
Kestenga on the map of Russian Lapland, 1745

During the Great Patriotic War, the village was occupied by German troops. There was a German hospital (sanatorium) in Kesteng. In the Museum of Local Lore of the Finnish city of Kuusamo, photographs depicting Heinrich Himmler on the pier of the village of Kestenga. In 1942, Soviet troops launched the Kesteng offensive to liberate the village, which ended in failure.

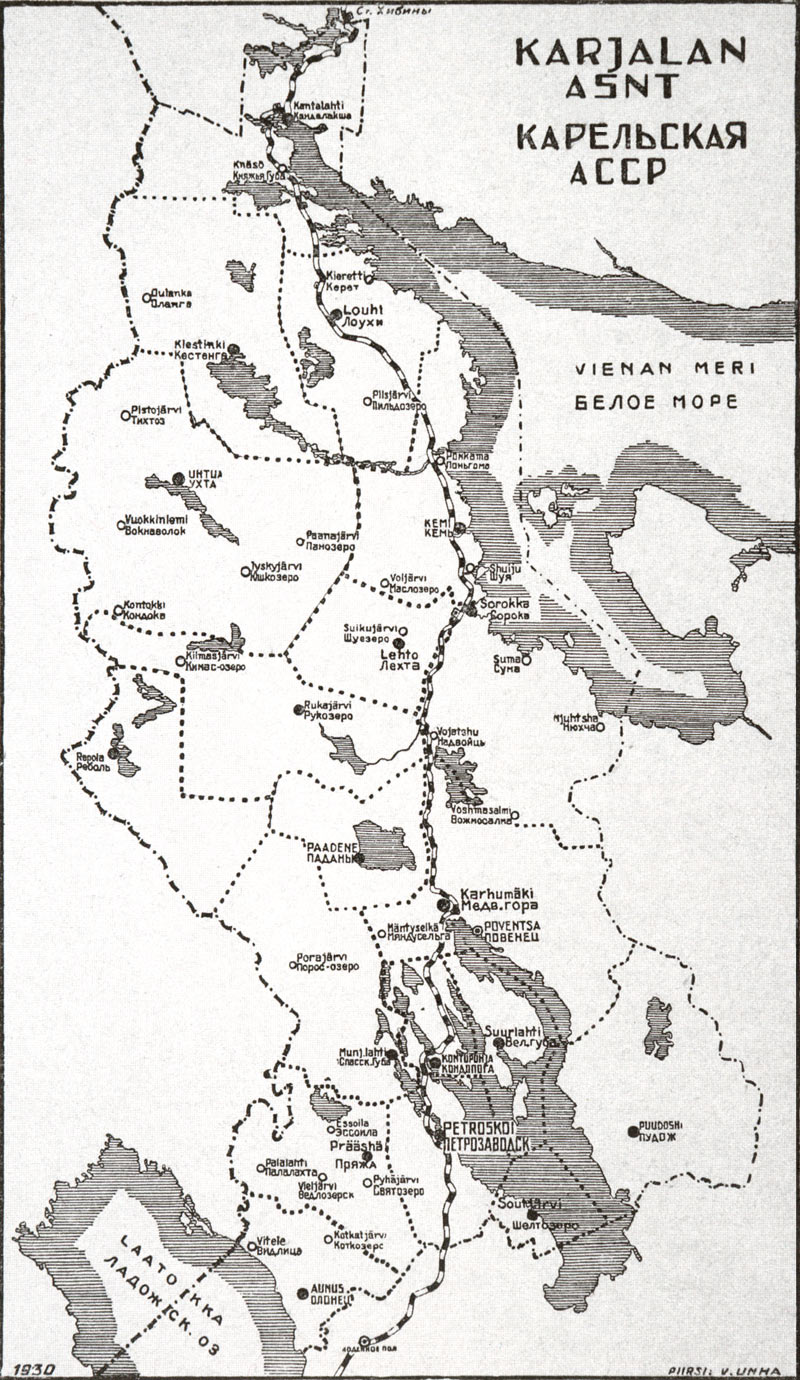
Kestengsky district on the map of the Autonomous Karelian SSR, 1930

Near the village there is a German cemetery, partially looted by black diggers, partially exported to Germany.

In 1955-1956, the Kestengsky district was liquidated, its territory was annexed to the Loukhsky district.
