= Ontojärvi – Nurmesjärvi =

Lake in Finland

- Location within Finland
- Location: Kainuu
- Coordinates: 64°08′N 29°13′E
- Primary inflows: lakes Lentua, Lammasjärvi, Vieksijärvi
- Primary outflows: river Ontojoki to the lake Iso-Kiimanen
- Catchment area: Oulujoki
- Basin countries: Finland
- Surface area: 104.572 km^{2} (40.375 sq mi)
- Average depth: 5.76 m (18.9 ft)
- Max. depth: 29 m (95 ft)
- Water volume: 0.602 km^{3} (488,000 acre⋅ft)
- Shore length^{1}: 315.87 km (196.27 mi)
- Surface elevation: 159.2 m (522 ft)
- ^{1} Shore length is not a well-defined measure.

Ontojärvi–Nurmesjärvi is a rather large lake in the Oulujoki main catchment area in Kainuu, Finland. It is situated in the municipality of Kuhmo. It is the 44th largest lake in the country.
