= Kalevalsky =

Kalevalsky (masculine), Kalevalskaya (feminine), or Kalevalskoye (neuter) may refer to:

- Kalevalsky District, a district of the Republic of Karelia, Russia
- Kalevalskoye Urban Settlement, a municipal formation which the urban-type settlement of Kalevala and one rural locality in Kalevalsky District of the Republic of Karelia, Russia are incorporated as
