= Loukhsky =

Loukhsky (masculine), Loukhskaya (feminine), or Loukhskoye (neuter) may refer to:

- Loukhsky District, a district of the Republic of Karelia, Russia
- Loukhskoye Urban Settlement, a municipal formation which the urban-type settlement of Loukhi in Loukhsky District of the Republic of Karelia, Russia is incorporated as
