= 54th Rifle Division =

54th Mountain Rifle Division (15 Mar 1936 – Jan 1940) 54th Rifle Division (Jan. 1940–1945; 1955–1957)
- Active: 1936–1945 (1st Formation); 1955–1957 (2nd Formation)
- Country: Soviet Union
- Branch: Red Army
- Type: Infantry
- Engagements: World War II; Winter War; Battle of Kuhmo; Continuation War; East Prussian Offensive; Prague Offensive
- Decorations: Order of Lenin (1st formation); Order of the Red Banner (1st and 2nd formations); Order of Kutuzov, 2nd class (1st formation)
- Battle honours: Masuria (1st formation)

The 54th Rifle Division was an infantry division of the Soviet Union's Red Army and Soviet Army, formed twice. The division was formed in 1936 and fought in the Winter War. The division spent most of World War II in Karelia fighting with Finnish troops in the Continuation War. After Finland left the war the division was relocated southward and fought in the East Prussian Offensive and the Prague Offensive in 1945. The division was disbanded in the summer of that year. The 54th Rifle Division was awarded the Order of Lenin, the Order of the Red Banner and the Order of Kutuzov 2nd class. It was also awarded the honorific "Masuria" for its actions in the East Prussian Offensive. The division was reformed in 1955 from the 341st Rifle Division and became a motor rifle division in 1957.

== History ==
The division was formed on 15 March 1936 as the 54th Mountain Rifle Division from the Separate Murmansk Rifle Brigade. On 21 May, it became the 54th Murmansk Mountain Rifle Division. On 17 May 1939, the 104th Mountain Rifle Division was created from the division's 337th Rifle Regiment. On 4 June, the division formed a new 337th Rifle Regiment. In September 1939, the division was mobilized. The division fought in the Winter War. In November, the division became part of the newly formed 9th Army. The division's objective was to capture the railway junction at Kuhmo.

The division's 81st Mountain Rifle Regiment was detached and sent to the 163rd Rifle Division and fought in the Battle of Suomussalmi. In early December, the regiment crossed the Finnish border at Juntusranta and moved on Suomussalmi from the north. On 9 December, two companies of the regiment attacked Finnish positions on the southern bank of Niskaselka but were repulsed with heavy losses. The depleted regiment then took positions in Hulkoniemi. On 27 December, attacks from four Finnish battalions broke through regimental defenses, forcing it to retreat to division headquarters. 163rd Rifle Division commander Alexei Zelentsov decided to retreat. The 81st moved north across the ice of Lake Kiantajärvi on 28 December.

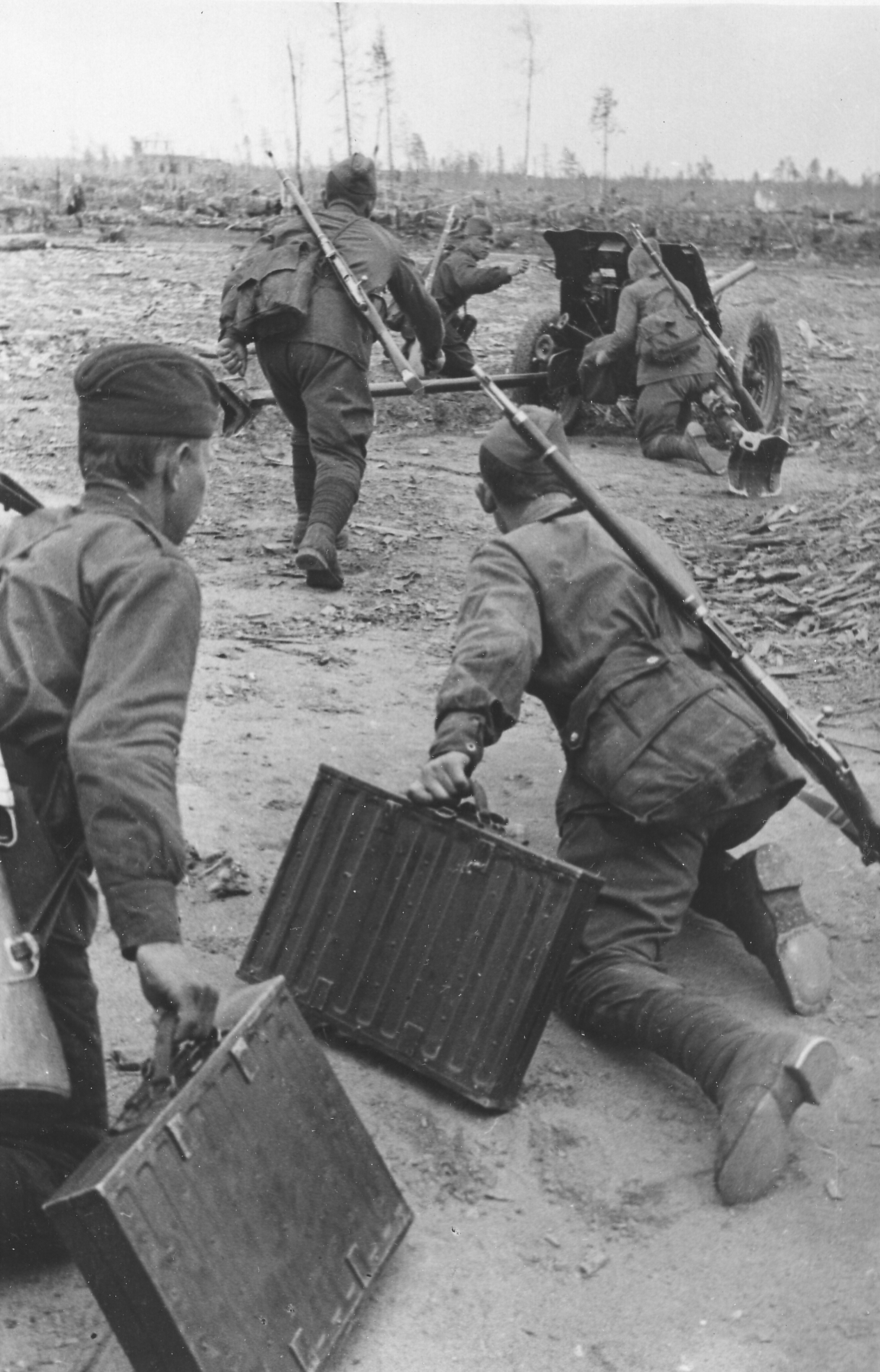
A crew of Sergeant Grigory Mikhailovich Shafeyev's 45 mm anti-tank gun battery of the division's 81st Rifle Regiment prepares to open fire, June 1943

In January 1940, the 54th became a regular infantry division. The division had been stopped 15 kilometers southeast of Kuhmo in its advance, After Suomussalmi, the Finnish sent the 9th Infantry Division to encircle and destroy the 54th. On 29 January, the Finnish troops attack and cut off the 54th's rear units at Reuhkavaara. To prevent a repeat of Suomussalmi, 9th Army commander Vasily Chuikov sent reinforcements to relieve the division. The 54th was separated into several isolated pockets, but the threat from Soviet reinforcements forced the Finnish to divert troops. On 8 March, Finnish troops overran the pocket containing the 54th's headquarters. Half of the troops there were able to escape west. When the war ended on 13 March, the Finnish troops were within 40 meters of Soviet positions. During the Kuhmo battles, the 54th suffered casualties of slightly more than 2,000 killed.

On 22 June 1941, the division held the line of Kem, Kalevala and Repola, which was 100 to 250 kilometers from what was then the Finnish border. It was part of the 7th Army. The division's 81st and 118th Rifle Regiments covered Kalevala and the 337th Rifle Regiment defended Repola. From 3 July, the regiment defended Repola against attacks of the 14th Infantry Division. Finnish troops did not succeed in a frontal assault, and instead outflanked the regiment after 15 July. The regiment retreated to the north and then east on 24 July. In early August 1941, the regiment reached Rugozero and became part of the 27th Rifle Division.

The main forces of the division were on the Voinitsa River, where they fought elements of the Finnish 3rd Infantry Division's Group F. On 10 July, fierce fighting began for control of the village of Voinitsa. The division held positions there for the next nine days, retreating towards Kalevala. Finnish troops advanced to Korpijärvi on 23 July where they attacked along the northern shore of Lake Keski-Kuittijärvi. Some Finnish troops were sent to the lake's southern shore, where they moved into the village of Enonsu and sent patrols out, which were stopped near Luusalmi. The 54th Rifle Division took positions on the Kis-Kis river northwest of Kalavala. There, the division stopped the Finnish advance on 19 August 1941. In September, the Finnish troops again attacked, but were repulsed. On 19 September, the 337th Rifle Regiment returned to control of the division.

The division defended Kalevala until 1944, with its left wing on Lake Keski-Kuittijärvi. During this period, it conducted small-scale offensive operations.

In September 1944, Finland was knocked out of the war and the division fought in the pursuit towards Kandalaksha and Kestenga and advanced to the pre-1941 Soviet border. The division held positions there until 14 November and became part of the 31st Army in December 1944. The division held positions northwest of Suwałki.

From January 1945, the division fought in the East Prussian Offensive. The division advanced in the army's second echelon towards Giżycko and entered combat in the Masurian Lakes region. On 27 January, it fought in the capture of Barciany and attacked through Kętrzyn. The division reached the Vistula Lagoon and helped capture Heiligenbeil on 25 March. On 2 April, the 31st Army was transferred to the 1st Ukrainian Front and the division took positions southwest of Bunzlau. From 6 May, the division fought in the Prague Offensive and ended the war in Czechoslovakia.

The division was disbanded "in place" with the Central Group of Forces during the summer of 1945.

In 1955, the division was formed from the 341st Rifle Division at Alakurtti with the 6th Army. On 4 June 1957 it became the 54th Motor Rifle Division.

== Composition ==
The division included the following units.

- 337th Rifle Regiment (to 28 July 1941; from 19 September 1941)
- 81st Red Banner Rifle Regiment
- 118th Rifle Regiment
- 86th Artillery Regiment (until 27 October 1941)
- 491st Howitzer Artillery Regiment (up to 5 October 1941)
- 58th Separate Anti-Tank Battalion (up to 9 October 1941; from 12 January 1942)
- 388th Anti-Aircraft Artillery Battery (later 148th Separate Anti-Aircraft Artillery Battalion; up to 25 May 1943)
- 366th Mortar Battalion (from 22 October 1941 to 10 October 1942)
- 34th Reconnaissance Company
- 16th Engineer-Sapper Battalion
- 904th (later 49th) Separate Communications Battalion (later 814th Separate Communication Company)
- 29th Medical Battalion
- 181st Motor Transport Battalion (up to 9 October 1941)
- 173rd (later 181st) Trucking Company
- 95th Field Artillery Repair Workshop
- 161st Divisional Veterinary Hospital
- 164th Field Bakery (later 27th Field Mobile Bakery)
- 192nd Field Post Office
- 190th Field Ticket Office of the State Bank
