= Lentiira =

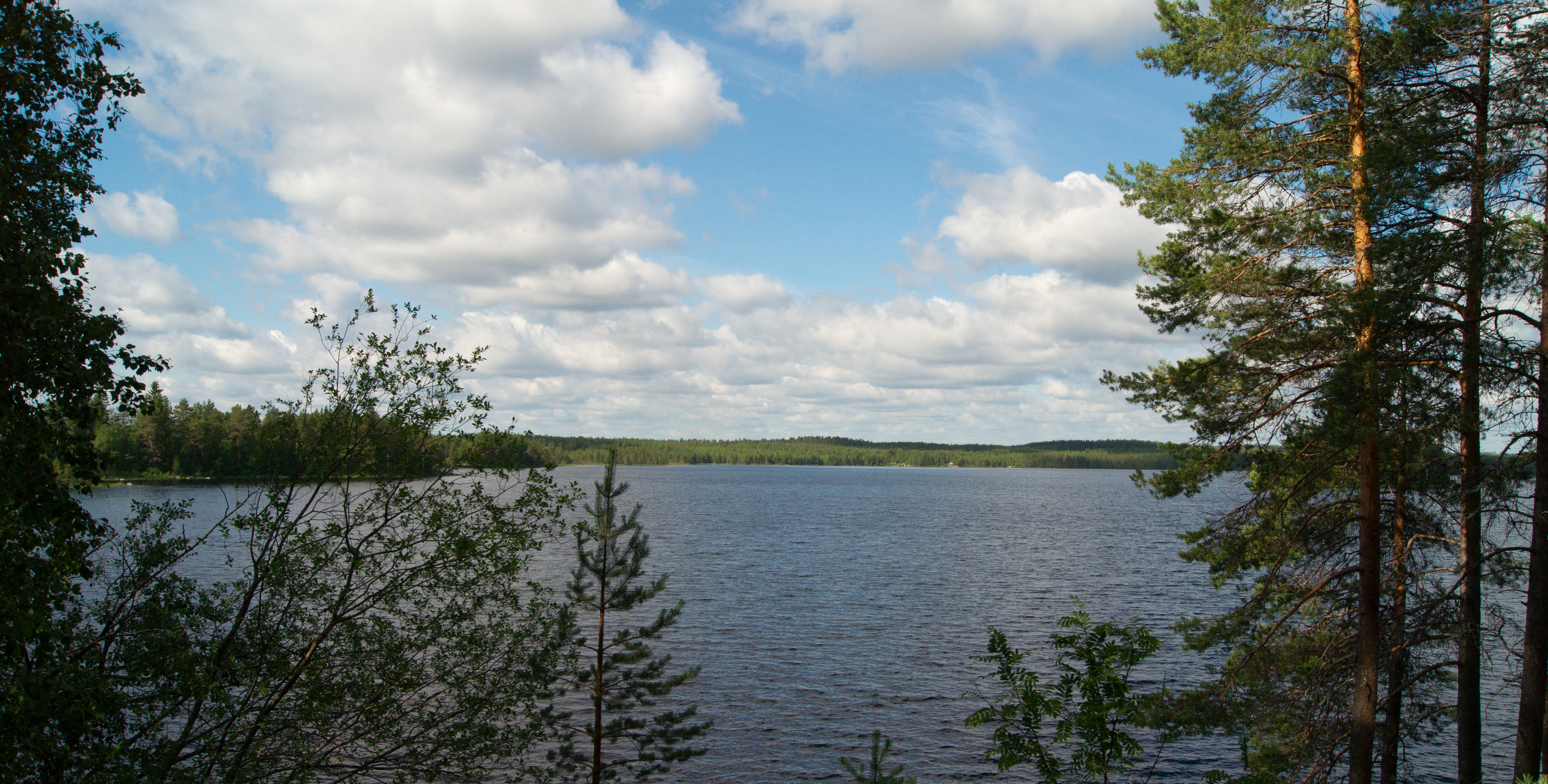

- Location within Finland
- Location: Kuhmo
- Coordinates: 64°26′N 029°47′E
- Type: Lake
- Primary inflows: Satulavirta
- Basin countries: Finland
- Surface area: 18.428 km^{2} (7.115 sq mi)
- Average depth: 5.54 m (18.2 ft)
- Max. depth: 27 m (89 ft)
- Water volume: 0.102 km^{3} (83,000 acre⋅ft)
- Shore length^{1}: 90.16 km (56.02 mi)
- Surface elevation: 173.3 m (569 ft)
- Frozen: November–April
- ^{1} Shore length is not a well-defined measure.

Lentiira is a medium-sized lake of Finland. It belongs to Oulujoki main catchment area and it is situated in Kuhmo municipality in the Kainuu region. The lake is quite narrow and deep with long bays. It belongs to Lentiira–Iivantiira–Lentua kayaking route named The Tar Route.

== See also ==
- List of lakes in Finland
