= Dolin Ski Brigade =

Red Army military unit during the Winter War

- Active: February 1940
- Country: Soviet Union
- Branch: Red Army
- Size: 1,800
- Engagements: Winter War: Battle of Kuhmo
- Commander: Vjatšeslav Dmitrievitš Dolin

The Dolin Ski Brigade was a Red Army fighting unit led by Colonel Vjatšeslav Dmitrievitš Dolin during the Winter War. Well-equipped and composed primarily of Siberians with skiing expertise, the brigade was an elite unit. It was formed from three ski battalions of the 9th Soviet Army and was tasked with relieving the encircled 54th Rifle Division during the Battle of Kuhmo. The brigade was destroyed by Finnish forces during the battle, with the vast majority killed in action.

== Winter War (destruction in the Battle of Kuhmo) ==
The ski brigade's first combat action occurred on 2 February 1940 as it moved toward the direction of Kuhmo to assist the 54th Rifle Division. The 54th Rifle Division was about 45 kilometers from Kuhmo and was in the process of being surrounded by Finnish forces. Over the next three days, Dolin's forces attempted to disrupt the Finnish supply route from Löytövaara, but were mostly unsuccessful. The ski brigade had suffered 400 killed and was pushed back into Soviet territory.

The ski brigade began a second attempt to assist the 54th Rifle Division. By 12 February it had advanced 10 kilometers into Finnish territory and had defeated several smaller Finnish units along the way. Using the cover of darkness, Finnish forces led by Lauri Timonen caught the ski brigade by surprise as it camped for the night. Colonel Dolin and several senior officers were killed during the fighting.

On 13 February, the ski brigade took control of the service road used by the Finnish 27th Infantry Regiment in Kesseli, east of Kuhmo. The Finns attacked just after midnight but were stopped by an effective defense. Fighting continued throughout the next day, which saw temperatures drop to −40 °C (−40 °F). Finnish forces continued their attack and saw the ski brigade's headquarters set on fire during the fighting. The ski brigade's defense started to collapse and began to withdraw from their position. The fighting saw about 400 Soviet troops killed. On the Finnish side were six Finnish troops killed and 22 injured.

By 15 February, the ski brigade had been reduced to less than half of its original strength and had been broken up into groups of about 50 men. These remaining units were in the process of retreating toward Kesseli while Finnish forces continued to attack. By the end of the day, the Finns had encircled the ski brigade. The Finns attacked under the cover of darkness, making use of hand grenades and submachine guns. Fighting was fierce, but at the end of the four-hour battle the ski brigade had been destroyed, with 1,700 killed out of an original force of 1,800. The Finns obtained about 400 automatic weapons.

According to a battle report from the 9th Soviet Army, Dolin's ski brigade did not receive any honors. Several factors contributed to the destruction of Dolin's forces. Soviet movement had been hampered by the poor maps at their disposal. The death of Colonel Dolin likely contributed to the problems faced by the ski brigade, as the unit was forced to fight without clear leadership from that point forward. The Finns also estimated that the extreme temperatures hampered the ski brigade's fighting ability due to weapons not being degreased. In addition, their clothing may also have played a factor, as the hoods used by soldiers on guard may have prevented them from hearing approaching Finnish troops.

== Sources ==
=== English ===
- Irincheev, Bair (2012). War of the White Death: Finland Against the Soviet Union, 1939-40. Stackpole Books. ISBN 978-081-171-088-6.
- Nenye, Vesa; Munter, Peter; Wirtanen, Toni; Birks, Chris (2015). Finland at War: The Winter War 1939–40. Bloomsbury Publishing. ISBN 978-147-281-359-6.

=== Finnish ===
- Sotatieteen laitos. Sotahistorian toimisto (1991). Talvisodan Historia (in Finnish). Werner Söderström Osakeyhtiö. ISBN 951-0-17565-X.
- Enkenberg, Ilkka (2020). Talvisota Väreissä (in Finnish). Readme.fi. ISBN 978-952-373-053-3.
- Raunio, Ari; Kilin, Juri (2007). Talvisodan Taisteluja (in Finnish). Karttakeskus. ISBN 978-951-593-068-2.
