= Chupa (inhabited locality) =

Chupa (Russian: Чупа́) is the name of several inhabited localities in the Republic of Karelia, Russia.

Urban localities

- Chupa, Republic of Karelia, an urban-type settlement in Loukhsky District

Rural localities

- Chupa (Yanishpolskoye Rural Settlement), Kondopozhsky District, Republic of Karelia, a village in Kondopozhsky District; municipally, a part of Yanishpolskoye Rural Settlement of that district
- Chupa (Konchezerskoye Rural Settlement), Kondopozhsky District, Republic of Karelia, a village in Kondopozhsky District; municipally, a part of Konchezerskoye Rural Settlement of that district
- Chupa (station), Loukhsky District, Republic of Karelia, a station in Loukhsky District
