= Chupa =

Chupa may refer to:

- Chupa (2023 film), a film about a chupacabra named Chupa
- Chupa (inhabited locality), several inhabited localities in Russia
- Chupa District, Peru
- Chupá, a corregimiento in Los Santos Province, Panama
- an alternative spelling of chuppah, a Jewish wedding canopy
- an alternative spelling of chuba, a Tibetan robe
- original name of Helium, an American alternative rock band
- Chupa, a vampire in the 2002 film Blade II
- Licania platypus, a tree species native to Central America

== See also ==
- Chupa Chups, a Spanish brand of lollipop and other confectionery
