= Iivantiira =

Iivantiira–Juttuajärvi
- Location within Finland
- Coordinates: 64°21.6′N 29°32.3′E
- Type: Lake
- Primary inflows: Salmelansalmi strait
- Primary outflows: Satulavirta
- Basin countries: Finland
- Surface area: 32.295 km^{2} (12.469 sq mi)
- Average depth: 4.89 m (16.0 ft)
- Max. depth: 27 m (89 ft)
- Water volume: 0.158 km^{3} (128,000 acre⋅ft)
- Shore length^{1}: 136.46 km (84.79 mi)
- Surface elevation: 173.6 m (570 ft)
- Frozen: November–April
- ^{1} Shore length is not a well-defined measure.

Iivantiira is a medium-sized lake of Finland. It belongs to Oulujoki main catchment area and it is situated in Kuhmo municipality in the Kainuu region. Iivantiira is connected to the lake Juttuajärvi with Hoikka strait, and together they form a lake Iivantiira–Juttuajärvi. The lake belongs to Änättijärvi–Lentiira–Iivantiira–Lentua-Sotkamo kayaking route named Tervareitti, The Tar Route.
