= Boris Lazarev =

Soviet fighter pilot

Boris Lazarev was a Soviet fighter pilot assigned to the 7th Air Army of the Karelian Front who flew a Hawker Hurricane during the Second World War. Lazarev's aircraft was shot down in 1943. He is known for his body being found mummified in 1998. Lazarev's shootdown was German fighter ace Rudolf Müller's final kill.

== Death ==
On February 21, 1943, 22-year-old Boris Lazarev's Hurricane was on patrol in the Karelia area when he was engaged by German ace Rudolf Müller. Lazarev's aircraft was disabled and came down partially intact in a nearby swamp.

Boris attempted to bail out from the aircraft, but was too low and he was thrown from the aircraft on impact. The impact of the crash severed both of Lazarev's feet, and smashed his face against the instrument panel, killing him before throwing him free of the wreckage.

== Discovery ==
In 1998, American and Russian researchers came across details of Lazarev's dogfight in some old WWII-era records. Intrigued, Russian historian Yuriy Rybin and a team of researchers traveled to the swamp area near where his last position was noted. They soon found the first pieces of the aircraft's wreckage.

Using a crane, the remains of the Hurricane were hoisted out of the swamp. Nearby, Lazarev's mummified body was found, while both of his feet were found still inside the aircraft's cockpit. The leaking oil and fuel from the crash, as well as the favorable conditions of the swamp, led to his body being mummified instead of decomposing. Also found with the body were Lazarev's identification papers, some money, a personal knife, and his Tokarev TT-33 service pistol.

The aircraft's wreckage was moved to a restoration facility where the aircraft was partially repaired. Its current status is unknown. Lazarev's body was buried with full military honors at the WWII memorial cemetery in the nearby settlement of Chupa. Despite a government-backed search, no living relatives of Boris Lazarev were found.
