= Jonkeri =

Lake in Kuhmo, Finland

- Location within Finland
- Coordinates: 63°50′N 29°55′E
- Primary outflows: Siltakoski rapids, river Jongunjoki
- Basin countries: Finland
- Surface area: 13.981 km^{2} (5.398 sq mi)
- Average depth: 3.91 m (12.8 ft)
- Max. depth: 18.8 m (62 ft)
- Water volume: 0.0547 km^{3} (44,300 acre⋅ft)
- Shore length^{1}: 73.55 km (45.70 mi)
- Surface elevation: 195.6 m (642 ft)
- Frozen: November–May
- Islands: Uittosaari, Lammassaari, Kalmosaari, Kontusaari
- ^{1} Shore length is not a well-defined measure.

Jonkeri is a medium-sized lake in Kuhmo, Finland. It belongs to the Vuoksi main catchment area and is situated in Kainuu region.

The Russian border is only four kilometers from the lake. Historically the lake has been a border between Sweden and Russia. The border stone called Jonkerinkivi is situated on the lake and it shows the border place of the 17th century based on the Treaty of Stolbovo.

== See also ==
- List of lakes in Finland
