= Battle of Kuhmo =

Battle fought during the Winter War

- Part of the Winter War
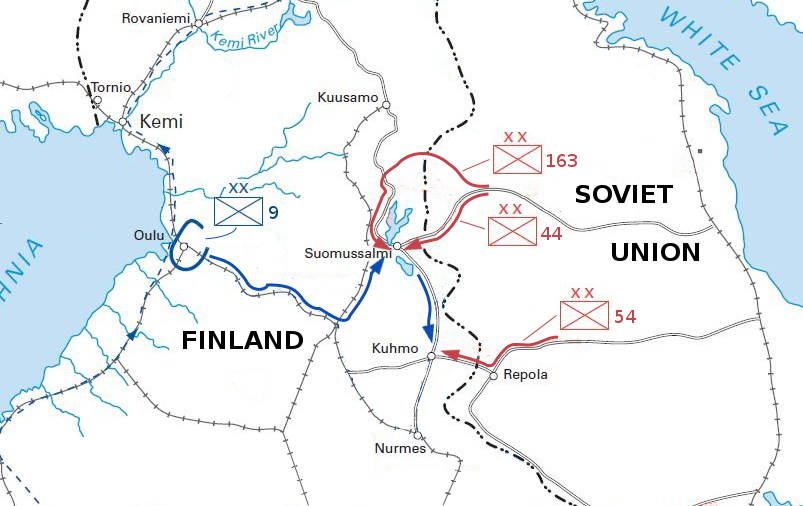
- Positions of the Army units
Date	January 28, 1940 — March 13, 1940
Location	Kuhmo, Finland 64°50′53″N 29°19′35″E
Result	Stalemate

Belligerents
Finland	Soviet Union

Commanders and leaders
	54th Soviet Rifle Division
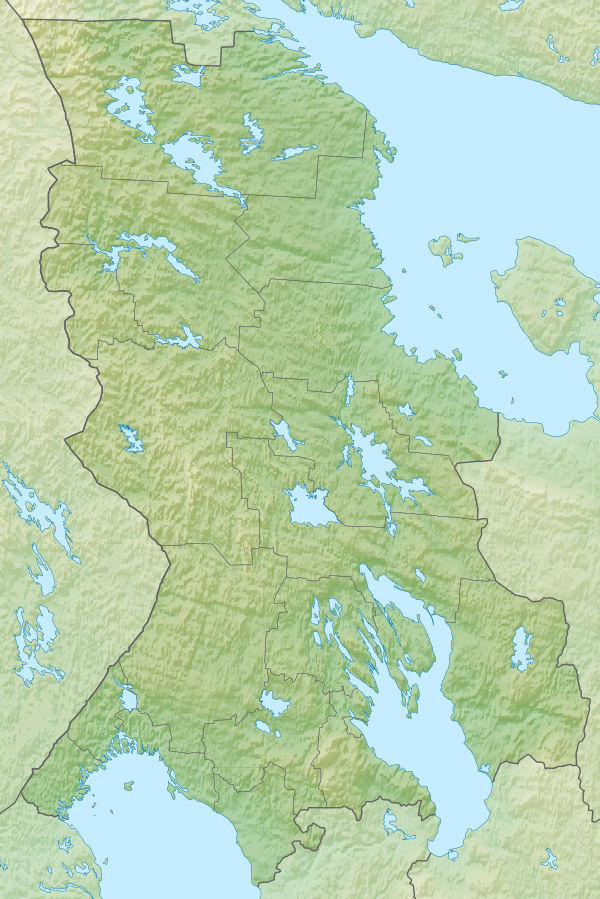
- Location within Finland Battle of Kuhmo (Karelia)

The Battle of Kuhmo was a series of skirmishes, mainly between January 28 and March 13, 1940, near the town of Kuhmo during the Soviet-Finnish Winter War. The 54th Soviet Rifle Division was encircled, but was able to hold out until the end of the war.

== Prelude ==
By conquering Northern Finland, the Soviet leadership wanted to occupy the entire Finnish state and cut off the traffic routes to its neighbors during the war. In order to support the advance of the 163rd Rifle Division and 44th Motorized Rifle Division on Oulu, the 54th Rifle Division was to advance south to cut off any routes for reinforcements from the Finnish heartland.

== Battle ==
After crossing the border, the 54th Division advanced towards Kuhmo. The Finnish army had only small border units stationed in this area, as an attack in northern Finland was not expected. On December 3, 1939, the Finnish High Command under Mannerheim was forced to send the 14th Independent Battalion to slow down the advance of the Soviet division. By New Year 1940, the Soviet units had moved within 15 kilometers of the village. There, the division was largely spared of attacks by the outnumbered enemy. The commander of the division, General Nikolai Gusevsky, used this pause to fortify his positions and even had a makeshift airfield built on a frozen lake. The division was in the form of an elongated column along the approach road to Kuhmo.

Following the Finnish successes in the Battle of Suomussalmi and Battle of Raate Road, Hjalmar Siilasvuo's 9th Division reached the Kuhmo area between 20 and 23 January, joining Regiment JR 25. On 28 January, Siilasvuo launched a counterattack against the Gusevski's 54th Division, and succeeded in severing the Soviet supply road with several mottis. On 30 January, Löytövaara was captured, trapping the Soviets along a 28-mile road between Rasti and the border for the remainder of the war.

The Soviets tried to relieve the surrounded units with a newly formed 1,800-man ski brigade and the deployment of the 23rd Rifle Division, but these attempts failed. The 54th Division was adequately supplied by the Soviet Air Force so that it was able to maintain its resistance until the armistice on March 13, 1940.

== Consequences ==
Finnish casualties were 1,340 dead, 3,123 wounded and 132 missing. The Soviet casualties were 2,118 dead, 3,732 wounded and 573 missing. The bodies of 720 Soviet soldiers were found in the area where Colonel Dolin's ski brigade had fought.

The assessment of the result of the battle is double: the Finns managed to block the Soviet advance, but their hope of being able to quickly repeat the success of the Battle of Suomussalmi and that of the Raate road, in order to then be able to transfer the 9th division to the crucial sector of the Isthmus of Karelia, was thwarted by strenuous Soviet resistance.

== See also ==
- List of Finnish military equipment of World War II
- List of Soviet Union military equipment of World War II

== Sources ==
=== English ===
- Chew, Allen (1971). The White Death: The Epic of the Soviet-Finnish Winter War. Michigan State University Press. ISBN 978-087-013-167-7.
