= Petola Visitor Centre =

Coordinates: 64°07′17.6″N 029°34′54.0″E

Kuhmo Visitor Centre Petola in Kuhmo, Finland was founded to provide information about large carnivores in Finland. The centre provides information about their appearance, behavior, habitats, research, monitoring and folk legends. Visiting the centre is free, excluding guided tours.

The permanent exhibition at the centre focuses on Finland's four large carnivores – bear, wolf, lynx and wolverine. Golden eagle and Finnish forest reindeer are also featured. Temporary exhibitions cover various other issues.

Customer service at the centre provides information about hiking, other outdoor activities, nature conservation and nature reserves in Kuhmo and Kainuu.
