= Jaakko Piirainen =

Finnish politician

Jaakko Piirainen (19 July 1871 – 12 July 1917) was a Finnish master carpenter and politician, born in Kuhmoniemi. He served as a Member of the Parliament of Finland from 1908 to 1909, representing the Social Democratic Party of Finland (SDP).
