= Hilja Gestrin =

Finnish architect (1882-1963)

- Born: April 28, 1882; Kuhmoniemi, Finland
- Died: September 14, 1963 (aged 81); Tampere
- Occupation: Architect
- Buildings: Tampere Art Museum

Hilja Ilma Gestrin (April 28, 1882 Kuhmoniemi – August 14, 1963 Tampere) was a Finnish architect. He designed the premises of the Tampere Art Museum in 1930. Hilja Kainulainen came from Kuhmoniemi (now Kuhmo) in Tuupala. His parents were merchant Petter Johan Kainulainen and housewife Helena Maria Kainulainen. Nine children were born to the couple. The family home is now a museum.

== Works ==
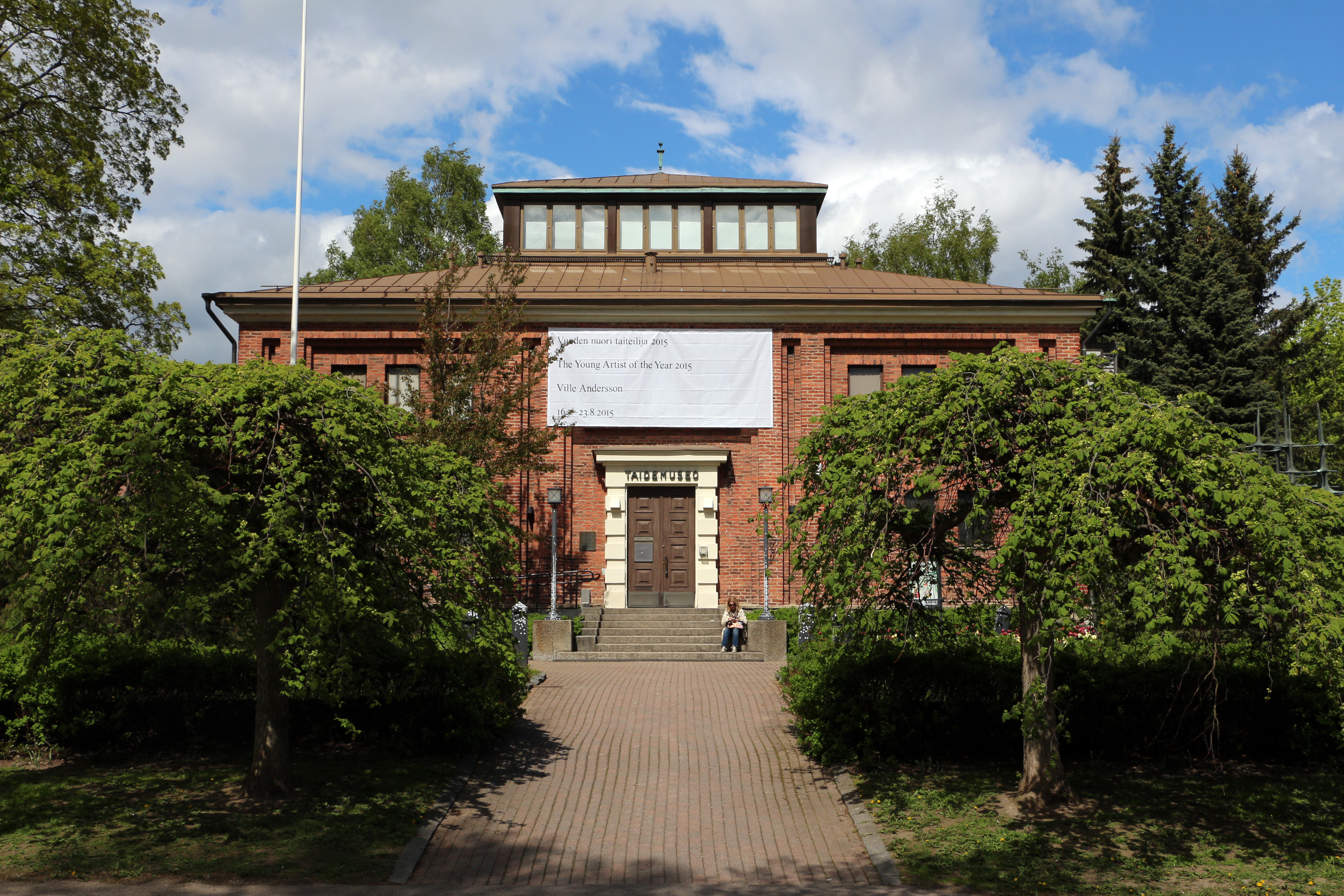
Tampere Art Museum in 2015.

Kainulainen went to school in Kuhmoniemi, after which he continued his studies in Kuopio. Kainulainen attended high school in Oulu and graduated in 1902. The following year, Kainulainen moved to Helsinki, where he began his architectural studies. At the University of Applied Sciences, his fellow students were e.g. Vietti Nykänen, Sigurd Savonius and Ivar Thomé. In addition to his architectural studies, Kainulainen participated in drawing and painting classes at the Ateneum and in the university lobby.

Kainulainen graduated as an architect with excellent grades ("diplomi") in 1907. After graduating, Kainulainen moved to Tampere. It became his permanent home town.

The newly graduated architect was immediately able to work in Tampere at Wivi Lönni's architectural office. Kainulainen worked as a draftsman and assisted Lönni, among other things, in the design of the Tampere fire station and Pispala prayer room. The competition drawings of the Tampere University of Economics and Business are possibly neatly drawn by Kainulainen. Lönn highly valued Kainulainen's work, as his office had accumulated a lot of work from 1907 to 1911. Lönn has said that he admires his conscientious and hardworking employee "extraordinarily". Kainulainen, on the other hand, has characterized Lönni as an inspiring employer who, in addition to being busy and demanding, also knew how to be humorous.

== Death ==
Gestrin died in Tampere in the summer of 1963. He is buried in the Gestrin family grave in Ikioma Areena. The family grave monument is made of black diorite and was designed by Hilja Gestrin.
