= Poyakonda =

Poyakonda Пояконда
- Inhabited locality
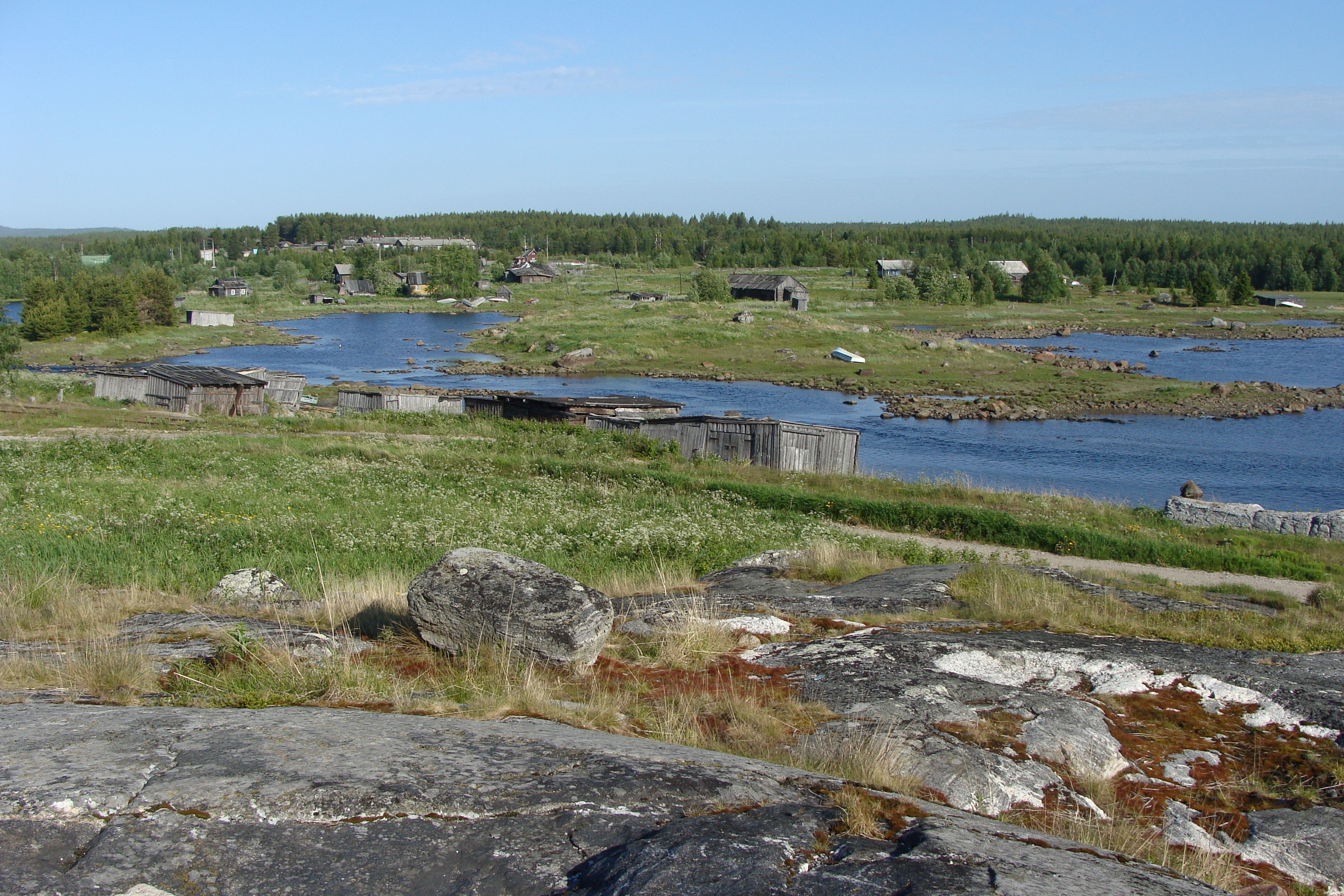
- Landscape of Poyakonda
- Interactive map of Poyakonda
- Location of Poyakonda Poyakonda (Murmansk Oblast)
- Coordinates: 66°35′38″N 32°48′56″E
- Country: Russia
- Federal subject: Murmansk Oblast
- Administrative district: Kandalakshsky District

Population (2010 Census)
  - Total: 78
  - Estimate (2021): 41 (−47.4%)
- Time zone: UTC+3 (MSK)
- Postal code: 184040
- Dialing code: +7 81533
- OKTMO ID: 47608158116

Poyakonda (Russian: Поя́конда) is a rural locality (an inhabited locality) in Kandalakshsky District of Murmansk Oblast, Russia, located beyond the Arctic Circle at a height of 6 meters (20 ft) above sea level.

On November 17, 1987, the Presidium of the Supreme Soviet of the Russian SFSR decreed to transfer the settlement of the railway station of Poyakonda from Tedinsky Selsoviet of Loukhsky District of the Karelian ASSR to Murmansk Oblast. By the Decision of the Murmansk Oblast Executive Committee of January 20, 1988, the settlement was merged with the inhabited locality of Poyakonda on the territory in jurisdiction of the town of Kandalaksha. The transfer marked the only time the external borders of Murmansk Oblast changed between 1947 and present.

As February 2018, the hamlet had 50 residents, most working at the White Sea Biological Station bioscience research facility run by the Moscow State University on the White Sea coast. In December 2017, Russian Railways removed the railway station from their Murmansk-St. Petersburg service. Services were resumed when it was realised a 14-year-old girl relied on the service to travel to school, which came to international attention.
