= Iso-Kiimanen =

- Location within Finland
- Coordinates: 64°7′N 28°36′E
- Type: Lake
- Catchment area: Oulujoki
- Basin countries: Finland
- Surface area: 30.792 km^{2} (11.889 sq mi)
- Average depth: 6.11 m (20.0 ft)
- Max. depth: 36 m (118 ft)
- Water volume: 0.118 km^{3} (96,000 acre⋅ft)
- Shore length^{1}: 101.22 km (62.90 mi)
- Surface elevation: 137.9 m (452 ft)
- Frozen: November–April
- Islands: Saijansaari, Katajasaari
- ^{1} Shore length is not a well-defined measure.

Iso-Kiimanen is a lake of Finland in the Oulujoki main catchment area. It is located in Sotkamo municipality in Kainuu region.

== See also ==
- List of lakes in Finland
