= Lammasjärvi =

Lake in Kuhmo, Finland

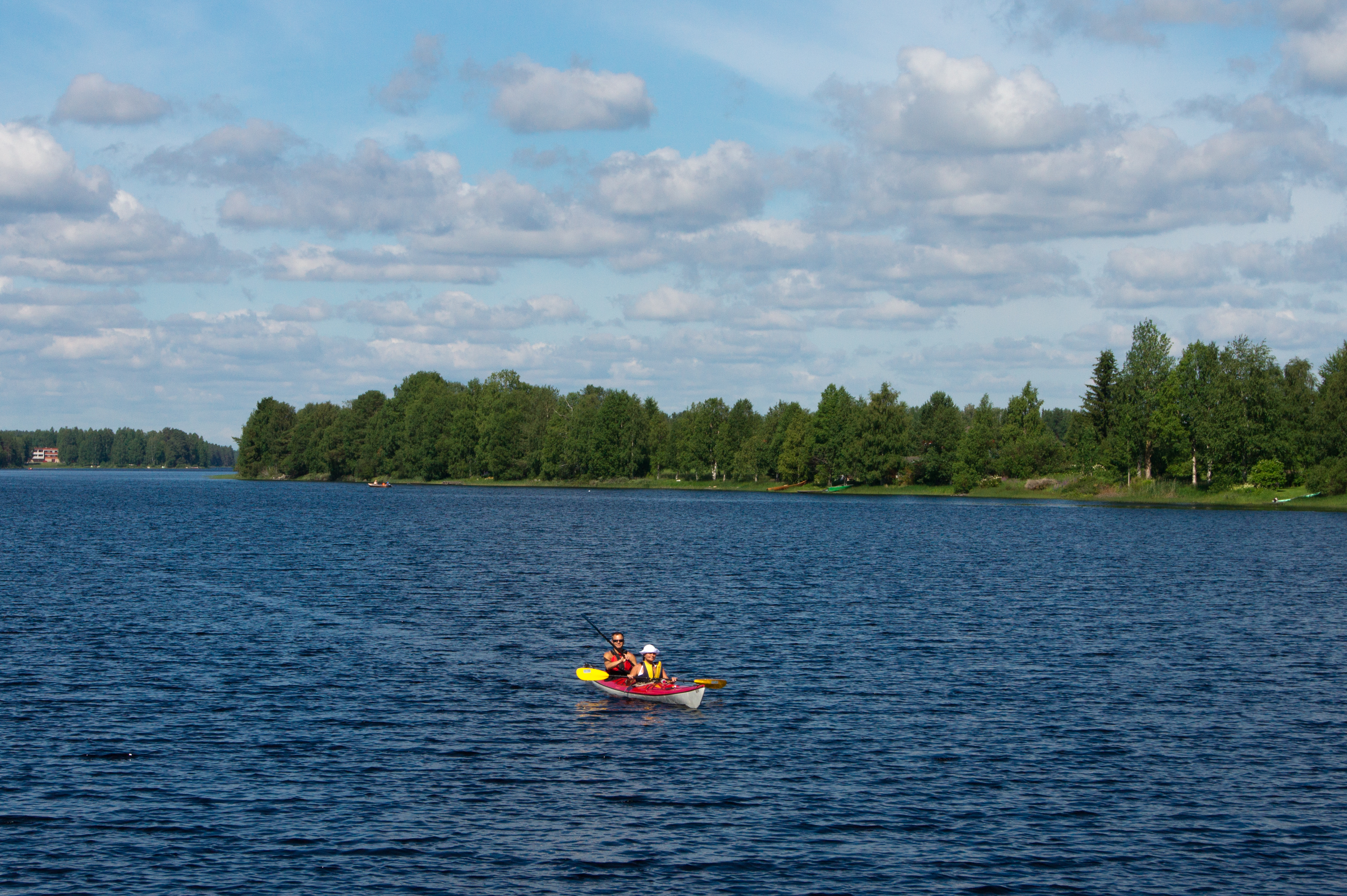

- Location within Finland
- Location: Kuhmo
- Coordinates: 64°05′N 029°43′E
- Primary inflows: Lentuankoski
- Primary outflows: Pajakkajoki
- Catchment area: Oulujoki
- Basin countries: Finland
- Surface area: 46.816 km^{2} (18.076 sq mi)
- Average depth: 4.32 m (14.2 ft)
- Max. depth: 21 m (69 ft)
- Water volume: 0.202 km^{3} (164,000 acre⋅ft)
- Shore length^{1}: 219.23 km (136.22 mi)
- Surface elevation: 162.6 m (533 ft)
- Frozen: December–May
- Islands: Mantereensaari, Likosaari
- Settlements: Kuhmo
- ^{1} Shore length is not a well-defined measure.

Lammasjärvi is a medium-sized lake in the Oulujoki main catchment area. It is located in the Kainuu region, Kuhmo municipality in Finland.

== See also ==
- List of lakes in Finland
