= Kalevalsky District =

Kalevalsky District Калевальский район (Russian)
- District
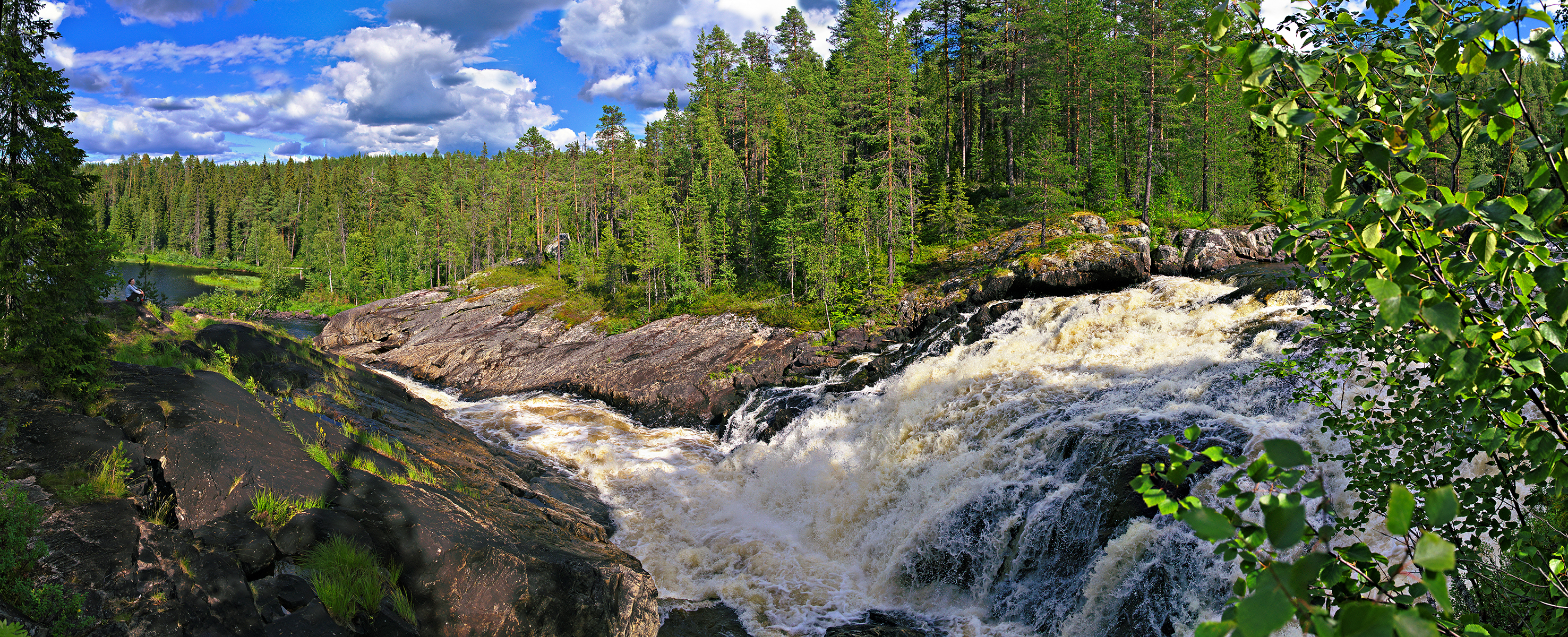
- A waterfall in Voynitsa protected area, Kalevalsky District

- Flag Coat of arms
- Location of Kalevalsky District in the Republic of Karelia
- Coordinates: 65°12′N 31°10′E
- Country: Russia
- Federal subject: Republic of Karelia
- Administrative center: Kalevala

Area
  - Total: 13,316 km^{2} (5,141 sq mi)

Population (2010 Census)
  - Total: 8,321
  - Density: 0.6249/km^{2} (1.618/sq mi)
  - Urban: 54.4%
  - Rural: 45.6%

Administrative structure
  - Inhabited localities: 1 urban-type settlements, 8 rural localities

Municipal structure
  - Municipally incorporated as: Kalevalsky Municipal District
  - Municipal divisions: 1 urban settlements, 3 rural settlements
- Time zone: UTC+3 (UTC+03:00)
- OKTMO ID: 86609000
- Website: http://visitkalevala.ru

Population of Kalevalsky District
- 2010 Census: 8,321
- 2002 Census: 10,628
- 1989 Census: 11,860
- 1979 Census: 17,155

Kalevalsky District (Russian: Ка́левальский райо́н; Karelian: Kalevalan piiri) is an administrative district (raion), one of the fifteen in the Republic of Karelia, Russia. It is located in the northwest of the republic and borders with Finland in the west, Loukhsky District in the north, Kemsky and Muyezersky Districts in the east, and with the territory of the town of republic significance of Kostomuksha in the south. The area of the district is 13,316 square kilometers (5,141 sq mi). Its administrative center is the urban locality (an urban-type settlement) of Kalevala. As of the 2010 Census, the total population of the district was 8,321, with the population of Kalevala accounting for 54.4% of that number.

== Geography ==
There are many lakes within the district, and wetlands account for 30% of the district's territory. Natural resources include molybdenum, iron ore, quartzite, copper, and peat.

== Administrative and municipal status ==
Within the framework of administrative divisions, Kalevalsky District is one of the fifteen in the Republic of Karelia and has administrative jurisdiction over one urban-type settlement (Kalevala) and eight rural localities. As a municipal division, the district is incorporated as Kalevalsky Municipal District. The urban-type settlement of Kalevala and one rural locality (the settlement of Kuusiniemi) are incorporated into an urban settlement, while the remaining seven rural localities are incorporated into three rural settlements within the municipal district. The urban-type settlement of Kalevala serves as the administrative center of both the administrative and municipal district.

== Demographics ==
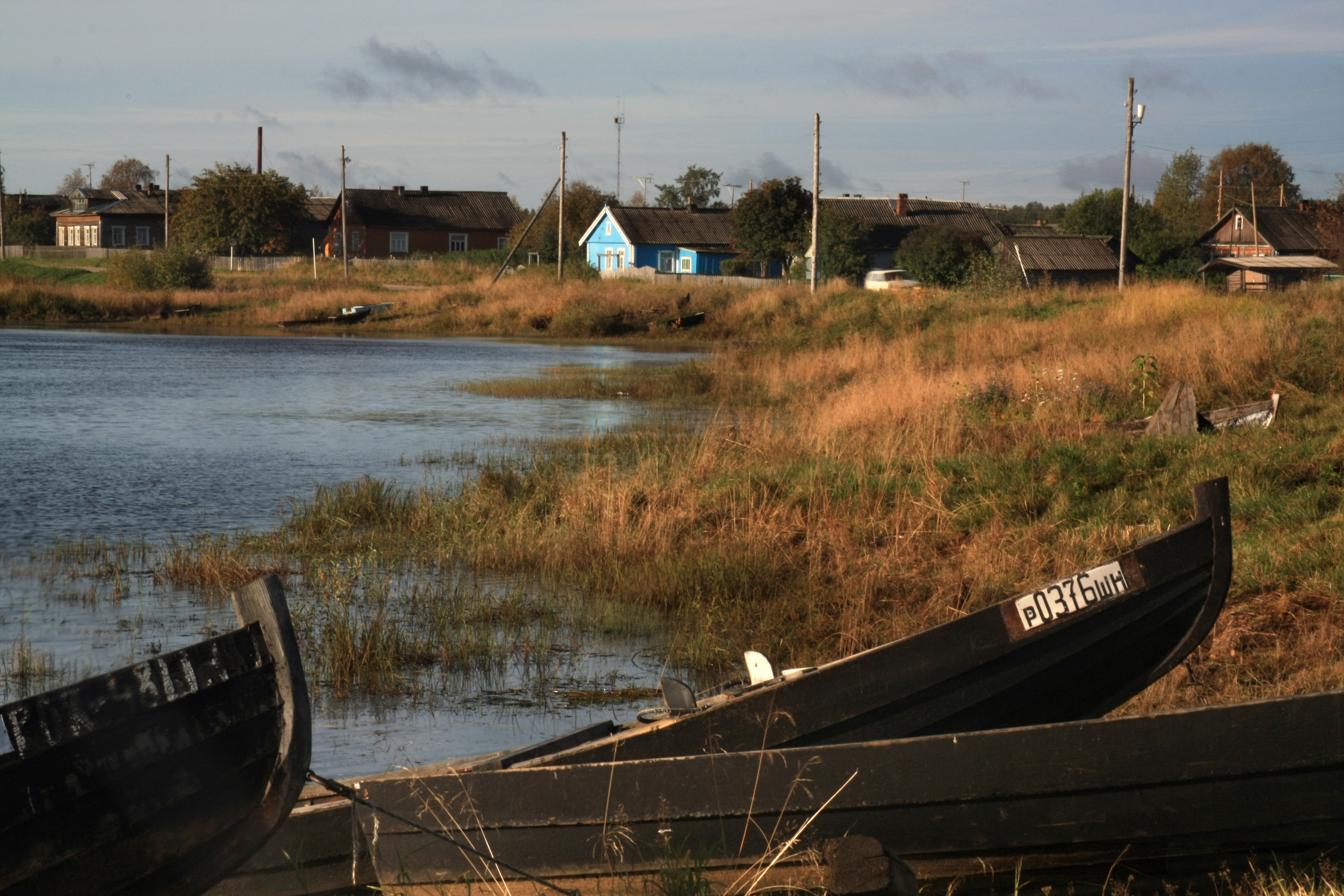
Karelian folk boats in the village of Yushkozero, Kalevalsky District

As of the 2002 Census, the district's ethnic composition was as follows:

- Russians: 46.3%
- Karelians: 35.9%
- Belarusians: 9.8%
- Ukrainians: 3.2%
- Other ethnicities: 4.7%
