= Kalevala, Russia =

Kalevala Калевала Kalevala (Karelian)
- Urban-type settlement
- Flag Coat of arms
- Interactive map of Kalevala
- Location of Kalevala Kalevala (Karelia)
- Coordinates: 65°13′N 31°11′E
- Country: Russia
- Federal subject: Republic of Karelia
- Administrative district: Kalevalsky District
- Founded: 1552 (Julian)

Population (2010 Census)
  - Total: 4,529
  - Estimate (2025): 3,352 (−26%)

Administrative status
  - Capital of: Kalevalsky District

Municipal status
  - Municipal district: Kalevalsky Municipal District
  - Urban settlement: Kalevalskoye Urban Settlement
  - Capital of: Kalevalsky Municipal District, Kalevalskoye Urban Settlement
- Time zone: UTC+3 (UTC+03:00)
- Postal code: 186910
- OKTMO ID: 86609151051
- Website: kalevala-mo.ru

Kalevala population
- 2010 Census: 4,529
- 2002 Census: 5,578
- 1989 Census: 5,150
- 1979 Census: 4,834

Kalevala (Russian: Калевала; Karelian: Kalevala) is an urban locality (an urban-type settlement) and the administrative center of Kalevalsky District in the Republic of Karelia, Russia. As of the 2010 Census, its population was 4,529.

== Name ==
The locality was named Ukhta (Russian: Ухта; Karelian: Uhtuo ) until 1963, when it was renamed after the Finnish epic Kalevala, which was partially based on the oral poems collected from Ukhta and the surrounding region.

The administrative Ukhtinsky District had been renamed Kalevalsky District in 1935 for the centennial of the Old Kalevala. When the Loukhsky, Kestengsky and Kalevalsky Districts were merged into the Kemsky district in 1963, the name Kalevala was transferred to the locality. The Loukhsky and Kalevalsky Districts were re-established already in 1965, but the locality retained its new official name.

== Administrative and municipal status ==
Within the framework of administrative divisions, Kalevala serves as the administrative center of Kalevalsky District. As a municipal division, Kalevala, together with one rural locality (the settlement of Kuusiniyemi) is incorporated within Kalevalsky Municipal District as Kalevalskoye Urban Settlement.

== Climate ==
Kalevala has a subarctic climate. Its climate is somewhat tempered by its relative proximity to mild marine areas, ensuring winters that are more habitable than areas at the same latitude. However, in spite of this, the winter season is dominant and summers are short and cool.

Climate data for Kalevala (extremes 1936-present)
Month	Jan	Feb	Mar	Apr	May	Jun	Jul	Aug	Sep	Oct	Nov	Dec	Year
Record high °C (°F)	8.5 (47.3)	7.3 (45.1)	12.1 (53.8)	20.9 (69.6)	28.8 (83.8)	31.8 (89.2)	33.2 (91.8)	31.9 (89.4)	24.6 (76.3)	18.0 (64.4)	10.2 (50.4)	6.2 (43.2)	33.2 (91.8)
Mean daily maximum °C (°F)	−7.9 (17.8)	−7.5 (18.5)	−3.3 (26.1)	3.2 (37.8)	10.5 (50.9)	16.6 (61.9)	20.2 (68.4)	17.2 (63.0)	11.7 (53.1)	4.1 (39.4)	−1.1 (30.0)	−4.5 (23.9)	4.9 (40.9)
Daily mean °C (°F)	−9.8 (14.4)	−9.3 (15.3)	−5.5 (22.1)	0.2 (32.4)	6.6 (43.9)	13.1 (55.6)	16.8 (62.2)	14.2 (57.6)	9.3 (48.7)	2.6 (36.7)	−2.5 (27.5)	−6.4 (20.5)	2.4 (36.4)
Mean daily minimum °C (°F)	−12.0 (10.4)	−11.4 (11.5)	−7.9 (17.8)	−2.9 (26.8)	2.3 (36.1)	8.7 (47.7)	12.9 (55.2)	11.1 (52.0)	6.8 (44.2)	1.1 (34.0)	−4.0 (24.8)	−8.3 (17.1)	−0.3 (31.5)
Record low °C (°F)	−45.1 (−49.2)	−44.6 (−48.3)	−38.4 (−37.1)	−29.1 (−20.4)	−16.3 (2.7)	−4.1 (24.6)	−0.9 (30.4)	−5.2 (22.6)	−8.9 (16.0)	−24.7 (−12.5)	−34.1 (−29.4)	−38.7 (−37.7)	−45.1 (−49.2)
Average precipitation mm (inches)	40 (1.6)	34 (1.3)	35 (1.4)	36 (1.4)	60 (2.4)	74 (2.9)	90 (3.5)	84 (3.3)	67 (2.6)	60 (2.4)	53 (2.1)	48 (1.9)	681 (26.8)
Source 1: http://en.climate-data.org/location/8458/
Source 2: https://www.pogodaiklimat.ru/monitor.php?id=22408 (record highs and lows)
