= Pyaozersky =

Pyaozersky Пяозерский Piäjärvi (Karelian)
- Urban-type settlement
- Flag Coat of arms
- Interactive map of Pyaozersky
- Location of Pyaozersky Pyaozersky (Karelia)
- Coordinates: 65°46′N 31°05′E
- Country: Russia
- Federal subject: Republic of Karelia
- Administrative district: Loukhsky District
- Founded: 1973
- Urban-type settlement status since: 1976

Population (2010 Census)
  - Total: 2,098
  - Estimate (2025): 1,513 (−27.9%)

Municipal status
  - Municipal district: Loukhsky Municipal District
  - Urban settlement: Pyaozerskoye Urban Settlement
  - Capital of: Pyaozerskoye Urban Settlement
- Time zone: UTC+3 (UTC+03:00)
- Postal code: 186667
- OKTMO ID: 86621162051
- Website: pyaozero-admin.ru

Pyaozersky population
- 2010 Census: 2,098
- 2002 Census: 2,603
- 1989 Census: 2,632
- 1979 Census: 2,660

Pyaozersky (Russian: Пяозе́рский; Karelian: Piäjärvi; Finnish: Pääjärvi) is an urban locality (an urban-type settlement) in Loukhsky District of the Republic of Karelia, Russia, located on the shore of Lake Pyaozero, 700 kilometers (430 mi) northwest of Petrozavodsk, the capital of the republic. As of the 2010 Census, its population was 2,098.

== History ==
Urban-type settlement status was granted to it in 1976.

== Administrative and municipal status ==
Within the framework of administrative divisions, the urban-type settlement of Pyaozersky is subordinated to Loukhsky District. As a municipal division, Pyaozersky is incorporated within Loukhsky Municipal District as Pyaozerskoye Urban Settlement.
