= Loukhi =

Loukhi Лоухи Louhi (Karelian)
- Urban-type settlement
- Flag Coat of arms
- Interactive map of Loukhi
- Location of Loukhi Loukhi (Karelia)
- Coordinates: 66°04′N 33°04′E
- Country: Russia
- Federal subject: Republic of Karelia
- Administrative district: Loukhsky District
- Founded: 1912–1914
- Urban-type settlement status since: 1944

Population (2010 Census)
  - Total: 4,772
  - Estimate (2025): 3,529 (−26%)

Administrative status
  - Capital of: Loukhsky District

Municipal status
  - Municipal district: Loukhsky Municipal District
  - Urban settlement: Loukhskoye Urban Settlement
  - Capital of: Loukhsky Municipal District, Loukhskoye Urban Settlement
- Time zone: UTC+3 (UTC+03:00)
- Postal code: 186660
- OKTMO ID: 86621151051
- Website: louhigor.ru

Loukhi population
- 2010 Census: 4,772
- 2002 Census: 5,920
- 1989 Census: 6,405
- 1979 Census: 5,548

Loukhi (Russian: Лоухи; Karelian: Louhi) is an urban locality (an urban-type settlement) and the administrative center of Loukhsky District in the Republic of Karelia, Russia, located on the shore of Lake Panovo, 500 kilometers (310 mi) north of Petrozavodsk, the capital of the republic. As of the 2010 Census, its population was 4,772.

== History ==
It was founded in 1912–1914 due to the construction of a railroad. Urban-type settlement status was granted to it in 1944.

In 1978, Korean Air Lines Flight 902 was forced to land at the nearby Lake Korpijärvi after being attacked by Soviet aircraft.

== Administrative and municipal status ==
Within the framework of administrative divisions, Loukhi serves as the administrative center of Loukhsky District, of which it is a part. As a municipal division, Loukhi is incorporated within Loukhsky Municipal District as Loukhskoye Urban Settlement.
