= Lentua =

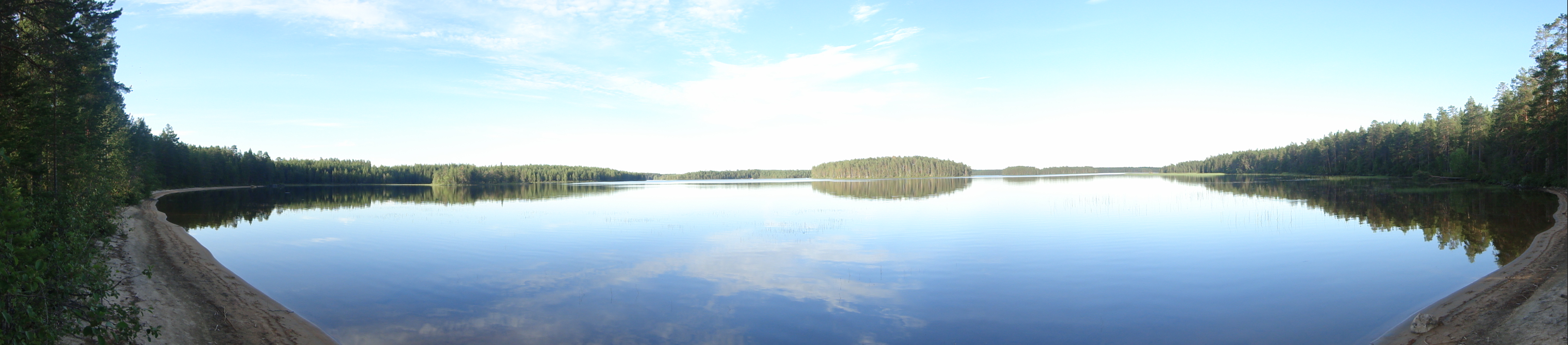
- Panorama of beach and island in Lentua.

- Location within Finland
- Location: Kuhmo
- Coordinates: 64°14′N 029°36′E
- Type: Lake
- Primary inflows: Isojoki, Iivantiira, Kalliojoki
- Primary outflows: Lentuankoski
- Basin countries: Finland
- Surface area: 77.842 km^{2} (30.055 sq mi)
- Average depth: 7.41 m (24.3 ft)
- Max. depth: 52 m (171 ft)
- Water volume: 0.582 km^{3} (472,000 acre⋅ft)
- Shore length^{1}: 271.41 km (168.65 mi)
- Surface elevation: 167.9 m (551 ft)
- Frozen: November–May
- Islands: Kotasaari, Salonsaari
- ^{1} Shore length is not a well-defined measure.

Lentua is a medium-sized lake of Finland and it is the 57th biggest lake in Finland. It belongs to Oulujoki main catchment area and it is situated in Kuhmo municipality in the Kainuu region. There is a route around the lake for paddlers.

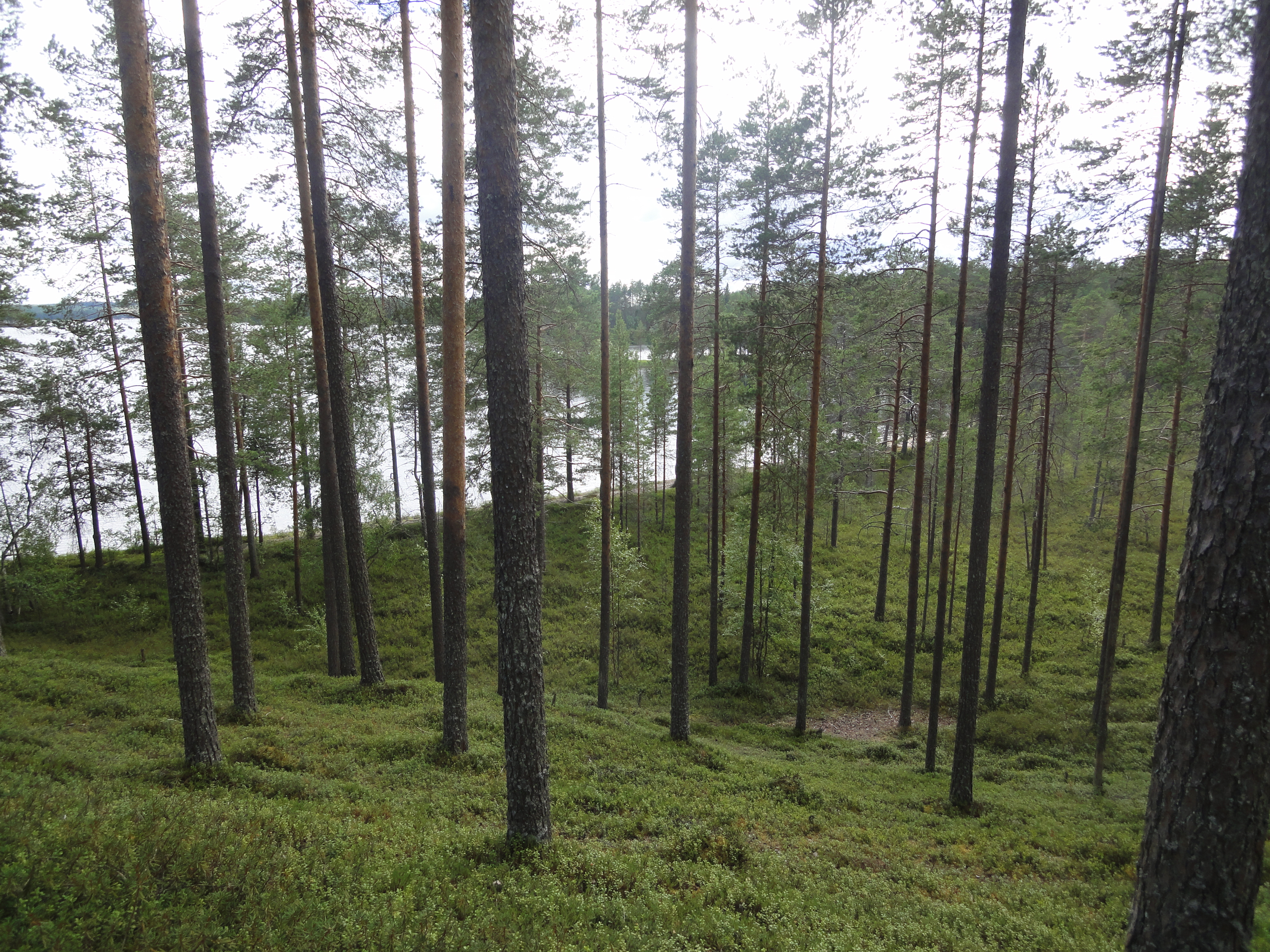
Protected forest and eskers.

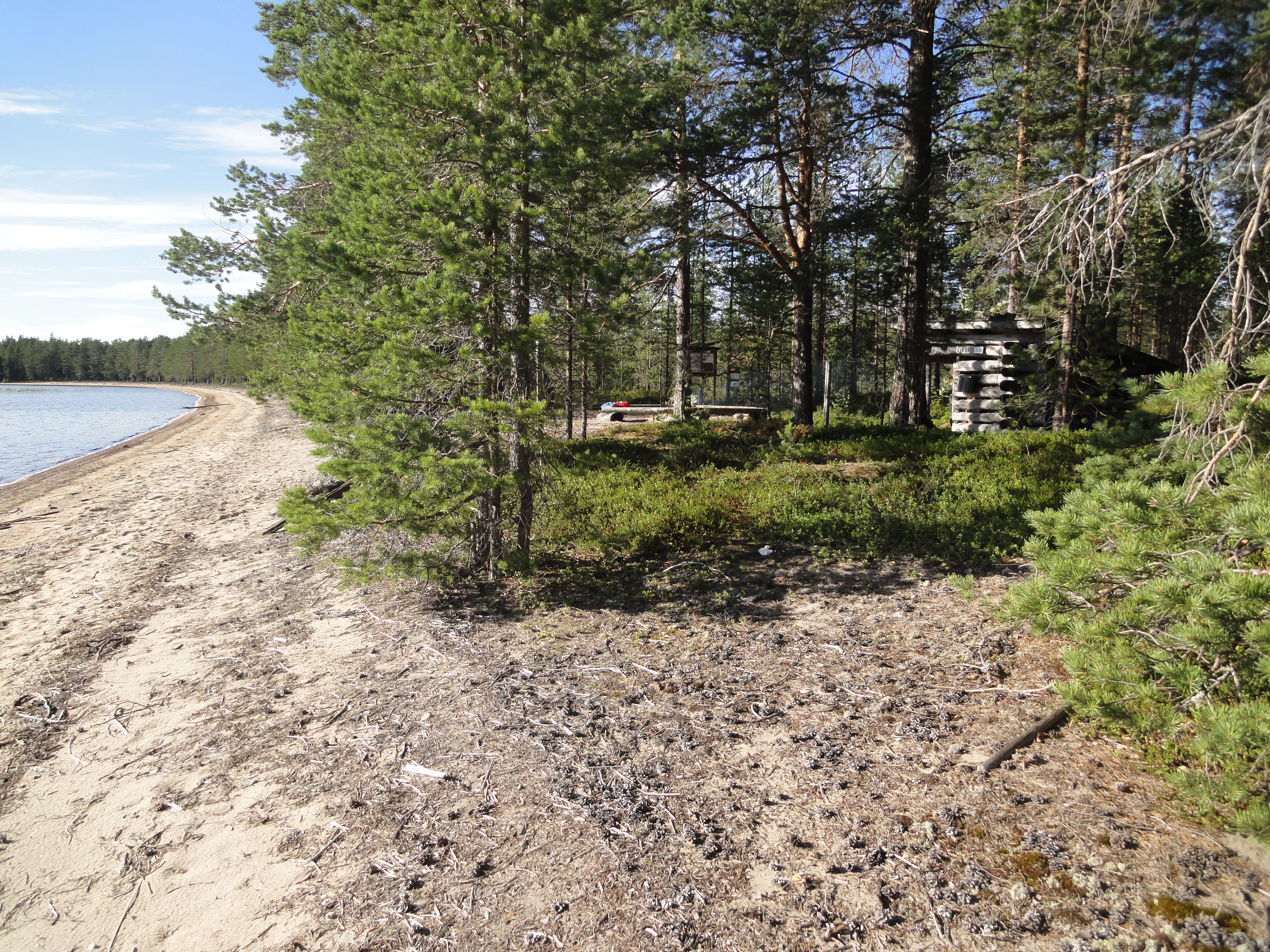
Lagoon-style beach on an island.

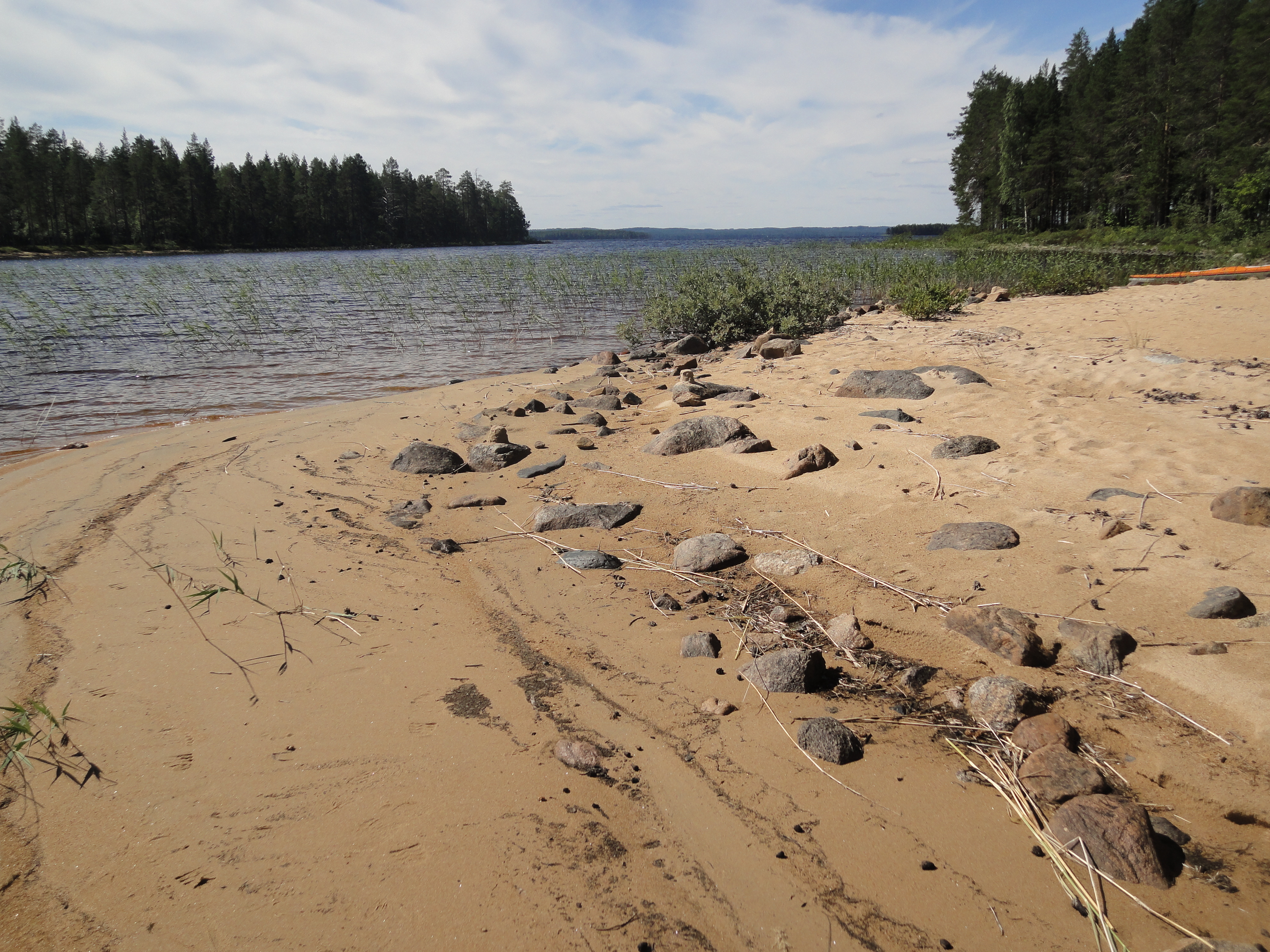
Rocky beach.

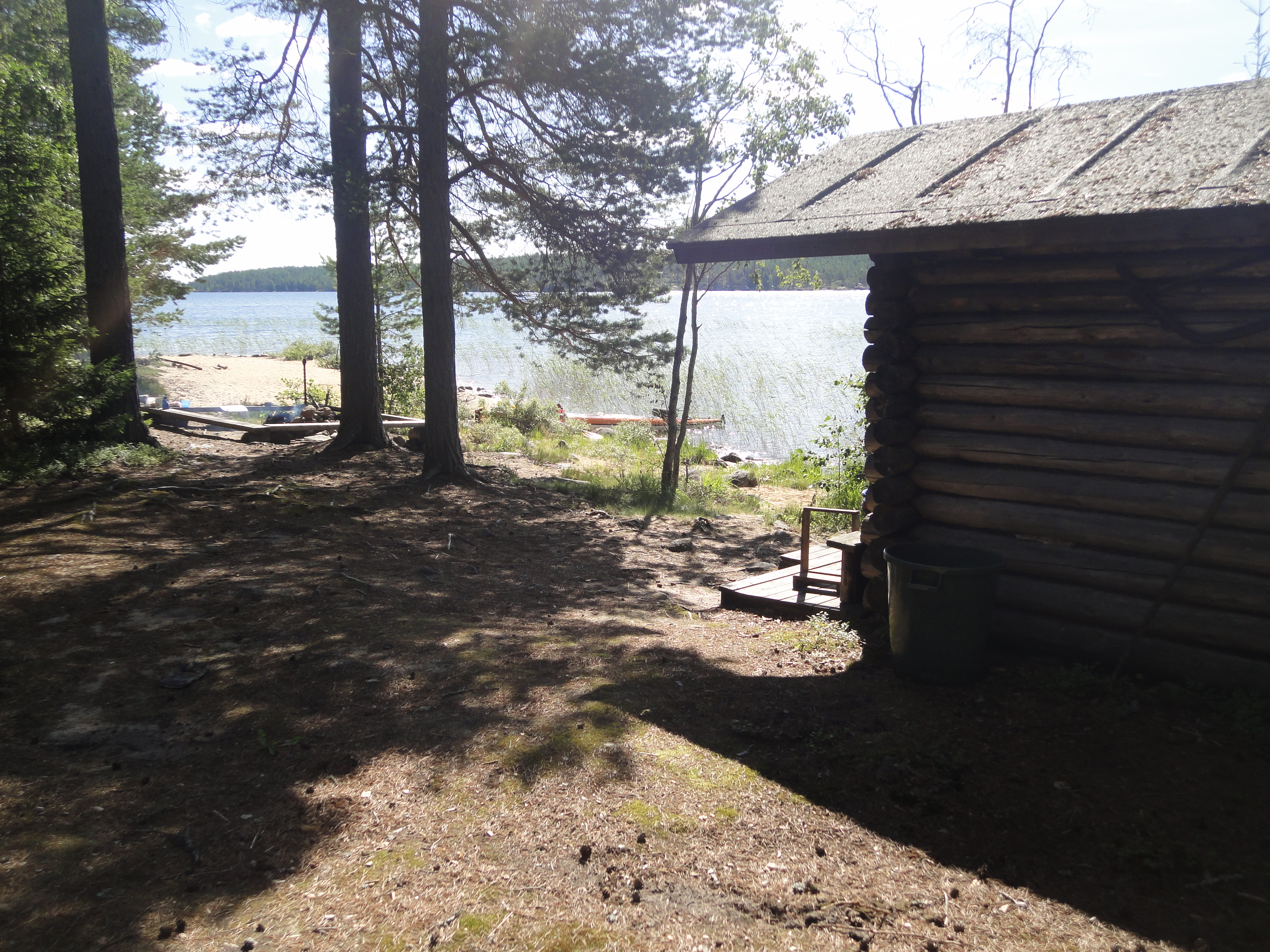
Public cottage on an island.

== See also ==
- List of lakes in Finland
