= Chupa, Republic of Karelia =

Chupa Чупа Čuuppa (Karelian)
- Urban-type settlement
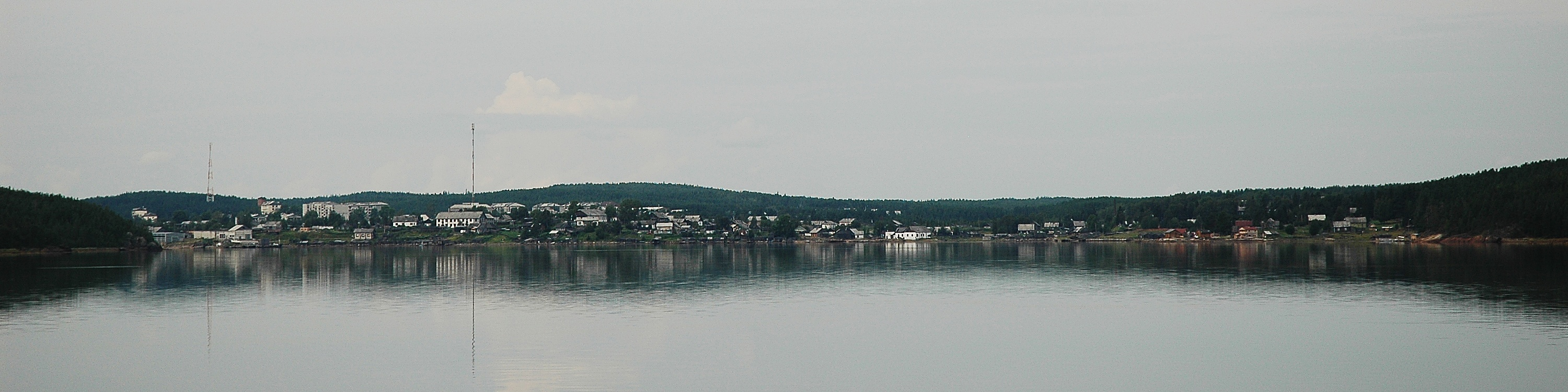
- Chupa as seen from the gulf of Chupa (southern coast of the Kandalaksha Gulf)

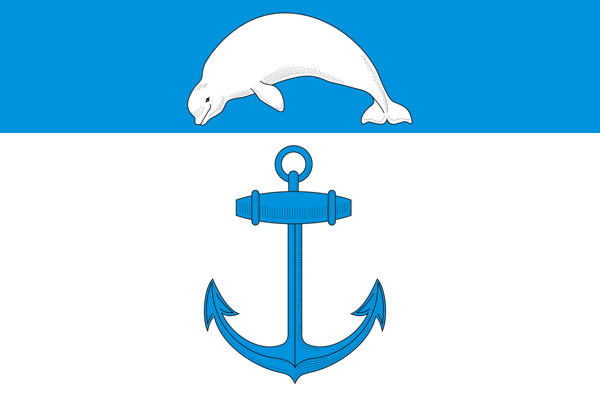
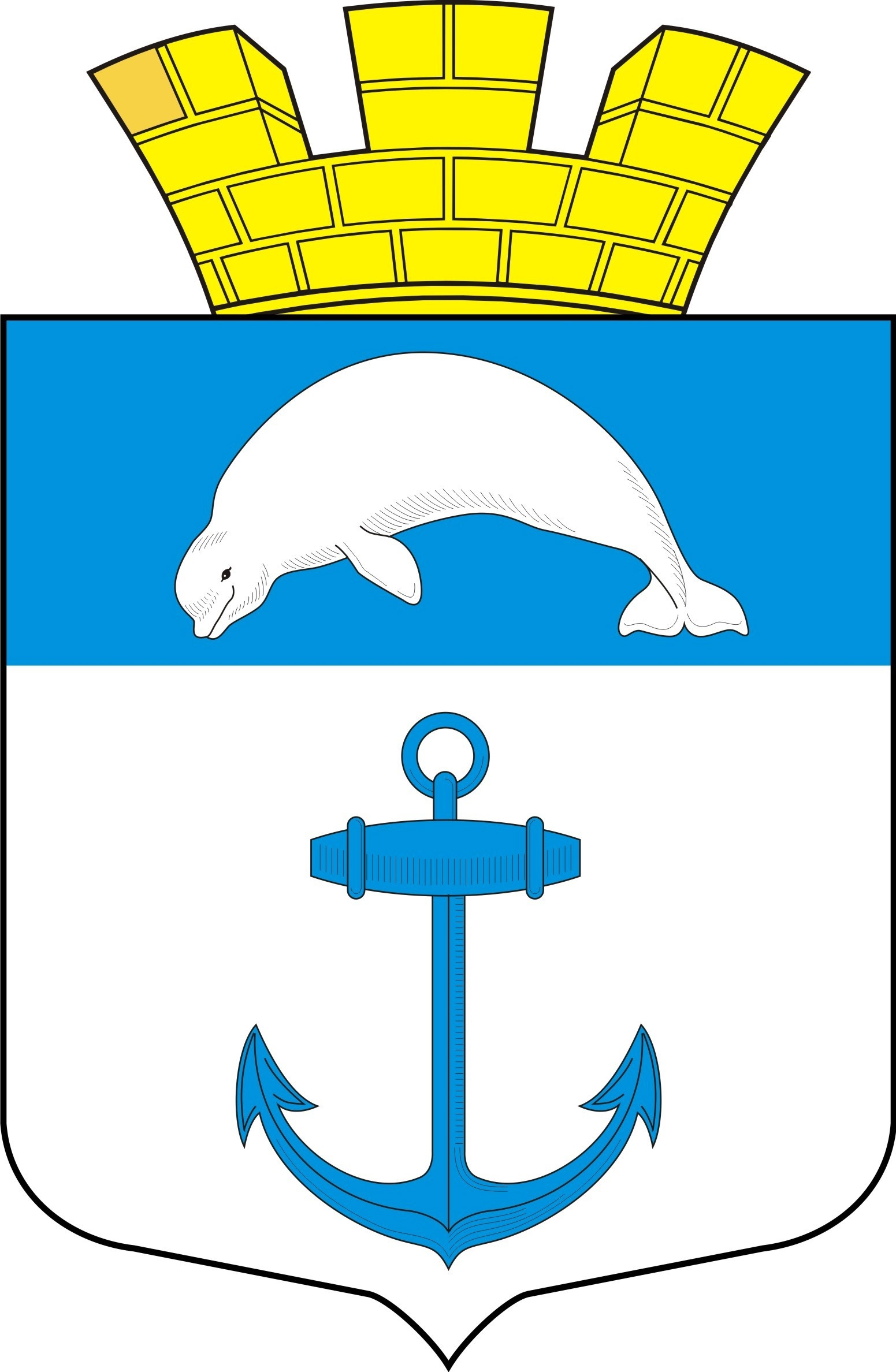
- Flag Coat of arms
- Interactive map of Chupa
- Location of Chupa Chupa (Karelia)
- Coordinates: 66°17′N 33°04′E
- Country: Russia
- Federal subject: Republic of Karelia
- Administrative district: Loukhsky District
- Known since: 1574
- Urban-type settlement status since: 1943

Population (2010 Census)
  - Total: 2,924
  - Estimate (2025): 1,973 (−32.5%)

Municipal status
  - Municipal district: Loukhsky Municipal District
  - Urban settlement: Chupinskoye Urban Settlement
  - Capital of: Chupinskoye Urban Settlement
- Time zone: UTC+3 (UTC+03:00)
- Postal code: 186670
- OKTMO ID: 86621170051

Chupa population
- 2010 Census: 2,924
- 2002 Census: 4,061
- 1989 Census: 5,214
- 1979 Census: 4,904

Chupa (Russian: Чу́па; Karelian: Čuuppa) is an urban locality (an urban-type settlement) in Loukhsky District of the Republic of Karelia, Russia, located on the coast of the White Sea, 629 kilometers (391 mi) north of Petrozavodsk, the capital of the republic. As of the 2010 Census, its population was 2,924.

== History ==
It has been known since 1574. Urban-type settlement status was granted to it in 1943.

== Administrative and municipal status ==
Within the framework of administrative divisions, the urban-type settlement of Chupa is subordinated to Loukhsky District. As a municipal division, Chupa, together with one rural locality (the station of Chupa), is incorporated within Loukhsky Municipal District as Chupinskoye Urban Settlement.
