= Kuhmo =

- Town
- Kuhmon kaupunki Kuhmo stad
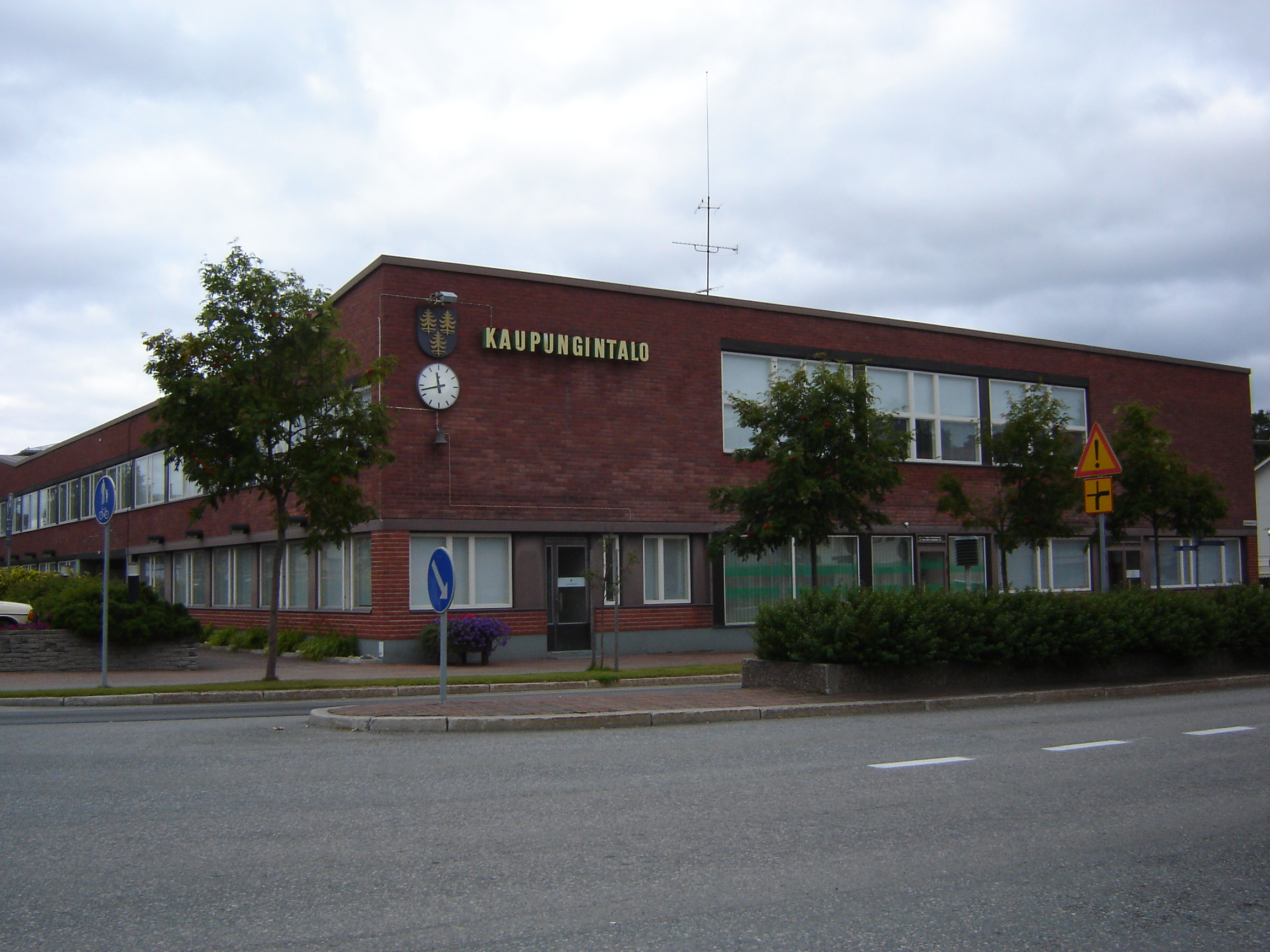
- Kuhmo Town hall

- Coat of arms

- Interactive map of Kuhmo
- Coordinates: 64°07.5′N 029°31′E
- Country: Finland
- Region: Kainuu
- Sub-region: Kehys-Kainuu
- Charter: 1865
- City rights: 1986

Government
  - Town Manager: Juhana Juntunen

Area (2018-01-01)
  - Total: 5,456.78 km^{2} (2,106.87 sq mi)
  - Land: 4,807.07 km^{2} (1,856.02 sq mi)
  - Water: 649.97 km^{2} (250.95 sq mi)
  - Rank: 12th largest in Finland

Population (2025-12-31)
  - Total: 7,300
  - Rank: 126th largest in Finland
  - Density: 1.52/km^{2} (3.9/sq mi)
  - Finnish: 96.4% (official)
  - Others: 3.6%

Population by age
  - 0 to 14: 10.8%
  - 15 to 64: 51.5%
  - 65 or older: 37.6%
- Time zone: UTC+02:00 (EET)
  - Summer (DST): UTC+03:00 (EEST)
- Website: www.kuhmo.fi

Kuhmo (known as Kuhmoniemi until 1937) is a town and a municipality in Finland and is located at the south-eastern corner of the Kainuu region. The municipality has a population of 7,300 (31 December 2025) and covers an area of 5,456.78 square kilometres (2,106.87 sq mi) of which 649.97 km^{2} (250.95 sq mi) is water. The population density is 1.52 inhabitants per square kilometre (3.9/sq mi). It shares a border of 120 kilometres (75 mi) with Russia (Finnish-Russian border). Neighbouring towns are Hyrynsalmi, Lieksa, Nurmes, Ristijärvi, Sotkamo and Suomussalmi. A neighbour city across the Russian border is Kostomuksha. Vartius, one of the border crossing points between Finland and Russia, is located in northern Kuhmo.

Kuhmo's eastern border is located at a drainage divider, and the town area is within the drainage basin of Oulujärvi.

The municipality is unilingually Finnish.

== History ==
The first inhabitants arrived in Kuhmo after the last ice-age, around 8000 BCE. Proof of Stone Age habitation has been found around Ontojärvi and Lammasjärvi. Sami people inhabited Kuhmo area until migration from Karelia and Savonia pushed Sami people up north. The influence of Sami culture is still found in the placenames. Wide spreading water routes are known to have attracted hunters, raiders, merchants and tax collectors since the 9th century.

In the Treaty of Nöteborg, the settlement between Sweden and the Novgorod Republic on August 12, 1323, the Kuhmo area belonged to Novgorod. Yet hunters and tax collectors kept on penetrating to the area from west. Swedish interest was to push the border further east.

Permanent habitation settled to the area after Gustav I, king of Sweden, had promised tax relief to peasants who would move north. Almost all the habitation was destroyed in the Russo-Swedish war between 1570 and 1595. In the Treaty of Teusina, the region of Kuhmo was annexed into Sweden. In the following centuries, this area was continuously raided in a number of wars and quarrels.

In 1809, Finland was annexed from Sweden to the Russian Empire as the Grand Duchy of Finland. For merchants from Karelia and Russia, Kuhmo became a trade route and a place to sell their goods. As a memorial of those merchants, on the market of Kuhmo there stands the statue “Laukunkantaja” (in English, "The Bag Bearer"). In this era, Elias Lönnrot, compiler of the Finnish National Epic Kalevala made his poem-collecting trips via Kuhmo to Karelia. Lönnrot made some of the editing in Kuhmo. Reconstruction of the hut where he has staying can be seen in the Kalevala village. Publishing Kalevala in 1835 fueled birth of Karelianism, which became a major trend in culture spheres towards the end of 19th century. Akseli Gallen-Kallela, who is considered one of the founders of Karelianism, spent his honeymoon in Kuhmo. During their stay Gallen-Kallela painted some of his works at Lapinsalmi, lake Lentua. Scenery to lake Lentua based the background of the middle picture in his work Aino triptych.

During the 19th century burn-beating was still essential in agriculture but in decline. At the end of 18th century tar production had arrived to the area as a new and steadily growing source of income. In the year 1900 tar production in Kuhmo was highest in Finland, at 1.6 million litres. Tar was shipped from Kuhmo to Oulu by rowboats. Largest boats could carry 25 – 27 barrels, 125 litres each. Remains of tar pits, where tar was distilled from pine, can be found everywhere in the Kuhmo area.

The village of Jonkeri and its surroundings near Lake Jonkeri were transferred from Nurmeksen maalaiskunta to Kuhmo in 1903.

The Winter War was an important event in the history of Kuhmo. During the war Kuhmo was bombarded 48 times and ground battles took place as near as ten kilometers from the center of the town. The Soviet army´s objective in Kuhmo was to proceed through Kuhmo and Kajaani to Oulu and divide Finland into two. The offensive was stopped on the Kuhmo – Saunajärvi road at Jyrkänkoski and on the Kuhmo – Kiekinkoski road at Tyrävaara, Both battlescenes are approximately 10 km from the city center. At narrow Kuhmo (Saunajärvi road) the Soviet 54th Division was forced to spread its troops which made Finnish guerilla tactics efficient. After being stopped, Soviet forces were divided and encircled into small pockets. A campaign to destroy the pockets and prevent the Soviet 44th Division from rescuing encircled forces continued until the Moscow peace treaty. After the war Kuhmo kept its eastern borderline unchanged, thus having an unchanged borderline for 400 years straight since the Treaty of Teusina of 1595.

== Geography ==
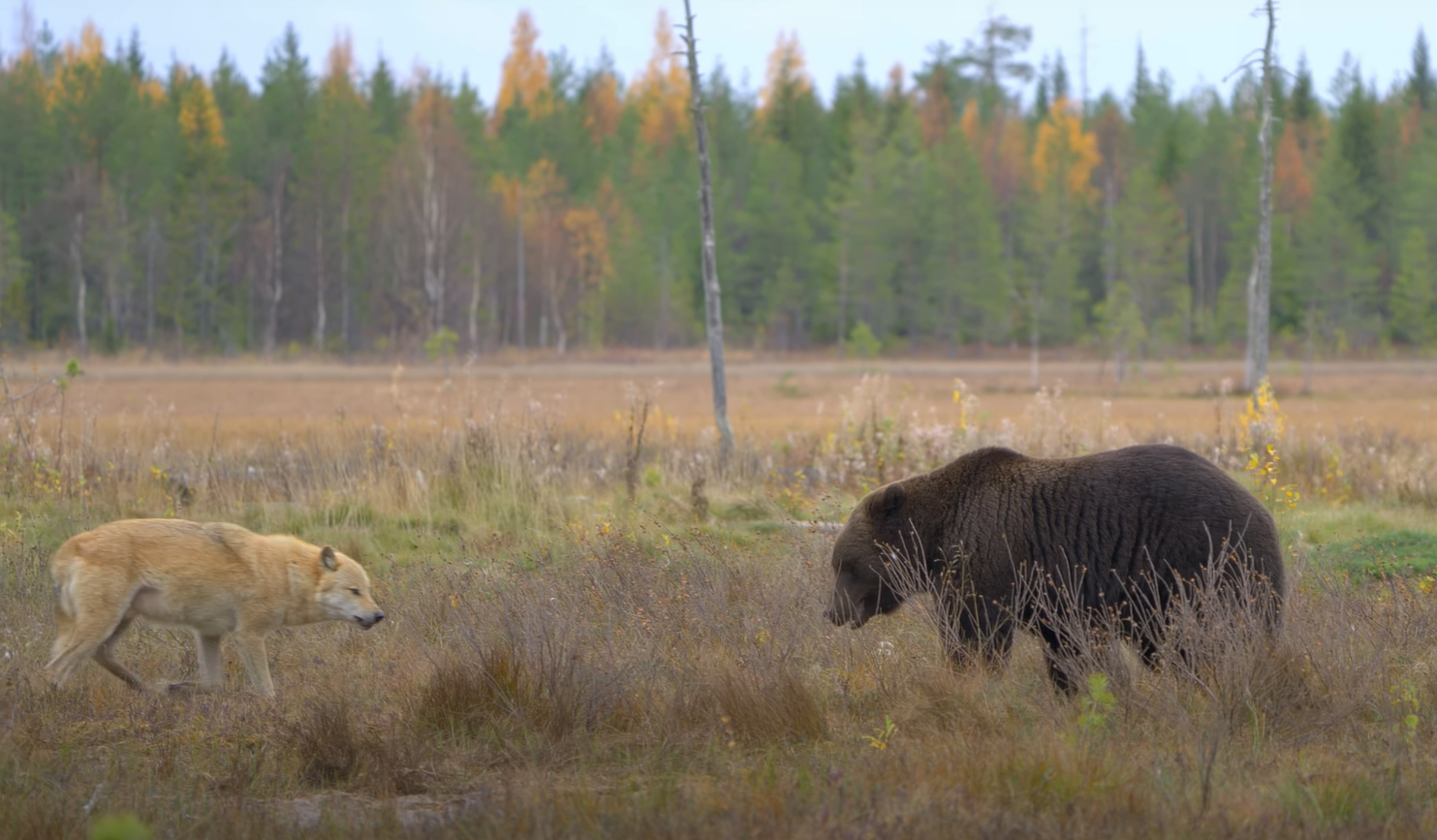
A brown bear and wolf in Kuhmo

By area the municipality is the second largest in the region (and the twelfth largest in the country), covering twice the land area of Luxembourg. The population is heavily concentrated in Kuhmo-town. Most of the area is very wild, featuring more than 600 lakes and for the rest extensively forested, providing a home to abundant wild life that includes Eurasian brown bears, Eurasian wolves and Finnish forest reindeer.

The Ministry of Agriculture and Forestry has set Kuhmo as a part of Eastern Finland´s stable bear population area. According to the plan, the population density of bears in this area will be maintained higher than in the rest of the country. The wolf population is also dense by comparison to the rest of the country. In consequence, the number of reindeer has decreased lately.

The topography is made up of low hills, of which the most significant are near the Russian frontier on the eastern side. To the south, Kuhmo is bordered by North Karelia.

Several nature reserves have been founded in Kuhmo for the protection of the frontier wilderness. Forest administration maintains several hiking routes on the reserves and almost all are accessible to the public.

=== Districts and villages ===
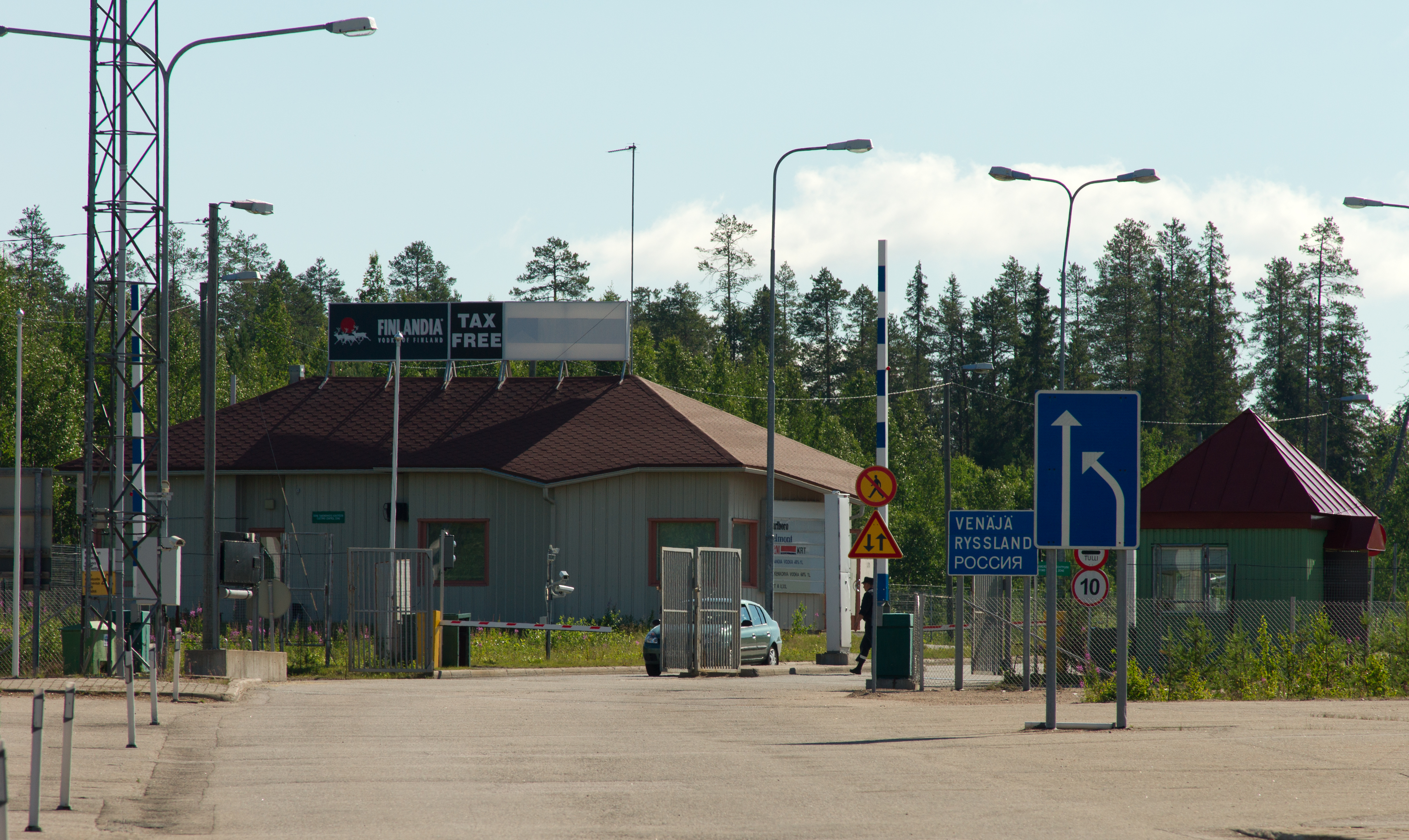
Russian border's checkpoint in Vartius, Kuhmo

Districts:

- Akonlahti
- Hankaranta
- Jaurakko
- Kalevala
- Kanninlampi
- Kantola
- Keitaala
- Kontio
- Korkeamäki
- Kuhmoniemi
- Levälahti
- Pajakka
- Piilola
- Saarikoski
- Sormula
- Suvanto

Villages:

- Haukela
- Hietaperä
- Härmänkylä
- Hukkajärvi
- Iivantiira
- Jonkeri
- Juonto
- Juttua
- Jyrkkä
- Jämäs
- Kalliojoki
- Katerma
- Kattilakoski
- Kiekinkoski
- Kivikiekki
- Korpisalmi
- Kuumu
- Kuusamonkylä
- Lammasperä
- Lauvuskylä
- Lentiira
- Lentua
- Niemiskylä
- Niva
- Saunajärvi
- Timoniemi
- Rasti
- Seilonen
- Sylväjä
- Vartius
- Vepsä
- Vieksi
- Viiksimo
- Vuosanka
- Ypykkävaara

==== Rimpi ====
Rimpi is a small village in northeastern Kuhmo and one of three settlements in Kainuu with a traditionally Karelian-speaking Orthodox Christian population, along with Kuivajärvi and Hietajärvi in Suomussalmi. Rimpi was home to Eljas (Uljaska) Ahtonen, who was the model for Väinämöinen in Akseli Gallen-Kallela's Aino triptych. Gallen-Kallela visited the village in 1890.

== Culture ==
Kuhmo is well known for its Kuhmo Chamber Music Festival which is held annually. The festival was founded in 1970 by cellist Seppo Kimanen and a small group of friends. A book on this subject was published in 2006.

Kuhmo has also served as a filming location for the 2025 French film Dracula, directed by Luc Besson.

== Sights ==
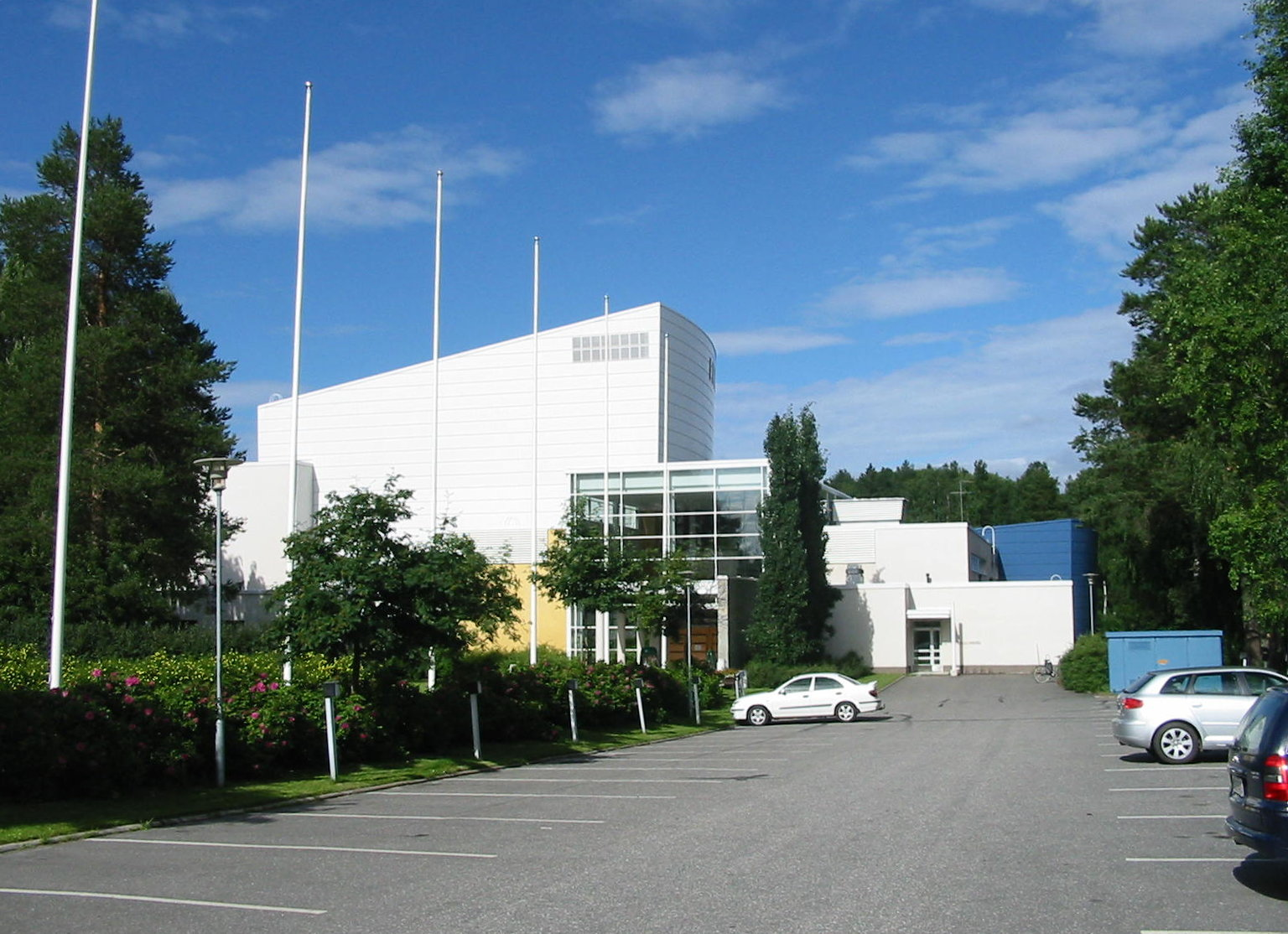
The Kuhmo Arts Centre

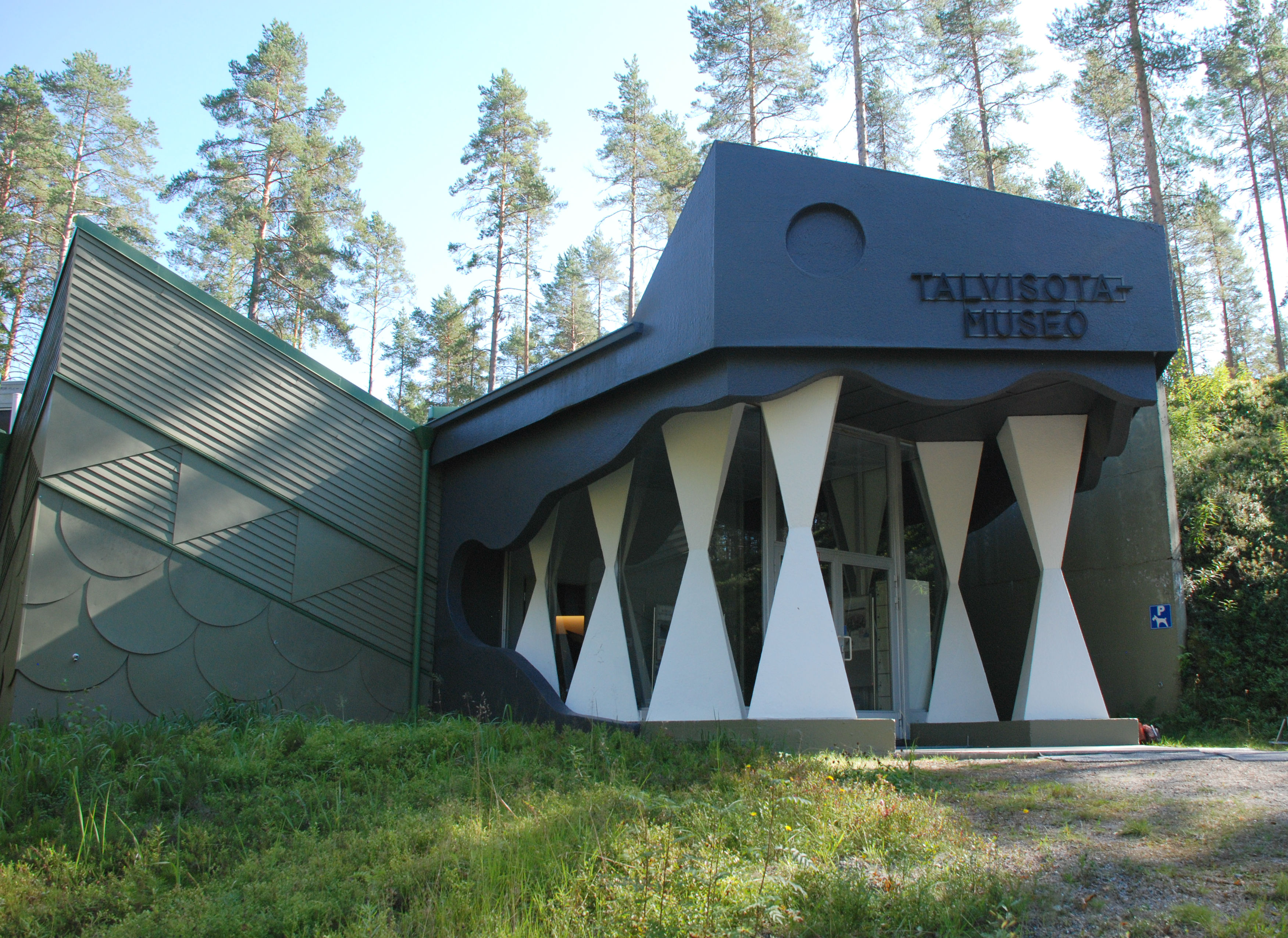
The Winter War Museum (Talvisotamuseo)

- Kuhmo Arts Centre
- Kalevala Village
- Juminkeko – The Information Center for the Kalevala and Karelian Culture.
- Petola Visitor Centre

== Politics ==
Results of the 2023 Finnish parliamentary election in Kuhmo:

- Centre Party 42.4%
- Finns Party 28.8%
- Social Democratic Party 11.2%
- Left Alliance 6.1%
- Christian Democrats 4.7%
- National Coalition Party 3.7%
- Green League 1.7%

As of 2021 Finnish municipal elections, Kuhmo town council is made up of: Centre Party (13 seats), Finns Party (6), National Coalition Party (3), Social Democratic Party (2), Left Alliance (1), Christian Democrats (1), and Green League (1).

== Notable people ==
- Hilja Gestrin Finnish architect, born in Kuhmo.
- Litku Klemetti Finnish musician, born in Kuhmo.
- Jenna Laukkanen Finnish swimmer, born in Kuhmo.
- Paula Lehtomäki Finnish politician, born in Kuhmo.
- Juho Mikkonen Finnish cross-country skier, born in Kuhmo.
- Jaakko Piirainen Finnish politician, born in Kuhmo.
- Paavo Puurunen Finnish biathlete, born in Kuhmo.
- Mikael Soininen Finnish professor and Professor, born in Kuhmo.
- Johan Gabriel Ståhlberg (1832–1873), Finnish priest and father of President K. J. Ståhlberg
- Karl Emil Ståhlberg Finnish photographer and engineer, born in Kuhmo.
- Heikki Westerinen Finnish grandmaster, lived in Kuhmo.

== International relations ==
=== Twin towns — Sister cities ===
Kuhmo is twinned with:

- Kostamus, Russia
- Oroszlány, Hungary
- Robertsfors, Sweden
- Šaľa, Slovakia

== See also ==
- Kostomuksha
- Lieksa
- Reboly
