= Loukhsky District =

Loukhsky District Лоухский район (Russian)
- District
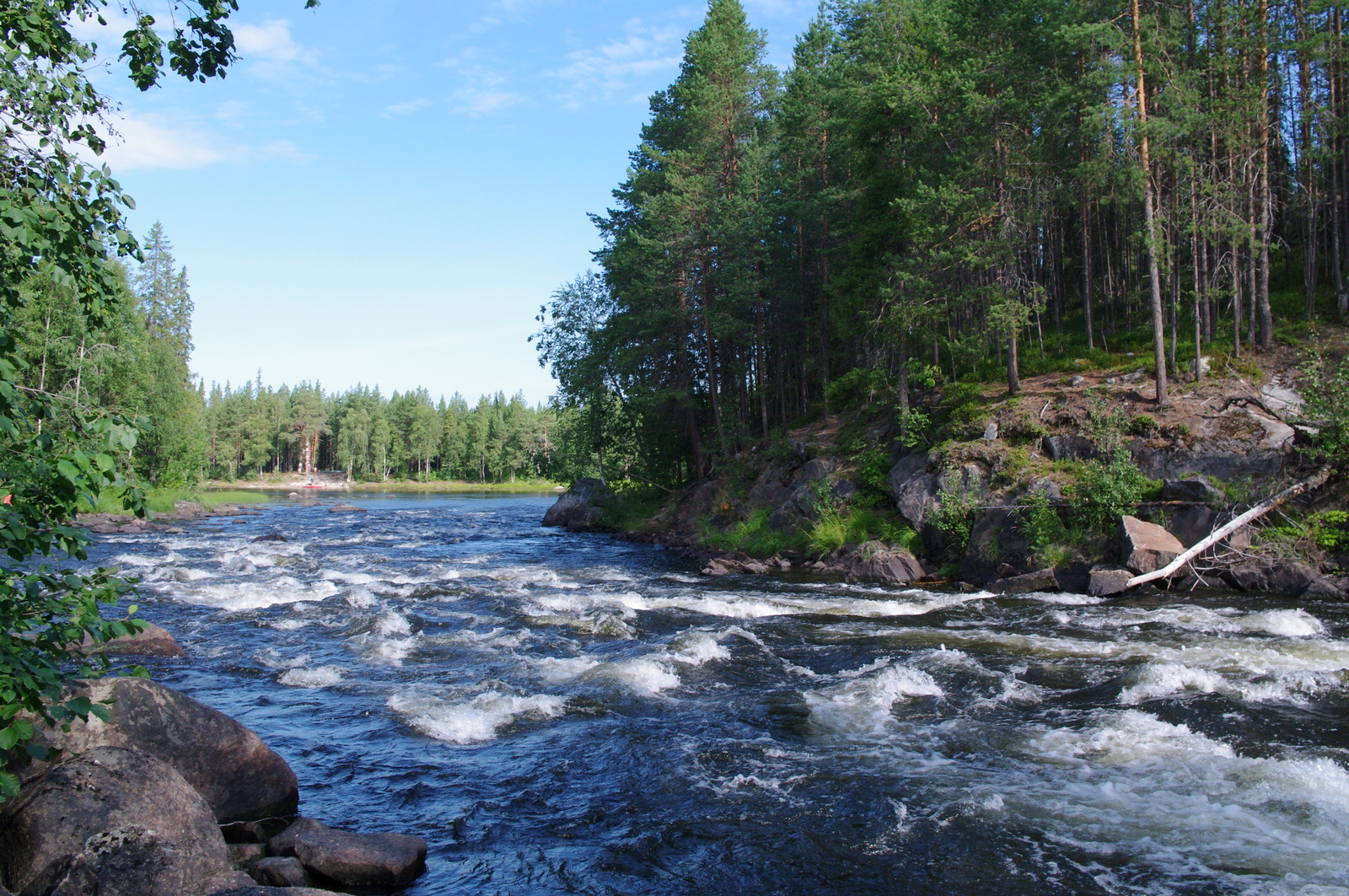
- The Keret River in Loukhsky District

- Flag Coat of arms
- Location of Loukhsky District in the Republic of Karelia
- Coordinates: 66°04′N 33°02′E
- Country: Russia
- Federal subject: Republic of Karelia
- Established: 29 August 1927
- Administrative center: Loukhi

Area
  - Total: 22,544 km^{2} (8,704 sq mi)

Population (2010 Census)
  - Total: 14,760
  - Density: 0.6547/km^{2} (1.696/sq mi)
  - Urban: 66.4%
  - Rural: 33.6%

Administrative structure
  - Inhabited localities: 3 urban-type settlements, 27 rural localities

Municipal structure
  - Municipally incorporated as: Loukhsky Municipal District
  - Municipal divisions: 3 urban settlements, 4 rural settlements
- Time zone: UTC+3 (UTC+03:00)
- OKTMO ID: 86621000
- Website: http://www.louhiadm.ru

Population of Loukhsky District
- 2010 Census: 14,760
- 2002 Census: 20,128
- 1989 Census: 24,715
- 1979 Census: 25,223

Loukhsky District (Russian: Ло́ухский райо́н; Karelian: Louhen piiri) is an administrative district (raion), one of the fifteen in the Republic of Karelia, Russia. It is located in the north of the republic. The area of the district is 22,544 square kilometers (8,704 sq mi). Its administrative center is the urban locality (an urban-type settlement) of Loukhi. As of the 2010 Census, the total population of the district was 14,760, with the population of Loukhi accounting for 32.3% of that number.

== History ==
On November 17, 1987, the Presidium of the Supreme Soviet of the Russian SFSR decreed to transfer the settlement of the railway station of Poyakonda from Tedinsky Selsoviet of Loukhsky District of the Karelian ASSR to Murmansk Oblast. By the Decision of the Murmansk Oblast Executive Committee of January 20, 1988, the settlement was merged with the inhabited locality of Poyakonda on the territory in jurisdiction of the town of Kandalaksha.

== Administrative and municipal status ==
Within the framework of administrative divisions, Loukhsky District is one of the fifteen in the Republic of Karelia and has administrative jurisdiction over three urban-type settlements (Chupa, Loukhi, and Pyaozersky) and twenty-seven rural localities. As a municipal division, the district is incorporated as Loukhsky Municipal District. The three urban-type settlements and one rural locality are incorporated into three urban settlements, while the remaining twenty-six rural localities are incorporated into four rural settlements within the municipal district. The urban-type settlement of Loukhi serves as the administrative center of both the administrative and municipal district.
