= LXX Army Corps =

Army corps of the German Wehrmacht during World War II

The LXX Army Corps (German: LXX. Armeekorps), initially known as Higher Command z. b. V. LXX (German: Höheres Kommando z. b. V. LXX) or Höh.Kdo.70, was an army corps of the German Wehrmacht during World War II. Throughout the war, it was deployed in occupied Norway.

== Operational history ==
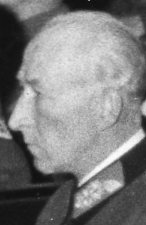
Hermann Tittel, corps commander of LXX Army Corps between 1943 and 1945.

The Höheres Kommando z. b. V. LXX was formed on 4 May 1941 in Schröttersburg and subsequently relocated to Oslo in occupied Norway. There, it was subordinate to Armee Norwegen, which was in turn under direct control of OKW. The initial commander of the corps, called to this task on 16 April 1941, was Valentin Feurstein. Initially, the division consisted of the 69th, 163rd and 214th Infantry Divisions.

The corps command was renamed to Generalkommando LXX. Armeekorps on 25 January 1943. On 22 June 1943, corps commander Valentin Feurstein was replaced by Hermann Tittel.

In December 1944, the LXX Army Corps was moved to the 20th Mountain Army after the dissolution of Armee Norwegen.

At the end of the war, the corps consisted of the 274th and 280th Infantry Divisions and the 613th Special Deployment Division.

== Organizational structure ==
Organizational chart of the LXX (70th) Wehrmacht Army Corps
Year	Date	Commander	Subordinate Divisions	Army	Army Group
1941	5 June	Valentin Feurstein	69th Infantry, 163rd Infantry, 214th Infantry	Armee Norwegen (v. Falkenhorst)	Directly under OKW
1941	1 July	Valentin Feurstein	69th Infantry, 214th Infantry	Armee Norwegen (v. Falkenhorst)	Directly under OKW
1941	7 August	Valentin Feurstein	69th Infantry, 214th Infantry, 710th Infantry	Armee Norwegen (v. Falkenhorst)	Directly under OKW
1941	3 September	Valentin Feurstein	69th Infantry, 214th Infantry, 710th Infantry	Armee Norwegen (v. Falkenhorst)	Directly under OKW
1941	2 October	Valentin Feurstein	69th Infantry, 214th Infantry, 710th Infantry	Armee Norwegen (v. Falkenhorst)	Directly under OKW
1941	4 November	Valentin Feurstein	69th Infantry, 214th Infantry, 710th Infantry	Armee Norwegen (v. Falkenhorst)	Directly under OKW
1941	4 December	Valentin Feurstein	69th Infantry, 214th Infantry, 710th Infantry	Armee Norwegen (v. Falkenhorst)	Directly under OKW
1942	2 January	Valentin Feurstein	69th Infantry, 214th Infantry, 710th Infantry	Armee Norwegen (v. Falkenhorst)	Directly under OKW
1942	6 February	Valentin Feurstein	69th Infantry, 214th Infantry, 710th Infantry	Armee Norwegen (v. Falkenhorst)	Directly under OKW
1942	10 March	Valentin Feurstein	69th Infantry, 214th Infantry, 710th Infantry	Armee Norwegen (v. Falkenhorst)	Directly under OKW
1942	5 April	Valentin Feurstein	69th Infantry, 214th Infantry, 710th Infantry	Armee Norwegen (v. Falkenhorst)	Directly under OKW
1942	11 May	Valentin Feurstein	69th Infantry, 214th Infantry, 280th Infantry, 710th Infantry	Armee Norwegen (v. Falkenhorst)	Directly under OKW
1942	8 June	Valentin Feurstein	69th Infantry, 214th Infantry, 280th Infantry, 710th Infantry	Armee Norwegen (v. Falkenhorst)	Directly under OKW
1942	4 July	Valentin Feurstein	69th Infantry, 214th Infantry, 280th Infantry, 710th Infantry	Armee Norwegen (v. Falkenhorst)	Directly under OKW
1942	5 August	Valentin Feurstein	69th Infantry, 214th Infantry, 280th Infantry, 710th Infantry	Armee Norwegen (v. Falkenhorst)	Directly under OKW
1942	2 September	Valentin Feurstein	69th Infantry, 214th Infantry, 280th Infantry, 710th Infantry	Armee Norwegen (v. Falkenhorst)	Directly under OKW
1942	8 October	Valentin Feurstein	69th Infantry, 214th Infantry, 280th Infantry, 710th Infantry	Armee Norwegen (v. Falkenhorst)	Directly under OKW
1942	5 November	Valentin Feurstein	214th Infantry, 280th Infantry, 710th Infantry	Armee Norwegen (v. Falkenhorst)	Directly under OKW
1942	1 December	Valentin Feurstein	214th Infantry, 269th Infantry, 280th Infantry, 710th Infantry	Armee Norwegen (v. Falkenhorst)	Directly under OKW
1943	1 January	Valentin Feurstein	214th Infantry, 269th Infantry, 280th Infantry, 710th Infantry	Armee Norwegen (v. Falkenhorst)	Directly under OKW
1943	3 February	Valentin Feurstein	214th Infantry, 269th Infantry, 280th Infantry, 710th Infantry	Armee Norwegen (v. Falkenhorst)	Directly under OKW
1943	4 March	Valentin Feurstein	214th Infantry, 269th Infantry, 280th Infantry, 710th Infantry	Armee Norwegen (v. Falkenhorst)	Directly under OKW
1943	9 April	Valentin Feurstein	214th Infantry, 269th Infantry, 280th Infantry, 710th Infantry	Armee Norwegen (v. Falkenhorst)	Directly under OKW
1943	1 May	Valentin Feurstein	214th Infantry, 269th Infantry, 280th Infantry, 710th Infantry	Armee Norwegen (v. Falkenhorst)	Directly under OKW
1943	1 June	Valentin Feurstein	214th Infantry, 269th Infantry, 280th Infantry, 710th Infantry	Armee Norwegen (v. Falkenhorst)	Directly under OKW
1943	7 July	Hermann Tittel	214th Infantry, 269th Infantry, 280th Infantry, 710th Infantry	Armee Norwegen (v. Falkenhorst)	Directly under OKW
1943	5 August	Hermann Tittel	214th Infantry, 269th Infantry, 295th Infantry, 710th Infantry	Armee Norwegen (v. Falkenhorst)	Directly under OKW
1943	5 September	Hermann Tittel	269th Infantry, 274th Infantry, 710th Infantry	Armee Norwegen (v. Falkenhorst)	Directly under OKW
1943	4 October	Hermann Tittel	269th Infantry, 274th Infantry, 710th Infantry	Armee Norwegen (v. Falkenhorst)	Directly under OKW
1943	8 November	Hermann Tittel	269th Infantry, 274th Infantry, 280th Infantry, 710th Infantry	Armee Norwegen (v. Falkenhorst)	Directly under OKW
1943	3 December	Hermann Tittel	269th Infantry, 274th Infantry, 280th Infantry, 710th Infantry	Armee Norwegen (v. Falkenhorst)	Directly under OKW
1944	January	Hermann Tittel	269th Infantry, 274th Infantry, 280th Infantry, 710th Infantry	Armee Norwegen (v. Falkenhorst)	Directly under OKW
1944	February	Hermann Tittel	269th Infantry, 274th Infantry, 280th Infantry, 710th Infantry	Armee Norwegen (v. Falkenhorst)	Directly under OKW
1944	March	Hermann Tittel	269th Infantry, 274th Infantry, 280th Infantry, 710th Infantry	Armee Norwegen (v. Falkenhorst)	Directly under OKW
1944	April	Hermann Tittel	269th Infantry, 274th Infantry, 280th Infantry, 710th Infantry	Armee Norwegen (v. Falkenhorst)	Directly under OKW
1944	May	Hermann Tittel	269th Infantry, 274th Infantry, 280th Infantry, 710th Infantry	Armee Norwegen (v. Falkenhorst)	Directly under OKW
1944	11 June	Hermann Tittel	269th Infantry, 274th Infantry, 280th Infantry, 710th Infantry	Armee Norwegen (v. Falkenhorst)	Directly under OKW
1944	22 July	Hermann Tittel	269th Infantry, 274th Infantry, 280th Infantry, 710th Infantry	Armee Norwegen (v. Falkenhorst)	Directly under OKW
1944	31 August	Hermann Tittel	269th Infantry, 274th Infantry, 280th Infantry, 710th Infantry	Armee Norwegen (v. Falkenhorst)	Directly under OKW
1944	16 September	Hermann Tittel	269th Infantry, 274th Infantry, 280th Infantry, 710th Infantry	Armee Norwegen (v. Falkenhorst)	Directly under OKW
1944	13 October	Hermann Tittel	274th Infantry, 280th Infantry, 710th Infantry	Armee Norwegen (v. Falkenhorst)	Directly under OKW
1944	5 November	Hermann Tittel	274th Infantry, 280th Infantry, 710th Infantry	Armee Norwegen (v. Falkenhorst)	Directly under OKW
1944	26 November	Hermann Tittel	274th Infantry, 280th Infantry, 710th Infantry	Armee Norwegen (v. Falkenhorst)	Directly under OKW
1944	31 December	Hermann Tittel	274th Infantry, 280th Infantry	20th Mountain Army (Rendulic, Böhme)	Directly under OKW
1945	19 February	Hermann Tittel	274th Infantry, 280th Infantry	20th Mountain Army (Rendulic, Böhme)	Directly under OKW
1945	1 March	Hermann Tittel	169th Infantry, 274th Infantry, 280th Infantry	20th Mountain Army (Rendulic, Böhme)	Directly under OKW
1945	12 April	Hermann Tittel	274th Infantry, 280th Infantry, Division z. b. V. 613	20th Mountain Army (Rendulic, Böhme)	Directly under OKW

== Noteworthy individuals ==
- Valentin Feurstein, corps commander between 16 April 1941 and 22 June 1943.
- Hermann Tittel, corps commander between 22 June 1943 and the end of the war.
