= List of Knight's Cross of the Iron Cross recipients (D) =

The Knight's Cross of the Iron Cross (German: Ritterkreuz des Eisernen Kreuzes) and its variants were the highest awards given to the military and paramilitary forces of Nazi Germany during World War II. The Knight's Cross of the Iron Cross was awarded for a wide range of achievements and across all ranks, ranging from a senior commander for skilled leadership of his troops in battle to a low-ranking soldier for a single act of extreme gallantry. A total of 7,321 awards were made between its first presentation on 30 September 1939 and its last bestowal on 17 June 1945. (Note: Großadmiral and President of Germany Karl Dönitz, Hitler's successor as Head of State (Staatsoberhaupt) and Supreme Commander of the Armed Forces, had ordered the cessation of all promotions and awards as of 11 May 1945 (Dönitz-decree). Consequently the last Knight's Cross awarded to Oberleutnant zur See of the Reserves Georg-Wolfgang Feller on 17 June 1945 must therefore be considered a de facto but not de jure hand-out.) This number is based on the analysis and acceptance of the order commission of the Association of Knight's Cross Recipients (AKCR). Presentations were made to members of the three military branches of the Wehrmacht—the Heer (Army), Kriegsmarine (Navy) and Luftwaffe (Air Force)—as well as the Waffen-SS, the Reichsarbeitsdienst (RAD—Reich Labour Service) and the Volkssturm (German national militia). There were also 43 recipients in the military forces of allies of the Third Reich.

These recipients are listed in the 1986 edition of Walther-Peer Fellgiebel's book, Die Träger des Ritterkreuzes des Eisernen Kreuzes 1939–1945 — The Bearers of the Knight's Cross of the Iron Cross 1939–1945. Fellgiebel was the former chairman and head of the order commission of the AKCR. In 1996, the second edition of this book was published with an addendum delisting 11 of these original recipients. Author Veit Scherzer has cast doubt on a further 193 of these listings. The majority of the disputed recipients had received the award in 1945, when the deteriorating situation of Germany in the final days of World War II in Europe left a number of nominations incomplete and pending in various stages of the approval process.

Listed here are the 238 Knight's Cross recipients whose last name starts with "D". Scherzer has challenged the validity of six of these listings. The recipients are initially ordered alphabetically by last name. The rank listed is the recipient's rank at the time the Knight's Cross was awarded.

== Background ==
The Knight's Cross of the Iron Cross and its higher grades were based on four separate enactments. The first enactment, Reichsgesetzblatt I S. 1573 of 1 September 1939 instituted the Iron Cross (Eisernes Kreuz), the Knight's Cross of the Iron Cross and the Grand Cross of the Iron Cross (Großkreuz des Eisernen Kreuzes). Article 2 of the enactment mandated that the award of a higher class be preceded by the award of all preceding classes. As the war progressed, some of the recipients of the Knight's Cross distinguished themselves further and a higher grade, the Knight's Cross of the Iron Cross with Oak Leaves (Ritterkreuz des Eisernen Kreuzes mit Eichenlaub), was instituted. The Oak Leaves, as they were commonly referred to, were based on the enactment Reichsgesetzblatt I S. 849 of 3 June 1940. In 1941, two higher grades of the Knight's Cross were instituted. The enactment Reichsgesetzblatt I S. 613 of 28 September 1941 introduced the Knight's Cross of the Iron Cross with Oak Leaves and Swords (Ritterkreuz des Eisernen Kreuzes mit Eichenlaub und Schwertern) and the Knight's Cross of the Iron Cross with Oak Leaves, Swords and Diamonds (Ritterkreuz des Eisernen Kreuzes mit Eichenlaub, Schwertern und Brillanten). At the end of 1944 the final grade, the Knight's Cross of the Iron Cross with Golden Oak Leaves, Swords, and Diamonds (Ritterkreuz des Eisernen Kreuzes mit goldenem Eichenlaub, Schwertern und Brillanten), based on the enactment Reichsgesetzblatt 1945 I S. 11 of 29 December 1944, became the final variant of the Knight's Cross authorized.

== Recipients ==
Knight's Cross of the Iron Cross (D)
Service	Number of presentations	Posthumous presentations
Heer	149	18
Kriegsmarine	7	0
Luftwaffe	57	5
Waffen-SS	25	1

The Oberkommando der Wehrmacht (Supreme Command of the Armed Forces) kept separate Knight's Cross lists, one for each of the three military branches, Heer (Army), Kriegsmarine (Navy), Luftwaffe (Air Force) and Waffen-SS. Within each of these lists a unique sequential number was assigned to each recipient. The same numbering paradigm was applied to the higher grades of the Knight's Cross, one list per grade. Of the 238 awards made to servicemen whose last name starts with "D", 20 were later awarded the Knight's Cross of the Iron Cross with Oak Leaves, six the Knight's Cross of the Iron Cross with Oak Leaves and Swords and one, Josef Dietrich, the Knight's Cross of the Iron Cross with Oak Leaves, Swords and Diamonds; 24 presentations were made posthumously. One hundred and forty-nine Heer members received the medal, seven went to the Kriegsmarine, 57 to the Luftwaffe, and 25 to the Waffen-SS. The sequential numbers greater than 843 for the Knight's Cross of the Iron Cross with Oak Leaves and 143 for the Knight's Cross of the Iron Cross with Oak Leaves and Swords are unofficial and were assigned by the Association of Knight's Cross Recipients (AKCR) and are therefore denoted in parentheses.

This along with the + (plus) indicates that a higher grade of Knight's Cross was awarded as well.
This along with the * (asterisk) indicates that the Knight's Cross was awarded posthumously.
This along with the ? (question mark) indicates that historian Veit Scherzer has expressed doubt regarding the veracity and formal correctness of the listing.

Name	Service	Rank	Role and unit (Note: For an explanation of the various naming schemes used by the Luftwaffe, Heer, Kriegsmarine and Waffen-SS refer to nomenclature used by the Wehrmacht and Waffen-SS.)	Date of award	Notes	Image
Paul-Heinrich Dähne	Luftwaffe	Oberleutnant	Staffelkapitän of the 12./Jagdgeschwader 11 (previously 2./Jagdgeschwader 52) (Note: According to Scherzer on 8 April 1944 as Staffelkapitän of the 2./Jagdgeschwader 52.)	6 April 1944	—	—
Walther Dahl+	Luftwaffe	Major	Gruppenkommandeur of the III./Jagdgeschwader 3 "Udet"	11 March 1944	Awarded 724th Oak Leaves 1 February 1945	—
Hermann Dahlke	Waffen-SS	SS-Oberscharführer	Company troop leader in the 3./1. SS-Panzergrenadier-Regiment "Leibstandarte SS Adolf Hitler"	3 March 1943	—	
Kurt Dahlmann+	Luftwaffe	Major	Gruppenkommandeur of the I./Schnellkampfgeschwader 10	11 June 1944	Awarded 711th Oak Leaves 24 January 1945	—
Hugo Dahmer	Luftwaffe	Oberfeldwebel	Pilot in the 6./Jagdgeschwader 5 (Note: According to Scherzer on 30 July 1941 as pilot in the I./Jagdgeschwader 77.)	1 August 1941	—	—
Paul Dahms	Heer	Hauptmann	Leader of Sturmgeschütz-Brigade 286	3 November 1944	—	—
Werner Dallmann	Waffen-SS	SS-Untersturmführer	Regiment adjutant of SS-Kavallerie-Regiment 53 "Florian Geyer" (Note: According to Scherzer as adjutant in SS-Kavallerie-Regiment 53.)	17 January 1945	—	—
Josef Dallmeier	Heer	Leutnant	Leader of Panzer-Jäger-Kompanie 1183	28 March 1945	—	—
Hans Dally	Luftwaffe	Hauptmann	Deputy commander of gemischte (joint) Flak-Abteilung 5 (L) (motorized)	11 June 1944	—	—
Friedrich-Karl Freiherr von Dalwigk zu Lichtenfels	Luftwaffe	Hauptmann	Gruppenkommandeur of the I./Sturzkampfgeschwader 77	21 July 1940*	Killed in action 9 July 1940	—
Dieter Damerius	Heer	Leutnant of the Reserves	Leader of the 5./Grenadier-Regiment 273	24 February 1945	—	—
Otto Damm	Heer	Oberfeldwebel	Zugführer (platoon leader) in the 10./Grenadier-Regiment 216	4 August 1943*	Killed in action 16 July 1943	—
Heinrich Dammeier	Kriegsmarine	Stabsobermaschinist	Chief mechanic on U-270	12 August 1944	—	—
Hans Dammers	Luftwaffe	Feldwebel	Pilot in the 9./Jagdgeschwader 52 (Note: According to Scherzer as pilot in the 7./Jagdgeschwader 52.)	23 August 1942	—	—
Werner Damsch	Waffen-SS	SS-Hauptsturmführer	Commander of the I./SS-Panzergrenadier-Regiment 25 "Hitlerjugend" (Note: According to Scherzer as commander of the I./SS-Panzergrenadier-Regiment 25.)	17 April 1945	—	—
Paul Danhauser	Heer	Oberst	Commander of Infanterie-Regiment 427	10 February 1942	—	—
Richard Daniel+	Heer	Oberstleutnant	Commander of Infanterie-Regiment 391	25 July 1942	Awarded (857th) Oak Leaves 30 April 1945	—
Alexander Edler von Daniels	Heer	Generalmajor	Commander of the 376. Infanterie-Division	18 December 1942	—	—
Alfred Dannebaum	Heer	Rittmeister	Leader of Panzer-Aufklärungs-Abteilung 24	17 September 1944	—	—
Franz Danowski	Heer	Oberleutnant	Leader of the 10./Panzergrenadier-Regiment 111 (Note: According to Scherzer as leader of the 10.(Pionier)/Panzergrenadier-Regiment 111.)	18 October 1944*	Died of wounds 10 October 1944	—
Hermann Danzer	Heer	Leutnant	Zugführer (platoon leader) in the 2./Panzer-Pionier-Bataillon 57	21 December 1940*	Killed in action 20 June 1940	—
Fritz Darges	Waffen-SS	SS-Obersturmbannführer	Leader of SS-Panzer-Regiment 5 "Wiking" (Note: According to Scherzer as leader of SS-Panzer-Regiment 5.)	5 April 1945	—	—
Walter Dargies	Heer	Hauptmann of the Reserves	Battalion leader in Grenadier-Regiment 418 (Note: According to Scherzer as leader of the III./Grenadier-Regiment 418.)	11 January 1943	—	—
Wolfgang Darius	Heer	Hauptmann	Commander of Panzer-Abteilung 21	22 August 1943	—	—
Paul-Friedrich Darjes	Luftwaffe	Major	Gruppenkommandeur of the II./Schlachtgeschwader 1	14 October 1942	—	
Erich Darnedde	Heer	Hauptmann of the Reserves	Leader of the I./Grenadier-Regiment 277	8 February 1943	—	—
Edmund Daser	Luftwaffe	Hauptmann	Staffelkapitän of the 1./Kampfgeschwader 40	21 February 1941	—	
Karl Daske	Heer	Hauptmann	Commander of Divions-Füsilier-Bataillon 12	14 April 1945	—	—
Rudi Dassow	Luftwaffe	Leutnant	Pilot in the II./Zerstörergeschwader 26 "Horst Wessel"	5 September 1944*	Killed in action 25 August 1944	—
Friedrich Dath	Heer	Oberwachtmeister	Zugführer (platoon leader) in the 3./Sturmgeschütz-Brigade 286	9 December 1944	—	—
Dr.-jur. Henning Daubert	Heer	Oberst	Commander of Grenadier-Regiment 426	5 March 1945	—	—
Hans Daumiller	Heer	Oberleutnant	Chief of the 11./Gebirgsjäger-Regiment 98	29 September 1940	—	—
Klaus Dauner	Heer	Oberst	Commander of Jäger-Regiment 737	16 November 1944	—	—
Hans Dauser	Waffen-SS	SS-Oberscharführer	Zugführer (platoon leader) in the 2./SS-Panzer-Regiment 1 "Leibstandarte SS Adolf Hitler"	4 June 1944	—	—
Ernst David	Heer	Obergefreiter	Machine gunner in the 3./Grenadier-Regiment 118	16 August 1943*	Killed in action 11 August 1943	—
Herbert Dawedeit	Luftwaffe	Oberfeldwebel	Pilot in the 8./Sturzkampfgeschwader 77	29 February 1944	—	—
Leo-Otto Debiel	Heer	Oberwachtmeister	Battery officer in the 2./Artillerie-Regiment 253	19 November 1944*	Killed in action 9 October 1944	—
Heinrich-Anton Deboi	Heer	Generalmajor	Commander of the 44. Infanterie-Division	10 September 1942	—	
Heinrich Debus	Waffen-SS	SS-Obersturmführer	Deputy leader of SS-Panzer-Aufklärungs-Abteilung 5 "Wiking" (Note: According to Scherzer as deputy leader of SS-Panzer-Aufklärungs-Abteilung 5.)	4 May 1944	—	—
Otto Debus	Luftwaffe	Oberleutnant	Observer in the 1.(H)/Nahaufklärungs-Gruppe 12 (Note: According to Scherzer as observer in the Aufklärungs-Staffel 11.(H)/12.)	5 April 1944	—	—
Karl Decker+	Heer	Oberstleutnant	Commander of the I./Panzer-Regiment 3	13 June 1941	Awarded 466th Oak Leaves 4 May 1944 (149th) Swords 26 April 1945? (Note: The German Federal Archives hold no records for the presentation of the Swords to Karl Decker. The Association of Knight's Cross Recipients (AKCR) assumes that the presentation fell into the timeframe 20 April 1945 to 29 April 1945. It is assumed that the nomination was approved on 26 April 1945. Scherzer states that the assumption is based on a statement from Decker's widow. She claimed that she had been informed that her husband had received the award. The date and sequential number "149" were assigned by the AKCR.)	—
Bruno Dederichs	Heer	Major	Leader of Grenadier-Regiment 409	14 April 1945	—	—
Johannes Deegener	Heer	Oberstleutnant im Generalstab	Leader of Jäger-Regiment 49	22 August 1943*	Killed in action 31 July 1943	—
Günther Degen	Waffen-SS	SS-Hauptsturmführer	Leader of the I./SS-Gebirgsjäger-Regiment 11 "Reinhard Heydrich"	7 October 1944	—	
Hans Degen	Heer	Generalleutnant	Commander of the 2. Gebirgs-Division	11 March 1945	—	—
Franz Degl	Heer	Unteroffizier	Group leader in the 8./Grenadier-Regiment 62	23 October 1944	—	—
Léon Degrelle+	Waffen-SS	SS-Hauptsturmführer (Note: According to Scherzer as SS-Hauptsturmführer of the Reserves and leader of the 5. SS-Freiwilligen-Brigade "Wallonien".)	Leader of SS-Freiwilligen-Brigade "Wallonien"	20 February 1944	(no number) Oak Leaves 27 August 1944	
Ernst Dehmel	Waffen-SS	SS-Hauptsturmführer	Deputy leader of SS-Sturmgeschütz-Abteilung 3 "Totenkopf" (Note: According to Scherzer as deputy leader of SS-Sturmgeschütz-Abteilung 3.)	15 August 1943	—	
Ernst Dehner	Heer	Generalmajor	Commander of the 106. Infanterie-Division	18 October 1941	—	
Kurt Deichen	Heer	Hauptmann of the Reserves	Commander of Panzer-Aufklärungs-Abteilung 3	10 September 1943	—	—
Paul Deichmann	Luftwaffe	Generalleutnant	Commanding general of the II. Fliegerkorps (Note: According to Scherzer as commander of the 1. Flieger-Division.)	26 March 1944	—	—
Hermann Deisenberger	Heer	Major	Commander of the II./Panzer-Artillerie-Regiment 16	20 October 1944	—	—
Dr.-jur. Eduard Deisenhofer	Waffen-SS	SS-Sturmbannführer	Commander of a Kampfgruppe in the 3. SS-"Totenkopf"-Division (Note: According to Scherzer as commander of the I./SS-"Totenkopf"-Infanterie-Regiment 1.)	8 May 1942	—	—
Egon Delica	Luftwaffe	Leutnant	Deputy leader of Sturmgruppe "Granit" in the Fallschirmjäger-Sturm-Abteilung "Koch"	12 May 1940	—	
Paul Delius	Heer	Major	Ia (operations officer) with the fortress commander Abschnitt 44 (section 44) general Matterstock (Note: According to Scherzer as Ia (operations officer)/commander fortress Abschnitt 44 (section 44).)	11 March 1945	—	—
Waldemar Demand	Heer	Leutnant	Leader of the 1./Füssilier-Regiment 22	17 March 1945*	Killed in action 21 February 1945	—
Rudolf Demme+	Heer	Oberst	Commander of Panzergrenadier-Regiment 59	14 August 1943	Awarded 537th Oak Leaves 28 July 1944	—
August Dempke	Heer	Oberfeldwebel	Messenger squadron leader in the 2./Grenadier-Regiment 24	17 March 1945	—	—
Siegfried Deneke	Heer	Unteroffizier	Group leader in the 6./Grenadier-Regiment 166	9 June 1944*	Killed in action 16 March 1944	—
Gustav Denk	Luftwaffe	Oberleutnant	Pilot in the Stab II./Jagdgeschwader 52	14 March 1943*	Killed in action 13 February 1943	—
Wilhelm Denk	Heer	Leutnant of the Reserves	Leader of the 1./Panzergrenadier-Regiment 74	14 May 1944	—	—
Walter Denkert	Heer	Oberst	Deputy leader of the 19. Panzer-Division	14 May 1944	—	—
Oskar-Hubert Dennhardt+	Heer	Major	Commander of the II./Grenadier-Regiment 11 and regiment leader (Note: According to Scherzer as leader of Grenadier-Regiment 11.)	17 March 1944	Awarded (870th) Oak Leaves 9 May 1945? (Note: Major Joachim Domaschk, who processed the nomination at the Heerespersonalamt (HPA—Army Staff Office) from the troop, had sent a message to the AOK Ostpreußen on 28 March 1945 requesting an approval from the Armeekorps and the Armee. This approval was never received before the end of hostilities. Oskar-Hubert Dennhardt is not listed in the book for the "nominations for the higher grades of the Knight's Cross of the Iron Cross" nor in the nomination book for Knight's Cross (starting with Nr. 5100). According to the Association of Knight's Cross Recipients (AKCR) the award was present in accordance with the Dönitz-decree. This is illegal according to the Deutsche Dienststelle (WASt) and lacks legal justification. The sequential number "870" and the presentation date were assigned by the AKCR. Dennhardt was a member of the AKCR.)	—
Rudolf Denninger	Heer	Oberleutnant of the Reserves	Chief of the 1./Grenadier-Regiment 439	1 September 1943	—	—
Dipl.-Ing. Franz Denzinger	Heer	Oberst	Commander of the regiment Stab Artillerie-Regiment 553 z.b.V. (Note: According to Scherzer as commander of the Artillerie-Regiments Stab z.b.V. 553.)	5 September 1944	—	—
Hans-Werner Deppe	Heer	Oberleutnant	Chief of the 3./Grenadier-Regiment 58	14 August 1943	—	—
Otto Deßloch+	Luftwaffe	Generalmajor	Commanding general of the II. Flakkorps	24 June 1940	Awarded 470th Oak Leaves 10 May 1944	
Erich Dethleffsen	Heer	Oberst im Generalstab	Chief of the Generalstab of the XXXIX. Panzerkorps	23 December 1943	—	—
Theodor Detmers	Kriegsmarine	Fregattenkapitän	Commander of auxiliary cruiser Kormoran (HSK-8)	4 December 1941	—	
Werner Dettenberg	Heer	Oberleutnant of the Reserves (Note: According to Scherzer as Hauptmann of the Reserves.)	Chief of the 6./Grenadier-Regiment 852	18 September 1944*	Died of wounds 12 September 1944	—
Oskar Dettke	Luftwaffe	Hauptmann	Staffelkapitän of the 9./Kampfgeschwader 55	7 April 1945	—	—
Ferdinand Deutsch? (Note: No evidence of the award can be found in the German Federal Archives. According to Walther-Peer Fellgiebel the Knight's Cross of the Iron Cross was awarded to Ferdinand Deutsch by Field Marshal Ferdinand Schörner in accordance with the accreditation of 3 May 1945. The author Veit Scherzer was denied access to files, which could help clarify the case, of the Association of Knight's Cross Recipients (AKCR) on the grounds of the Bundesarchivgesetz (German Archive Law). Deutsch was a member of the AKCR.)	Heer	Oberleutnant of the Reserves	Leader of a Kampfgruppe	6 May 1945	—	—
Heinz Deutsch	Luftwaffe	Leutnant of the Reserves	Leader of the 3./Fallschirm-Sturmgeschütz-Brigade 12 (Note: According to Scherzer as leader of the 1./Fallschirm-Sturmgeschütz-Brigade 12.)	28 April 1945	—	—
Erich Deutschländer	Heer	Hauptmann	Commander of the II./Grenadier-Regiment 328	26 March 1944	—	—
Siegfried Deutschmann	Heer	Oberfeldwebel	Leader of the 8./Grenadier-Regiment 463	11 December 1944	—	—
Hugo Deventer	Heer	Unteroffizier	Group leader of the 3./Pionier-Bataillon 31	30 July 1943	—	—
Hans-Werner Devers	Heer	Oberleutnant of the Reserves	Chief of the 3./Aufklärungs-Abteilung 101	2 June 1943	—	—
Eckhardt von Dewitz	Heer	Leutnant of the Reserves	Adjutant of the II./Gebirgsjäger-Regiment 143	17 August 1943	—	—
Anton Dicke	Heer	Obergefreiter	Group leader in the 5./Grenadier-Regiment 3	21 February 1943*	Killed in action 26 January 1943	—
Adolf Dickfeld+	Luftwaffe	Leutnant	Pilot in the 7./Jagdgeschwader 52	19 March 1942	Awarded 94th Oak Leaves 19 May 1942 (Note: According to Scherzer on 18 May 1942.)	—
Diddo Diddens+	Heer	Leutnant of the Reserves	Zugführer (platoon leader) in the 2./Sturmgeschütz-Abteilung 185	18 March 1942	Awarded 501st Oak Leaves 15 June 1944	—
August Dieckmann+	Waffen-SS	SS-Sturmbannführer	Commander of the I./SS-Regiment "Germania" (Note: According to Scherzer as commander of the I./SS-Regiment (motorized) "Germania".)	23 April 1942	Awarded 233rd Oak Leaves 16 April 1943; 39th Swords 10 October 1943	
Josef Diefenthal	Waffen-SS	SS-Hauptsturmführer (Note: According to Scherzer as SS-Hauptsturmführer of the Reserves.)	Commander of the III.(gepanzert)/SS-Panzergrenadier-Regiment 2 "Leibstandarte SS Adolf Hitler"	5 February 1945	—	—
Erwin Diekwisch	Luftwaffe	Leutnant	Pilot in the 9./Sturzkampfgeschwader 1 (Note: According to Scherzer as adjutant in the III./Sturzkampfgeschwader 1.)	15 October 1942	—	—
Horst Dieling	Heer	Leutnant (Note: According to Scherzer as Leutnant of the Reserves.)	Leader of the 7./Grenadier-Regiment 434	18 January 1944	—	—
Otto Diem	Heer	Wachtmeister	Gun leader in the 3.(schwere)/Aufklärungs-Abteilung 9	23 September 1943*	Killed in action 8 August 1943	—
Erich Dienenthal	Heer	Oberleutnant	Leader of the 2.(Radfahr)/Divisions-Aufklärungs-Abteilung 45 (Note: According to Scherzer as leader of the 2.(Radfahr)/Aufklärungs-Abteilung 45.)	14 December 1941	—	—
Johannes Dienhold	Luftwaffe	Oberleutnant of the Reserves	Chief of the 3./Flak-Regiment 23 (motorized)	14 June 1941	—	—
Max Diepold	Luftwaffe	Oberleutnant	Staffelkapitän of the 10.(Panzer)/Schlachtgeschwader 77	28 March 1945	—	—
Hans Diergarten	Waffen-SS	SS-Sturmbannführer	Ia (operartions officer) of the 8. SS-Kavallerie-Division "Florian Geyer"	16 January 1944	—	—
Karl-Heinz Dierks	Heer	Hauptmann	Leader of the II./Grenadier-Regiment 42	13 January 1945	—	—
Joachim Diesener	Heer	Hauptmann	Commander of the I./Panzergrenadier-Regiment 33	9 June 1944	—	—
Ulrich Diesing	Luftwaffe	Major	Geschwaderkommodore of Zerstörergeschwader 1	6 September 1942	—	—
Erich Diestel	Heer	Generalleutnant	Commander of the 346. Infanterie-Division	8 October 1944	—	—
Eduard Dietl+	Heer	Generalleutnant	Commander of the 3. Gebirgs-Division	9 May 1940	Awarded 1st Oak Leaves 19 July 1940; 72nd Swords 1 July 1944	
Walter Dietlen	Heer	Oberstleutnant	Commander of Kradschützen-Bataillon 54	4 December 1941	—	—
Gerhard Dietrich	Luftwaffe	Fahnenjunker-Feldwebel	Pilot in the Stab/Kampfgeschwader 55	9 June 1944	—	—
Johann Dietrich	Luftwaffe	Hauptmann	Chief of the 2./Flak-Regiment 49 (motorized)	23 December 1942	—	—
Josef Dietrich+	Waffen-SS	SS-Obergruppenführer and General of the Waffen-SS	Commander of SS-Infanterie-Regiment (motorized) "Leibstandarte SS Adolf Hitler"	4 July 1940	Awarded 41st Oak Leaves 31 December 1941; 26th Swords 14 March 1943; 16th Diamonds 6 August 1944	
Karl-Heinz Dietrich	Heer	Hauptmann of the Reserves	Commander of the II./Panzergrenadier-Regiment 3	26 June 1944	—	—
Wilhelm Dietrich	Waffen-SS	SS-Hauptsturmführer and Hauptmann of the Schupo	Leader of the III./SS-Polizei-Schützen-Regiment 1	15 October 1944	—	—
Bernhard Dietsche	Waffen-SS	SS-Sturmbannführer	Commander of the II./SS-Gebirgsjäger-Regiment 2 (Note: According to Scherzer as commander of the II./SS-Gebirgsjäger-Regiment 2 "Prinz Eugen".)	17 July 1943	—	—
Edwin-Oskar Dietz	Heer	Leutnant	Zugführer (platoon leader) in the I./Schützen-Regiment 11	15 August 1940	—	—
Valentin Dietz	Heer	Hauptmann	Commander of the I./Jäger-Regiment 204	30 December 1943	—	—
Constantin Baron Digeon von Monteton	Heer	Generalmajor (Note: According to Scherzer as Oberst.)	Commander of the Armee-Waffenschule Panzer AOK 3	14 August 1944*	Killed in action 27 June 1944	—
Bruno Dilley+	Luftwaffe	Hauptmann	Gruppenkommandeur of the I./Sturzkampfgeschwader 2 "Immelmann"	4 June 1942	Awarded 174th Oak Leaves 8 January 1943	—
Fritz Dilz	Heer	Oberfeldwebel	Zugführer (platoon leader) in the 7./Panzergrenadier-Regiment 5	18 January 1945	—	—
Joseph Dimming	Heer	Unteroffizier	Group leader in the 14.(Panzerjäger)/Divisions-Gruppe 112 (Note: According to Scherzer as group leader in the 14./Divisions-Gruppe 112.)	21 February 1944	—	—
Fritz Dinger	Luftwaffe	Leutnant	Staffelführer of the 4./Jagdgeschwader 53	23 December 1942	—	—
Ulrich Dinkelaker	Heer	Oberst	Commander of Artillerie-Regiment 36 (motorized)	9 December 1943	—	—
Oskar Dinort+	Luftwaffe	Major	Geschwaderkommodore of Sturzkampfgeschwader 2 "Immelmann" (Note: According to Scherzer as Gruppenkommandeur of the I./Sturzkampfgeschwader 2 "Immelmann".)	20 June 1940	Awarded 21st Oak Leaves 14 July 1941	—
Wilhelm Dipberger	Luftwaffe	Fahnenjunker-Oberfeldwebel	Observer in the Stab/Kampfgeschwader 6	9 January 1945	—	—
Josef Dirkmorfeld	Heer	Obergefreiter	Group leader in the 2./Pionier-Bataillon 208	12 March 1943	—	—
Dr. Oskar Dirlewanger	Waffen-SS	SS-Oberführer of the Reserves	Commander of SS-Brigade "Dirlewanger" (Note: According to Scherzer as commander of SS-Regiment "Dirlewanger".)	30 September 1944	—	
Hans Ditter	Heer	Oberfeldwebel	Company troop leader in the 1./Panzergrenadier-Regiment 7	11 December 1944	—	—
Johannes Dittfeld	Heer	Major	Commander of the I./Grenadier-Regiment 466 (Note: According to Scherzer as commander of the II./Grenadier-Regiment 466.)	11 July 1944	—	—
Heinrich Dittlof	Heer	Oberleutnant	Chief of the 9./Grenadier-Regiment 422	10 September 1944	—	—
Joachim Dittmer	Heer	Hauptmann	Commander of the I./Panzergrenadier-Regiment 3	3 April 1943	—	—
Dr.-jur. Stefan Dittrich	Heer	Oberleutnant of the Reserves	Chief of the 4./leichtes Artillerie-Regiment 46	4 June 1944	—	—
Kurt Dix	Heer	Feldwebel	Company troop leader in the 3./Grenadier-Regiment 510	31 March 1943	—	—
Karl Dixius	Heer	Hauptmann	Commander of the I./Jäger-Regiment 229	26 November 1944	—	—
Hans Dobberkau	Heer	Leutnant of the Reserves	Leader of the 7./Grenadier-Regiment 284	21 September 1944	—	—
Werner Dobberstein	Kriegsmarine	Kapitänleutnant	Chief of the 5. Räumbootflottille	4 September 1941	—	—
[Dr.] Kurt Dobratz (Note: The brackets around the doctor title [Dr.] denotes that the academic title was attained after the Knight's Cross of the Iron Cross was awarded.)	Kriegsmarine	Kapitän zur See	Commander of U-1232	23 January 1945	—	—
Anton Döbele	Luftwaffe	Oberfeldwebel	Pilot in the 3./Jagdgeschwader 54 (Note: According to Scherzer as pilot in the 1./Jagdgeschwader 54.)	26 March 1944*	Killed in action 11 November 1943	—
Hans Döbrich	Luftwaffe	Feldwebel	Pilot in the 6./Jagdgeschwader 5	19 September 1943	—	—
Diethelm von Doemming? (Note: According to Scherzer the spelling of his last name is "von Doemming" and not "von Demming". There is no evidence in the German Federal Archives nor in the files of the Association of Knight's Cross Recipients (AKCR). The presentation was made by the former commander of the 26. Panzer-Division Generalleutnant Viktor Linnarz in the prisoner of war camp at Ghedi, in Italy, which makes it an unlawful presentation.)	Heer	Major	Commander of the II./Panzergrenadier-Regiment 9	30 April 1945*	Killed in action 29 April 1945	—
Fritz Doench	Luftwaffe	Major	Gruppenkommandeur of the I./Kampfgeschwader 30	14 June 1940 (Note: According to Scherzer on 19 June 1940.)	—	—
Hans-Günther Doenicke	Heer	Hauptmann	Commander of the I./Grenadier-Regiment 71 (motorized)	27 July 1944*	Killed in action 1 July 1944	—
Karl Dönitz+	Kriegsmarine	Konteradmiral	Befehlshaber der U-Boote (B.d.U.)	21 April 1940	Awarded 223rd Oak Leaves 6 April 1943	
Jost Dörfel	Heer	Oberfeldwebel	Zugführer (platoon leader) in the 6./Infanterie-Regiment 439	4 March 1942	—	—
Georg Dörffel+	Luftwaffe	Oberleutnant	Staffelkapitän of the 5.(S)/Lehrgeschwader 2	21 August 1941	Awarded 231st Oak Leaves 14 April 1943	
Walter Dörflinger	Heer	Oberleutnant of the Reserves	Deputy leader of the II./Grenadier-Regiment 332	7 April 1944	—	—
Hans-Joachim Doergens	Heer	Hauptmann of the Reserves	Leader of Pionier-Bataillon 225	26 June 1944	—	—
Alfred Doering	Heer	Oberfeldwebel	Leader of the 11./Grenadier-Regiment 6	2 February 1944	—	—
Arnold Döring	Luftwaffe	Leutnant	Pilot in the 10./Nachtjagdgeschwader 3	17 April 1945	—	—
Bernd von Doering	Heer	Major	Commander of the II./Schützen-Regiment 79	30 November 1940	—	—
Ernst Doering	Heer	Rittmeister	Commander of Divisions-Füsilier-Bataillon (A.A.) 329	16 March 1944	—	—
Johann Döring	Heer	Oberfeldwebel	Messenger squadron leader in the I./Grenadier-Regiment 958	5 April 1945	—	—
Wilhelm Döring	Luftwaffe	Leutnant	Observer in the 2./Kampfgeschwader 53 "Legion Condor"	19 February 1943	—	—
Hans-Wilhelm Doering-Manteuffel	Luftwaffe	Oberst	Commander of Flak-Regiment 101 (motorized) (Note: According to Scherzer as commander of Flak-Regiment (motorized) 10.)	10 September 1944	—	—
Friedrich Dörmann	Heer	Hauptmann zur Verwendung (for disposition)	Commander of the II./Grenadier-Regiment 528	18 January 1944	—	—
Karl Dörmann	Heer	Leutnant	Leader of the 9./Artillerie-Regiment 1542	9 February 1945	—	—
Werner Dörnbrack+	Luftwaffe	Oberleutnant	Staffelkapitän of the 4.(S)/Lehrgeschwader 2 (Note: According to Scherzer as Staffelkapitän of the 6.(S)/Lehrgeschwader 2.)	21 August 1941	Awarded 660th Oak Leaves 25 November 1944	—
Heinrich Dörnemann	Heer	Major	Commander of Panzer-Aufklärungs-Abteilung 16	28 November 1943	—	—
Helmut Dörner+	Waffen-SS	SS-Sturmbannführer and Major of the Schupo	Commander of the II./SS-Polizei-Schützen-Regiment 2	15 May 1942	Awarded 650th Oak Leaves 16 November 1944; 129th Swords 1 February 1945	—
Franz Dörr	Luftwaffe	Hauptmann (Note: According to Scherzer as Oberleutnant and Staffelkapitän of the 7./Jagdgeschwader 5.)	Gruppenkommandeur of the III./Jagdgeschwader 5	19 August 1944	—	—
Helmut Dörries	Luftwaffe	Fahnenjunker-Oberfeldwebel	Observer in the 2.(F)/Aufklärungs-Gruppe 123 (Note: According to Scherzer as observer in the Aufklärungsstaffel 2.(F)/123.)	27 July 1944	—	—
Josef Dörries	Heer	Unteroffizier	Group leader in the 6./Grenadier-Regiment 87	5 April 1944	—	—
Franz Doff	Heer	Gefreiter	Group leader of the 10./Gebirgsjäger-Regiment 98	20 July 1942	—	—
Herbert Dohle	Heer	Hauptmann	Leader of the II./Grenadier-Regiment 317	28 November 1943	—	—
Friedrich Dollmann+	Heer	General der Artillerie	Commander-in-chief of the 7. Armee	24 June 1940	Awarded 518th Oak Leaves 1 July 1944	
René Dollwet	Heer	Leutnant of the Reserves	Leader of the 2./Grenadier-Regiment 485	29 February 1944	—	—
Erich Domaschk	Heer	Hauptmann	Leader of the II./Panzergrenadier-Regiment 103	3 November 1942	—	—
Joachim Domaschk+	Heer	Oberleutnant	Leader of the I./Panzergrenadier-Regiment 108	12 October 1943	Awarded 496th Oak Leaves 11 June 1944	—
Kurt Dombacher? (Note: Kurt Dombacher's nomination by the troop was processed by the Oberkommando der Luftwaffe/Auszeichnung und Disziplin (OKL/AuD—Air Force High Command/Award and Discipline) on 15 April 1945. This nomination, now recommending approval, was forwarded on 16 April with a Luftwaffenpersonalamt-Verleihungsvorschlag (LPA-VV—Air Force Staff Office Nomination Recommendation) Nr. 1576 to the adjutancy of Hermann Göring. The nomination was never finalized and was left unfinished by the end of the war. A presentation of the Knight's Cross of the Iron Cross cannot be verified. The presentation date of 7 April 1945 as listed by Ernst Obermaier, author of Die Ritterkreuzträger der Luftwaffe Jagdflieger 1939–1945—The Bearers of the Knight's Cross of the Fighter Force 1939–1945, must be incorrect. The presentation date of 8 April 1945 as listed by the Walther-Peer Fellgiebel is an assumption of the Association of Knight's Cross Recipients.)	Luftwaffe	Leutnant	Pilot in the 1./Jagdgeschwader 51 "Mölders"	8 April 1945	—	—
Kurt Dombrowski	Heer	Major (Note: According to Scherzer as Major of the Reserves.)	Commander of the II./Sicherungs-Regiment 360	17 December 1944	—	—
Hans Dominik	Kriegsmarine	Fregattenkapitän	Chief of the 9. Torpedobootflottille	28 December 1944	—	—
Otto Dommeratzky+	Luftwaffe	Oberfeldwebel	Pilot in the 8./Schlachtgeschwader 1	5 January 1943	Awarded 665th Oak Leaves 25 November 1944	—
Wilhelm Dommes	Kriegsmarine	Kapitänleutnant	Commander of U-431	2 December 1942	—	—
Otto Domrich	Heer	Hauptmann	Commander of the I./Panzergrenadier-Regiment 2	8 August 1943	—	—
Gottfried Donat	Heer	Oberleutnant of the Reserves	Chief of the 5./Grenadier-Regiment 519	24 April 1943	—	—
Georg Donhauser	Heer	Oberfeldwebel	Zugführer (platoon leader) in the 1./Infanterie-Regiment 501	26 September 1941	—	—
Anton Donnhauser	Heer	Hauptmann	Commander of the II./Panzergrenadier-Regiment 111	18 July 1943	—	—
Rudolf Donth	Luftwaffe	Feldwebel	Leader of the 6./Fallschirmjäger-Regiment 4	14 January 1945	—	
Paul Dorenbeck	Heer	Oberst	Commander of Grenadier-Regiment 170	4 June 1944	—	—
Hans Dorfmeister	Heer	Oberleutnant of the Reserves	Chief of the 1./Grenadier-Regiment 355	16 October 1944	—	—
Hermann Dormann	Heer	Hauptmann	Commander of the II./Panzergrenadier-Regiment 64 (Note: According to Scherzer as commander of the II.(gepanzert)/Panzergrenadier-Regiment 64.)	4 January 1943	—	—
Heinrich Dorn	Heer	Oberst	Commander of Grenadier-Regiment 7	16 November 1944	—	—
Otto Dorow	Heer	Oberstleutnant	Commander of Infanterie-Regiment 514	3 April 1942	—	—
Hans Dorr+	Waffen-SS	SS-Hauptsturmführer	Chief of the 4./SS-Infanterie-Regiment "Germania"	27 September 1942	Awarded 327th Oak Leaves 13 November 1943; 77th Swords 9 July 1944	—
Walter Dorsch	Heer	Feldwebel	Company troop leader in the 14./Grenadier-Regiment 544	14 April 1945	—	—
Hans Dortenmann	Luftwaffe	Oberleutnant	Staffelkapitän of the 3./Jagdgeschwader 26 "Schlageter"	20 April 1945	—	—
Paul Dose	Luftwaffe	Oberleutnant	Staffelkapitän of the 9./Sturzkampfgeschwader 2 "Immelmann"	4 May 1944	—	—
Otto Doser	Heer	Oberjäger	Zugführer (platoon leader) in the 7./Jäger-Regiment 75	14 March 1943	—	—
Willi Dous	Luftwaffe	Oberleutnant	Pilot in the 8./Kampfgeschwader 3 "Lützow"	5 July 1941	—	—
Paul Dowerk	Heer	Oberleutnant	Chief of the 5./Infanterie-Regiment 215	15 January 1942	—	—
Günther Drange	Heer	Oberst	Commander of Grenadier-Regiment 428	16 October 1944	—	—
Johannes Dratwa	Heer	Hauptmann of the Reserves	Chief of the 2./Sturmgeschütz-Brigade 184	5 March 1945	—	—
Sepp Draxenberger? (Note: No evidence of the award can be found in the German Federal Archives. The award was unlawfully presented by SS-Oberstgruppenführer Sepp Dietrich. The date is taken from the announcement made by the 6. SS-Panzerarmee. Draxenberger was a member of the Association of Knight's Cross Recipients (AKCR).)	Waffen-SS	SS-Hauptscharführer	Platoon leander in the Stabskompanie/SS-Panzer-Regiment 5 "Wiking"	17 April 1945	—	—
Moritz von Drebber	Heer	Oberst	Commander of Infanterie-Regiment 523	30 June 1942	—	—
Gerhard Drechsler	Heer	Feldwebel	Zugführer (platoon leader) in the 3./Divisions-Füsilier-Bataillon 14	11 April 1944	—	—
Karl-Heinz Drees	Heer	Gefreiter	Richtschütze (gunner) in the 14.(Panzerjäger)/Grenadier-Regiment 552 (Note: According to Scherzer as Richtschütze (gunner) in the 14./Grenadier-Regiment 552.)	8 February 1944	—	—
Johann Dreher	Luftwaffe	Oberleutnant	Pilot in the 5./Kampfgeschwader 53 "Legion Condor"	5 April 1944	—	—
Franz-Joseph Dreike? (Note: No evidence of the award can be found in the German Federal Archives. The award was unlawfully presented by SS-Oberstgruppenführer Sepp Dietrich. The date is taken from the announcement made by the 6. SS-Panzerarmee. Franz Josef Dreike was a member of the Association of Knight's Cross Recipients (AKCR).)	Waffen-SS	SS-Hauptsturmführer of the Reserves	Commander of SS-Flak-Abteilung 2 "Das Reich"	6 May 1945	—	—
Dipl.-Ing. Paul Drekmann	Heer	Generalleutnant	Commander of the 252. Infanterie-Division	28 March 1945	—	—
Georg-Wilhelm Drescher	Luftwaffe	Oberleutnant of the Reserves	Chief of the Stabskompanie/Jäger-Regiment 24 (L)	1 February 1945	—	—
Otto Drescher	Heer	Generalleutnant	Commander of the 267. Infanterie-Division	6 April 1944	—	—
Bernhard Dresel	Heer	Hauptmann of the Reserves	Commander of the I./Grenadier-Regiment 326	3 November 1944	—	—
Albert Dressel	Heer	Feldwebel	Zugführer (platoon leader) in the 3./Panzer-Abteilung 160	13 October 1942	—	—
Dr.-jur. Heinrich Heinrich Drewes	Heer	Major of the Reserves	Commander of Kradschützen-Bataillon 10	24 April 1943	—	—
Martin Drewes+	Luftwaffe	Hauptmann	Gruppenkommandeur of the III./Nachtjagdgeschwader 1 (Note: According to Scherzer as leader of the III./Nachtjagdgeschwader 1.)	27 July 1944	Awarded 839th Oak Leaves 17 April 1945	
Wilhelm Drewes+	Heer	Hauptmann	Leader of the I./Panzergrenadier-Regiment 13	27 October 1943	Awarded 458th Oak Leaves 20 April 1944	—
Hans Drexel	Waffen-SS	SS-Obersturmführer	Deputy leader of the II./SS-Panzergrenadier-Regiment "Westland"	14 October 1943	—	—
Johann Drexel	Heer	Unteroffizier	Gun leader of the 14.(Panzerjäger)/Grenadier-Regiment 408 (Note: According to Scherzer as gun leader of the 14./Grenadier-Regiment 408.)	23 August 1943	—	—
Josef Drexel	Heer	Oberst of the Reserves	Commander of Grenadier-Regiment 436	27 August 1944	—	—
Hans Drexler	Heer	Major	Commander of the III./Grenadier-Regiment 232	14 August 1943	—	—
Hans Drexler	Heer	Hauptmann	Chief of the 4./Panzer-Aufklärungs-Abteilung 129	12 January 1945	—	—
Oskar Drexler? (Note: No evidence of the award can be found in the German Federal Archives. Presumably the award was presented by SS-Oberstgruppenführer Sepp Dietrich which would make it an unlawful presentation. The date was assumed by Fellgiebel. Von Seemen also states the 6 May 1945. The author Veit Scherzer was denied access to files, which could help clarify the case, of the Association of Knight's Cross Recipients (AKCR) on the grounds of the Bundesarchivgesetz (German Archive Law). Oskar Drexler was a member of the AKCR.)	Waffen-SS	SS-Obersturmbannführer	Commander of the SS-Panzer-Artillerie-Regiment 12 "Hitlerjugend"	6 May 1945	—	—
Walter Drexler	Waffen-SS	SS-Sturmbannführer	Commander of SS-Aufklärungs-Abteilung 8 "Florian Geyer" (Note: According to Scherzer as commander of SS-Aufklärungs-Abteilung 8.)	11 December 1944	—	—
Georg Dreyer	Heer	Oberstleutnant	Commander of Grenadier-Regiment 1053	5 November 1944	—	—
Kurt Drössiger	Heer	Gefreiter	Machine gunner in the 4./Infanterie-Regiment 415	10 February 1942	—	—
Herbert Droitsch	Heer	Oberleutnant of the Reserves	Chief of the 1./Grenadier-Regiment 187	25 January 1945	—	—
Hubertus Drolshage	Heer	Leutnant of the Reserves	Zugführer (platoon leader) in the Panzer-Jäger-Abteilung 41 (self-motorized) (Note: According to Scherzer as Zugführer (platoon leader) in the Panzer-Jäger-Abteilung 41.)	6 April 1944	—	—
Franz Drolshagen	Heer	Unteroffizier	Group leader of the 5./Grenadier-Regiment 698	16 October 1944	—	—
Hermann Dropmann	Heer	Oberstleutnant	Leader of Grenadier-Regiment 1050	12 July 1944	—	—
Leo Drossel	Heer	Hauptmann	Commander of the III./Infanterie-Regiment 102	19 July 1940	—	—
Hans Droste	Heer	Leutnant	Shock troops leader in the 7./Infanterie-Regiment 124	13 June 1941	—	—
Hans Drude	Heer	Oberfeldwebel	Zugführer (platoon leader) in the 1./Panzergrenadier-Regiment 14	10 February 1945	—	—
Wilhelm Drüke	Heer	Oberstleutnant	Commander of Grenadier-Regiment 294	30 December 1944	—	—
Ernst-Georg Drünkler	Luftwaffe	Hauptmann	Staffelkapitän of the 1./Nachtjagdgeschwader 5	20 March 1945	—	—
Alfred Druffner+	Heer	Oberstleutnant	Commander of Grenadier-Regiment 519	6 April 1943	Awarded 343rd Oak Leaves 30 November 1943	—
Alfred Druschel+	Luftwaffe	Oberleutnant	Staffelkapitän of the 2.(S)/Lehrgeschwader 2 (Note: According to Scherzer as Staffelkapitän of the 4.(S)/Lehrgeschwader 2.)	21 August 1941	Awarded 118th Oak Leaves 3 September 1942; 24th Swords 19 February 1943	
Albert Dubicki	Heer	Unteroffizier	Vorgeschobener Beobachter (artillery observer) in the 1./Werfer-Regiment 14	12 August 1944	—	—
Karl Dubigk	Heer	Hauptmann of the Reserves	Leader of Divisions-Füsilier-Bataillon 131	18 November 1944	—	—
Gerhard Dudeck	Luftwaffe	Hauptmann	Gruppenkommandeur of the III./Transportgeschwader 2	9 June 1944	—	—
Rolf Düe	Heer	Hauptmann of the Reserves	Chief of the 1./Panzer-Jäger-Abteilung 19	23 March 1945	—	—
Ernst Düllberg	Luftwaffe	Major	Gruppenkommandeur of the III./Jagdgeschwader 27	20 July 1944	—	—
Friedrich Dünkel	Luftwaffe	Hauptmann	Pilot in the 2./Nahaufklärungs-Gruppe "Tannenberg" (Note: According to Scherzer as pilot in the 2./Nahaufklärungs-Gruppe 12.)	28 April 1945	—	—
Edgar Dünker	Heer	Hauptmann	Commander of the I./Infanterie-Regiment 336	31 December 1941*	Died of wounds 29 December 1941	—
Joachim Dünkler	Heer	Major	Commander of the I./Panzergrenadier-Regiment 7	18 February 1945	—	—
Lothar Dünser	Luftwaffe	Oberleutnant	Chief of the 8./Flak-Regiment 38 (motorized)	26 August 1943*	Died of wounds 14 August 1943	—
Herbert Düppenbecker	Heer	Hauptmann	Commander of the I./Panzergrenadier-Regiment 79	4 October 1944	—	—
Wilhelm Dürbeck	Luftwaffe	Hauptmann	Staffelkapitän of the 8.(K)/Lehrgeschwader 1	3 December 1940	—	
Emil Dürr	Waffen-SS	SS-Unterscharführer	Gun leader in the 4.(schweres)/SS-Panzergrenadier-Regiment 26 "Hitlerjugend"	23 August 1944*	Killed in action 27 June 1944	—
[Dr.] Alfred Dürrwanger	Heer	Hauptmann	Chief of the 10.(schweres)/Jäger-Regiment 83	10 July 1942	—	—
Alwin Düskow	Heer	Hauptmann (Note: According to Scherzer as Hauptmann of the Reserves.)	Commander of the II./Artillerie-Regiment 295	21 March 1942	—	—
Peter Düttmann	Luftwaffe	Leutnant	Pilot in the 5./Jagdgeschwader 52	9 June 1944	—	—
Walter Düvert	Heer	Generalmajor	Commander of the 13. Panzer-Division	30 July 1941	—	—
Klaus Düwell	Heer	Oberleutnant	Chief of the 12./Gebirgsjäger-Regiment 137	19 November 1941	—	—
Günther Dumke	Heer	Hauptmann of the Reserves	Commander of the II./Grenadier-Regiment 283	6 March 1944*	Killed in action 28 January 1944	—
Andreas Dumßner	Heer	Unteroffizier	Group leader in the 3./Grenadier-Regiment 423	16 January 1945	—	—
Christoph Duncker	Heer	Leutnant of the Reserves	Leader of the 2./Pionier-Bataillon 158	21 November 1942	—	—
Konrad Dunkel	Heer	Major	Commander of Panzer-Jäger-Abteilung 1542	28 February 1945*	Died of wounds 20 February 1945	—
Wilhelm Durchdenwald	Heer	Oberleutnant	Leader of the II./Infanterie-Regiment 544	13 November 1942*	Killed in action 17 August 1942	—
Franz Dutter	Heer	Major	Commander of the II./Grenadier-Regiment 2	20 March 1944	—	—
Werner Duve	Heer	Major	Leader of Grenadier-Regiment 183	2 February 1945	—	—
Adam Dyroff	Heer	Major	Commander of the III./Panzergrenadier-Regiment 115	11 December 1944	—	—
