= 280th Division =

280th Division may refer to:

- 280th Infantry Division, Wehrmacht, Germany
- 280th Rifle Division, Soviet Union

== See also ==
- List of military divisions by number
