= Felix Becker =

Felix Becker may refer to:

- Felix Becker (art historian) (1864–1928), German art historian
- Felix Becker (fencer) (born 1964), German fencer
- Felix Becker (officer) (1893–1979), German military officer
