= 274th Infantry Division =

German WWII infantry division

The 274th Infantry Division (German: 274. Infanterie-Division) was an infantry division of the German Heer during World War II.

== History ==
The 274th Infantry Division's assembly was ordered on 26 May 1943 and began on 1 July. It was formed in occupied Norway as a static (i.e. non-motorized) formation. The division's initial commander was Wilhelm Russwurm. Its initial two regiments, numbered 862 and 865, as well as its artillery regiment were assembled from the battalions and detachments of other divisions in Norway:

- The battalions of Grenadier Regiment 862 were previously the second battalion of Grenadier Regiment 730 (710th Infantry Division), the first battalion of Grenadier Regiment 355 (214th Infantry Division), and the second battalion of Grenadier Regiment 469 (269th Infantry Division).
- The battalions of Grenadier Regiment 865 were previously the third battalion of Fusilier Regiment 334 (181st Infantry Division), the third battalion of Grenadier Regiment 340 (196th Infantry Division), and the third battalion of Grenadier Regiment 345 (199th Infantry Division).
- The three detachments of Artillery Regiment 274 were previously the second detachment of Artillery Regiment 214 (230th Infantry Division), the second detachment of Artillery Regiment 269 (269th Infantry Division), and the third detachment of Artillery Regiment 222 (181st Infantry Division).

The Grenadier Regiments 862 and 865 were also alternatively called Fortress Infantry Regiments in the German military postal service.

On 27 October 1944, Kurt Weckmann took command of the division.

The division did not see combat until German surrender. Subsequently, it was taken prisoner by British forces.

== Superior formations ==
Organizational chart of the 274th Infantry Division
Year	Month	Army Corps	Army	Army Group	Area
1943	July – August	Army reserves (assembly).	Armee Norwegen	None.	Stavanger
1943	September – December	LXX Army Corps	Armee Norwegen	None.	Stavanger
1944	January – December	LXX Army Corps	Armee Norwegen	None.	Stavanger
1945	January – April	LXX Army Corps	20th Mountain Army	None.	Stavanger

== Noteworthy individuals ==
- Wilhelm Russwurm, divisional commander between 26 May 1943 and 27 October 1944.
- Kurt Weckmann, divisional commander between 27 October 1944 and 8 May 1945.
