= 274th Division =

274th Division may refer to:

- 274th Infantry Division, Wehrmacht, Germany
- 274th Rifle Division, Soviet Union

== See also ==
- List of military divisions by number
