= Oskar-Hubert Dennhardt =

German Major in the Wehrmacht

- Born: 30 June 1915; Markranstädt, Amtshauptmannschaft Leipzig, Kingdom of Saxony, German Empire
- Died: 19 June 2014 (aged 98); Schmalfeld, Schleswig-Holstein, Germany
- Relatives: ∞ 1943 Christel Neubauer; 1 son
- Military career
- Allegiance: Weimar Republic; Nazi Germany; West Germany
- Branch: Reichswehr; Army; Bundeswehr
- Service years: 1934–35; 1935–45; 1955–71
- Rank: Major (Wehrmacht); Brigadegeneral (Bundeswehr)
- Commands: Grenadier-Regiment 11; Grenadier-Regiment 1141; Grenadier-Regiment 1143; Panzergrenadierbrigade 16 (BW)
- Conflicts: World War II: Poland Campaign; Western Campaign; Operation Barbarossa
- Awards: Knight's Cross of the Iron Cross
- Other work: Politician

Oskar-Hubert Heinrich Dennhardt (30 June 1915 – 19 June 2014) was a German Major in the Wehrmacht during World War II. He was a recipient of the Knight's Cross of the Iron Cross with Oak Leaves of Nazi Germany. Wounded and seriously ill, he was evacuated from Königsberg to Schleswig on one of the last ships. In June 1945, POW Dennhardt was released from captivity directly from a military hospital in Schleswig.

Dennhardt served in the Landtag of Schleswig-Holstein as a Christian Democratic Union politician after World War II. He rejoined the military service in the West German Bundeswehr on 16 December 1955, retiring on 30 June 1971 holding the rank of Brigadegeneral. He commanded the Panzergrenadierbrigade 16 from 1 November 1965 to 31 March 1968 and was deputy commander of the 6th Panzergrenadier Division.

== Promotions ==
- 20 May 1934 Fahnenjunker (Officer Candidate)
- 1 November 1934 Fahnenjunker-Gefreiter (Officer Candidate with Lance Corporal rank)
- 1 December 1934 Fahnenjunker-Unteroffizier (Officer Candidate with Corporal/NCO/Junior Sergeant rank)
- 1 June 1935 Fähnrich (Officer Cadet)
- 25 October 1935 Oberfähnrich (Senior Officer Cadet) with effect from 1 October 1935
- 20 April 1936 Leutnant (2nd Lieutenant) with effect and Rank Seniority (RDA) from 1 April 1936 (1144)
- 31 March 1939 Oberleutnant (1st Lieutenant) with effect and RDA from 1 April 1939 (421)
- 15 February 1942 Hauptmann (Captain) with effect and RDA from 1 March 1942 (333)
- 1 November 1943 Major (141)

=== Bundeswehr ===
- 16 December 1955 Major
- 4 July 1956 Oberstleutnant (Lieutenant Colonel)
- 3 February 1961 Oberst (Colonel)
- 2 April 1968 Brigadegeneral (Brigadier General; one-star General) with effect from 1 April 1968

== Awards and decorations ==
- Wehrmacht Long Service Award, 4th Class on 28 May 1938
- Iron Cross (1939), 2nd and 1st Class
  - 2nd Class on 2 June 1940
  - 1st Class on 8 September 1940
- Wound Badge (1939) in Black, Silver and Gold
  - Black on 26 August 1941
  - Silver on 29 August 1942
  - Gold on 5 October 1942 for his 5th wound on 9 September 1942
    - as of April 1944, he had been wounded 12 times, during April 1945, in the battle for East Prussia, he was wounded a 13th time.
- Infantry Assault Badge in Bronze on 1 May 1942
- Eastern Front Medal on 3 August 1942
- German Cross in Gold on 12 February 1943 as Hauptmann and Leader of the I./Grenadier-Regiment 53 (motorized)
- Close Combat Clasp in Bronze and Silver
  - Bronze on 6 December 1943
  - Silver on 15 April 1945
- Certificate of Recognition of the Commander-in-Chief of the Army on 14 February 1944
- Knight's Cross of the Iron Cross on 17 March 1944 as Major and deputy leader of Grenadier-Regiment 11/131. Infanterie-Division
- Order of Merit of the Federal Republic of Germany, Officer's Cross (Verdienstkreuz 1. Klasse, Cross of Merit 1st Class) on 10 May 1971

=== Knight's Cross with Oak Leaves ===
On 11 April 1945, Colonel Felix Becker, deputy commander of the 561st Volksgrenadier Division, nominated Major Dennhardt, delegated as of 8 April 1945 with the leadership of Grenadier-Regiment 1143, for the Oak Leaves. This nomination was directly transmitted from the division command post to the Personnel Office of the OKH.

Major Joachim Domaschk (OKH/PA/P 5a 1. Staffel), who processed the nomination at the Heerespersonalamt (HPA—Army Staff Office) from the troop (received and stamped on 19 April 1945), had sent a message to the AOK Ostpreußen under Dietrich von Saucken on 28 April 1945 requesting a statement (Stellungnahme) from the XXVI Army Corps (Wehrmacht) and the Army High Command East Prussia by telex. Further processing appears not to have taken place due to the chaos of the final battles, an approval was never received before the end of hostilities.

Oskar-Hubert Dennhardt is not listed in the book for the "nominations for the higher grades of the Knight's Cross of the Iron Cross" nor in the nomination book for Knight's Cross (starting with Nr. 5100). According to the Association of Knight's Cross Recipients (AKCR) the award was presented in accordance with the Dönitz-decree. This is illegal according to the Deutsche Dienststelle (WASt) and lacks legal justification. Military historians, on the other hand, state that awards by Reichspräsident Karl Dönitz are in fact justified. The sequential number "870" and the presentation date 9 May 1945 were assigned by the AKCR. Dennhardt was a member of the AKCR. Dennhardt never claimed to have been awarded the Oak Leaves; even his Bundeswehr ribbon bar only shows the ribbon of the Knight's Cross, not the Oak Leaves.

== Sources ==
- German Federal Archives: BArch PERS 6/301702 and RW 59/2894

Military offices
Preceded by Brigadegeneral Werner Ebeling	Commander of Panzergrenadierbrigade 16 (Bundeswehr); 1 November 1965 – 31 March 1968	Succeeded by Oberst Werner Manns
