= Bieganin =

- Village
- Location within Poland
- Coordinates: 51°45′N 17°45′E
- Country: Poland
- Voivodeship: Greater Poland
- County: Ostrów
- Gmina: Raszków

Bieganin [bjɛˈɡanin] is a village in the administrative district of Gmina Raszków, within Ostrów County, Greater Poland Voivodeship, in west-central Poland.

== Notable residents ==
- Walter Gorn (1898–1968), general
