= Walter Gorn =

- Gorn as Colonel
- Born: 24 September 1898; Bieganin, Posen, Kingdom of Prussia, German Empire
- Died: 10 July 1968 (aged 69); Rosenheim, West Germany
- Military career
- Allegiance: German Empire; Weimar Republic; Nazi Germany
- Branch: Army
- Service years: 1916–1945
- Rank: Generalmajor
- Commands: 561st Grenadier Division; 710th Infantry Division
- Conflicts: World War I World War II: Invasion of Poland; Battle of the Netherlands; Battle of France; Invasion of Yugoslavia; Operation Barbarossa; Battle of Voronezh; Battles of Rzhev; Operation Bagration; East Prussian offensive; Battle of Königsberg
- Awards: Knight's Cross of the Iron Cross with Oak Leaves and Swords; German Cross in Gold

Walter Gorn (24 September 1898 – 10 July 1968) was a highly decorated Generalmajor in the Wehrmacht of Nazi Germany during World War II who commanded several divisions. He was a recipient of the Knight's Cross of the Iron Cross with Oak Leaves and Swords.

A veteran of both world wars, Gorn began his career as Private with Grenadier Regiment on the Western Front in 1916, but was forced to leave the Army following the War. He then served as an officer for fifteen years with the Police units, before joined the newly established Wehrmacht in 1935. During the World War II, Gorn rose through the ranks and commanded battalion and regiment on the Eastern Front for three years, before he was selected for General's rank.

== Early years ==
Gorn was born on September 24, 1898, in the village of Bieganin, a part of the town of Pleszew near Posen as the son of farmer Ferdinand Gorn and his wife Anna. During the World War I, he enlisted the German Army and was assigned as Kriegsfreiwilliger (roughly equivalent to Private) to West Prussian Grenadier-Regiment „König Wilhelm I.“ Nr. 7 operating with 9th Division on the Western Front. Gorn saw combat on Verdun and Aisne, before he was transferred to replacement machine gun company of V Corps in July 1917.

After a brief period with that unit, Gorn was transferred to 1st Heavy Machine Gun company of 36th Landwehr-Assault-Infantry Regiment stationed in his native Posen. He remained in that capacity for the rest of the war and participated mostly in the training of replacement units. For his service during the War, Gorn was decorated with Prussian Iron Cross 2nd Class.

Following the Armistice, his unit was disbanded and Gorn joined the Freikorps, paramilitary units consisted of disgruntled and demobilized soldiers. He was assigned to the 2nd Company of 18th Volunteer-Regiment and took part in the combats against Red Army in Lithuania and Courland. Gorn was promoted to Gefreiter (Lance Corporal) in April 1919 and returned to Germany in July that year. He was promoted Unteroffizier (Corporal) on September 7 that year and discharged from the Army by the end of the month.

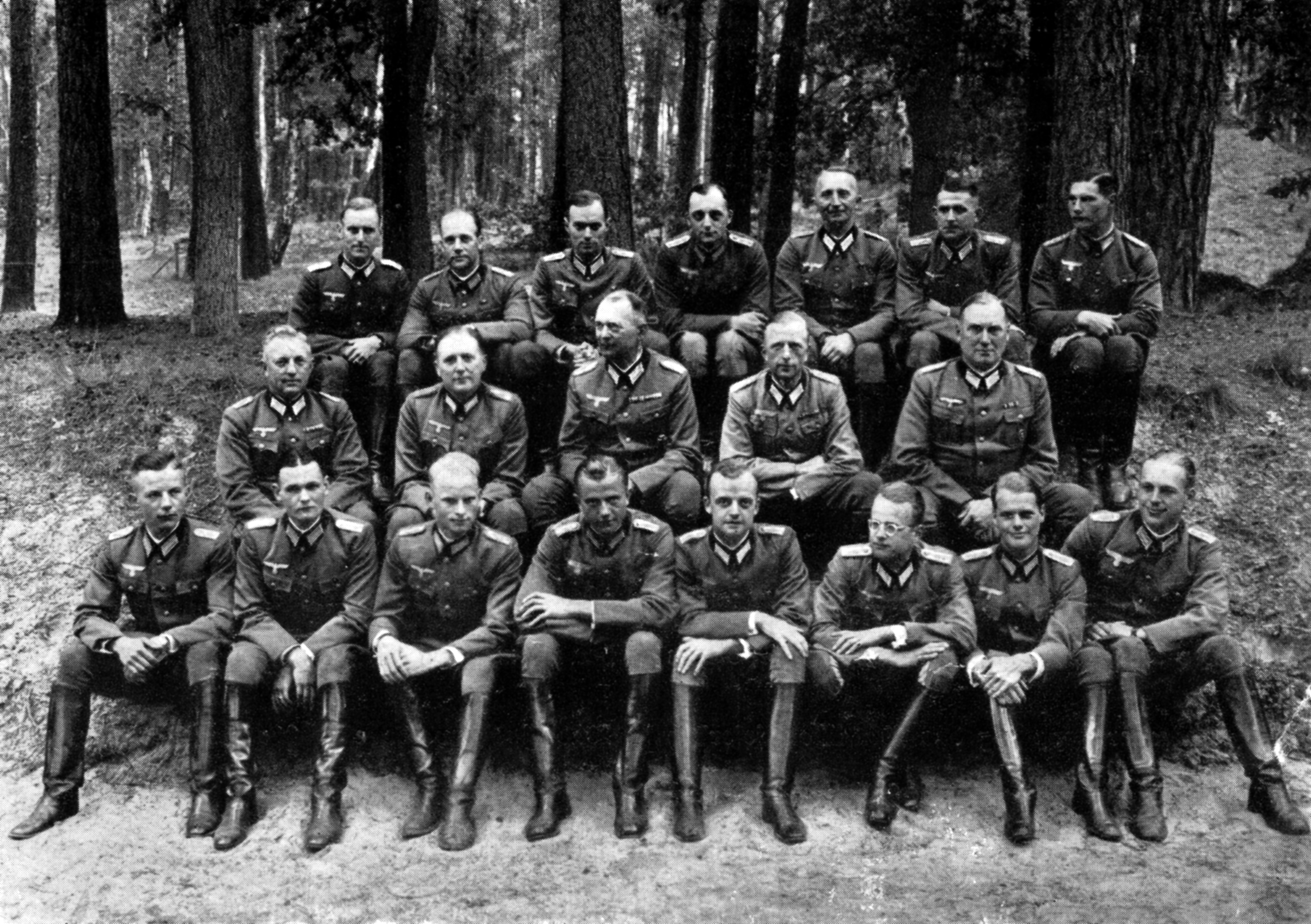
Gorn (middle row, 1st from left) with the officers of 3rd Motorcycle-Rifle-Battalion in July 1935.

In June 1920, Gorn joined the Schutzpolizei (Protection Police) as Unterwachtmeister (equivalent of Sergeant) and was stationed in Breslau for next seven years, reaching the rank of Oberwachtmeister (staff sergeant) in April 1923. While in this capacity, he completed several physical trainings and was selected for Police-Officer-Aspirant Course at the higher police school in Eiche near Potsdam in September 1925.

Upon completing the course one year later, Gorn rejoined his unit in Breslau and was commissioned Leutnant (second lieutenant) on April 29, 1927. He subsequently served as Platoon leader until November 1928, when he was transferred to the staff of Police Inspection East as Adjutant. Gorn was promoted to Oberleutnant (first lieutenant) in March 1929 and ordered to the Police School for training as District leader. He completed the training in December 1930 and entered the training course as Traffic-Officer and Motor Vehicle Driver with the Police Inspection for Technology and Traffic in Breslau.

Gorn completed all his instructions in April 1931 and served as Traffic-Officer in Breslau for three years, before assumed duty as Motor-Transport-Officer with the Police Department in Iserlohn, Westphalia in October 1934. He was promoted to Hauptmann (Captain) one month later and returned to Breslau in April 1935 as leader of the Motorcycle-Guards-Unit.

== World War II ==
Following the Adolf Hitler's rise to power and creation of Wehrmacht in mid-1935, Gorn's unit was incorporated into the Army and he assumed command of 5th Company of the 3rd Motorcycle-Rifle-Battalion under Obertsleutnant Günther von Manteuffel in Bad Freienwalde. His battalion became a part of the 3rd Panzer Division and Gorn became more involved in Armoured warfare. He participated in the occupation of Sudetenland in October 1938 and German occupation of Czechoslovakia in March 1939.

In July 1939, Gorn was transferred to the headquarters of newly created XIX. Army Motorised Corps under famous General Heinz Guderian and served as Commandant of the Staff-Quarters during the Invasion of Poland, receiving Clasp to the Iron Cross 2nd Class. He was promoted to Major in March 1940 and assumed command of 10th Rifle Replacement Battalion in Sankt Pölten, Lower Austria.

During the in Battle of the Netherlands in May 1940, his battalion was attached to 9th Panzer Division and Gorn later participated in the Battle of France. He was appointed commander of 1st Battalion, 10th Rifle Regiment in October 1940 and took part in the Invasion of Yugoslavia in early April 1941. Gorn distinguished himself on April 8 and received Iron Cross 1st Class for bravery. Only two weeks later, Gorn led his battalion during the advance on the town of Debar in North Macedonia. His orders were to establish contact with Italian troops in the city of Gostivar and his mixed unit overran a strong hostile resistance line and crushed seven enemy batteries. Another nine enemy batteries, twelve anti-tank guns and numerous additional war materiel was captured. His attack also liberated 800 Italian prisoners, which were armed and taken under command. For his leadership during the battle, Gorn was decorated with the Knight's Cross of the Iron Cross on April 20, 1941.

Gorn led his battalion during the German invasion of the Soviet Union in July 1941 and took part in combats at Uman and Kiev, Ukraine. He was promoted to Oberstleutnant (lieutenant colonel) in February 1942 and assumed command of 59th Motorcycle-Rifle-Battalion, operating also with 9th Panzer Division, one month later. For his previous service during the combats in Kursk Oblast and east Ukraine, Gorn received German Cross in Gold.

He was subsequently ordered with his Motorcycle Battalion north in order to reinforce German forces during the efforts to slow Soviet counteroffensives between Orel and Voronezh. Gorn and his unit repelled a number of strong soviets attacks during the fighting in Voronezh, but suffered heavy casualties leaving only 55 men combat effective by the end of August. For his service during that battle, he was decorated with the Oak Leaves to his Knight's Cross of the Iron Cross on August 17, 1942.

Gorn remained in command of the 59th Battalion until October that year, when he was appointed commanding officer of Panzer-Grenadier-Regiment 10 attached to 9th Panzer Division. His regiment participated in the Battles of Rzhev from November 1942 and repelled several Soviet breakthrough attempts, specifically near Sychyovka along the Vazuza river and south of Loshki, where Gorn distinguished himself again and contributed to his Division's freeing of the 129th Infantry Division and the destruction of cut-off enemy forces. For his service during that campaign, he was decorated with Swords to his Knight's Cross of the Iron Cross and also received Bulgarian Order of Bravery, IV. Class with swords.

In March 1943, Gorn was promoted to Oberst (Colonel) and ordered back to Germany, where he attended the tactical course at the Panzer Troops School in Wünsdorf near Berlin. He completed the course in September that year and assumed duty as commander of the training courses at the Panzer Troop School in Krampnitz. Gorn later assumed command of entire school and remained in that capacity until the end of July 1944.

He was subsequently ordered to Sensburg in East Prussia, where he was tasked with the activation of 561st Grenadier Division as new unit of 29th Aufstellungswelle (Draft Wave). His division was built from the training units stationed in East Prussia and reinforced from the remnants of other combat units previously destroyed in combat. Only a few days later, 561st Division was assigned to the 3rd Panzer Army and sent into combat against the Red Army in Lithuania. Gorn and his division were ordered to attack the Soviets during the ongoing Operation Bagration, a large strategic offensive, however they were pushed back and the Red Army destroyed 28 of 34 divisions of Army Group Centre and completely shattered the German front line.

His division was subsequently renamed to 561st Volksgrenadier Division, to build morale, appealing at once to nationalism (Volk) and Germany's older military traditions (Grenadier). Gorn remained in command until late September, when he was temporarily relieved of command due to illness. He spent three months in hospital and was promoted to Generalmajor on October 1, 1944.

Gorn returned to the command of 561st Division in December 1944 and participated in the defense of Tilsit and later took part in the defense of Königsberg. Unfortunately exhausted Gorn became ill again and was transported to the hospital by the beginning of March 1945. Königsberg was captured by the Red Army one month later and 561st Volksgrenadier Division totally destroyed. Gorn spent total of six weeks in hospital and assumed command of 710th Infantry Division, which was stationed in Austria after heavy fighting in Hungary in mid-April.

He commanded his new division during the final combats with Red Army in the area of Neulengbach and St. Pölten along the Danube river, before retreated to the town of Steyr in Upper Austria, where he surrendered his command to a United States Army unit on May 8, 1945.

== Postwar life ==
Gorn spent two years in allied captivity and was released in June 1947. He died on July 10, 1968, aged 69 in Rosenheim, Germany.

== Decorations ==
- Knight's Cross of the Iron Cross with Oak Leaves and Swords
  - Knight's Cross on 20 April 1941 as Major and commander of the 1st Battalion, 10th Schützen Regiment
  - 113th Oak Leaves on 17 August 1942 as Oberstleutnant and commander of 59th Krad-Schützen Battalion
  - 30th Swords on 8 June 1943 as Oberst and commander of 10th Panzergrenadier Regiment
- German Cross in Gold on 8 February 1942 as Major in the 9th Panzer Division
- Clasp to the Iron Cross (1939) 2nd Class (16 October 1939) & 1st Class (8 April 1941)
- Prussian Iron Cross (1914)
  - 2nd Class
- Panzer Badge in Bronze
- Eastern Front Medal
- Wound Badge (1939)
  - in Black
  - in Silver
- Close Combat Clasp
  - in Bronze
- Honour Cross of the World War 1914/1918
- Sudetenland Medal with Prague Castle Bar
- Wehrmacht Long Service Award, 1st Class
- Bulgarian Order of Bravery, 3rd Class
- Austrian War Commemorative Medal with Swords
- Hungarian War Commemorative Medal with Swords
- Bulgarian War Commemorative Medal with Swords

Military offices
Preceded by Generalleutnant Rudolf-Eduard Licht	Commander of 710th Infantry Division; April 15, 1945 – May 8, 1945	Succeeded by None
