= 561st Volksgrenadier Division =

561st Volksgrenadier Division 561st Grenadier Division
- 561. Volks-Grenadier Division Vehicle Insignia
- Active: 27 July–October 1944 (561. GD); 9 October 1944–April 1945 (561. VGD)
- Country: Nazi Germany
- Branch: Army
- Type: Grenadier
- Size: Division

The 561st Volksgrenadier Division (German: 561. Volksgrenadier-Division) was a division of the Wehrmacht active during World War II. When it was formed in July 1944, it was originally designated as the 561st Grenadier Division.

== History ==
The 561st Grenadier Division was raised in July 1944 and placed under the leadership of Major General Walter Gorn on 21 July 1944. The division was sent to occupy the central sector of the Eastern Front, which was rapidly diminishing due to the successes of the Soviet's Red Army.

In October 1944, re-designated the 561st Volksgrenadier Division, the two grenadier regiments participated in the Gumbinnen-Goldap Operation. From November 1944 to January 1945, the division was again stationed in Tilsit with the 3rd Panzer Army and experienced, among other things, the capture of Tilsit during the Battle of East Prussia.

From February 1945, it was deployed to the fortress of Königsberg, now as part of Army Group North.

In March/April 1945, part of the unit was encircled and destroyed by the Red Army during the Battle of Königsberg. Remnants of the division fought around Pillau in April and were assigned to the XXVI Army Corps.

== Regiments ==
- Grenadier-Regiment 1141: Major Schaper
  - later Lieutenant Colonel Oskar-Hubert Dennhardt
- Grenadier-Regiment 1142: Colonel Schirrmeister
- Grenadier-Regiment 1143: Colonel Kurt Erdmann-Degenhardt

== See also ==
- List of German divisions in World War II

== Commanding officers ==
The following officers commanded the 561st Volksgrenadier Division:

- Generalmajor Walter Gorn: 21 July 1944
- Colonel Felix Becker: 1 March 1945 – end of war (deputy commander)
