= Hans Drexler =

Swiss swimmer

Personal information
- Full name: Hans Drexler
- Nationality: Swiss

Sport
- Sport: Swimming

Hans Drexler was a Swiss freestyle swimmer. He competed in the men's 1500 metre freestyle event at the 1920 Summer Olympics.
