= 280th Infantry Division =

German WWII infantry division

The 280th Infantry Division (German: 280. Infanterie-Division) was an infantry division of the German Heer during World War II. Initially, the deployment of the 280th Infantry Division was ordered in May 1940, but aborted in June of that same year. The division was deployed a second time in 1942 and served in occupied Norway until 1945.

== History ==
=== First deployment, 1940 ===
On 22 May 1940, the divisions of the tenth Aufstellungswelle, including the 280th Infantry Division, were ordered to deploy by 1 July in anticipation of a prolonged campaign in the west. However, as France agreed to an armistice on 22 June, the divisions of the tenth wave were no longer necessary, and their deployment was aborted. The regiments initially intended for the 280th Infantry Division, the Infantry Regiments 556, 557, and 558, as well as the Artillery Detachment 280, returned to their reserve formations.

=== Second deployment, 1942 – 1945 ===
Another division named 280th Infantry Division was deployed on 22 April 1942 in the west of occupied Norway, in the Stavanger sector. The initial commander of the 280th Infantry Division was Karl Beeren, appointed on 27 April 1942.

The division was poorly equipped throughout its history; it had no reconnaissance, Panzerjäger, or field replacement formations, and its artillery consisted of four captured French 100mm guns.

In September 1943, the 280th Infantry Division consisted of the following elements:

- Fortress Battalion 655
- Fortress Battalion 657
- Fortress Battalion 666

In September 1944, the divisional headquarters were moved from Stavanger to Bergen.

On 10 November 1944, Beeren was replaced as divisional commander by Johann de Boer.

In early 1945, the 280th Infantry Division consisted of the following elements:

- Battalion 645
- Battalion 655
- Battalion 658
- Battalion 666
- Battalion 1015
- Fortress Battalion "A"
- Signal Company 280
- Supply Troops 280
- Panzer Company Bergen

On 9 May 1945, the day after German surrender, the division capitulated not having had seen any major combat between 1942 and 1945.

== Superior formations ==
Organizational chart of the 280th Infantry Division
Year	Month	Army Corps	Army	Army Group	Area
1942	May – December	LXX Army Corps	Armee Norwegen	None.	Stavanger
1943	January – December	LXX Army Corps	Armee Norwegen	None.	Stavanger
1944	January – August	LXX Army Corps	Armee Norwegen	None.	Stavanger
1944	September – December	LXX Army Corps	Armee Norwegen	None.	Bergen
1945	January – April	LXX Army Corps	20th Mountain Army	None.	Bergen

== Noteworthy individuals ==
- Karl Beeren, divisional commander between 27 April 1942 and 10 November 1944.
- Johann de Boer, divisional commander between 10 November 1944 and 9 May 1945.
