= Kurt Dombacher =

German World War II fighter pilot (1920–1993)

- Born: 9 February 1920; Untertürkheim, Weimar Republic
- Died: 8 October 1993 (aged 73); Rust, Germany
- Military career
- Allegiance: Nazi Germany (to 1945); West Germany
- Branch: Luftwaffe; German Air Force
- Service years: ?–1945; 1956–1970's
- Rank: Oberleutnant (Wehrmacht); Major (Bundeswehr)
- Units: JG 5 JG 51
- Conflicts: World War II: Eastern Front
- Awards: Knight's Cross of the Iron Cross

Kurt Dombacher (9 February 1920 – 8 October 1993) was a German Luftwaffe ace during World War II. Kurt Dombacher was credited with 68 victories in 800+ missions, with 1 over Western forces and 67 over Soviet forces. He was captured by Soviet forces in May 1945 and was held until 1950.

== World War II ==
On 10 September 1944, Dombacher was appointed Staffelkapitän (squadron leader) of 1. Staffel of Jagdgeschwader 51 (JG 51—51st Fighter Wing). He succeeded Leutnant Gerhard Mai who had temporarily led the Staffel after its former commander Hauptmann Joachim Brendel had been transferred on 2 September. Dombacher was awarded the Knight's Cross of the Iron Cross (Ritterkreuz des Eisernen Kreuzes) on 8 April 1945, ending the war with 68 aerial victories claimed.

== Later life ==
In 1958, Dombacher, together with Erwin Rohm, participated in the Deutschlandflug, a cross-country flight contest for pilots, flying a Piper PA-18 Super Cub. The two pilots finished in second place, behind Adolf Galland and Peter Erhardt flying a Klemm Kl 107.

== Summary of career ==
=== Aerial victory claims ===
According to US historian David T. Zabecki, Dombacher was credited with 68 aerial victories. Spick also lists him with 68 aerial victories claimed in approximately 300 combat missions. Mathews and Foreman, authors of Luftwaffe Aces — Biographies and Victory Claims, researched the German Federal Archives and found records for 68 aerial victory claims, 67 of which on the Eastern Front and one four-engined heavy bomber on the Western Front.

Victory claims were logged to a map-reference (PQ = Planquadrat), for example "PQ 35 Ost 34333". The Luftwaffe grid map (Jägermeldenetz) covered all of Europe, western Russia and North Africa and was composed of rectangles measuring 15 minutes of latitude by 30 minutes of longitude, an area of about 360 square miles (930 km^{2}). These sectors were then subdivided into 36 smaller units to give a location area 3 km × 4 km (1.9 mi × 2.5 mi) in size.

Chronicle of aerial victories
This and the ♠ (Ace of spades) indicates those aerial victories which made Dombacher an "ace-in-a-day", a term which designates a fighter pilot who has shot down five or more airplanes in a single day. This and the ? (question mark) indicates information discrepancies listed by Prien, Stemmer, Rodeike, Bock, Mathews and Foreman.
Claim	Date	Time	Type	Location	Claim	Date	Time	Type	Location
– 12. Staffel of Jagdgeschwader 1 – Action in south and west Norway — 1 January – 26 June 1942
1? (Note: This claim is not listed by Mathews and Foreman.)	3 April 1942	—	Spitfire	Trondheim Fjord					
– 10. Staffel of Jagdgeschwader 51 – Eastern Front — 4 February – 31 December 1943
2	10 June 1943	19:03	Pe-2	PQ 35 Ost 34333; 5 km (3.1 mi) east of Seschtschinskaja	14♠	14 August 1943	18:24	Il-2 m.H. (Note: The "m.H." refers to an Ilyushin Il-2 with rear gunner (mit Heckschütze).)	northeast of Schilow
3	30 June 1943	09:05	MiG-3	PQ 35 Ost 64322; 10 km (6.2 mi) south-southeast of Belyov	15	16 August 1943	18:26	La-5	southwest of Tschernezkii
4	6 July 1943	19:30	Boston	PQ 35 Ost 63843; 5 km (3.1 mi) southeast of Zolotukhino	16	18 August 1943	17:39	Il-2 m.H.	west of Savur-Mohyla
5	13 July 1943	13:43	Il-2 m.H.	PQ 35 Ost 63254; 15 km (9.3 mi) southeast of Zalegoshch	17	18 August 1943	17:43	Il-2 m.H.	northwest of Dmitriyevka
6	13 July 1943	14:08	Il-2 m.H.	PQ 35 Ost 63251; 15 km (9.3 mi) southeast of Zalegoshch	18	27 September 1943	10:28	Il-2 m.H.	south of Akimovka
7	17 July 1943	08:10	Il-2 m.H.	PQ 35 Ost 63564; 10 km (6.2 mi) southwest of Maloarkhangelsk	19	27 September 1943	10:29	Il-2 m.H.	east of Sagolitschki
8	5 August 1943	07:34	LaGG-3	west of Petrosselki	20	27 September 1943	16:08	Il-2 m.H.	northeast of Schulgowka
9	5 August 1943	07:40	Boston	southwest of Krassawka	21	27 September 1943	16:10	Il-2 m.H.	northeast of Gorodajewka
10♠	14 August 1943	18:14	Il-2 m.H.	east of Rakinoye	22	29 September 1943	14:35	Il-2 m.H.	west of Trozko
11♠	14 August 1943	18:16	Il-2 m.H.	east of Jkalowka	23	30 November 1943	08:29	Il-2 m.H.	PQ 34 Ost 49818; 30 km (19 mi) south-southwest of Dnepropetrovsk
12♠	14 August 1943	18:17	Il-2 m.H.	north of Kut	24	30 November 1943	13:23	La-5	PQ 34 Ost 49767; 55 km (34 mi) southwest of Dnepropetrovsk
13♠	14 August 1943	18:21	Il-2 m.H.	southwest of Ogulzy					
– 10. Staffel of Jagdgeschwader 51 – Eastern Front — 1 January – 14 August 1944
25	16 January 1944	13:10	La-5	PQ 25 Ost 90572; 40 km (25 mi) east-northeast of Vinnytsia	32	7 April 1944	17:49	Il-2	PQ 25 Ost 50814; 40 km (25 mi) south of Ternopil
26	24 January 1944	10:32	Il-2 m.H.	PQ 25 Ost 80662; 30 km (19 mi) east-northeast of Vinnytsia	33	22 April 1944	18:18	Yak-9	PQ 25 Ost 40681; 20 km (12 mi) south-southwest of Berezhany
27	24 January 1944	10:35	Il-2 m.H.	PQ 25 Ost 80632; 25 km (16 mi) south-southeast of Koziatyn	34	27 April 1944	15:34	Il-2 m.H.	PQ 24 Ost 59314; 20 km (12 mi) north of Kolomyia
28	24 January 1944	10:42	Il-2 m.H.	PQ 25 Ost 90513; 30 km (19 mi) south-southeast of Koziatyn	35?	1 May 1944	17:10	Il-2 m.H.	PQ 24 Ost 59173
29	25 January 1944	10:37	Il-2 m.H.	PQ 25 Ost 80634; 25 km (16 mi) south-southeast of Koziatyn	36	7 July 1944	14:55	Yak-9	PQ 25 Ost 44816; 10 km (6.2 mi) west of Kovel
30	25 January 1944	10:42? (Note: According to Mathews and Foreman claimed at 10:43.)	Il-2 m.H.	PQ 25 Ost 90371; 25 km (16 mi) south-southeast of Koziatyn	37	1 August 1944	10:43	La-5	PQ 25 Ost 35315; 20 km (12 mi) north of Mariiampil
31	7 April 1944	14:23	Il-2	PQ 25 Ost 50641; 20 km (12 mi) south of Ternopil	38	1 August 1944	11:15	Yak-9	PQ 25 Ost 35345; 20 km (12 mi) west-northwest of Mariiampil
– 13. Staffel of Jagdgeschwader 51 – Eastern Front — 15 August – 9 September 1944
39♠	15 August 1944	14:45	Yak-9	PQ 25 Ost 25297; 25 km (16 mi) east of Blumenfeld	43♠	15 August 1944	18:27	La-5	PQ 25 Ost 35342; 20 km (12 mi) west-northwest of Mariiampil
40♠	15 August 1944	14:50	Il-2 m.H.	PQ 25 Ost 35155; 35 km (22 mi) north of Mariiampil	44	17 August 1944	07:00	Il-2 m.H.	PQ 25 Ost 36331; 25 km (16 mi) south of Schaulen
41♠	15 August 1944	15:23	Il-2 m.H.	PQ 25 Ost 35319; 20 km (12 mi) northwest of Mariiampil	45	1 September 1944	10:56	Il-2	PQ 25 Ost 13552; 15 km (9.3 mi) northeast of Warsaw
42♠	15 August 1944	18:20	La-5	PQ 25 Ost 25433; 25 km (16 mi) east-southeast of Blumenfeld					
– 1. Staffel of Jagdgeschwader 51 – Eastern Front — 10 September – 31 December 1944
46	12 September 1944	09:12	Il-2	PQ 25 Ost N/13729; 15 km (9.3 mi) east of Warsaw	50	18 September 1944	13:43	P-51? (Note: According to Mathews and Foreman claimed as a Boeing B-17 Flying Fortress.)	PQ 25 Ost N/03685; 20 km (12 mi) west of Warsaw
47	12 September 1944	09:16? (Note: According to Mathews and Foreman claimed at 09:18.)	Yak-9	PQ 25 Ost N/13588; 15 km (9.3 mi) east-northeast of Warsaw	51	9 October 1944	14:22	Il-2 m.H.	PQ 25 Ost N/26726 vicinity of Tauroggen
48	15 September 1944	09:55	P-39	PQ 25 Ost N/03861; 15 km (9.3 mi) southwest of Warsaw	52	13 October 1944	14:30	Yak-9	PQ 25 Ost N/25312; 20 km (12 mi) northeast of Insterburg
49	15 September 1944	10:15	P-39	PQ 25 Ost N/13547; 15 km (9.3 mi) north of Warsaw					
– 1. Staffel of Jagdgeschwader 51 – Eastern Front — 1 January – 8 May 1945
According to Mathews and Foreman, Dombacher claimed 17 aerial victories on the Eastern Front in 1945, six of which are documented.
56	16 February 1945	—	Il-2	northwest of Graudenz	59	19 February 1945	—	Il-2	northwest of Neuenburg
57	16 February 1945	—	Il-2	northwest of Graudenz	60	20 February 1945	—	unknown	
58	16 February 1945	—	Il-2	northwest of Graudenz	61	9 March 1945	12:48	Il-2	

=== Awards ===
- Aviator badge
- Front Flying Clasp of the Luftwaffe
- Iron Cross (1939) 2nd and 1st Class
- Honor Goblet of the Luftwaffe on 3 April 1944 as Feldwebel and pilot
- German Cross in Gold on 25 May 1944 as Oberfeldwebel in the I./Jagdgeschwader 51 (Note: According to Obermaier on 20 March 1944.)
- Knight's Cross of the Iron Cross on 8 April 1945 as Leutnant and pilot in 1./Jagdgeschwader 51 "Mölders (Note: Kurt Dombacher's nomination by the troop was processed by the Oberkommando der Luftwaffe/Auszeichnung und Disziplin (OKL/AuD—Air Force High Command/Award and Discipline) on 15 April 1945. This nomination, now recommending approval, was forwarded on 16 April with a Luftwaffenpersonalamt-Verleihungsvorschlag (LPA-VV—Air Force Staff Office Nomination Recommendation) Nr. 1576 to the adjutancy of Hermann Göring. The nomination was never finalized and was left unfinished by the end of the war. A presentation of the Knight's Cross of the Iron Cross cannot be verified. The presentation date of 7 April 1945 as listed by Ernst Obermaier, author of Die Ritterkreuzträger der Luftwaffe Jagdflieger 1939–1945—The Bearers of the Knight's Cross of the Fighter Force 1939–1945, must be incorrect. The presentation date of 8 April 1945 as listed by the Walther-Peer Fellgiebel is an assumption of the Association of Knight's Cross Recipients.)

== Bibliography ==
- Bergström, Christer [in Swedish]. "Bergström Black Cross/Red Star website". Identifying a Luftwaffe Planquadrat. Archived from the original on 22 December 2018.
- Fellgiebel, Walther-Peer [in German] (2000) [1986]. Die Träger des Ritterkreuzes des Eisernen Kreuzes 1939–1945 — Die Inhaber der höchsten Auszeichnung des Zweiten Weltkrieges aller Wehrmachtteile [The Bearers of the Knight's Cross of the Iron Cross 1939–1945 — The Owners of the Highest Award of the Second World War of all Wehrmacht Branches] (in German). Friedberg, Germany: Podzun-Pallas. ISBN 978-3-7909-0284-6.
- Mathews, Andrew Johannes; Foreman, John (2014). Luftwaffe Aces — Biographies and Victory Claims — Volume 1 A–F. Walton on Thames: Red Kite. ISBN 978-1-906592-18-9.
- Obermaier, Ernst (1989). Die Ritterkreuzträger der Luftwaffe Jagdflieger 1939 – 1945 [The Knight's Cross Bearers of the Luftwaffe Fighter Force 1939 – 1945] (in German). Mainz, Germany: Verlag Dieter Hoffmann. ISBN 978-3-87341-065-7.
- Patzwall, Klaus D.; Scherzer, Veit (2001). Das Deutsche Kreuz 1941 – 1945 Geschichte und Inhaber Band II [The German Cross 1941 – 1945 History and Recipients Volume 2] (in German). Norderstedt, Germany: Verlag Klaus D. Patzwall. ISBN 978-3-931533-45-8.
- Patzwall, Klaus D. (2008). Der Ehrenpokal für besondere Leistung im Luftkrieg [The Honor Goblet for Outstanding Achievement in the Air War] (in German). Norderstedt, Germany: Verlag Klaus D. Patzwall. ISBN 978-3-931533-08-3.
- Prien, Jochen; Stemmer, Gerhard; Rodeike, Peter; Bock, Winfried (2004). Die Jagdfliegerverbände der Deutschen Luftwaffe 1934 bis 1945—Teil 7—Heimatverteidigung—1. January bis 31 Dezember 1942—Einsatz im Westen—1. Januar bis 31. Dezember 1942 [The Fighter Units of the German Air Force 1934 to 1945—Part 7—Defense of the Reich—1 January to 31 December 1942—Action in the West—1 January to 31 December 1942] (in German). Eutin, Germany: Struve-Druck. ISBN 978-3-923457-73-1.
- Prien, Jochen; Stemmer, Gerhard; Rodeike, Peter; Bock, Winfried (2012). Die Jagdfliegerverbände der Deutschen Luftwaffe 1934 bis 1945—Teil 12/II—Einsatz im Osten—4.2. bis 31.12.1943 [The Fighter Units of the German Air Force 1934 to 1945—Part 12/II—Action in the East—4 February to 31 December 1943] (in German). Eutin, Germany: Buchverlag Rogge. ISBN 978-3-942943-05-5.
- Prien, Jochen; Stemmer, Gerhard; Balke, Ulf; Bock, Winfried (2022). Die Jagdfliegerverbände der Deutschen Luftwaffe 1934 bis 1945—Teil 15/I—Einsatz im Osten—1.1. bis 31.12.1944 [The Fighter Units of the German Air Force 1934 to 1945—Part 15/I—Action in the East—1 January to 31 December 1944] (in German). Eutin, Germany: Buchverlag Rogge. ISBN 978-3-942943-26-0.
- Scherzer, Veit (2007). Die Ritterkreuzträger 1939–1945 Die Inhaber des Ritterkreuzes des Eisernen Kreuzes 1939 von Heer, Luftwaffe, Kriegsmarine, Waffen-SS, Volkssturm sowie mit Deutschland verbündeter Streitkräfte nach den Unterlagen des Bundesarchives [The Knight's Cross Bearers 1939–1945 The Holders of the Knight's Cross of the Iron Cross 1939 by Army, Air Force, Navy, Waffen-SS, Volkssturm and Allied Forces with Germany According to the Documents of the Federal Archives] (in German). Jena, Germany: Scherzers Militaer-Verlag. ISBN 978-3-938845-17-2.
- Spick, Mike (1996). Luftwaffe Fighter Aces. New York: Ivy Books. ISBN 978-0-8041-1696-1.
- Weal, John (2006). Jagdgeschwader 51 "Mölders". Aviation Elite Units. Vol. 22. Oxford, UK: Osprey Publishing. ISBN 978-1-84603-045-1.
- Zabecki, David T., ed. (2014). Germany at War: 400 Years of Military History. Santa Barbara, California: ABC-Clio. ISBN 978-1-59884-981-3.
- Jahrbuch der Luftfahrt [Yearbook of Aviation]. Jahrbuch der Luft- und Raumfahrt (in German) (8 ed.). Mannheim, Germany: Südwestdeutsche Verlagsanst. 1959. OCLC 258683990.
