= Felix Becker (officer) =

German army officer (1893–1979)

Felix Becker (8 November 1893, Arensdorf, East Prussia – 29 December 1979, Göttingen, Lower Saxony) was a German officer of the Second World War. His final rank was oberst and he commanded Grenadier-Regiment 418, part of 281st Security Division. He was awarded the Iron Cross 2nd Class, Iron Cross 1st Class and on 25 January 1943 the Knight's Cross of the Iron Cross. From March 1945 until the end of the war, he commanded the 561st Volksgrenadier Division.

== Bibliography ==
- Fellgiebel W.P., Elite of the Third Reich, The recipients of the Knight's Cross of the Iron Cross 1939-1945: A Reference, Helion & Company Limited, Solihull, 2003, ISBN 1-874622-46-9
- Mitcham, Samuel W. Jr. (2007). German Order of Battle 291st–999th Infantry Divisions, Named Infantry Divisions, and Special Divisions in WWII. Mechanicsburg, Pennsylvania: Stackpole Books. ISBN 978-0-8117-4844-5.
- (in German) Scherzer, Veit (2007). Ritterkreuzträger 1939 - 1945 Die Inhaber des Ritterkreuzes des Eisernen Kreuzes 1939 von Heer, Luftwaffe, Kriegsmarine, Waffen-SS, Volkssturm sowie mit Deutschland verbündeter Streitkräfte nach den Unterlagen des Bundesarchives. Jena, Germany: Scherzers Militaer-Verlag. ISBN 978-3-938845-17-2
