= 214th Infantry Division (Wehrmacht) =

- 214. Infanterie-Division
- 214. Infanterie Division Vehicle Insignia
- Active: 26 August 1939 – January 1945
- Country: Nazi Germany
- Branch: Army
- Type: Infantry
- Size: Division
- Engagements: Norwegian Campaign; Battle of Narva (1944); Vistula–Oder Offensive

The 214th Infantry Division (German: 214. Infanterie-Division) was a German division in World War II. It was formed on 26 August 1939.

On 1 January 1945, the 214th Infantry Division (then part of 9th Army under Army Group A) had a strength of 10,328 men.

== Orders of Battle ==
=== 214. Infanterie-Division 1939 ===
- Infanterie-Regiment 355
- Infanterie-Regiment 367
- Infanterie-Regiment 388
- Artillerie-Regiment 214
- Pionier-Battalion 214
- Panzerabwehr-Abteilung 214
- Aufklärungs-Abteilung 214
- Infanterie-Divisions-Nachrichten-Abteilung 214
- Infanterie-Divisions-Nachschubführer 214

=== 214. Infanterie-Division 1943 ===
- Grenadier-Regiment 355
- Grenadier-Regiment 367
- Grenadier-Regiment 568
- Divisions-Füsilier-Battalion 214
- Artillerie-Regiment 214
- Pionier-Battalion 214
- Panzerjäger-Abteilung 214
- Infanterie-Divisions-Nachrichten-Abteilung 214
- Infanterie-Divisions-Nachschubführer 214

== Commanding officers ==
- Generalleutnant Theodor Groppe, 1 September 1939 – 30 January 1940
- Generalleutnant Max Horn, 30 January 1940 – 31 December 1943
- Generalmajor Carl Wahle, 31 December 1943 – 15 February 1944
- Generalleutnant Max Horn, 15 February 1944 – 28 March 1944
- Generalleutnant Harry von Kirchbach, 28 March 1944 – January 1945
