= 710th Infantry Division =

- German: 710. Infanterie-Division
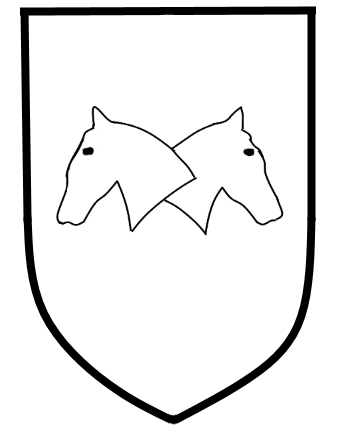
- Vehicle insignia of the 710th Infantry Division
- Active: 2 May 1941 – 8 May 1945
- Disbanded: 8 May 1945
- Country: Nazi Germany
- Branch: Heer (Wehrmacht)
- Type: Infantry
- Size: Division
- Garrison/HQ: Oldenburg
- Engagements: World War II: Italian Front; Operation Spring Awakening; Vienna Offensive

Commanders
- Notable commanders: Walter Gorn

The 710th Infantry Division (German: 710. Infanterie-Division) was a German Army Infantry division in World War II. Formed in May 1941, it spent the majority of the war in occupation duties in Scandinavia before being transferred to the Italian Front in late 1944. It participated in fighting against the Soviet Union in Hungary before it withdrew into Austria and surrendered to the Americans in May 1945.

== History ==
The 710th Infantry Division was formed on 2 May 1941, largely from older personnel, under the command of Generalleutnant (Note: In the Wehrmacht, a generalleutnant was equivalent to the rank of major general in the United States Army.) Theodor Petsch. It was smaller than a conventional infantry division and lacked much of the support weaponry that would typically be found in such a unit. The division served occupation duties in Norway, firstly at Oslo and then at Kristiansand. It later performed similar duties in Denmark until December 1944, at which stage it was transferred to the Italian Front. The following month it was attached to I SS Panzer Corps, which had moved to Hungary after the Battle of the Bulge.

The division, expanded with additional artillery and tank destroyer units, was involved in the fighting against Soviet troops during Operation Spring Awakening and the subsequent withdrawal through Hungary and into Austria. Now under the command of Generalmajor (Note: Equivalent to the rank of brigadier general in the United States Army.) Walter Gorn, it surrendered to a United States Army unit on 8 May 1945.

== Notes ==
Footnotes

Citations
