= Rhineland Offensive =

Series of allied offensive operations by 21st Army Group in 1945

- Part of the Western Allied invasion of Germany
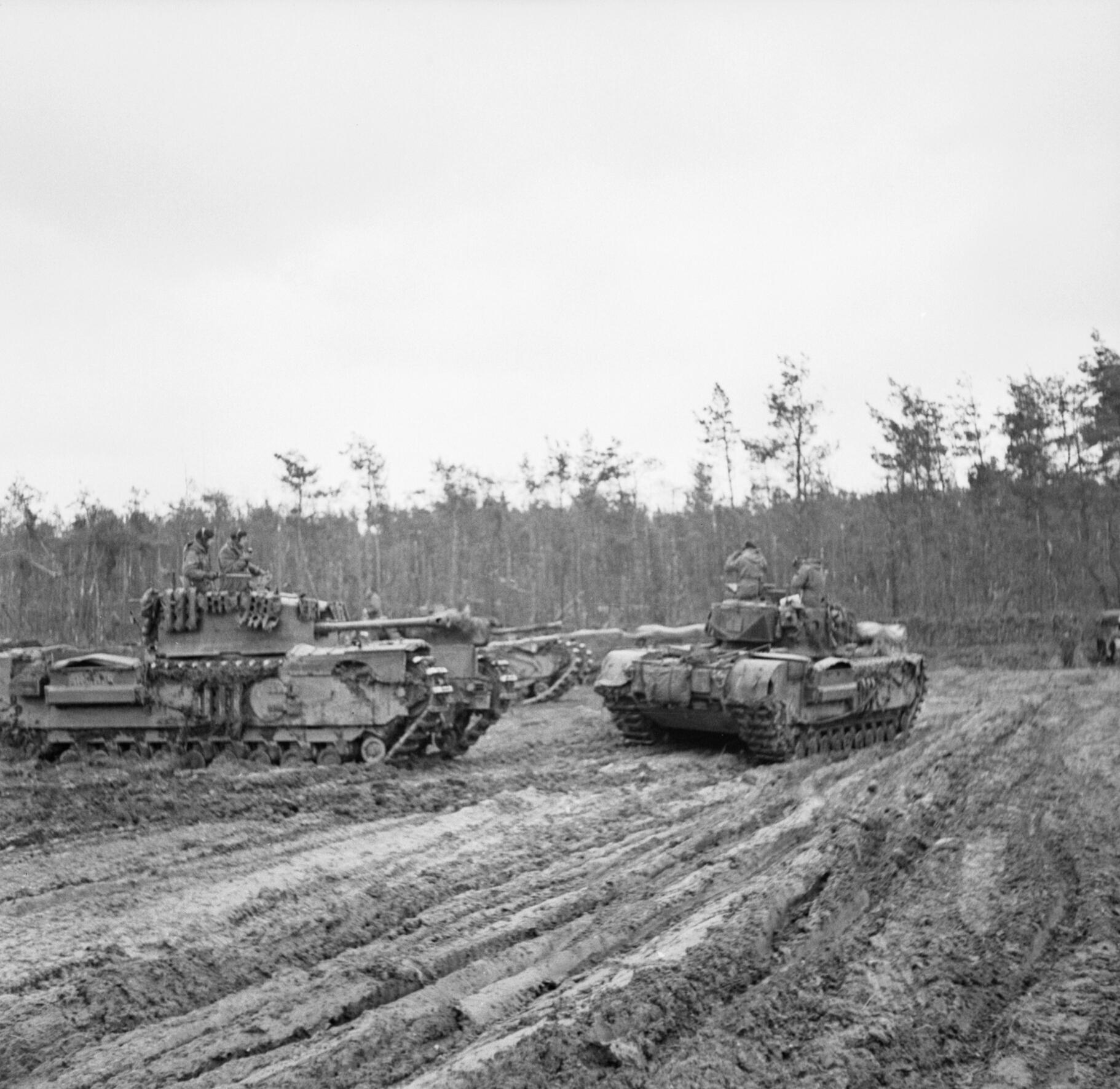
- Churchill tanks at the onset of Operation Veritable, 9 February 1945
Date	8 February – 27 March 1945
Location	Reichswald, (Germany), and adjacent areas
Result	Allied victory

Belligerents
United Kingdom; Canada; United States	Germany

The Rhineland Offensive was a series of allied offensive operations by 21st Army Group commanded by Bernard Montgomery from 8 February 1945 to 25 March 1945, at the end of the Second World War. The operations were aimed at occupying the Rhineland and securing a passage over the Rhine river.

It was part of General Dwight D. Eisenhower's "broad front" strategy to occupy the entire west bank of the Rhine before its crossing. The Rhineland Offensive encompassed Operation Veritable, Operation Grenade, Operation Blockbuster, Operation Plunder and Operation Varsity.

A total of 9,284 American and 17,685 British and Canadian troops became casualties during the fighting.

== Opposing forces ==
=== Allies ===
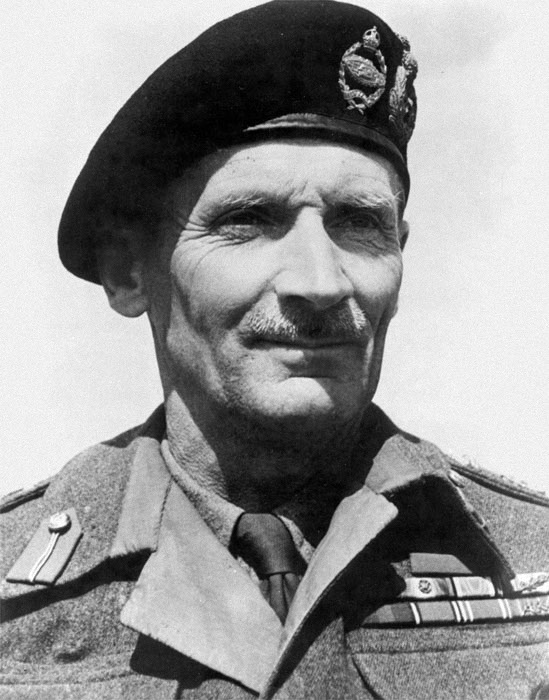
Bernard Montgomery

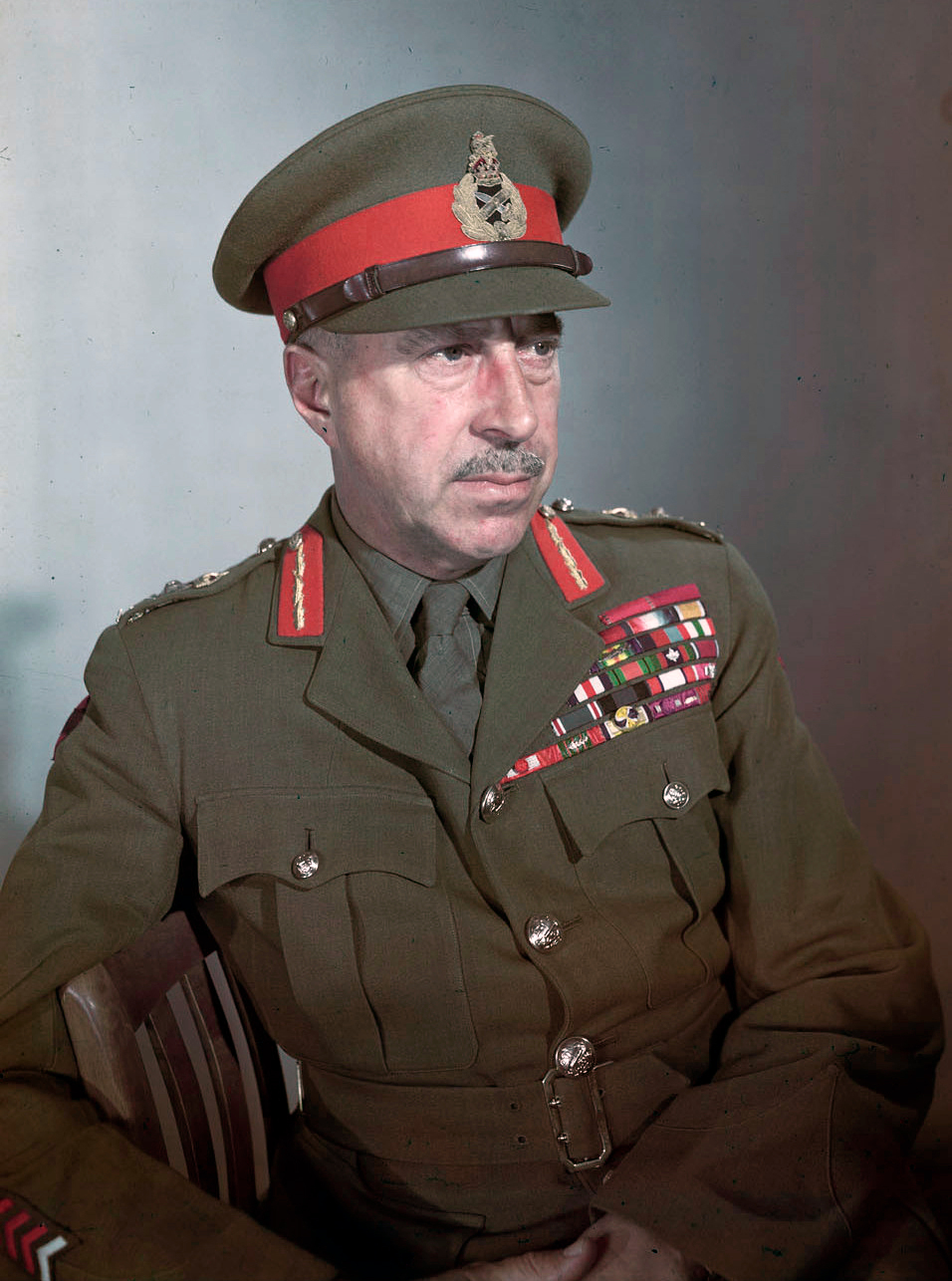
Canada Harry Crerar

Forces deployed North to South:

Allied 21st Army Group
Field Marshal Sir Bernard Law Montgomery

Canadian First Army
Lieutenant General Harry Crerar

British XXX Corps (Lt Gen Brian Horrocks)

British 15th (Scottish) Infantry Division (Maj Gen Colin Barber)
British 43rd (Wessex) Division (Maj Gen Sir Ivor Thomas)
British 51st (Highland) Division (Maj Gen Tom Rennie)
British 53rd (Welsh) Division (Maj Gen Robert Knox Ross)
British Guards Armoured Division (Maj Gen Allan Adair)
Canadian 2nd Infantry Division (Maj Gen Bruce Matthews)
Canadian 3rd Infantry Division (Maj Gen Daniel Spry)

Canadian II Corps (Lt Gen Guy Simonds)

Canadian 4th Armoured Division (Maj Gen Christopher Vokes)

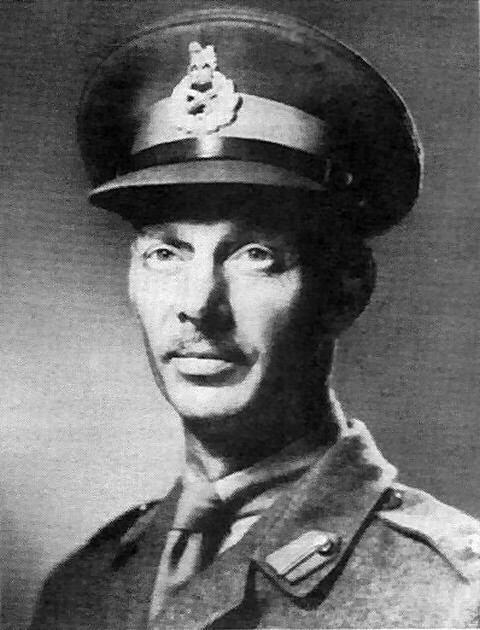
(United Kingdom) Miles Dempsey

British Second Army
Lieutenant General Miles Dempsey

79th Armoured Division (Maj Gen Sir Percy Hobart)

British I Corps (Lt Gen John Crocker)

Polish 1st Armoured Division (Maj Gen Stanisław Maczek)
49th (West Riding) Infantry Division (Maj Gen Gordon MacMillan)

British VIII Corps (Lt Gen Evelyn Barker)

11th Armoured Division (Maj Gen Pip Roberts)
3rd Infantry Division (Maj Gen Lashmer Whistler)

British XII Corps (Lt Gen Neil Ritchie)

7th Armoured Division (Maj Gen Lewis Lyne)
52nd (Lowland) Division (Maj Gen Edmund Hakewill-Smith)

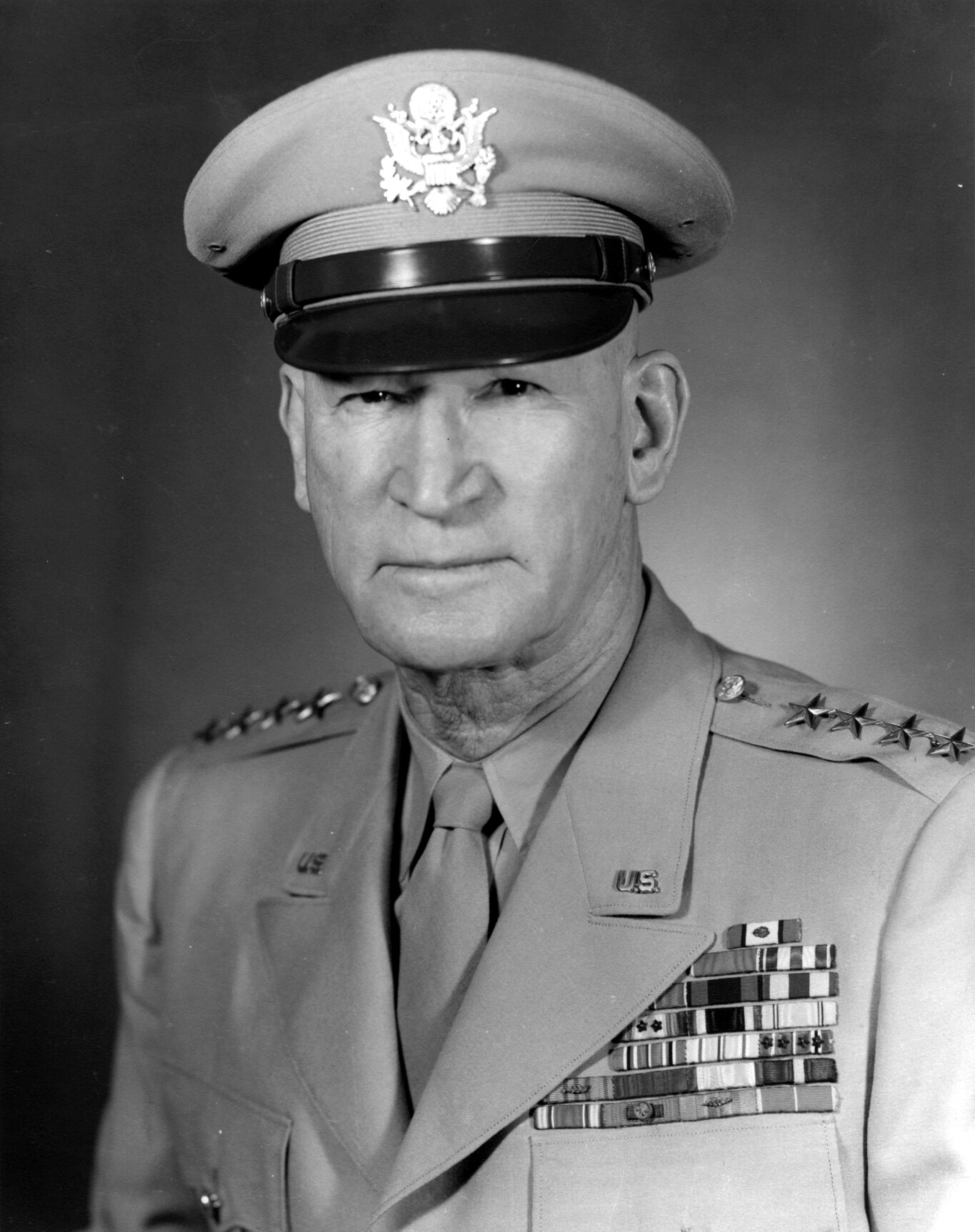
(United States) William H. Simpson

US Ninth Army
Lieutenant General William H. Simpson

75th Infantry Division (Maj. Gen. Ray E. Porter)
95th Infantry Division (Maj. Gen. Harry L. Twaddle)

US XVI Corps (Maj. Gen. John B. Anderson)

8th Armored ("Thundering Herd") Division (Maj. Gen. John M. Devine)
35th Infantry ("Santa Fe") Division (Maj. Gen. Paul W. Baade)
79th Infantry ("Cross of Lorraine") Division (Maj. Gen. Ira T. Wyche)

US XIII Corps (Maj. Gen. Alvan C. Gillem Jr.)

5th Armored ("Victory") Division (Maj. Gen. Lunsford E. Oliver)
84th Infantry ("Railsplitters") Division (Maj. Gen. Alexander R. Bolling)
102nd Infantry ("Ozark") Division (Maj. Gen. Frank A. Keating)

US XIX Corps (Maj. Gen. Raymond S. McLain)

2nd Armored ("Hell on Wheels") Division (Maj. Gen. Isaac D. White)
29th Infantry ("Blue and Gray Division") Division (Maj. Gen. Charles H. Gerhardt)
30th Infantry ("Old Hickory") Division (Maj. Gen. Leland S. Hobbs)
83rd Infantry ("Thunderbolt") Division (Maj. Gen. Robert C. Macon)

=== Axis ===
Theatre commander

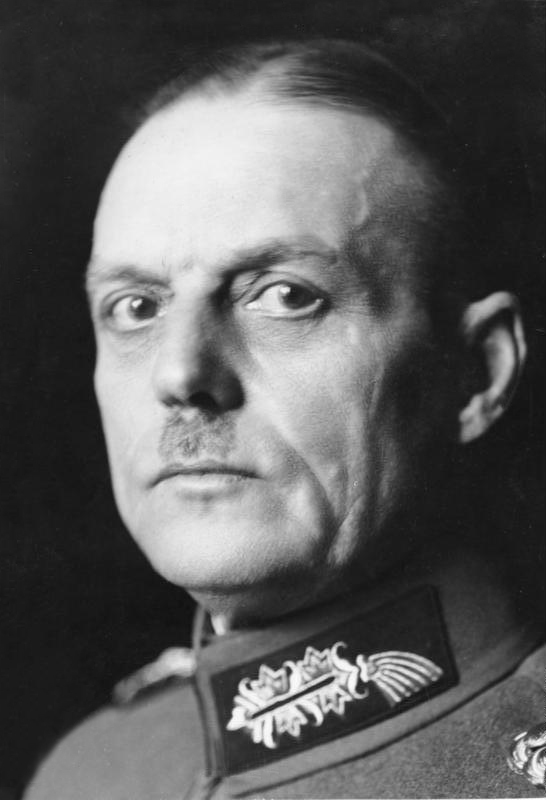
Gerd von Runstedt

Army group commanders

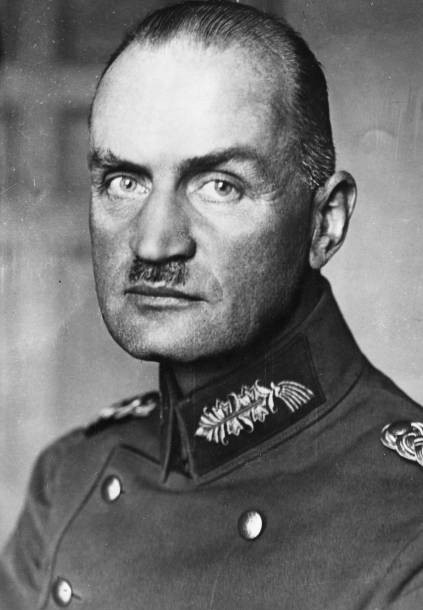
Johannes Blaskowitz

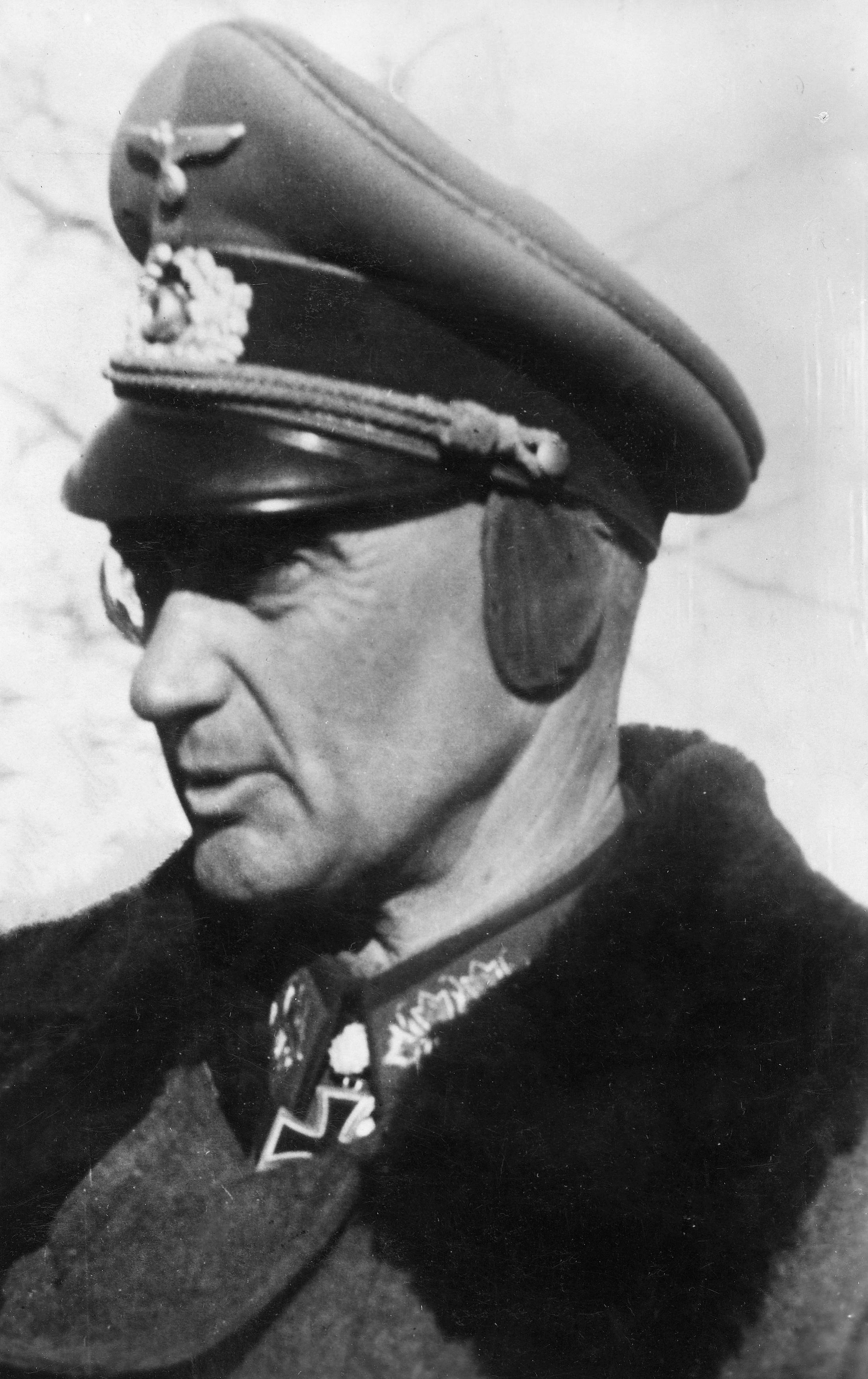
Walter Model

Oberbefehlshaber West
Generalfeldmarschal Gerd von Rundstedt

Forces deployed North to South:

Heeresgruppe H
Generaloberst Johannes Blaskowitz (Note: Charged with war crimes; committed suicide May 1948.)

Twenty-Fifth Army
General der Infanterie Günther Blumentritt

XXX Corps (Otto Fretter-Pico)
LXXXVIII Corps (Hans-Wolfgang Reinhard)

First Parachute Army
General der Fallschirmtruppe Alfred Schlemm

XLVII Panzer Corps (Heinrich Freiherr von Lüttwitz)
II Parachute Corps (Eugen Meindl)
LXXXVI Corps (Erich Straube)

Heeresgruppe B
Generalfeldmarschal Walter Model

Fifteenth Army
General der Infanterie Gustav-Adolf von Zangen

XII SS Corps (Eduard Crasemann)
LXXXI Corps (Friedrich Köchling)
LVIII Panzer Corps (Walter Krüger)

Fifth Panzer Army

General der Panzertruppe Hasso von Manteuffel thru 9 Mar, then Generaloberst Josef Harpe
LXXIV Corps (Carl Püchler)
LXVII Corps (Otto Hitzfeld)
LXVI Corps (Walther Lucht)

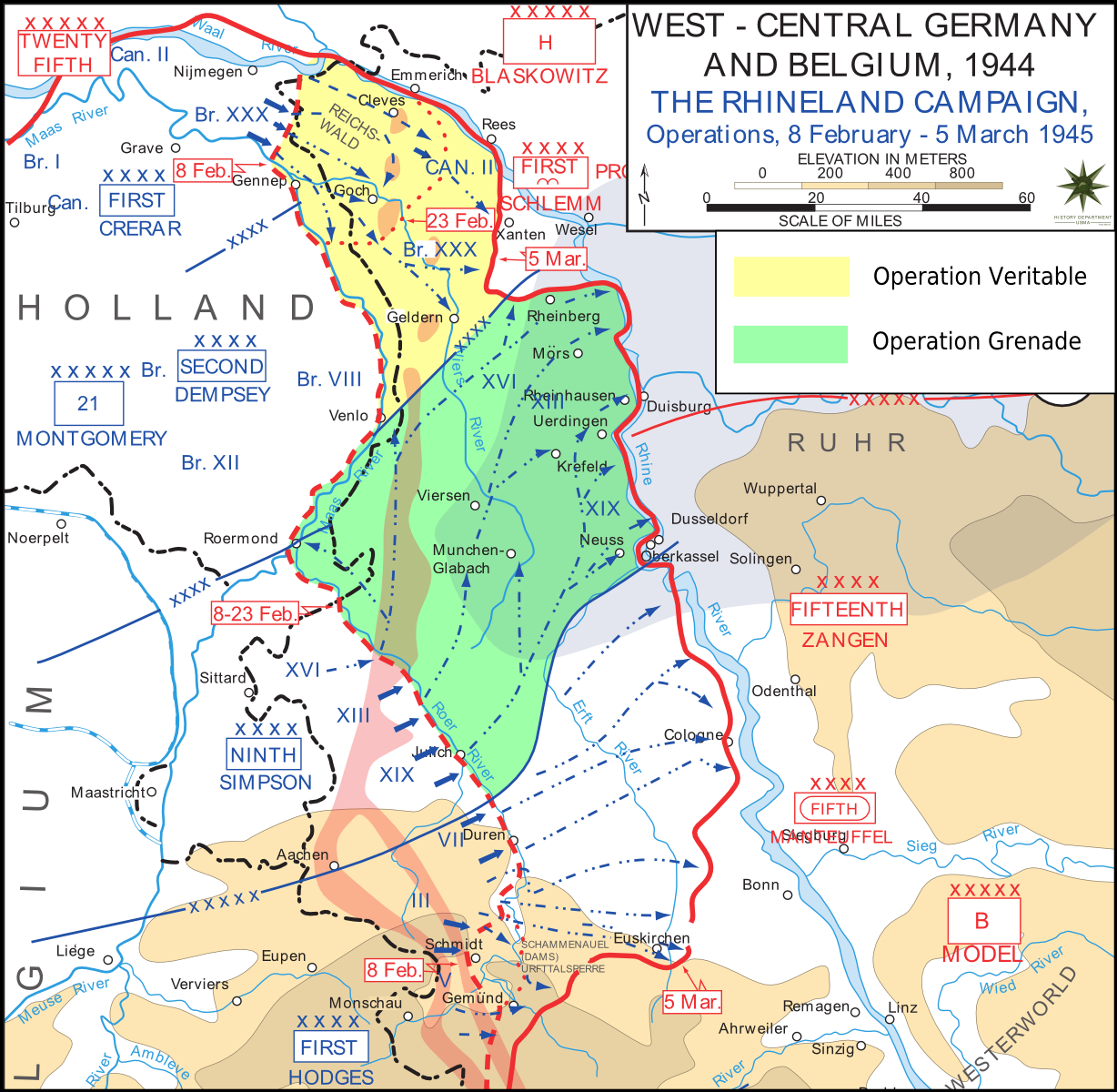
Rhineland campaign (February–March 1945)

== See also ==
- Allied advance from Paris to the Rhine
