= LXXI Army Corps =

The LXXI Army Corps (German: LXXI. Armeekorps), initially known as Higher Command LXXI (German: Höheres Kommando LXXI) or Höh.Kdo. röm. 71, was an army corps of the German Wehrmacht during World War II. The corps was deployed in March 1942. Throughout the war, it was stationed in the north of occupied Norway.

== History ==
The Höheres Kommando LXXI was formed on 1 March 1942 using the personnel of Section Staff North Norway (German: Abschnittsstab Nord-Norwegen), which had in turn been formed on 1 July 1941 from the territorial staff of Mountain Corps Norway. The initial commander of Higher Command LXXI was Emmerich Nagy. The corps initially consisted of the 199th Infantry Division and the 702nd Infantry Division and was subordinate to Armee Norwegen (Nikolaus von Falkenhorst). The corps was strengthened by the 230th Infantry Division and the 270th Infantry Division in May 1942, and the 702nd Infantry Division was pulled away by June.

The subsequent corps structure, including the 199th, 230th and 270th Divisions, stayed unchanged between June 1942 and November 1944.

Nagy was succeeded by Willi Moser on 1 November 1942.

On 26 January 1943, the Higher Command LXXI was renamed LXXI Army Corps, with Moser still in command.

In November 1944, the Armee Norwegen was dissolved and its tasks taken over by the 20th Mountain Army (Lothar Rendulic, Franz Böhme). The 230th Infantry Division was pulled away from the corps in November. Moser was succeeded as corps commander by Anton Reichard von Mauchenheim genannt Bechtolsheim on 15 December 1944. In December 1944, the 163rd Infantry Division and 210th Infantry Division were added to the corps, while the 270th Division was pulled away.

Starting in February 1945, the LXXI Army Corps was part of Army Detachment Narvik (Ferdinand Jodl), where it remained until the end of the war. By February, the 163rd and 210th Divisions had been pulled away from the corps and the 7th Mountain Division had been added. The Division zbV 140 was added to the corps by 1 March.

On 12 April 1945, the last day for which military organizational charts are available, the corps consisted of the 140th, 210th and the 230th Divisions.

== Structure ==
Year	Date	Commander	Subordinate units	Army	Army Group	Operational area
1942	10 March	Emmerich Nagy	199th Infantry, 702nd Infantry	Armee Norwegen	Directly under OKW	Northern Norway
1942	5 April	Emmerich Nagy	199th Infantry, 702nd Infantry	Armee Norwegen	Directly under OKW	Northern Norway
1942	11 May	Emmerich Nagy	199th Infantry, 230th Infantry, 270th Infantry, 702nd Infantry	Armee Norwegen	Directly under OKW	Northern Norway
1942	8 June	Emmerich Nagy	199th Infantry, 230th Infantry, 270th Infantry	Armee Norwegen	Directly under OKW	Northern Norway
1942	4 July	Emmerich Nagy	199th Infantry, 230th Infantry, 270th Infantry	Armee Norwegen	Directly under OKW	Northern Norway
1942	5 August	Emmerich Nagy	199th Infantry, 230th Infantry, 270th Infantry	Armee Norwegen	Directly under OKW	Northern Norway
1942	2 September	Emmerich Nagy	199th Infantry, 230th Infantry, 270th Infantry	Armee Norwegen	Directly under OKW	Northern Norway
1942	8 October	Emmerich Nagy	199th Infantry, 230th Infantry, 270th Infantry	Armee Norwegen	Directly under OKW	Northern Norway
1942	5 November	Willi Moser	199th Infantry, 230th Infantry, 270th Infantry	Armee Norwegen	Directly under OKW	Northern Norway
1942	1 December	Willi Moser	199th Infantry, 230th Infantry, 270th Infantry	Armee Norwegen	Directly under OKW	Northern Norway
1943	1 January	Willi Moser	199th Infantry, 230th Infantry, 270th Infantry	Armee Norwegen	Directly under OKW	Northern Norway
1943	3 February	Willi Moser	199th Infantry, 230th Infantry, 270th Infantry	Armee Norwegen	Directly under OKW	Northern Norway
1943	4 March	Willi Moser	199th Infantry, 230th Infantry, 270th Infantry	Armee Norwegen	Directly under OKW	Northern Norway
1943	9 April	Willi Moser	199th Infantry, 230th Infantry, 270th Infantry	Armee Norwegen	Directly under OKW	Northern Norway
1943	1 May	Willi Moser	199th Infantry, 230th Infantry, 270th Infantry	Armee Norwegen	Directly under OKW	Northern Norway
1943	1 June	Willi Moser	199th Infantry, 230th Infantry, 270th Infantry	Armee Norwegen	Directly under OKW	Northern Norway
1943	7 July	Willi Moser	199th Infantry, 230th Infantry, 270th Infantry	Armee Norwegen	Directly under OKW	Northern Norway
1943	5 August	Willi Moser	199th Infantry, 230th Infantry, 270th Infantry	Armee Norwegen	Directly under OKW	Northern Norway
1943	5 September	Willi Moser	199th Infantry, 230th Infantry, 270th Infantry	Armee Norwegen	Directly under OKW	Northern Norway
1943	4 October	Willi Moser	199th Infantry, 230th Infantry, 270th Infantry	Armee Norwegen	Directly under OKW	Northern Norway
1943	8 November	Willi Moser	199th Infantry, 230th Infantry, 270th Infantry	Armee Norwegen	Directly under OKW	Northern Norway
1943	3 December	Willi Moser	199th Infantry, 230th Infantry, 270th Infantry	Armee Norwegen	Directly under OKW	Northern Norway
1944	January	Willi Moser	199th Infantry, 230th Infantry, 270th Infantry	Armee Norwegen	Directly under OKW	Northern Norway
1944	February	Willi Moser	199th Infantry, 230th Infantry, 270th Infantry	Armee Norwegen	Directly under OKW	Northern Norway
1944	March	Willi Moser	199th Infantry, 230th Infantry, 270th Infantry	Armee Norwegen	Directly under OKW	Northern Norway
1944	April	Willi Moser	199th Infantry, 230th Infantry, 270th Infantry	Armee Norwegen	Directly under OKW	Northern Norway
1944	May	Willi Moser	199th Infantry, 230th Infantry, 270th Infantry	Armee Norwegen	Directly under OKW	Northern Norway
1944	11 June	Willi Moser	199th Infantry, 230th Infantry, 270th Infantry	Armee Norwegen	Directly under OKW	Northern Norway
1944	22 July	Willi Moser	199th Infantry, 230th Infantry, 270th Infantry	Armee Norwegen	Directly under OKW	Northern Norway
1944	31 August	Willi Moser	199th Infantry, 230th Infantry, 270th Infantry	Armee Norwegen	Directly under OKW	Northern Norway
1944	16 September	Willi Moser	199th Infantry, 230th Infantry, 270th Infantry	Armee Norwegen	Directly under OKW	Northern Norway
1944	13 October	Willi Moser	199th Infantry, 230th Infantry, 270th Infantry	Armee Norwegen	Directly under OKW	Northern Norway
1944	5 November	Willi Moser	199th Infantry, 230th Infantry, 270th Infantry	20th Mountain Army	Directly under OKW	Northern Norway
1944	26 November	Willi Moser	199th Infantry, 270th Infantry, Lofoten	20th Mountain Army	Directly under OKW	Northern Norway
1944	31 December	A. R. von Mauchenheim	163rd Infantry, 199th Infantry (+ 503rd Grenadier Brigade), 210th Infantry (+ Lofoten)	20th Mountain Army	Directly under OKW	Northern Norway
1945	19 February	A. R. von Mauchenheim	7th Mountain, 199th Infantry (+ 503rd Grenadier Brigade)	20th Mountain Army	Directly under OKW	Northern Norway
1945	1 March	A. R. von Mauchenheim	7th Mountain, 140th Infantry (+ 139th Mountaineer Brigade, + 503rd Grenadier Brigade), 210th Infantry (+ Lofoten)	Army Detachment Narvik (Note: Often, Wehrmacht army detachments served directly under army groups, but Army Detachment Narvik stayed under 20th Mountain Army.) (20th Mountain Army)	Directly under OKW	Northern Norway
1945	12 April	A. R. von Mauchenheim	139th Mountaineer Brigade, 140th Infantry, 210th Infantry (+ Lofoten), 230th Infantry, 503rd Grenadier Brigade	Army Detachment Narvik (20th Mountain Army)	Directly under OKW	Northern Norway

== Noteworthy individuals ==
- Emmerich Nagy, corps commander of Higher Command LXXI (15 March 1942 – 1 November 1942).
- Willi Moser, corps commander of Higher Command LXXI and LXXI Army Corps (1 November 1942 – 15 December 1944).
- Anton Reichard von Mauchenheim, corps commander of LXXI Army Corps (15 December 1944 – May 1945).
