= Battle of the Mons pocket =

World War II battle in Belgium (1944)

- Part of the Western Front of World War II
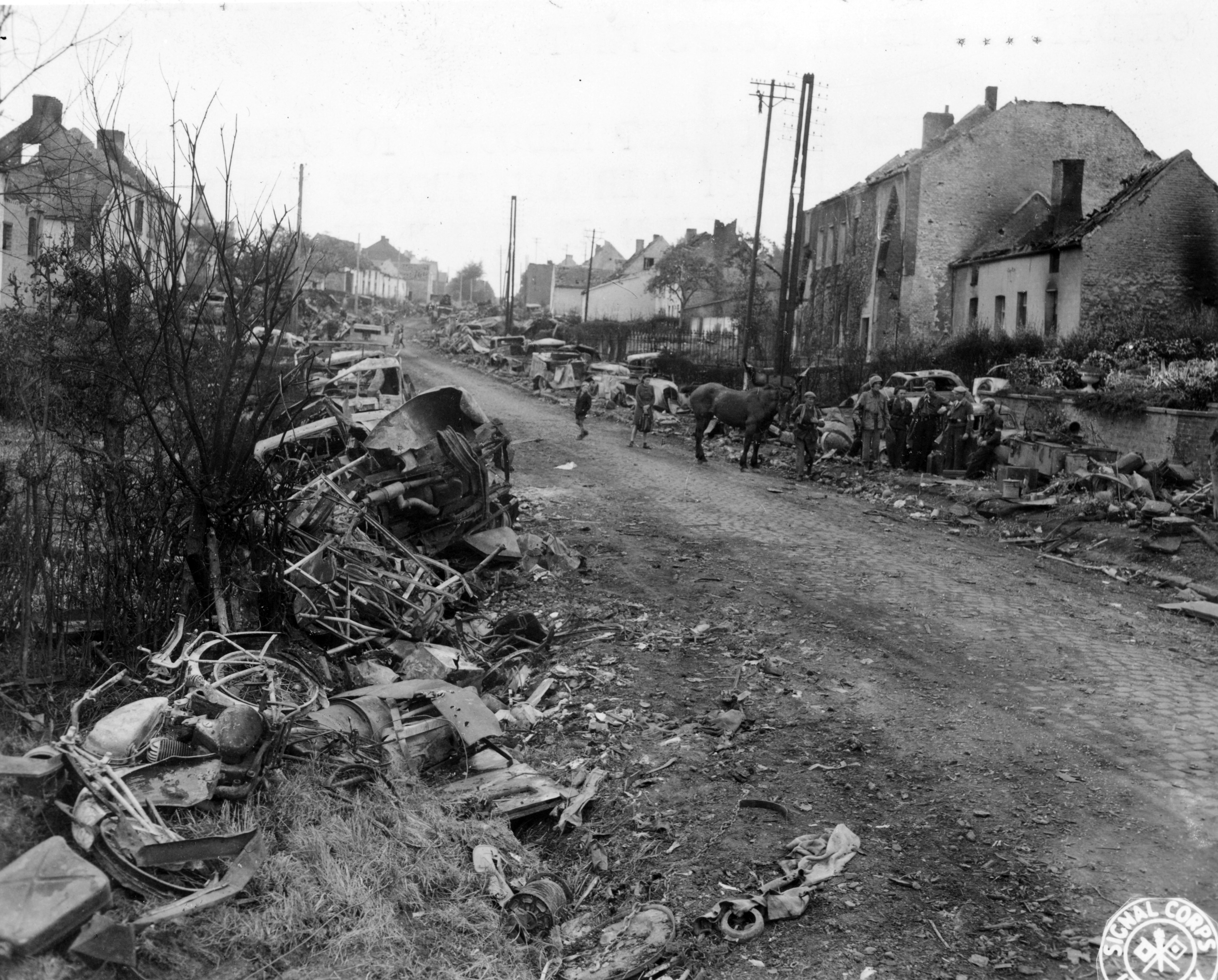
- Destroyed German motorized equipment that was bulldozed aside to make way, Gagnies-Chausser, Belgium, 5 September, 1944
Date	31 August – 5 September 1944
Location	Vicinity of Mons, Belgium
Result	Allied victory

Belligerents
United States; Belgium	Germany

Commanders and leaders
Courtney Hodges; J. Lawton Collins	Erich Straube

Units involved
First United States Army; Belgian resistance	Army Task Group Straube

Strength
	~70,000

Casualties and losses
~89 killed	3,500 killed 25,000 captured

The battle of the Mons pocket was an engagement fought between Allied and German forces during late August and early September 1944. It formed part of the final stages of the rapid Allied advance across France and Belgium. During the battle United States Army forces, assisted by the Belgian Resistance, encircled a large number of retreating German Army and Waffen-SS troops near the town of Mons in Belgium. The German forces were disorganised and unable to counter the Allied forces. Around 3,500 Germans were killed and 25,000 made prisoners of war. Allied casualties were light.

== Background ==
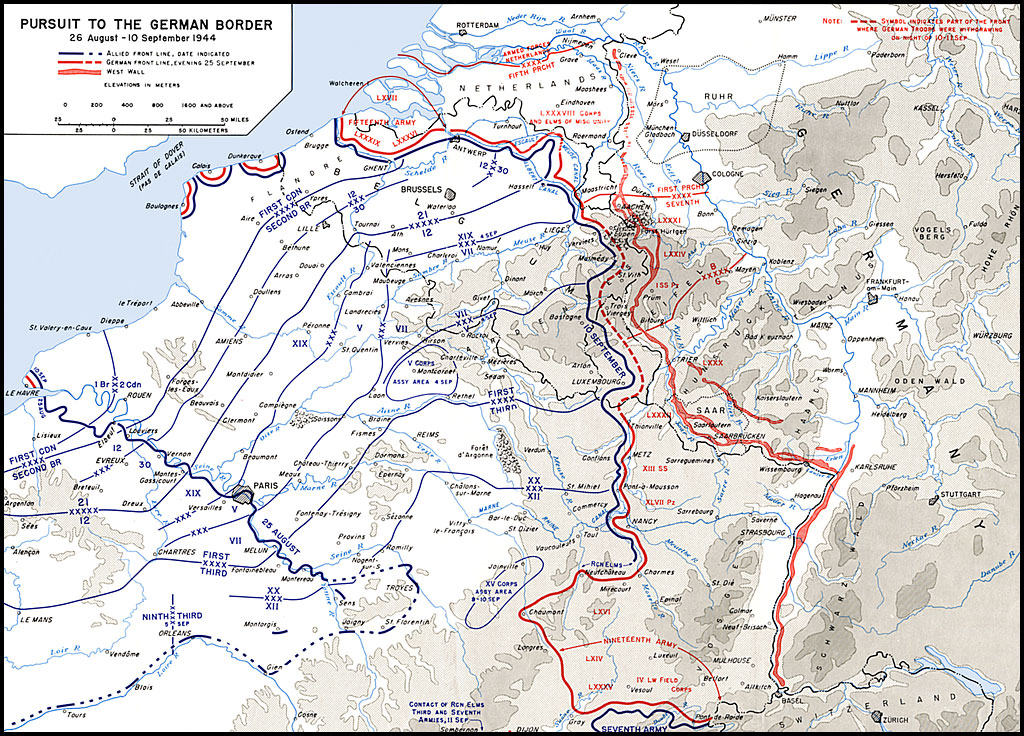
The Allied advance through France and Belgium between 26 August and 10 September 1944

In late July and August 1944, Allied forces broke out of the Normandy beachhead and rapidly advanced across France, liberating the country from German occupation. The overriding goal of the Allied forces at this time was to advance quickly enough to reach the Rhine river before the Germans could man and reactivate the Siegfried Line defences which ran along the border between France and Germany. On 27 August General Omar Bradley, the commander of the Twelfth Army Group which was the main US Army force in northern France, ordered the armies under his command to "go as far as practicable" until they out-ran their supply lines. The US Army was well-suited to this type of warfare, as its units were highly motorized and trained to conduct large scale mobile operations.

The German forces in France had suffered heavy losses during the fighting in Normandy, and attempted to fall back ahead of the Allied forces. Their ability to do so was limited by the rapid Allied advance, road congestion, destroyed bridges and Allied air attacks. The Germany Army's infantry units were much less mobile than their Allied equivalents, as they lacked motor transport. At the start of the Allied breakout the German dictator Adolf Hitler directed that defensive positions be prepared along the Somme and Marne rivers in northern France. These positions were to be used to fight a delaying action. However, by the time the German forces reached the defensive positions along the Somme and Marne they were in no condition to offer serious resistance; a US Army history of the campaign described the German units at this time as "exhausted, disorganized, and demoralized ". By late August the German forces in northern France and Belgium were retreating in disarray. OB West was attempting to re-establish a coherent line along the Schelde river's estuary, the Albert Canal and the Meuse River.

== Prelude ==
=== Allied advance ===
In late August Bradley decided that the First Army should temporarily prioritise cutting off the retreat of German units in northern France and Belgium over reaching the Rhine. The Army's commander, Lieutenant general Courtney Hodges, was directed on 31 August to advance to the north to cut the highway between Lille and Brussels. Hodges' main objective was the town of Tournai in Belgium, which he was ordered to liberate by midnight on 2 September. This task was assigned to XIX Corps which was responsible for the northernmost element of the First Army's area of operations. XIX Corps reached the town at 10 pm on 2 September. During the advance it captured 1,300 Germans. V Corps, which was in the center of the First Army's line, simultaneously advanced toward Landrecies and took it on 2 September; few German units were encountered.

=== German retreat ===
The 5th Panzer Army was the main unit facing the Allies in northern France during late August, and was responsible initially for forces in the region from the channel coast to Paris. It was unable to slow the Allied offensive, and command and control soon broke down. The Army's headquarters at Amiens was overrun by British troops on 31 August, though its commander SS-Oberst-Gruppenführer Sepp Dietrich and his staff escaped.

In late August large numbers of German military personnel were moving through the area to the south west of Mons. They were mainly members of LVIII Panzer Corps, LXXIV Army Corps and II SS Panzer Corps. These corps included the badly battered remnants of ten combat divisions, as well as smaller units and many support personnel. All three corps headquarters were out of contact with superior commands.

On 31 August the three German corps commanders decided to group their forces as a provisional army led by the commander of LXXIV Army Corps, General der Infanterie Erich Straube. This command was designated Army Task Group Straube. Straube had no sources of information on the broader conditions in the area, but was able to determine from intercepted Allied radio broadcasts and other sources of information that his command was in imminent danger of being encircled. In response, he decided to withdraw his forces to an area near Mons where canals and marshy conditions would aid defensive efforts. The next day the German commanders decided to attempt a breakout to the northeast, with the goal of reaching the Nivelles area in Belgium. This would require moving their forces almost 70 kilometres (43 mi) through the Mons area in the face of the rapid Allied advance.

== Battle ==
The VII Corps was responsible for the eastern sector of the First Army's area of operations. It was commanded by Major General J. Lawton Collins, and included the 3rd Armoured Division, 1st Infantry Division and 9th Infantry Division.

Collins was ordered on 31 August to cease his corps drive to the north-east, and turn north towards Avesnes-sur-Helpe, Maubeuge and Mons. The 3rd Armored Division led this advance, with the 1st Infantry Division on the corps' left and the 9th Infantry Division on the right of the line. The 4th Cavalry Group was assigned responsibility for maintaining contact with the Third Army to the south. The corps initially encountered only German outposts. The 3rd Armored Division advanced rapidly, and communications problems meant that Collins did not receive orders from Hodges on 2 September to stop short of Mons to conserve fuel supplies. At this time, Collins did not appreciate the size of the German force approaching Mons. The 3rd Armored Division liberated Mons on the morning of 3 September. At this time the 1st Infantry Division was at Avesnes and the 9th Infantry Division at Charleroi.

The VII Corps' advance, and that of First Army's other two corps, trapped the German forces under Straube. The 3rd Armored Division set up roadblocks on the road between Mons and Avesnes, and the 1st Infantry Division attacked to the north-west from Avesnes into the German forces. XIX Corps was to the west of the pocket, V Corps to its south and British forces were advancing rapidly to block the Germans' escape to the north. The German forces were badly disorganised, and lacked fuel and ammunition. Around 70,000 Germans were trapped in the pocket.

There was some fighting between American and German forces on the night of 2/3 September. As part of this combat, a tank unit of the 3rd Armoured division destroyed a mile-long column of German vehicles. American air units also attacked German forces in the Mons pocket, and inflicted heavy casualties. Many motorised German units managed to escape from the pocket though by fighting their way through American forces. During 3 September large numbers of German troops surrendered to the Americans, with the 1st Infantry and 3rd Armored Divisions taking between 7,500 and 9,000 prisoners.

The 3rd Armored Division disengaged from the Mons pocket during 4 September in order to resume VII Corps' advance to the east. The 1st Infantry Division continued to eliminate German positions with the assistance of Belgian Resistance fighters, and took large numbers of prisoners. This continued the next day, with the 26th Infantry Regiment taking a group of 3,000 Germans prisoner near Wasmes. The battle concluded during the evening of 5 September.

Overall, around 25,000 Germans were captured in the Mons area. German casualties included approximately 3,500 killed. The remainder of the German troops, including the staffs of the three corps headquarters, escaped before the encirclement was complete. The German units also lost large quantities of equipment, including 40 armored fighting vehicles, 100 half-tracks, 120 artillery guns, 100 antitank and antiaircraft guns and almost 2000 vehicles.

The VII Corps suffered few casualties. The 3rd Armored Division lost 57 men killed, and the 1st Infantry Division had 32 killed and 93 wounded. Losses of equipment were also light, and included two tanks, a tank destroyer and 20 other vehicles.

== Aftermath ==
On 3 September the German High Commander in the West, Generalfeldmarschall Walter Model, decided it was impossible to hold positions in northern France and Belgium, and that his forces should withdraw to the Siegfried Line. By this time many German units were not putting up a fight when they encountered Allied forces.

The number of Germans taken prisoner in the Mons pocket was the second highest of any engagement during the 1944 campaign in the west, exceeded only by the capture of some 45,000 in the Falaise pocket during August. Had the Americans advanced more quickly or their commanders understood the size of the German forces and prioritised the engagement, many more could have been taken prisoner.

The victory at Mons opened a 75-kilometer (47 mi)-wide gap in the German front line. This cleared the path for the First Army's advance to the Siegfried Line, and aided the liberation of Belgium by British forces. On 6 September Hodges told his staff the war would be over within 10 days if the weather held. This proved too optimistic: logistical problems, difficult terrain, and the recovery of the German Army as it neared the national border slowed the Allied advance. Despite the losses at the Mons pocket, most of the German forces in Northern France and Belgium managed to reach Germany. By 10 September the German high command had managed to re-establish a continuous front line from the North Sea to Switzerland. The Allies were unable to cross the Rhine until March 1945.

The Mons pocket received little press coverage at the time of the battle. Few historians have since covered it. In 1961 the US Army official historian Martin Blumenson wrote that "the head-on encounter at Mons was, from the tactical point of view, a surprise for both sides. Neither Americans nor Germans had been aware of the approach of the other, and both had stumbled into an unforeseen meeting that resulted in a short, impromptu battle." In 1999 Peter Mansoor gave the battle as an example of the US Army's ability to "move fast and strike hard". He argued that the engagement, along with the breakout from Normandy which had followed Operation Cobra and the invasion of southern France in August 1944, demonstrated that the US Army was able to conduct maneuver warfare in 1944, despite some commentators arguing that it had failed to do so. Robert M. Citino noted in 2017 that the battle of the Mons pocket had formed part of "one of the greatest operational victories of all time", and Hodges "had capped his operational sequence with an impressive little kesselschlacht".

== See also ==
- Surrender of General Botho Elster
