= Anton Reichard von Mauchenheim =

German army officer (1896–1961)

Anton Reichard von Mauchenheim genannt Bechtolsheim
- Born: 9 July 1896
- Died: 9 February 1961 (aged 64)
- Occupation: Wehrmacht officer
- Relatives: Theodor von Bechtolsheim (brother)
- Military career
- Allegiance: Nazi Germany
- Branch: German Army
- Rank: General der Artillerie
- Commands: 6th Army; XXIII Army Corps; XXIX Army Corps; 257th Infantry Division; LXXI Army Corps
- Conflicts: World War II
- Awards: The German Cross in gold (1942); The Prussian Iron Cross, First and Second Class, from World War I

Anton Reichard von Mauchenheim genannt Bechtolsheim (9 July 1896 – 9 February 1961) was a German army officer.

He was born in Würzburg, and was a brother of Theodor von Bechtolsheim. From 1937 he served as military attaché in London. In 1939 he joined the General Staff of the 6th Army, as operations officer. From 1941 he was chief of the General Staff of the XXIII Army Corps, and subsequently the XXIX Army Corps. From 1943 to 1944 he commanded the 257th Infantry Division at the Eastern Front. In December 1944 he joined the LXXI Army Corps in Norway, and was commanding general of the corps from March 1945, with the rank of General der Artillerie. From 9 May 1945 he was detached as liaison officer for the surrendered German Armed Forces in the turnover negotiations with the Allied Forces.

== Awards ==
His decorations included the German Cross in gold from 1942, and the Prussian Iron Cross, First and Second Class, from World War I.

Military offices
Preceded by Generalleutnant Carl Püchler	Commander of 257. Infanterie-Division; 5 November 1943 - 2 July 1944	Succeeded by Generalmajor Friedrich Blümke
Preceded by General der Panzertruppe Erich Brandenberger	Commander of XXIX. Armeekorps; 2 July - 1 September 1944	Succeeded by Infantry General Kurt Röpke
Preceded by Generalleutnant Willi Moser	Commander of LXXI. Armeekorps; 15 December 1944 - 8 May 1945	Succeeded by none
