= 230th Division =

230th Division may refer to:

- 230th Infantry (Coastal Defense) Division, Germany
- 230th Coastal Division, Italy
- 230th Division (Imperial Japanese Army)
- 230th Rifle Division, Soviet Union

== See also ==
- List of military divisions by number
