= 270th Division =

270th Division may refer to:

- 270th Infantry Division (Wehrmacht), Germany
- 270th Motor Rifle Division, Soviet Union
- 270th Rifle Division, Soviet Union

== See also ==
- List of military divisions by number
