= Helwig Luz =

- Born: 28 June 1892; Buttenheim, Bavaria
- Died: 28 April 1980 (aged 87); Krün, Bavaria
- Military career
- Allegiance: German Empire (to 1918); Weimar Republic (to 1933); Nazi Germany
- Branch: Army (Wehrmacht)
- Service years: 1912–1945
- Rank: Generalleutnant
- Commands: 199th Infantry Division
- Conflicts: World War I World War II: Battle of France; Operation Barbarossa; Battle of Uman; Battle of Kiev (1941); Battle of Moscow
- Awards: Knight's Cross of the Iron Cross

Helwig Fedor Johannes Luz (June 28, 1892 – April 28, 1980) was a highly decorated Generalleutnant in the Wehrmacht during World War II. He was a recipient of the Knight's Cross of the Iron Cross awarded for his service as Commander of Schützen-Regiment 110 during the Operation Barbarossa.

== Life and career ==
Helwig Luz was born on June 28, 1892, in Buttenheim in the Upper Franconia, Bavaria. Following his Abitur, he entered the Bavarian Army as Fahnenjunker (Cadet) in July 1912 and was assigned to the Bavarian 8th Chevau-léger-Regiment in Dillingen an der Donau. He was promoted to Fähnrich (Officer candidate) shortly thereafter.

=== World War I ===
At the time of the outbreak of World War I, Luz still served with his regiment and was promoted to Leutnant (second lieutenant) in August 1914. He served consecutively as Platoon leader, Escadron commander and Regimental Adjutant and took part in combats on the Western Front. He distinguished himself during the combats in France and received both classes of Prussian Iron Cross for bravery. By the end of 1916, Luz was transferred to the 1st Infantry Regiment „König“ and served as Battalion Adjutant for several months, before joined the newly established 13th Jäger Regiment as regimental adjutant in September 1917.

Luz then saw service on the Italian Front, taking part in the battles of Isonzo River, Julian Alps and Piave river, before his regiment was transferred to the Western Front in January 1918. Luz then took part in the German Spring Offensive and defensive combats along Somme, Marne, Oise and Aisne rivers and received Bavarian Military Merit Order, 4th Class with Swords and Crown, Austrian Military Merit Cross, and Knight's cross of House Order of Hohenzollern with Swords.

=== Interwar period ===
Following the War, his unit was incorporated to the Freikorps Epp, a paramilitary unit of former soldiers under the command of Colonel Franz Ritter von Epp, and Luz took part in the suppressing of Bavarian Soviet Republic in April and May 1919. He then joined the newly established Reichswehr's Reiter Regiment 17 in Bamberg, Bavaria and served as Escadron Commander, being promoted to Rittmeister (Captain) in September 1924. He replaced another future general, Karl von Thüngen as regimental adjutant to Colonel Rudolf Koch-Erpach in May 1932 and served in this capacity until the end of year.

He was subsequently promoted to Major and appointed Personnel officer of 3rd Cavalry Division under future Generalfeldmarchall, Maximilian von Weichs in Weimar, Thuringia. Upon promotion to Oberstleutnant (lieutenant colonel) in August 1938, Luz was transferred to Berlin and assumed duty as Department Chief in the OKH, the high command of German Army land forces. While in this capacity, he was promoted to Oberst (Colonel) in April 1939.

=== World War II ===
At the time of German Invasion of Poland in September 1939, Luz still served at the OKH. However two months later, he was appointed commander of newly established 110th Rifle Regiment (Schützen-Regiment 110), the part of 11th Rifle Brigade. He led his regiment during the initial training and brigade formation at the troop training grounds at Altengrabow, Thuringia; and Lüneburg Heath, before departed for combat duty to Denmark in April 1940. Luz and his regiment then took part in the Invasion of France from May to July that year, and he was decorated with clasps to his Iron Cross for his service in that campaign.

The 11th Rifle Brigade was meanwhile incorporated into the newly established 11th Panzer Division and participated in the Invasion of Yugoslavia in April 1941. Luz and his division was then ordered to the Eastern Front and participated in the Operation Barbarossa, the German invasion to the Soviet Union by the end of June 1941. During the first weeks of combats, Luz was lightly wounded and received Wound Badge in Black.

Following his recovery, Luz led his regiment during the Battles of Uman and Kiev; and then took part in the German advance on Moscow. His regiment also fought at Vyazma and Luz was decorated with the Knight's Cross of the Iron Cross, the highest decoration of Nazi Germany awarded for bravery in combat. He was succeeded by Oberst Ludwig Fricke by the end of November and assumed command of Schützen Brigade 11 (later transformed to 11th Panzergrenadier Brigade).

During the early months of 1942, Luz led his brigade during the combats at Gzhatsk near Smolensk and Voronezh, before took part in the fighting on Don river. He was promoted to Generalmajor in April 1942. Luz was decorated by Bulgaria and Croatia for his service and received Panzer Badge in Bronze.

In mid September 1942, his older son Helwig was killed in action in Stalingrad, while served as Leutnant with Panzer Regiment 24 and General Luz was ordered back to Germany. He spent several next months in Führer Reserve, before assumed duty as Commander, Settlement office for the 6th Army (Abwicklungsstelle 6. Armee) in February 1943.

Following the distaster in Stalingrad, almost 300,000 German soldiers was killed, captured, wounded or missing. Kins of these soldiers needed information about them or even death certificates. In order to fulfill these requests, the OKW established this office in Rudolstadt, Thuringia and the fates of Stalingrad soldiers were reconstructed from the interviews of surviving soldiers, documentation and other. Later when other units were destroyed in combats in Africa, Luz's office provided information regarding these casualties.

Luz was promoted to Generalleutnant in April 1944 and remained in that assignment until the early June that year, when he was transferred to Norway as new commander of 199. Infanterie-Division. His new unit with headquarters in Narvik was mostly used for the defense of the Norwegian coast against possible invasion, but as the war progressed, his division was transferred to Denmark in April 1945.

Luz tried to retreat with his division to the West and surrender to the U.S. forces instead of Soviets. He contacted the headquarters of 84th Infantry Division at Havelberg and tried to negotiate to surrender of whole division. Unfortunately his men were still some distance from Elbe river and was held up by other German units ahead of it. The parts of the division managed to surrender to Americans at Havelberg, while rest was forced to surrender to Soviets near Brandenburg an der Havel. Luz himself was captured by Americans and transported to the United States.

=== Postwar life ===
Luz was interned in Camp Mexia, Texas for two years, before he was released in mid 1947. He then settled in Krün, Bavaria, where he died on April 28, 1980, aged 87. His second son also was killed in action.

== Awards and decorations ==
- Knight's Cross of the Iron Cross on November 15, 1941, as Oberst and commander of Schützen-Regiment 110
- Clasp to the Iron Cross (1939)
  - 2nd Class
  - 1st Class
- Prussian Iron Cross (1914)
  - 2nd Class on October 7, 1914
  - 1st Class on December 15, 1916
- Prussian House Order of Hohenzollern, Knight's Cross with Swords (World War I)
- Bavarian Military Merit Order, 4th Class with Swords and Crown (World War I)
- Bavarian Prince Regent Luitpold Medal (prewar World War I)
- Austrian Military Merit Cross with War Decoration (World War I)
- Eastern Front Medal
- Panzer Badge in Bronze
- Wound Badge (1939) in Black
- Sudetenland Medal with the Prague Castle bar
- Anschluss Medal
- Wehrmacht Long Service Award, 1st Class
- Honour Cross of the World War 1914/1918
- German Social Welfare Decoration, 2nd Class
- Croatian Order of the Crown of King Zvonimir, 1st Class with Star and Oak Leaves
- Bulgarian Order of Bravery, 3rd Class

Military offices
Preceded by Generalleutnant Walter Wißmath	Commander of 199. Infanterie-Division; June 20, 1944 – May 8, 1945	Succeeded by None
