= 362nd Infantry Division =

- German: 362. Infanterie-Division
- Active: 1943 – 1945
- Country: Nazi Germany
- Branch: Army
- Type: Infantry
- Size: Division
- Garrison/HQ: Füssen
- Engagements: Second World War: Italian Campaign

The 362nd Infantry Division (German: 362. Infanterie-Division) was an infantry division of the German Army during the Second World War, active from 1943 to 1945. Formed in Italy, it participated in the Italian Campaign for the entire duration of its war service. It was implicated in the massacre of 97 civilians in what is known as the Benedicta massacre, which occurred at Piedmont in April 1944.

== Operational history ==
The 362nd Infantry Division was formed in Italy, in the area around Rimini, during the period from October to November 1943. It was formally established on 15 November under the command of Generalleutnant (Note: The rank of generalleutnant is equivalent to that of major general in the United States Army.) Heinz Greiner. The division nominally fell within the responsibility of Wehrkreis VII, and was centred on Füssen. It was a Type 44 division, which meant that it had six battalions of infantry in contrast to the nine of a conventional division, and also had less motorised transport.

Its core, including Greiner and his divisional staff, were the remnants of the 268th Infantry Division, which had previously served on the Eastern Front and had recently been disbanded following significant losses incurred in the Battle of Kursk and subsequent retreat. Infantry numbers were boosted with battalions from the 44th, 52nd, 76th and the 305th Infantry Divisions.

Its first engagement was in the Battle of Anzio in January 1944 and when the Allies managed to break through the German defences four months later, the division was overrun. Prior to this, the division was involved in the Benedicta massacre, which occurred at Piedmont between 6 and 7 April 1944, where 97 civilians were executed.

Withdrawn to Rome, the division suffered heavy losses during the Allied advance and had to be rebuilt. Two of its original grenadier regiments were disbanded and were replaced by the 1059th and 1060th Infantry Regiments, transferred from the recently disestablished 92nd Infantry Division. Returning to the front on the Gothic Line, it manned the frontlines near Florence and later at Bologna. During Operation Grapeshot, the last major engagement mounted by the Allied forces on the Italian Front, the division became surrounded near the Po River by the American forces. It surrendered on 23 April 1945. Some elements of the division were overrun by New Zealand forces advancing on Trieste.

== Commanders ==
- Generalleutnant Heinz Greiner (15 November 1943 – 31 December 1944); (Note: Greiner later wrote an account of the division, which was published in 1968.)
- Generalmajor (Note: The rank of generalmajor is equivalent to that of brigadier general in the United States Army.) Max Reinwald (1 January – February 1945; 17 – 23 April 1945);
- Generalmajor Alois Weber (February – 16 April 1945).

== Notes ==
Footnotes

Citations
