= 78th Infantry Division (Wehrmacht) =

78th Infantry Division 78th Assault Division 78th Volksgrenadier Division
- German: 78. Infanterie-Division; 78. Sturm-Division; 78. Volksgrenadier-Division
- Insignia of 78th Infantry-Division (left) and Sturm-Division (right)
- Active: 26 August 1939 — 8 May 1945
- Disbanded: 1945
- Country: Nazi Germany
- Branch: German Army
- Type: Infantry
- Size: Division
- Engagements: World War II: Operation Barbarossa; Battles of Rzhev; Battle of Kursk; Operation Bagration

Commanders
- Notable commanders: Paul Völckers; Hans Traut

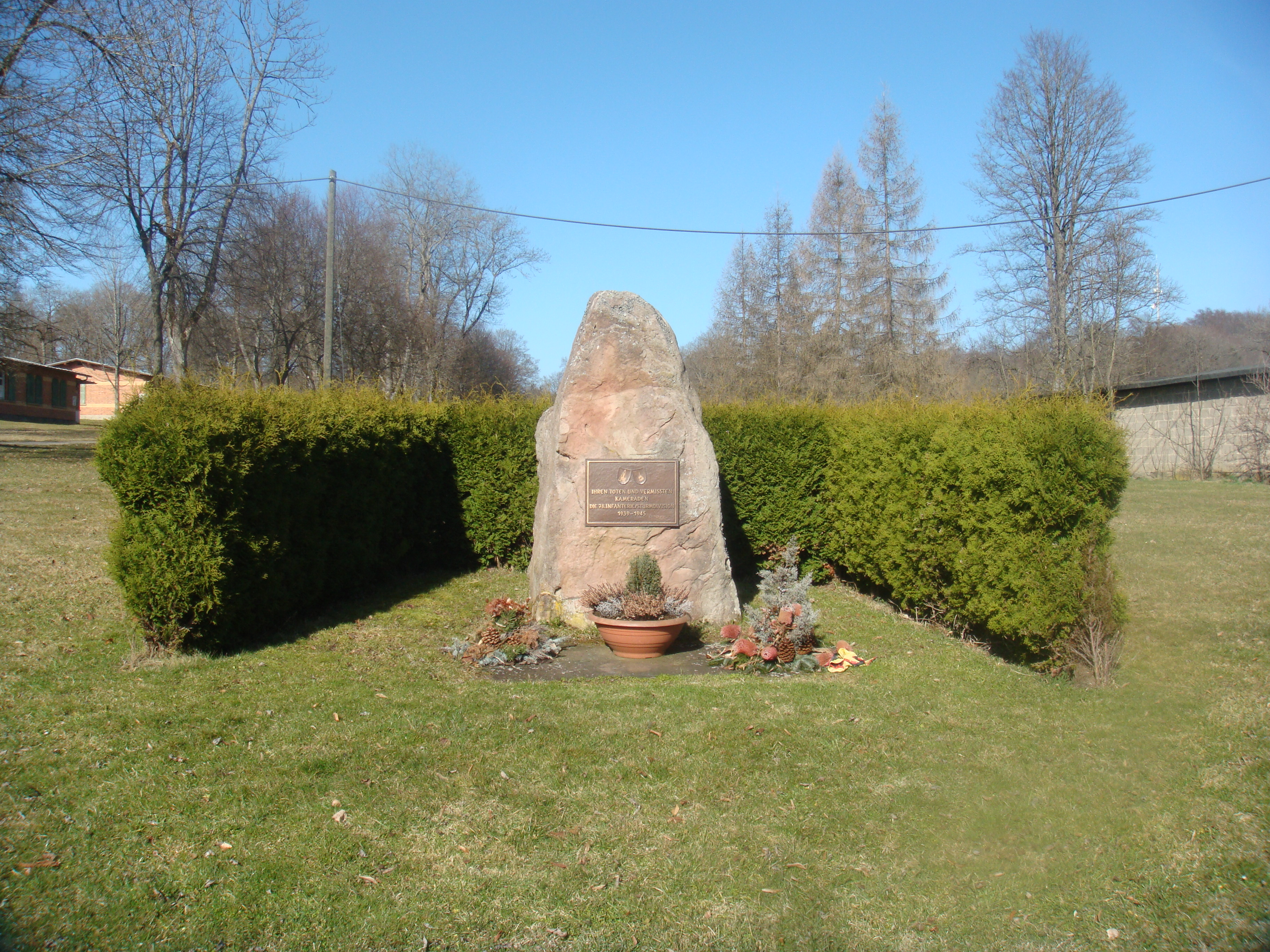

The 78th Infantry Division (German: 78. Infanterie-Division), later known as the 78th Assault Division (78. Sturm-Division), was a German infantry formation which fought during World War II. After the 78th Assault Division was destroyed near Minsk in July 1944, the 78th Volksgrenadier Division (78. Volksgrenadier-Division; formerly 543rd Volksgrenadier Division (543. Volksgrenadier-Division)) was created.

== Unit history ==
The 78th Infantry Division was raised in August 1939 in Stuttgart, incorporating reservists from Baden-Württemberg (its divisional symbol was a representation of Ulm Minster).

It was stationed in France for occupation duties from the summer of 1940 through the spring of 1941, and then transferred east to participate in Operation Barbarossa with Army Group Centre. The division advanced from the Polish border to the gates of Moscow, being halted on 3 December 1941 by the Soviet defences. By January 7, 1942, the division had been pushed back from Ruza to Gzhatsk where the Soviet winter offensive was halted. The division then formed the South East flank of the Rzhev-Vyazma Salient. Late in 1942 it suffered heavy losses in the Rzhev battles.

At the beginning of 1943 it was reorganised as the 78th Sturm Division (a new divisional symbol, an armoured fist, being adopted, derived from the artificial hand of Götz von Berlichingen) with additional adjustments to its strength and organisation over the next several months. Each of its three infantry regiments was redesignated as a Sturm-Regiment. The designation Sturm (assault) reflected the division's increased strength, which eventually included subordinate Sturmgeschutz (assault gun) Heavy Mortar and Nebelwerfer (rocket launcher) battalions and a tank destroyer unit equipped with Marder IIs, as well as extra regimental artillery support. With its new organisation, the division took part in Operation Citadel as part of the XXIII Corps of the Ninth Army, being involved in the fighting at Ponyri. During the following Soviet Counteroffensive the division was first transferred from the Ninth Army to the Second Panzer Army in July, then again to the Fourth Army in September where the division was forced back to the Panther-Wotan line East of Orsha.

During the June - July 1944 Soviet offensive against Army Group Centre, Operation Bagration, the division was assigned to defend the main Moscow - Minsk road and the town of Orsha. During the fighting the division was destroyed, having failed to break out of an encirclement east of Minsk on the night of 5/6 July. Surviving elements were taken over by the 565th Volksgrenadier Division.

=== 78th Volksgrenadier Division ===
Later that month, the division was reconstituted as the 78th Grenadier Division, by renaming the 543rd Volksgrenadier Division then in the process of forming. In October 1944 it was renamed as 78th Volksgrenadier Division, and in early 1945 renamed again to 78th Volks-Sturm Division, being assigned to Army Group Centre. It was among the forces of the First Panzer Army pushed from Upper Silesia into Czechoslovakia, where its troops surrendered to the Soviets near Olomouc at the end of the war in May.

On 1 January 1945, the 78th Volksgrenadier Division (then under 17th Army of Army Group A) had a strength of 9,715 men.

== Commanding officers ==
Rank and name	Date
78. Infanterie-Division
General der Artillerie Fritz Brand	1 September 1939 - 1 October 1939
General der Artillerie Curt Gallenkamp	1 October 1939 - 29 September 1941
Generalleutnant Emil Markgraf	29 September 1941 - 19 November 1941
General der Infanterie Paul Völckers	19 November 1941 - 30 December 1942
78. Sturm-Division
General der Infanterie Paul Völckers	30 December 1942 - 1 April 1943
Generalleutnant Hans Traut	1 April 1943 - 1 November 1943
Generalleutnant Heribert von Larisch	1 November 1943 - 15 February 1944
General der Infanterie Siegfried Rasp	15 February 1944 - 12 July 1944
Generalleutnant Hans Traut	15 February 1944 - 12 July 1944
General der Infanterie Siegfried Rasp	12 July 1944 - 18 July 1944
78. Grenadier-Division
General der Infanterie Siegfried Rasp	18 July 1944 - 23 September 1944
Generalmajor Alois Weber	23 September 1944 - 9 October 1944
78. Volksgrenadier-Division
Generalmajor Alois Weber	9 October 1944 - 1 December 1944
Generalleutnant Harald von Hirschfeld	1 December 1944 - 18 January 1945
Generalmajor Wilhelm Nagel	18 January 1945 - February 1945
78. Volks-Sturm-Division
Generalmajor Wilhelm Nagel	February 1945 - 1 May 1945
Generalmajor Erich Geißler	1 May 1945 - 8 May 1945

== Order of battle (1944) ==
- 78. Division Headquarters
  - 78. Mapping Detachment (mot.)
  - Military Police Platoon
  - Panzerjäger Platoon
  - Flak Platoon
- 14. Assault Regiment
  - Staff Company
  - Motorcycle Platoon
  - Infantry Gun Company
  - Panzerjäger Company
  - Pioneer Company
  - 2 x Battalions
    - Battalion Staff
    - 3 x Companies (mot.)
    - Machine Gun Company (mot.)
    - Mortar Company
    - Flak Platoon
- 195. Assault Regiment
  - Staff Company
  - Motorcycle Platoon
  - Infantry Gun Company
  - Panzerjäger Company
  - Pioneer Company
  - 2 x Battalions
    - Battalion Staff
    - 3 x Companies (mot.)
    - Machine Gun Company (mot.)
    - Mortar Company
    - Flak Platoon
- 215. Assault Regiment
  - Staff Company
  - Motorcycle Platoon
  - Infantry Gun Company
  - Panzerjäger Company
  - Pioneer Company
  - 2 x Battalions
    - Battalion Staff
    - 3 x Companies (mot.)
    - Machine Gun Company (mot.)
    - Mortar Company
    - Flak Platoon
- 178. Reconnaissance Battalion
  - Staff Company
  - 3 x Companies (mot.)
  - Motorcycle Platoon
  - Machine Gun Platoon
- 178. Panzerjäger Battalion
  - Staff Company
  - 2 x Panzerjäger Companies (self-propelled)
- 519. Heavy Panzerjäger Battalion
  - Staff Company
  - 3 x Panzerjäger Companies (self-propelled)
- 198. Assault Gun Brigade
  - Staff Company
  - 3 x Sturmgeschütz Companies
- 178. Artillery Regiment
  - Staff Battery (mot.)
  - 3 x Light Artillery Battalions
    - 3 x Batteries (mot.)
  - 1 x Medium Artillery Battalion
    - 3 x Batteries (mot.)
- 178. Pioneer Battalion
  - Staff Company
  - 3 x Pioneer Companies (mot.)
- 5. Mortar Battalion
  - Staff Company
  - 2 x Heavy Mortar Companies (mot.)
- 293. Heavy Flak Battaltion
  - Staff Company
  - 3 x Flak Companies (mot.)
- Supply and Support Units

== Sources ==
=== Literature ===
- Gudmundsson, Bruce I. (1993). On Artillery. Praeger.
- Gudmundsson, Bruce I. On Armour.
