= 199th Infantry Division (Wehrmacht) =

Division of the German Heer during World War II

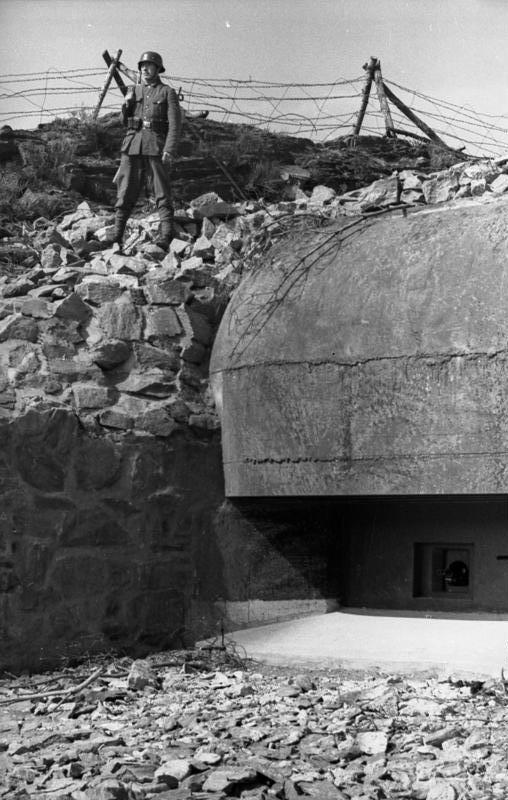

The 199th Infantry Division (German: 199. Infanterie-Division) was an infantry division of the German Heer during World War II.

== History ==
The 199th Infantry Division was formed on 1 November 1940 in occupied Norway, with Hans von Kempski as the initial divisional commander. It was assembled at the same time as the divisions of the 13th and 14th Aufstellungswelle, but is considered part of neither, and is instead counted as part of the 7th. The initial divisional personnel was drawn from other divisions in occupied Norway, including the 69th, 163rd, 181st, 196th, and 214th Infantry Divisions. The initial divisional staff was taken from the staff of the Commander of Rear Army Area Norway (German: Kommandeur rückwärtiges Armeegebiet Norwegen), initially formed on 10 January 1940 as Field Command 673. Additional personnel was taken from Landwehr formations.

Initially, the 199th Infantry Division consisted of the Infantry Regiments 341, 345, and 357, as well as the Artillery Regiment 199. These regiments were staffed as follows:

- Infantry Regiment 341 took its staff from the staff of Infantry Regiment 307, its 1st Battalion from the 1st Battalion of Infantry Regiment 310, its 2nd Battalion from the 2nd Battalion of Infantry Regiment 307, and its 3rd Battalion from the 1st (Jäger) Battalion of Infantry Regiment 349. The former three battalions were taken from the 163rd Infantry Division, the latter battalion from the 181st Infantry Division.
- Infantry Regiment 345 was as a whole taken from the 196th Infantry Division, where it had previously served.
- Infantry Regiment 357 took its staff from Infantry Regiment 236, its 1st Battalion from the 1st Battalion of Infantry Regiment 355, its 2nd Battalion from the 1st Battalion of Infantry Regiment 357, and its 3rd Battalion from the 3rd Battalion of Infantry Regiment 159. The first and last of these formations served with the 69th Infantry Division, the middle two with the 214th Infantry Division.
- Artillery Regiment 199 took its staff from the staff of Artillery Regiment 214, its 1st Detachment from the 1st Detachment of Artillery Regiment 233, its 2nd Detachment from the 6th and 9th Batteries of Artillery Regiment 222, as well as the 7th Battery of Artillery Regiment 234. The 3rd Detachment was formed from the 3rd Detachment of Artillery Regiment 169, with the 1st and 2nd Batteries of Artillery Regiment 169 and the 1st Battery of Artillery Regiment 214. In total, Artillery Regiment 199 was taken from elements of the 69th, 181st, and 196th Infantry Division.

The military value of the 199th Infantry Division was estimated to be low within the Wehrmacht, and it was kept away from combat until the very end of the war. In late 1940, the division was sent to Oslo. Between June 1941 and February 1945, the 199th Infantry Division was on garrison duty in the Narvik area.

On 1 April 1942, Kempski was replaced as divisional commander by Wilhelm Raithel. On 1 June 1942, Infantry Regiment 341 as well as the 3rd Detachment of Artillery Regiment 199 (the latter redesignated Artillery Detachment 270) were transferred to the 270th Infantry Division. As a result, the 199th Infantry Division was switched to a binary model, as it was left with only two Infantry Regiments.

On 1 August 1943, Raithel was replaced as divisional commander by Walter Wissmath. Wissmath was in turn replaced by Helwig Luz on 20 June 1944. Luz would command the 199th Infantry Division until the end of the war.

In early 1945, the 199th Infantry Division was strengthened with several smaller army formations, including the Fortress Battalions 649, 651, 652, and 1014. These battalions were overseen by elements of the staff of Fortress Infantry Regiment 856.

In 1945, the division was rushed to Germany to assist in the Wehrmacht's desperate defensive measures. Before deployment in the Berlin area, the third battalions of the Grenadier Regiments 345 and 357 were used to form a third Grenadier Regiment, numbered 373. This technically returned the 199th Infantry Division from a binary to a ternary model, but the actual fighting strength of the division remained at six infantry battalions.

The 199th Infantry Division was largely captured by Red Army forces in Mark Brandenburg. Smaller elements escaped via Havelberg to instead go into American captivity.

== Superior formations ==
Organizational chart of the 199th Infantry Division
Year	Month	Commander	Army Corps	Army	Area
1940	November – December	Hans von Kempski	Army Reserves	Group XXI	Norway
1941	January – May	Hans von Kempski	Army Reserves	Armee Norwegen	Norway
1941	June – July	Hans von Kempski	Mountain Corps Norway	Armee Norwegen	Norway
1941	August – December	Hans von Kempski	Abschnitts-Stab Nord-Norwegen	Armee Norwegen	Norway
1942	January – February	Hans von Kempski	Abschnitts-Stab Nord-Norwegen	Armee Norwegen	Norway
1942	March – December	Wilhelm Raithel	LXXI Army Corps	Armee Norwegen	Norway
1943	January – July	Wilhelm Raithel	LXXI Army Corps	Armee Norwegen	Norway
1943	August – December	Walter Wissmath	LXXI Army Corps	Armee Norwegen	Norway
1944	January – June	Walter Wissmath	LXXI Army Corps	Armee Norwegen	Norway
1944	July – December	Helwig Luz	LXXI Army Corps	Armee Norwegen	Norway
1945	January – February	Helwig Luz	LXXI Army Corps	20th Mountain Army	Norway
1945	March	Helwig Luz	XXXIII Army Corps	20th Mountain Army	Norway
1945	April	Helwig Luz	Wehrmachtbefehlshaber Dänemark	None	Denmark
1945	May	Helwig Luz	Unclear		Germany

== Noteworthy individuals ==
- Hans von Kempski, divisional commander of the 199th Infantry Division (1 November 1940 – 1 April 1942).
- Wilhelm Raithel, divisional commander of the 199th Infantry Division (1 April 1942 – 1 August 1943).
- Walter Wissmath, divisional commander of the 199th Infantry Division (1 August 1943 – 20 June 1944).
- Helwig Luz, divisional commander of the 199th Infantry Division (20 June 1944 – May 1945).
