= 257th Infantry Division =

1939-1945 combat formation of the German Army

- 257. Infanterie-Division
- Active: September 1939 – August 1944
- Country: Nazi Germany
- Branch: Army
- Type: Infantry
- Size: Division
- Engagements: World War II: Odessa Offensive

The 257th Infantry Division (German: 257. Infanterie-Division) was an infantry division of the German Army during World War II.

The division was destroyed in combat in August 1944 and formally dissolved on 9 October 1944. The division was redeployed as the 257th Volksgrenadier Division (German: 257. Volks-Grenadier-Division) on 13 October 1944, using personnel from the 587th Volksgrenadier Division.

== History ==
=== 257th Infantry Division ===
The 257th Infantry Division was formed in Berlin-Karlshorst in Wehrkreis III as a division of the fourth Aufstellungswelle on 26 August 1939, the day of German mobilization. It initially consisted of the Infantry Regiments 457, 466, and 477, as well as the Artillery Regiment 257. The three infantry regiments of the division took their initial battalions from several reserve formations of Wehrkreis III, including Infantry Regiment 8 (Frankfurt an der Oder), Infantry Regiment 9 (Wittenberg), Infantry Regiment 39 (Grünberg in Schlesien), Infantry Regiment 67 (Berlin-Spandau), Infantry Regiment 68 (Rathenow), and Infantry Regiment 150 (Berlin-Tegel). The initial commander of the 257th Infantry Division was Max von Viebahn.

After the Invasion of Poland, in which the division served a reserve role under Army Group South, it was used as an occupation force in the Kraków sector.

On 29 January 1940, the 257th Infantry Division passed an infantry battalion of the 466th Regiment to the 293rd Infantry Division of the eighth Aufstellungswelle.

In June 1940, during the Battle of France, the 257th Infantry Division stood opposite the Maginot Line, under the supervision of Army Group C. After the conclusion of the western campaign, the division was transferred back to Poland.

On 4 October 1940, a third of the division was transferred to the 123rd Infantry Division of the eleventh Aufstellungswelle.

Karl Sachs took command of the division on 1 March 1941.

Between June 1941 and the summer of 1942, the 257th Infantry Division fought continuous battles in the German-Soviet war. It engaged in combat at Uman and participated in the encirclement of Kiev. On 30 June 1941, elements of the division captured Bóbrka. At the end of the year 1941, the 257th Infantry Division engaged in defensive operations against the Soviet winter campaign of 1941–42.

In May 1942, the division fought in the Second Battle of Kharkov. The 257th Infantry Division was now commanded by Karl Gümbel, who had assumed his post on 1 May 1942. Gümbel would be shortly replaced by Carl Püchler on 1 June.

On 5 November 1943, Anton Reichard von Mauchenheim genannt Bechtolsheim assumed command of the division.

On 2 July 1944, Friedrich Blümke assumed command of the division.

In August 1944, the 257th Infantry Division was destroyed while under the supervision of Army Group South. It was formally dissolved on 9 October 1944. Its final commander, appointed on 1 October 1944, had been Erich Seidel.

=== 257th Volksgrenadier Division ===
257th Volksgrenadier Division
- 257. Volksgrenadier-Division
- Active: October 1944 – May 1945
- Country: Nazi Germany
- Branch: Army
- Type: Infantry
- Size: Division
- Engagements: World War II

The 257th Volksgrenadier Division was activated on 13 October 1944, using survivors of the 257th Infantry Division as well as the personnel of Shadow Division Groß-Görschen, also known as the 587th Volksgrenadier Division, a division of the thirty-second Aufstellungswelle. The Grenadier Regiments of the 257th Volksgrenadier Division were still numbered 457, 466, and 477, as they had been under the 257th Infantry Division.

The 257th Volksgrenadier Division was captured by United States Army forces at Füssen in May 1945.

The 257th Volksgrenadier Division's only commander was Erich Seidel.

== Superior formations ==
Organizational chart of the 257th Infantry Division
Year	Month	Army Corps	Army	Army Group	Area
As "257th Infantry Division", September 1939 – October 1944
1939	September	Army Group reserves.		Army Group South	Kraków
1939	December	XXIV	1st Army	Army Group C	Saarpfalz
1940	January	Army reserves.	1st Army	Army Group C	Saarpfalz
1940	May	XXIV	1st Army	Army Group C	Saarpfalz
1940	June	XXXVII	1st Army	Army Group C	Maginot Line
1940	July – August	XXXIV	18th Army	None.	Poland
1940	September – December	XXXIV	12th Army	Army Group B	Poland
1941	January – April	XXXIV	17th Army	Army Group B	South Poland
1941	May	XXXIV	17th Army	Army Group A	South Poland
1941	June – July	XXXXIX	17th Army	Army Group South	Lviv, Vinnytsia
1941	August	LII	17th Army	Army Group South	Uman
1941	September	XI	17th Army	Army Group South	Dnieper
1941	October	LII	17th Army	Army Group South	Kiev
1941	November – December	XXXXIV	17th Army	Army Group South	Donetsk
1942	January – May	XXXXIV	17th Army	Army Group South	Donetsk
1942	June – July	XXXXIV	1st Panzer Army	Army Group South	Donetsk
1942	August	Army Group reserves.		Army Group D	France
1942	September	LXXXIII	Felber	Army Group D	Champagne
1942	October – December	XXV	7th Army	Army Group D	Brittany
1943	January – March	XXV	7th Army	Army Group D	Brittany
1943	April	In transit.	1st Panzer Army	Army Group South	Donetsk
1943	May – September	XXXX	1st Panzer Army	Army Group South	Donetsk
1943	October – December	XXX	1st Panzer Army	Army Group South	Kryvyi Rih
1944	January	XXX	6th Army	Army Group South	Nikopol
1944	February	LVII	6th Army	Army Group South	Nikopol
1944	March	LVII	6th Army	Army Group A	Tighina
1944	April – July	XXX	6th Army	Army Group South Ukraine	Kishinev
1944	August	"Status unknown", according to German records. In reality: Destroyed in combat.			
As "257th Volksgrenadier Division", October 1944 – May 1945
1944	October – December	In deployment.			
1945	January	LXXXX	1st Army	Army Group G	Lower Alsace
1945	February – March	LXXXIX	1st Army	Army Group G	Saarpfalz
1945	April	LXIV	19th Army	Oberbefehlshaber West	Karlsruhe / Danube

== Noteworthy individuals ==
- Max von Viebahn, divisional commander between 26 August 1939 and 1 March 1941.
- Karl Sachs, divisional commander between 1 March 1941 and 1 May 1942.
- Karl Gümbel, divisional commander between 1 May 1942 and 1 June 1942.
- Carl Püchler, divisional commander between 1 June 1942 and 5 November 1943.
- Anton Reichard von Mauchenheim genannt Bechtolsheim, divisional commander between 5 November 1943 and 2 July 1944.
- Friedrich Blümke, divisional commander between 2 July 1944 and 1 October 1944.
- Erich Seidel, divisional commander between 1 October 1944 and May 1945.
