= Max Reinwald =

WW2 German Army general (1903-1969)

- Born: 1 September 1903
- Died: 8 June 1969 (aged 65)
- Military career
- Allegiance: Nazi Germany
- Branch: Army (Wehrmacht)
- Rank: Generalmajor
- Commands: 362nd Infantry Division
- Conflicts: World War II
- Awards: Knight's Cross of the Iron Cross with Oak Leaves

Max Reinwald (1 September 1903 – 8 June 1969) was a general in the Wehrmacht of Nazi Germany who commanded the 362nd Infantry Division during World War II. He was a recipient of the Knight's Cross of the Iron Cross with Oak Leaves.

== Awards and decorations ==
- Iron Cross (1939) 2nd Class (24 October 1939) & 1st Class (14 June 1940)
- German Cross in Gold on 19 December 1941 as Oberleutnant in the 1./Infanterie-Regiment 19
- Knight's Cross of the Iron Cross with Oak Leaves
  - Knight's Cross on 29 February 1944 as Oberstleutnant of the Reserves and commander of Grenadier-Regiment 19
  - 702nd Oak Leaves on 18 January 1945 as Oberst of the Reserves and commander of Grenadier-Regiment 19

Military offices
Preceded by Generalleutnant Heinrich Greiner	Commander of 362nd Infantry Division; 1 January 1945 – February 1945	Succeeded by Generalmajor Alois Weber
