= 268th Infantry Division =

- 268. Infanterie-Division
- Division insignia
- Active: 1939–1943
- Country: Nazi Germany
- Allegiance: Army
- Type: Infantry
- Size: Division

Commanders
- Notable commanders: Erich Straube; Heinz Greiner

The 268th Infantry Division (German: 268. Infanterie-Division) was a German Army division active and operating during the Second World War.

== Operational history ==
The division was raised in August 1939 as part of the fourth mobilisation wave, consisting of Bavarian soldiers from Wehkreis VII. It was placed under the command of Major General Erich Straube. Although formed during the preparation for the upcoming invasion of Poland, the 268th was initially stationed in the Saarland - the Franco-German border. During the Battle of France, the division was stationed with Lieutenant General Gotthard Heinrici's XII Corps, of the 1st Army. It was later moved to Poland in September 1940. In January 1940, portions of the officer complements were moved to the newly activated 297th Infantry Division. In June of the same year, further significant portions of the 268th's officer complements were moved, this time to the 132nd Infantry Division.

On 1 June 1941 its commanding officer, Straube, was promoted to Lieutenant General, as German forces prepared for Operation Barbarossa, which the division was to take part in. It was made a component of General of the Artillery Wilhelm Fahrmbacher's VII Army Corps, itself part of Army Group Centre's Second Army. The division took part in successful actions in the opening weeks, with the Brest Fortress being stormed and large portions of the Soviet Western Front being encircled at the Battle of Białystok–Minsk.

The 268th was present on 23 July as German forces attacked the Smolensk Pocket. As Soviet Field Marshal Semyon Timoshenko began to assemble forces for a counter-offensive, this put strain on both Heinz Guderian's 2nd and Hermann Hoth's 3rd Panzer Groups. As such, Field Marshal Fedor von Bock, commanding officer of Army Group Centre, had the division transferred under Guderian's command as part of XX Corps. The Corps' duty was to take control of the El'nia sector, which was to capture a bridgehead nearby.

On 26 July a number of 2nd Army Group divisions were moved northward to reinforce Hoth's 3rd Panzer Group as it prepared to seal Soviet troops in Smolensk within a pocket - the 106th and 268th divisions arrived by 3 August, with another three arriving over the next three days. The Yelnya bridgehead was captured by August 8 and defended by XX Army Corps, relieving the 10th Panzer and the 2nd-SS Panzer Divisions, as the Soviets attempted another attack. In the following week, more than 2500 men in the Corps were killed, many of whom being of the division's battalion-level line officers.

The 268th's participated in action near Yelnya at the end of August, leading to a (though minor) German withdrawal. As German forces attempted to attack Moscow with Operation Typhoon, the Red Army began to attack near Rzhev and Vyazma in November. In December it was assigned to XXIV Corps in the 2nd Panzer Army, and in January 1942 to XIII Corps in the 4th Army.

In January 1942, Lieutenant General Straube was replaced as commanding officer by Major General Heinrich Greiner. In February 1942 it was assigned to XII Corps, with which it served until August 1943. In January 1943, Greiner was promoted to the rank of Lieutenant General. The division sustained heavy losses during the Battle of Kursk, pulling back at diminished size to Bryansk and later Mogilev. It was after this that the division, reduced to a regimental-strength, was formerly disbanded as a division, after having been renamed "Division Group 268" and placed within the 36th Motorized Division. The divisional staff had already been moved to the newly formed 362nd Infantry Division.

== Commanders ==
- Lieutenant General Erich Straube, 1 September 1939 – 6 January 1942
- Lieutenant General Heinz Greiner, 6 January 1942 – Nov 1943

== Components ==
- 468th Infantry Regiment
- 488th Infantry Regiment
- 499th Infantry Regiment
- 268th Artillery Regiment
- 268th Reconnaissance Battalion
- 268th Anti-Tank Battalion
- 268th Engineer Battalion
- 268th Signal Battalion
- 268th Field-Replacement Battalion
- 268th Divisional Supply Troops
