= Karl Gümbel =

- Born: 24 June 1888
- Died: 28 October 1970 (aged 82)
- Military career
- Allegiance: Nazi Germany
- Branch: Army
- Service years: 1914–1920; 1935–1945
- Rank: Generalleutnant
- Commands: 295. Infanterie-Division; 257. Infanterie-Division; 182. Reserve-Division; 348. Infanterie-Division
- Conflicts: World War II
- Awards: Knight's Cross of the Iron Cross

Karl Gümbel (24 June 1888 – 28 October 1970) was a general in the Wehrmacht of Nazi Germany during World War II. He was a recipient of the Knight's Cross of the Iron Cross.

== Awards and decorations ==
- Knight's Cross of the Iron Cross on 30 October 1941 as Oberst and commander of Infanterie-Regiment 516

Military offices
Preceded by Generalleutnant Herbert Geitner	Commander of 295. Infanterie-Division; 9 December 1941 – 2 May 1942	Succeeded by General der Artillerie Rolf Wuthmann
Preceded by General der Pionere Karl Sachs	Commander of 257. Infanterie-Division; 1 May 1942 – 30 May 1942	Succeeded by General der Infanterie Carl Püchler
Preceded by Previously Division Nr. 182	Commander of 182. Reserve-Division; 5 June 1942 - 27 September 1942	Succeeded by Generalmajor Paul Lettow
Preceded by None	Commander of 348. Infanterie-Division; 27 September 1942 – 5 February 1944	Succeeded by Generalleutnant Paul Seyffardt
