= Erich Geißler =

- Born: 11 December 1895
- Died: 2 May 1967 (aged 71)
- Military career
- Allegiance: German Empire; Weimar Republic; Nazi Germany
- Branch: Army
- Service years: 1914–1920; 1924–1945
- Rank: Generalmajor
- Commands: 78th Infantry Division
- Conflicts: World War II
- Awards: Knight's Cross of the Iron Cross

Erich Geißler (11 December 1895 – 2 May 1967) was a German general in the Wehrmacht during World War II. He was a recipient of the Knight's Cross of the Iron Cross of Nazi Germany.

== Awards and decorations ==
- Knight's Cross of the Iron Cross on 29 July 1942 as Oberst and commander of Infanterie-Regiment 200 (motorized) in DAK

Military offices
Preceded by Generalmajor Wilhelm Nagel	Commander of 78. Volkssturm-Division; 1 May 1945 – 8 May 1945	Succeeded by None
