= Heinz Greiner =

- Born: 12 August 1895; Amberg, Regierungsbezirk Oberpfalz, Kingdom of Bavaria, German Empire
- Died: 19 November 1977 (aged 82); Rottach-Egern, Bavaria, West Germany
- Relatives: ∞ 1922 Adele Diehl; 2 sons
- Military career
- Allegiance: German Empire; Weimar Republic; Nazi Germany
- Branch: Imperial German Army; Reichsheer; German Army
- Service years: 1914–45
- Rank: Generalleutnant
- Commands: 268th Infantry Division; 362nd Infantry Division
- Conflicts: World War I World War II: Invasion of Poland; Battle of France; Operation Barbarossa; Battle of Białystok–Minsk; Battle of Smolensk (1941); Yelnya Offensive; Battle of Moscow; Battle of Smolensk (1943); Italian Campaign; Operation Diadem; Battle of Monte Cassino; Battle of Garfagnana; Gothic Line Offensive; Operation Grapeshot
- Awards: Knight's Cross of the Iron Cross with Oak Leaves
- Other work: Military writer (tactics and military history)

Heinrich "Heinz" Greiner (12 August 1895 – 19 November 1977) was a German general in the Wehrmacht during World War II. He was a recipient of the Knight's Cross of the Iron Cross with Oak Leaves of Nazi Germany.

== Life ==
Heinrich Greiner joined the Bavarian Army as an officer candidate (Fahnenjunker) with the Royal Bavarian 13th Infantry Regiment "Franz Josef I, Emperor of Austria and Apostolic King of Hungary" (based in Ingolstadt) on 3 August 1914. In June 1915, he was promoted to the rank of 2nd lieutenant (Leutnant) with a patent date of 15 November 1913. He served as an officer during the First World War. Following the end of the war, he was accepted into the Reichswehr and assigned to the 19th Infantry Regiment.

By 1923 (promoted to 1st lieutenant on 1 October 1923), he was serving in the regiment’s 8th (Machine Gun) Company; by 1930, having been promoted to captain (Hauptmann) on 1 June 1928, he held the position of commander of the 19th Infantry Regiment’s 14th Company. On 1 January 1935, he became an instructor at the Munich War School (Kriegsschule München). From 1936 onward, Greiner was active as an author of military texts and books (initially together with Joachim Degener.

=== World War II ===
On 10 November 1938, he became commander of the III Battalion of Infantry Regiment 63, part of the 27th Infantry Division—a position he held beyond the outbreak of the Second World War. The regiment took part in the Polish campaign. Subsequently, from 1 February 1940, until its reorganization in mid-October 1940, he served as commander of Infantry Regiment 63, which he led during the campaign in the West. On 8 October 1940, he was appointed head of the Regulations Office under the General of the Infantry at the Army High Command (OKH); in this capacity, he was promoted to the rank of Colonel (Oberst) on 1 November 1940. From 20 April 1941, he commanded Infantry Regiment 499, part of the 268th Infantry Division.

During Operation Barbarossa, Greiner reached divisional-level command. The division was destroyed in the Soviet Operation Bagration in the summer of 1944, along with much of Army Group Centre. Greiner was transferred to Italy, where he took command of the 362nd Infantry Division. Losses were so heavy in the division in Italy that a bit of doggerel made the rounds:

The division of Greiner
Gets chopped ever finer
Until roll call's a one liner
That simply says: Greiner.

From 12 April 1945, until the end of the war, he served as commander of Military District VII (Munich); in this capacity, he also succeeded General of the Infantry Karl Kriebel, taking over the duties of Commanding General of the Deputy General Command of the VII Army Corps. On 17 April 1945, Greiner designated the Danube as the main line of resistance and declared his intention to hold the city of Ingolstadt—where he had previously served in the Reichswehr—at all costs. In the end, no actual defense of the city took place. Although a few bridges were blown up, the city surrendered as early as 27 April 1945.

At the time of the Wehrmacht's capitulation on 8 May 1945, he fell into American captivity, from which he was released in 1947.

== Awards and decorations ==
- Iron Cross (1914), 2nd and 1st Class
  - 2nd Class on 4 December 1914
  - 1st Class on 25 November 1918
- Military Merit Order (Bavaria), 4th Class with Swords (BMV4bX/BM4X) on 9 November 1917
- Military Merit Cross (Austria-Hungary), 3rd Class with the War Decoration (ÖM3K) on 25 July 1915
- Wound Badge (1918) in Black
- Honor saber for excellent rifle marksmanship on 24 November 1928
- Honour Cross of the World War 1914/1918 with Swords
- Wehrmacht Long Service Award, 4th to 1st Class
  - 2nd Class on 2 October 1936
  - 1st Class on 3 August 1939
- German Rider's Badge in Silver on 15 May 1939
- Repetition Clasp 1939 to the Iron Cross 1914, 2nd and 1st Class
  - 2nd Class on 4 October 1939
  - 1st Class on 10 October 1939
- Wound Badge (1939) in Black on 6 June 1940
- Winter Battle in the East 1941–42 Medal on 8 July 1942
- Referenced by name in the Wehrmachtbericht on 2 June 1944
- Medal for Gallantry and Merit for Members of the Eastern Peoples, 1st Class in Silver on 30 June 1944
- Knight's Cross of the Iron Cross with Oak Leaves
  - Knight's Cross on 22 September 1941 as Colonel (Oberst ) and commander of Grenadier Regiment 499.
  - 572nd Oak Leaves on 5 September 1944 as Generalleutnant and commander of the 362nd Infantry Division

== Sources ==
- German Federal Archives: BArch PERS 6/585 and PERS 6/299745

Military offices
Preceded by Generalleutnant Erich Straube	Commander of 268th Infantry Division; 6 January 1942 – November 1943	Succeeded by Unit disbanded
Preceded by None	Commander of 362nd Infantry Division; November 1943 – 1 January 1945	Succeeded by Generalmajor Max Reinwald
