= Willi Moser =

German general (1887–1946)

- Born: 2 November 1887; Breslau, Province of Silesia, Kingdom of Prussia, German Empire
- Died: 18 October 1946 (aged 58); Prison No. 1/Sverdlovsk, USSR
- Relatives: ∞ 1924 Anne Marie Huch; 2 daughters
- Military career
- Allegiance: German Empire; Weimar Republic; Nazi Germany
- Branch: Prussian Army; Imperial German Army; Freikorps; Reichswehr; Heer
- Service years: 1906–45
- Rank: General der Artillerie
- Commands: 299. Infanterie-Division; LXXI. Armeekorps
- Conflicts: World War I World War II: Poland Campaign; Battle of France; Operation Barbarossa; Battle of Kiev (1941); Defence of the Reich
- Awards: Knight's Cross of the Iron Cross

Willi Moser (2 November 1887 – 18 October 1946) was a German general during World War II who commanded the LXXI Army Corps. He was a recipient of the Knight's Cross of the Iron Cross of Nazi Germany.

== Death ==
Moser was taken prisoner by Soviet troops in 1945 and died in Soviet captivity from hunger, deprivation and pulmonary tuberculosis on 18 October 1946.

== Promotions ==
- 22 March 1906 Charakter als Fähnrich (honorary / brevet Officer Cadet)
- 17 November 1906 Fähnrich (Officer Cadet)
- 16 August 1907 Leutnant (2nd Lieutenant)
- 27 January 1915 Oberleutnant (1st Lieutenant)
- 25 November 1916 Hauptmann (Captain)
- 1 February 1930 Major (3)
- 1 February 1934 Oberstleutnant (Lieutenant Colonel) with effect and Rank Seniority (RDA) from 1 January 1934 (9)
- 1 October 1935 Oberst (Colonel) with RDA from 1 October 1935 (32)
- 31 July 1939 Generalmajor (Major General) with effect and RDA from 1 August 1939 (4)
- 12 July 1941 Generalleutnant (Lieutenant General) with effect and RDA from 1 August 1941 (3)
- 16 November 1942 General der Artillerie (General of the Artillery) with effect and RDA from 1 December 1942 (5)

== Awards and decorations ==
- Iron Cross (1914), 2nd and 1st Class
  - 2nd Class on 26 November 1914
  - 1st Class on 16 May 1915
- Baden Order of the Zähringer Lion, Knight's Cross 2nd Class with Swords (BZ3bX) on 4 August 1915
- Württemberg Friedrich Order, Knight's Cross 2nd Class with Swords (WF3bX) on 6 December 1915
- Silesian Eagle, 2nd Grade
- Honour Cross of the World War 1914/1918 with Swords
- Wehrmacht Long Service Award, 4th to 1st Class on 2 October 1936
- Repetition Clasp 1939 to the Iron Cross 1914, 2nd and 1st Class
  - 2nd Class on 20 September 1939
  - 1st Class on 1 November 1939
- Wound Badge (1939) in Black on 23 December 1941
- German Cross in Gold on 1 June 1942 (alternative sources state 27 May 1942)
- Winter Battle in the East 1941–42 Medal on 12 August 1942
- Knight's Cross of the Iron Cross on 26 October 1941 as Generalleutnant and Commander of 299. Infanterie-Division

Military offices
Preceded by none	Commander of 299. Infanterie-Division; 6 April 1940 - 1 November 1942	Succeeded by Generalleutnant Viktor Koch
Preceded by General der Infanterie Emmerich Nagy	Commander of LXXI. Armeekorps; 1 November 1942 – 15 December 1944	Succeeded by General der Artillerie Anton Bechtolsheim
