= Operation Victory from God =

Military operation in the Yemeni Civil War

- Part of the Saudi Arabian–Yemeni border conflict (2015–present), the Yemeni Civil War (2014–present), and the Saudi Arabian-led intervention in Yemen
- Map of the operation's last stage Houthi forces Saudi-led forces
Date	25 August – late September 2019
Location	Saudi Arabia–Yemen border
Result	Houthi victory: Saudi forces encircled and destroyed

Belligerents
Yemen (Supreme Political Council): Houthi movement	Saudi Arabia: Allied Yemeni tribal forces loyal to the Hadi government

Commanders and leaders
Mohammad Nasser al Atefi (Supreme Political Council defense minister)	Brig. Gen. Musa Bin Dhaher Al-Balawi (joint operations commander); Radad al-Hashemi (Al-Fateh Brigade)

Units involved
Houthi fighters Popular Committees; Drone, missile and air defence units	Armed Forces of Saudi Arabia: Saudi Arabian Army; Royal Saudi Air Force; Saudi Arabian National Guard; Al-Fateh Brigade

Strength
Several infantry, armored, and missile battalions (thousands of fighters)	At least 3 brigades

Casualties and losses
Unknown	According to the Houthis: 500 Saudi-led troops killed 2,000 captured 15 military vehicles destroyed

From late August to late September 2019, a military operation was carried out by Yemeni forces loyal to the Houthi-led Supreme Political Council, under the code name "Victory from God". It targeted Saudi Arabia and allied forces along the Saudi Arabia–Yemen border.

At the operation's height in late September, the Houthi-led forces reportedly encircled and destroyed a substantial concentration of Saudi-led forces. The Houthi military spokesman Yahya Saree in a press conference, said that three Saudi-led brigades alongside KSA forces were besieged and defeated following a 72 hour battle south of Najran. Thousands of enemy forces were reported casualties with over 500 Saudi led forces killed and 2,500 captured and 15 vehicles burned out. According to the Houthi spokesman, the Saudi brigades were preparing for a major attack against the Houthis in retaliation to the attack on Abqaiq and Khurais oil facilities, however the Houthis were able to lure the Saudi troops into their trap. According to the Houthi military spokesman, Saudi warplanes then conducted airstrikes targeting the Saudi captives but the spokesman assured the families of the captives that they were able to hide and protect them from the coalition airstrikes. The Houthis have described the attack as "the largest operation since aggression started on our country (Yemen)".

== Background ==
Following the Houthi takeover in Yemen, a border conflict erupted along the Yemeni-Saudi border. Saudi-backed forces attempted to advance into the Houthis' core territories of northern Yemen, while pro-Houthi forces launched incursions into Saudi Arabia. Besides the general enmity between the Houthis and Saudi Arabia, the border conflict also takes place amid the still contentious issue where the border should be located in the first place. The southwestern Saudi Arabian province of Najran was traditionally part of Yemen until it was conquered by the former in 1934. Since then, many Yemenis continue to regard Najran as Yemeni territory.

In late 2019, Saudi-led forces under Brig. Gen. Musa Bin Dhaher Al-Balawi launched a major offensive into Saada Governorate, pushing backed the area's Houthi-led defenders. The pro-Saudi units included several Yemeni tribal militias, most importantly the al-Fatah Brigade. Facing relatively light resistance, the al-Fatah Brigade and some Saudi Arabian Army troops dispersed in northern Saada Governorate's canyons and mountains, most importantly Jabara Valley, leaving them vulnerable to counterattacks. Furthermore, the Saudi-led forces' supply situation remained problematic, as the Houthis held onto the strategically important location of Tanab.

== Operation ==
The Battle of the Jabara Valley, the first phase of Operation Victory from God.

Operation Victory from God began on 25 August 2019, as Houthi fighters and allied militias (Popular Committees) allegedly began to attack Saudi-led troops at about 300 points in the area between Najran and Jabara Valley. In late August, about 4,000 Houthi-led troops encircled and besieged a significant part of the al-Fatah Brigade in Jabara Valley. The Royal Saudi Air Force provided inadequate support, and the morale of the encircled troops plummeted due to a lack of food and water. A few hundred managed to break through the Houthi siege, but the rest eventually surrendered. One al-Fatah Brigade militiaman later accused the unit's commander, Major General Radad al-Hashemi, of gross incompetence during the battle. By 1 September, the remaining troops of the Al-Fateh Brigade still clashed with advancing Houthi forces at Kitaf in Saada Governorate.

On 28 September 2019, the Houthi military spokesperson Yahya Saree said that during an operation launched 72 hours prior near the border with the southwestern Saudi region of Najran, three "enemy military brigades had fallen" which was supported by the group's drone, missile and air defence units. The latter allegedly launched extensive missile and drone strikes against military targets in Saudi Arabia. According to the Houthis, "thousands" of Saudi troops, including many officers and soldiers of the Saudi army, as well as "hundreds of armoured vehicles" were captured. The spokesman said that the Yemeni fighters are capable of further penetrating into Saudi territories "in case it continues its aggression against Yemen". He assured the family of captives, "they will be kept in a secret place in order to keep them safe from any harm." The bodies of the killed troops, however, were simply dumped in the local mountains.

The Long War Journal, a United States-based news website, analysed the footage released by the Houthis. It concluded that the number of Saudi losses was probably grossly exaggerated, and that most of the shown prisoners of war did not belong to regular Saudi troops but to pro-Saudi Yemeni militias. However, some of the captured vehicles and surrendered soldiers belonged to the Saudi Arabian National Guard. Furthermore, the Long War Journal argued that the footage was probably compiled from several smaller clashes which had occurred from August to September, instead of indicating one massive battle. Regardless, the news website also regarded the footage as genuine, stating that "it is evident from the video and subsequent photos that hundreds of Saudi troops and allied tribal fighters have indeed been killed or captured in recent weeks." Pro-Saudi analyst Yaseen al-Tamimi argued that Operation Victory from God had probably taken place in late August at the Wadi Jabarah area of Kataf district, and concurred with the Long War Journal that most of the prisoners were troops loyal to the pro-Saudi Yemeni government. In contrast, the Saudi-led coalition spokesman denied all Houthi claims on 30 September, claiming that the alleged operation was "theatrical" and merely served as an attempt to mislead the media.

The attack came after three weeks from the Abqaiq–Khurais attack. After the Abqaiq and Khurais attack, the Houthi movement offered a peace initiative and a unilateral halt of all drones and missile attacks inside Saudi Arabia and said that they are waiting for Saudi Arabia to do the same. In the following days, reports from media stated that Saudi Arabia agreed on limited cases-fire. However, the Houthi leader rejected the limited cases-fire calling it insufficient move and that the movement would not agree except on "a comprehensive stop to the aggression and the lifting of the blockade".

== Aftermath ==
On 29 September, the head of the Houthi committee for prisoner-of-war affairs, Abdul Qader al-Murtada said that they were going to free 350 war prisoners. The following day, the Houthis unilaterally released 290 war prisoners including those who survived the Saudi-led coalition airstrike on a prison in Dhamar, Yemen which killed more than 100 war prisoners. Yahya Saree, a spokesman of the Houthi-controlled forces, said Saudi captured would be paraded on the group's TV network on Sunday.

Following the offensive, the country's foreign minister used his address to the United Nations General Assembly to focus blame on Iran. He said that "The solution rather lies in prompting these militias to implement the agreement and honoring the obligations they have assumed before the whole world".

Pro-Houthi media consequently reported that leading Saudi commanders in the Saudi-Yemeni border region stepped down or were dismissed due to the success of Operation Victory from God. According to Al-Alam TV, Al-Fateh Brigade commander Major General Radad al-Hashemi resigned from his position after the attack. However, al-Hashemi denounced these claims, arguing that his militia had not been defeated. The Northern Border Fronts and Yemeni Press Agency also reported that Brigadier General Musa Bin Dhaher Al-Balawi had been dismissed.

== See also ==
- Famine in Yemen (2016–present)
- Saudi Arabian-led intervention in Yemen
