= 270th Infantry Division (Wehrmacht) =

Nazi German infantry division

The 270th Infantry Division (German: 270. Infanterie-Division) was an infantry division of the German Heer during World War II.

There were two formations dubbed 270th Infantry Division. The first was a planned division scheduled for deployment in July 1940, but its deployment was interrupted. The division was eventually deployed in the second iteration in April 1942 and was posted on coastal defense duty in occupied Norway until the end of the war.

== History ==
=== Planned deployment in 1940 ===
Initially, an infantry division with the tentative designation 270. Infanterie-Division was scheduled for deployment following a directive of 22 May 1940 and planned to be fully operational by 1 July 1940. This formation's deployment was interrupted by the German victory in the Battle of France. The division was supposed to consist of the Infantry Regiments 565, 566, and 567, as well as Artillery Detachment 270 and the Division Units 270 (including Panzerjäger, pioneer, and intelligence companies). The division's regiments did not see action before the interruption of the division's deployment. Subsequently, the infantry recruits that were to make up the three regiments returned to their replacement battalions.

Later in the war, the regimental numbers that were initially intended for the regiments under the 270th Infantry Division were given out again:

- Grenadier Regiment 565 was formed on 15 January 1944 from parts of the 390th Field Training Division and 391st Field Training Division and served under the 131st Infantry Division and was renamed Grenadier Regiment 432 on 22 April 1944.
- Grenadier Regiment 566 was formed on 15 January 1944 from parts of the Grenadier Field Training Regiment 635 as well as parts of the 390th Field Training Division. It was dissolved and integrated as the first two battalions into the Grenadier Regiment 430 under the 129th Infantry Division.
- Grenadier Regiment 567 was formed on 15 January 1944 and completed deployment by 8 February 1944 from parts of the 391st Field Training Division, was attached to the 331st Infantry Division on 1 April 1944 and renamed Grenadier Regiment 557 upon the redeployment of the 331st Division in Normandy. The second battalion joined the 78th Infantry Division as Division Assault Battalion 78.

=== Deployment in 1942 ===
A second deployment of the 270th Infantry Division was undertaken in northern Norway on 21 April 1942 from the Coastal Defense Unit Tromsö, which had in turn been established on 10 February 1942 from Fortress Command Drontheim. The division's initial commander, appointed in April 1942, was Ralf Sodan.

The division was designated a fully autonomous formation on 9 May 1943, and consisted of the following elements:

- Grenadier Regiment 341, three battalions (taken from the 199th Infantry Division).
- Fortress Grenadier Regiment 856 with the Fortress Battalions 643, 648, and 660.
- Artillery Detachment 270 (formerly the third detachment of Artillery Regiment 199).
- Division Units 270 (consisting of a Panzerjäger Company and a Pioneer Company, each taken from the first battalion of the 199th Infantry Division, as well as a newly formed Intelligence Company).

On 17 August 1943, Hans Brabänder was appointed divisional commander, replacing Sodan.

In 1945, the Fortress Grenadier Regiment 856 was replaced with Jäger Regiment 501. The 856th Regiment instead joined the 199th Infantry Division.

The division remained in Norway throughout the war and did not see major combat until Germany was forced to surrender in May 1945.

== Superior formations ==
Organizational chart of the 270th Infantry Division, 1942–1945
Year	Month	Army Corps	Army	Army Group	Area
1942	May – December	LXXI	Armee Norwegen	None.	Northern Norway
1943	January – December	LXXI	Armee Norwegen	None.	Northern Norway
1944	January – October	LXXI	Armee Norwegen	None.	Northern Norway
1944	November – December	LXXI	20th Mountain Army	None.	Northern Norway
1945	January – April	Narvik	20th Mountain Army	None.	Northern Norway
