= Encirclement =

Wartime situation in which a force or target is surrounded by enemy forces

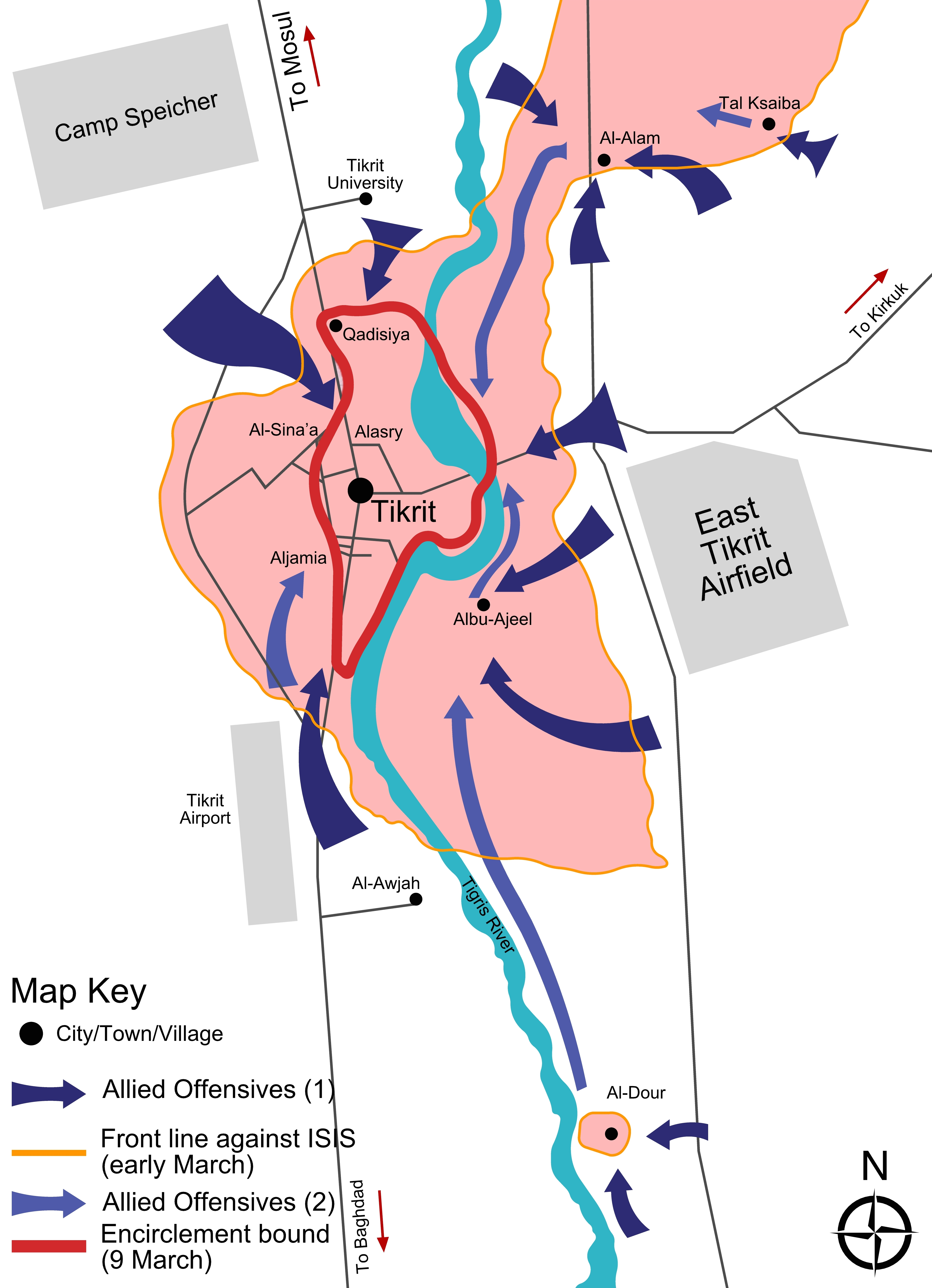
Diagram of the encirclement of ISIS forces in the Second Battle of Tikrit (2015). The blue arrows indicate allied attacks, while the red line is the line of encirclement as of 9 March 2015.

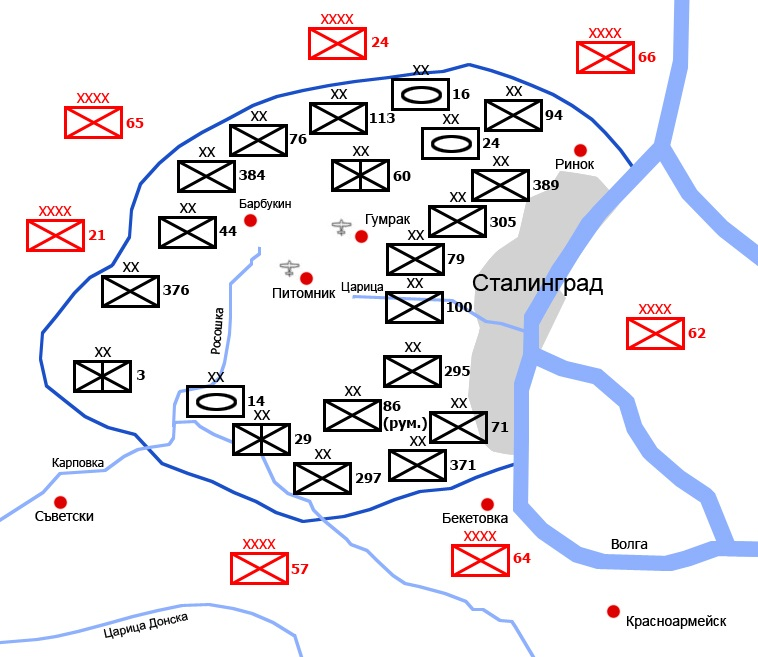
Encirclement of Stalingrad

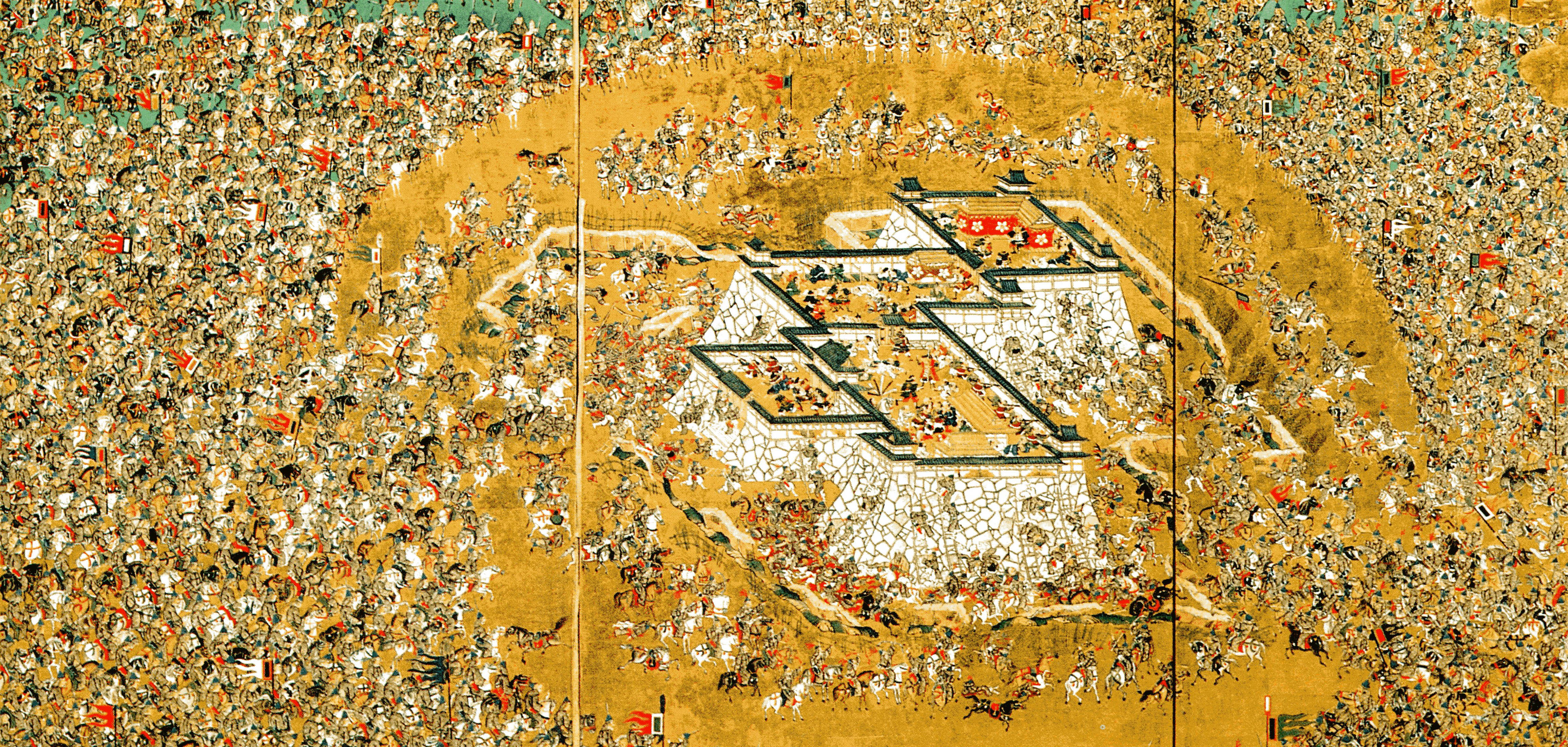
An encirclement during the Japanese invasions of Korea (1592–1598)

Encirclement is a military term for the situation when a force or target is isolated and surrounded by enemy forces. The situation is highly dangerous for the encircled force. At the strategic level, it cannot receive supplies or reinforcements, and on the tactical level, the units in the force can be subject to an attack from several sides. Lastly, since the force cannot retreat, unless it is relieved or can break out, it must fight to the death or surrender.

A special kind of encirclement is the siege. In that case, the encircled forces are enveloped in a fortified position in which long-lasting supplies and strong defences are in place, allowing them to withstand attacks. Sieges have taken place in almost all eras of warfare.

== History ==
Encirclement has been used throughout the centuries by military leaders, including generals such as Alexander the Great, Sun Tzu, Hannibal, Julius Caesar, Spartacus, Khalid bin Waleed, Genghis Khan, Yi Sun Shin, von Wallenstein, Nader Shah, Shaka Zulu, Napoleon, von Moltke, Heinz Guderian, von Rundstedt, von Manstein, Zhukov, Patton and Soleimani.

Sun Tzu and other military thinkers suggest that an army should be not completely encircled but instead given some room for escape. Otherwise, the "encircled" army's men will lift their morale and fight to the death. It is better to have them consider the possibility of a retreat. Once the enemy retreats, it can be pursued and captured or destroyed with far less risk to the pursuing forces than a fight to the death.

== Types of encirclement ==
The main form of encircling, the "double pincer", is executed by attacks on the flanks of a battle whose mobile forces of the era, such as light infantry, cavalry, tanks, or armoured personnel carriers attempt to force a breakthrough to utilize their speed to join behind the back of the enemy force and complete the "ring" while the main enemy force is stalled by probing attacks. The encirclement of the German Sixth Army in the Battle of Stalingrad in 1942 is a typical example. During the Winter War, Finland used "pocket tactics" against the Soviet Union, called motti; in the context of war, motti describes a tactic that the Finns used to immobilise, segment, surround and destroy the Soviet troops that were many times as large as them.

If there is a natural obstacle, such as ocean or mountains on one side of the battlefield, only one pincer is needed ("single pincer"), because the function of the second arm is taken over by the natural obstacle. The German attack into the lowlands of France in 1940 is a typical example of this.

A third and rare type of encirclement can ensue from a breakthrough in an area of the enemy front, and exploiting that with mobile forces, diverging in two or more directions behind the enemy line. Full encirclement rarely follows, but the threat of it severely hampers the defender's options. This type of attack pattern is centerpiece to blitzkrieg operations. Because of the extreme difficulty of this operation, it cannot be executed unless the offensive force has a vast superiority, either in technology, organization, or sheer numbers. The Barbarossa campaign of 1941 saw some examples.

The danger to the encircling force is that it is, itself, cut off from its logistical base; if the encircled force is able to stand firm, or maintain a supply route, the encircling force can be thrown into confusion (for example, Rommel's "Dash to the Wire" in 1941 and the Demyansk Pocket in 1942) or be comprehensively destroyed (as during the Burma campaign, in 1944).

== Notable encirclement battles ==
Some examples of battles of encirclement are listed below.

- Battle of Ai (1272 BC)
- Battle of Thermopylae (480 BC)
- Battle of Cannae (216 BC)
- Battle of the Abas (65 BC)
- Battle of Walaja (633 AD)
- Battle of Mohi (1241)
- Battle of Ekeren (1703)
- Battle of Fraustadt (1706)
- Battle of Kirkuk (1733)
- Battle of Kars (1745)
- Battle of Maymyo (1768)
- Ulm Campaign (1805)
- Battle of Ocaña (1809)
- Battle of Fort Sumter (1861)
- Battle of Isandlwana (1879)
- Battle of Tannenberg (1914)
- Battle of Lodz (1914)
- Second Battle of the Masurian Lakes (1915)
- Battle of Magdhaba (1916)
- Battle of Rafa (1916)
- First Battle of Gaza (1917)
- Battle of Beersheba (1917)
- Battle of Megiddo (1918)
- Battle of Suomussalmi (1939-1940)
- Battle of Kiev (1941)
- Battle of Smolensk (1941)
- Battle of Białystok–Minsk (1941)
- Battle for Velikiye Luki (1942)
- Battle of Hong Kong (1941)
- Battle of Stalingrad (1942-1943)
- Battle of the Korsun-Cherkassy Pocket (1944)
- Kamenets-Podolsky pocket (1944)
- Operation Bagration (1944)
- Battle of the Mons Pocket (1944)
- Siege of Bastogne, Belgium (1944)
- Battle of the Ruhr Pocket (1945)
- Battle of Berlin (1945)
- Six-Day War (1967)
- Battle of Khorramshahr (1980)
- Battle of Mogadishu (1993)
- Battle of Misrata (2011)
- Battle of Aleppo (2012–2016)
- Battle of Ilovaisk (2014)
- Second Battle of Tikrit (2015)
- Battle of Afrin (2018)
- Battle of the Jabara Valley (2019)
- Siege of Mariupol (2022)
- Velyka Novosilka offensive (2025)

== See also ==
- Blockade
- Encirclement Campaigns
- Maneuver warfare
- Lodgement
