= Alois Weber =

German Nazi general

- Born: 26 July 1903
- Died: 19 June 1976 (aged 72)
- Military career
- Allegiance: Nazi Germany
- Branch: Army (Wehrmacht)
- Rank: Generalmajor
- Commands: 78th Infantry Division; 362nd Infantry Division
- Conflicts: World War II
- Awards: Knight's Cross of the Iron Cross with Oak Leaves

Alois Weber (26 July 1903 – 19 June 1976) was a general in the Wehrmacht of Nazi Germany. He was a recipient of the Knight's Cross of the Iron Cross with Oak Leaves.

== Awards and decorations ==
- Iron Cross (1939) 2nd Class (28 September 1939) &1st Class (28 November 1939)
- Knight's Cross of the Iron Cross with Oak Leaves
  - Knight's Cross on 26 November 1941 as Major and commander of I./Infanterie-Regiment 19
  - 579th Oak Leaves on 10 September 1944 as Oberst and commander of Grenadier-Regiment 61

Military offices
Preceded by General der Infanterie Siegfried Rasp	Commander of 78th Grenadier Division; 23 September 1944 – 9 October 1944	Succeeded by Renamed 78th Volksgrenadier Division
Preceded by Previously 78th Grenadier Division	Commander of 78th Volksgrenadier Division; 9 October 1944 – 1 December 1944	Succeeded by Generalleutnant Harald von Hirschfeld
Preceded by Generalmajor Max Reinwald	Commander of 362nd Infantry Division; February 1945 – 8 May 1945	Succeeded by None
