= Battle of the Jabara Valley =

Battle in the Yemeni Civil War

- Part of Operation Victory from God
- Map of the battle Houthi forces Saudi-led forces
Date	26 – 29 August 2019 (3 days)
Location	Jabara Valley, Yemen
Result	Houthi victory

Belligerents
(Yemen) Houthi government: Houthi fighters	Saudi Arabia: al-Fateh Brigade

Commanders and leaders
Mohamed al-Atifi	Radad al-Hashemi (al-Fateh Brigade)

Strength
4,000	1,100–2,000

Casualties and losses
Unknown but less than 200	1,000–1,900 killed or captured, 100 escaped 200+ vehicles destroyed or captured

The Battle of the Jabara Valley occurred between 26 and 29 August 2019, during the Second Yemeni Civil War. It was part of Operation Victory from God, a major Houthi-led offensive along the Saudi Arabian-Yemeni border.

== The battle ==
A Saudi Arabian auxiliary force of around 1,100 men from the al-Fateh Brigade launched an offensive into the Jabara Valley in Yemen's Saada Governorate against Houthi forces. When the al-Fateh Brigade entered the valley, it was initially met with no resistance. A Houthi force then enveloped the Saudi-aligned force and besieged it for four days. Saudi air support was ineffective at breaking the envelopment, with sources reporting that the Saudis accidentally struck their own positions with airstrikes. On 29 August 2019, a small breakout occurred with about 100 men from the pro-Saudi force escaping. The remaining thousand pro-Saudi troops capitulated, with approximately 1,000 to 2,000 killed or captured. The battle was part of the initial phase of Operation Victory from God.

== Aftermath ==
Houthi sources reported that a Saudi airstrike killed several Yemeni prisoners of war captured during the battle.

The Houthis continued their offensive during September 2019.

=== Use of foreign weaponry by Saudis ===
NGOs from the EU have discovered Arms Exports to Saudi Arabia that had been used in Yemen, notably in the Jabara Valley.
