= Ponyri =

Ponyri (Russian: Поныри) is the name of several inhabited localities in Kursk Oblast, Russia.

Urban localities

- Ponyri, Ponyrovsky District, Kursk Oblast, a work settlement in Ponyrovsky District

Rural localities

- Ponyri, Fatezhsky District, Kursk Oblast, a khutor in Kolychevsky Selsoviet of Fatezhsky District
