= LXXIV Army Corps =

The LXXIV Army Corps (German: LXXIV. Armeekorps) was an army corps of the German Wehrmacht during World War II.

== History ==
The LXXIV Army Corps was formed on 26 July 1943 as a static army corps under the authority of Oberbefehlshaber West (Army Group D) in Hanover in Wehrkreis XI. It was subordinate to the 7th Army from July 1943 to June 1944 and subsequently joined, at times, the 5th Panzer Army and the 15th Army. The initial commander of the LXXIV Army Corps was Erich Straube.

On 16 December 1944, Straube was succeeded as corps commander by Carl Püchler.

The LXXIV Army Corps was trapped in the Ruhr Pocket at the end of the war.

== Structure ==
Organizational chart of the LXXIV (74th) Army Corps
Year	Date	Subordinate units	Army	Army Group	Operational area
1943	5 August	266th Infantry, 346th Infantry	7th Army	Army Group D	Brittany
1943	5 September	266th Infantry, 346th Infantry	7th Army	Army Group D	Brittany
1943	4 October	266th Infantry, 346th Infantry	7th Army	Army Group D	Brittany
1943	8 November	266th Infantry, 346th Infantry, 353rd Infantry	7th Army	Army Group D	Brittany
1943	3 December	266th Infantry, 346th Infantry, 353rd Infantry	7th Army	Army Group D	Brittany
1944	1 January	266th Infantry, 346th Infantry, 353rd Infantry	7th Army	Army Group D	Brittany
1944	12 February	266th Infantry, 353rd Infantry, 721st Regiment	7th Army	Army Group D	Brittany
1944	11 March	266th Infantry, 721st Regiment	7th Army	Army Group D	Brittany
1944	15 April	266th Infantry, 721st Regiment	7th Army	Army Group D	Brittany
1944	15 May	77th Infantry, 266th Infantry	7th Army	Army Group B	Brittany
1944	12 June	266th Infantry, 353rd Infantry	7th Army	Army Group B	Brittany
1944	17 July	266th Infantry	7th Army	Army Group B	Normandy
1944	31 August	271st Infantry, 331st Infantry, 344th Infantry	5th Panzer Army	Army Group B	Normandy
1944	16 September	347th Infantry, 526th Infantry, 3rd Parachute	7th Army	Army Group B	Northern Eifel / Aachen
1944	13 October	89th Infantry, 275th Infantry, 347th Infantry	7th Army	Army Group B	Northern Eifel / Aachen
1944	5 November	89th Infantry, 275th Infantry, 347th Infantry, 116th Panzer	7th Army	Army Group B	Northern Eifel / Aachen
1944	26 November	89th Infantry, 272nd Infantry, 275th Infantry, 277th Infantry, 344th Infantry	7th Army	Army Group B	Northern Eifel / Aachen
1944	31 December	85th Infantry, 272nd Infantry, 326th Infantry	15th Army	Army Group B	Northern Eifel / Aachen
1945	19 February	3rd Infantry, 85th Infantry, 272nd Infantry, 3rd Parachute	5th Panzer Army	Army Group B	Rur
1945	1 March	85th Infantry, 272nd Infantry, 3rd Parachute	5th Panzer Army	Army Group B	Rur
1945	12 April	3rd Infantry, 176th Infantry, 272nd Infantry, 338th Infantry, Panzer Lehr	15th Army	Army Group B	Ruhr Pocket

== Noteworthy individuals ==
- Erich Straube, corps commander of LXXIV Army Corps (1 August 1943 – 16 December 1944).
- Carl Püchler, corps commander of LXXIV Army Corps (16 December 1944 – April 1945).
