= Erich Straube =

German general in the Wehrmacht

- Born: 11 December 1887
- Died: 31 March 1971 (aged 83)
- Military career
- Allegiance: German Empire; Weimar Republic; Nazi Germany
- Branch: German Army
- Service years: 1907–1945
- Rank: General der Infanterie
- Commands: 268th Infantry Division; XIII Army Corps; LXXIV Army Corps; LXXXVI Army Corps; 1st Parachute Army
- Conflicts: World War I; World War II; Battle of France; Operation Barbarossa; Battle of Białystok–Minsk; Battle of Smolensk (1941); Yelnya Offensive; Battle of Moscow; Battle of the Caucasus; Operation Overlord; Battle of Hürtgen Forest; Operation Veritable
- Awards: Knight's Cross of the Iron Cross with Oak Leaves

Erich Straube (11 December 1887 – 31 March 1971) was a German general in the Wehrmacht during World War II who held several corps level commands. He was a recipient of the Knight's Cross of the Iron Cross with Oak Leaves of Nazi Germany.

In late August 1944 Straube took command of a provisional army made up of approximately 70,000 personnel. This force suffered heavy casualties during the Battle of the Mons Pocket, with approximately 3,500 Germans being killed and 25,000 taken prisoner. Straube escaped.

== Awards and decorations ==
- Iron Cross (1914) 2nd Class (11 September 1914) & 1st Class (5 May 1916)
- Honour Cross of the World War 1914/1918 in 1934
- Clasp to the Iron Cross (1939) 2nd Class (15 November 1939) & 1st Class (17 May 1940)
- Knight's Cross of the Iron Cross with Oak Leaves
  - Knight's Cross on 19 July 1940 as Generalmajor and commander of 268.Infanterie-Division
  - 609th Oak Leaves on 30 September 1944 as General der Infanterie and commander of LXXIV. Armeekorps

Military offices
Preceded by None	Commander of 268. Infanterie-Division; 1 September 1939 – 6 January 1942	Succeeded by Generalmajor Heinz Greiner
Preceded by Generalleutnant Otto-Ernst Ottenbacher	Commander of XIII. Armeekorps; 21 April 1942 – 20 February 1943	Succeeded by Generalleutnant Friedrich Siebert
Preceded by None	Commander of LXXIV. Armeekorps; 27 July 1943 – 16 December 1944	Succeeded by General der Infanterie Carl Püchler
Preceded by General der Infanterie Carl Püchler	Commander of LXXXVI. Armeekorps; 17 December 1944 – 28 April 1945	Succeeded by None
Preceded by Generaloberst Kurt Student	Commander of 1. Fallschirm-Armee; 28 April 1945 – 8 May 1945	Succeeded by None
