= Friedrich Blümke =

- Born: 18 February 1898; Rahnwerder
- Died: 4 September 1944 (aged 46); Odesa, Ukraine
- Military career
- Allegiance: German Empire (to 1918); Weimar Republic (to 1933); Nazi Germany
- Branch: Heer
- Service years: 1916–1944
- Rank: Generalmajor
- Commands: 257. Infanterie-Division
- Conflicts: World War I World War II: Annexation of the Sudetenland; Invasion of Poland; Battle of France; Operation Barbarossa; Battle of Brody (1941); Battle of Kiev (1941); Battle of Rostov (1941); Siege of Sevastopol (1941–1942); Battle of Smolensk (1943); Jassy–Kishinev Offensive (August 1944)
- Awards: Knight's Cross of the Iron Cross

Friedrich Blümke (18 February 1898 – 4 September 1944) was a highly decorated general in the Wehrmacht during World War II. He was also a recipient of the Knight's Cross of the Iron Cross. Friedrich Blümke was wounded in August 1944 and was captured by Soviet troops in September. He died on 4 September 1944 in a Soviet prisoner of war camp near Odesa.

== Awards and decorations ==
- Iron Cross (1914) 1st and 2nd classes
- Wound Badge (1914) – black
- Honour Cross of the World War 1914/1918
- Sudetenland Medal
- Iron Cross (1939)
  - 2nd Class (17 September 1939)
  - 1st Class (20 October 1939)
- Eastern Front Medal
- Crimea Shield
- Honour Roll Clasp of the Army (7 October 1943)
- Knight's Cross of the Iron Cross on 6 November 1943 as Oberst and commander of Grenadier-Regiment 347

== Notes ==
Military offices
Preceded by Generalleutnant Anton-Reichard Freiherr von Mauchenheim genannt Bechtolsheim	Commander of 257. Infanterie-Division; 2 July 1944 – August 1944	Succeeded by None
