= 210th Coastal Defense Division =

210th Infantry Division Coastal Defense Division
- 210. Infanterie-Division
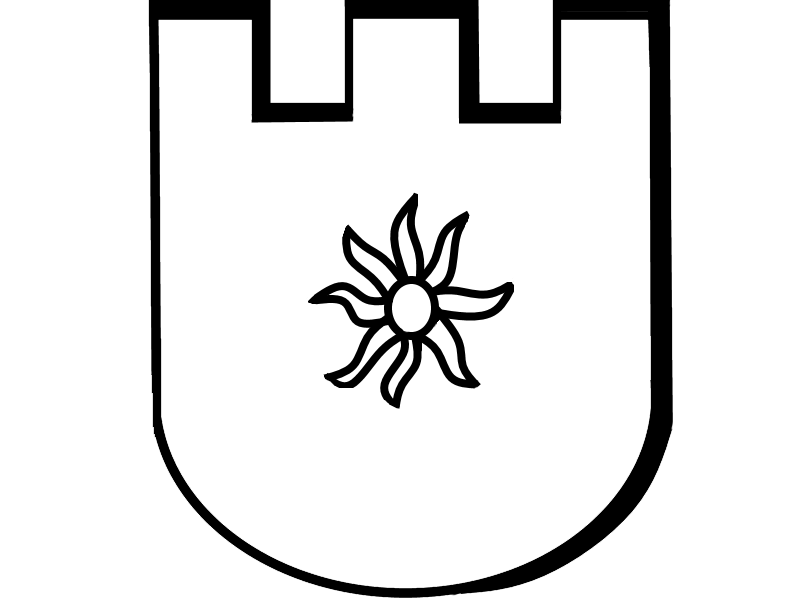
- 210. Infanterie Division (Küste-Abwehr-Infanterie-Division) Vehicle Insignia
- Active: July 1942 – May 1945
- Country: Nazi Germany
- Branch: Army
- Type: Infantry
- Size: Division
- Engagements: World War II

The 210th Coastal Defence Division was created from a Division zbV staff (an ad hoc headquarters that could be used to form a division around) in July 1942, and shipped north to defend the port Petsamo in Arctic Finland. In late 1944 it moved westward to take up the defense of Vardø in the Norwegian Finnmark.

The division had a non-standard organization, consisting of several battalions of fortress infantry and coastal artillery.

== Organization ==
The division had the following structure during its existence:

- Headquarters at Trondheim
  - 661st Fortress Battalion
  - 662nd Fortress Battalion
  - 663rd Fortress Battalion
  - 664th Fortress Battalion
  - 665th Fortress Battalion
  - 37th Army Coastal Defense Artillery Regiment
    - 448th Army Coastal Defense Artillery Battalion
    - 478th Army Coastal Defense Artillery Battalion
    - 480th Army Coastal Defense Artillery Battalion
    - 773rd Army Coastal Defense Artillery Battalion
  - 3rd Battalion, 67th Mountain Signal Battalion (Later became 210th Signal Company)
  - 210th Divisional Supply Group
  - (Later Added - 9th Motorcycle Battalion)

== Commanders ==
The division only had 2 commanders during its time :

- Generalleutnant Karl Wintergerst (15.07.1942 – 01.02.1944)
- Generalleutnant Kurt Ebeling (01.02.1944 – 08.05.1945)

== See also ==
- List of German divisions in World War II
