= Carl Püchler =

German general during World War II

- Born: 13 May 1894; Bad Warmbrunn, German Empire
- Died: 5 February 1949 (aged 54); Heilbronn, Allied-occupied Germany
- Military career
- Allegiance: Nazi Germany
- Branch: Army (Wehrmacht)
- Rank: General of the Infantry
- Commands: XXXIX. Panzer-Korps; LXVII. Armeekorps; LXXXVI. Armeekorps; LXXIV. Armeekorps
- Conflicts: World War I World War II
- Awards: Knight's Cross of the Iron Cross

Carl Püchler (13 May 1894 – 5 February 1949) was a German general during World War II. He was a recipient of the Knight's Cross of the Iron Cross of Nazi Germany.

== Awards and decorations ==
- Knight's Cross of the Iron Cross on 20 December 1941 as Oberst and commander of Infanterie-Regiment 228

Military offices
Preceded by Generalleutnant Karl Gümbel	Commander of 257. Infanterie-Division; 1 June 1942 – 5 November 1943	Succeeded by General der Artillerie Anton Reichard Freiherr von Mauchenheim-von Bechtoldsheim
Preceded by General der Artillerie Robert Martinek	Commander of XXXIX.Panzerkorps; 13 November 1943 – 18 April 1944	Succeeded by General der Artillerie Robert Martinek
Preceded by General der Infanterie Walther Fischer von Weikersthal	Commander of LXVII. Armeekorps; 24 July 1944 – 25 July 1944	Succeeded by General der Infanterie Otto Sponheimer
Preceded by Generalleutnant Friedrich-August Schack	Commander of LXVII. Armeekorps; 28 October 1944 – 30 November 1944	Succeeded by Generalleutnant Felix Schwalbe
Preceded by General der Infanterie Hans von Obstfelder	Commander of LXXXVI. Armeekorps; 30 November 1944 – 16 December 1944	Succeeded by General der Infanterie Erich Straube
Preceded by General der Infanterie Erich Straube	Commander of LXXIV. Armeekorps; 16 December 1944 – 16 April 1945	Succeeded by None
