= 230th Infantry (Coastal Defense) Division =

- 230. Infanterie-Division
- 230. Infanterie Division (Küste-Abwehr-Infanterie-Division) Vehicle Insignia
- Active: April 1942 – May 1945
- Country: Nazi Germany
- Branch: Army
- Type: 3rd Mobilization Wave Infantry Division (Infanterie-Division "Alter Art")

The 230th Infantry (Coastal Defense) Division (German: 230. Infanterie-Division or 230. Küste-Abwehr-Infanterie-Division) was created in April 1942 for the defense of Alta in the Norwegian Finnmark.

The division was a non-standard organization, consisting mostly of a collection of fortress infantry battalions.

== Organization ==
Structure of the division:

- Headquarters at Northern Norway
  - 349th Grenadier Regiment
  - 859th Fortress Grenadier Regiment
  - 930th Artillery Battalion
  - 930th Tank Destroyer Company
  - 930th Engineer Company (Later Battalion)
  - 930th Signal Company
  - 930th Divisional Supply Group

== Commanders ==
- Generalmajor Otto Schonheer
- Generalmajor Konrad Menkel
- Generalleutnant Albrecht Baier
- Generalmajor Benhard Pampel
