= 3rd Mountain Division =

- 3. Gebirgs-Division
- Active: 1 April 1938 – 8 May 1945
- Country: Nazi Germany
- Branch: German Army
- Type: Gebirgsjäger
- Role: Mountain warfare
- Size: Division
- Garrison/HQ: Graz
- Engagements: World War II: Odessa Offensive

Commanders
- Notable commanders: Generaloberst Eduard Dietl; General der Gebirgstruppen Julius Ringel; Generalleutnant Hans Kreysing; Generalleutnant August Wittmann; Generalleutnant Paul Klatt

The 3rd Mountain Division (German: 3. Gebirgs-Division) was a formation of the German Wehrmacht during World War II. It was created from the Austrian Army's 5th and 7th Divisions following the Anschluss in 1938.

== History ==
The division took part in the Invasion of Poland 1939 as part of Army Group South, but was transferred to garrison the West Wall before the end of the campaign. In 1940 it joined the invasion of Norway, most famously sending its 139th Mountain Regiment under General Eduard Dietl to seize the ice-free Arctic port of Narvik. The Allies briefly managed to take the town back, but abandoned it to the Germans after the invasion of France.

In 1941 the division moved into Lapland to participate in Operation Silberfuchs, the attack on the Soviet Arctic as part of Operation Barbarossa, but failed to capture Murmansk. The division was withdrawn to Germany for rehabilitation at the end of the year, but left its 139th Mountain Infantry Regiment behind to operate independently. After rehabilitation, the division returned to Norway in 1942, where it served as a reserve. It was then transferred to the Eastern Front, where it served as a reserve for Army Group North near Leningrad. In November 1942 it was committed to the front where the Soviets had surrounded Velikiye Luki, and then transferred in mid-December to the far south to help in the attempt to relieve Stalingrad. It fought the remainder of the war in the south, retreating with the front lines through Ukraine, Hungary, Slovakia, and finally surrendering to the Soviets in Silesia at the end of the war.

On 1 January 1945, the 3rd Mountain Division (then under Army Group Heinrici of Army Group A) had a strength of 9,805 men.

== Organization ==
Organization of the Division:

3rd Mountain Division 1939	3rd Mountain Division 1942	3rd Mountain Division (end 1944)
Gebirgs-Jäger-Regiment 138	Gebirgs-Jäger-Regiment 138	Gebirgs-Jäger-Regiment 138
Gebirgs-Jäger-Regiment 144	Gebirgs-Jäger-Regiment 144	Gebirgs-Jäger-Regiment 144
Gebirgs-Artillerie-Regiment 112	Gebirgs-Artillerie-Regiment 112	Gebirgs-Artillerie-Regiment 112
Aufklärungs-Abteilung 112	Radfahr-Abteilung 95	Aufklärungs-Abteilung 83
Panzerabwehr-Abteilung 48	Panzerjäger-Abteilung 95	Panzerjäger-Abteilung 95
Gebirsg-Pionier-Bataillon 83	Gebirgs-Pionier-Bataillon 83	Gebirgs-Pionier-Bataillon 83
Divisioneinheiten 68	Divisioneinheiten 68	Divisioneinheiten 68

== Commanders ==
- Generaloberst Eduard Dietl (1938 – 14 June 1940)
- General der Gebirgstruppe Julius Ringel (14 June 1940 – 23 October 1940)
- General der Gebirgstruppe Hans Kreysing (23 October 1940 – 10 August 1943)
- Generalleutnant Egbert Picker (10 August 1943 – 26 August 1943)
- General der Infanterie Siegfried Rasp (26 August 1943 – 10 September 1943)
- Generalleutnant Egbert Picker (10 September 1943 – 29 September 1943)
- Generalleutnant August Wittmann (29 September 1943 – 3 July 1944)
- Generalleutnant Paul Klatt (3 July 1944 – 8 May 1945)

== Footnotes ==
The Gebirgsjäger-Ersatz-Bataillon I./138 was responsible for ordering replacements for the staff.
