= 390th Division =

390th Division may refer to:

- 390th Field Training Division, Wehrmacht, Germany
- 390th Rifle Division, Soviet Union

== See also ==
- List of military divisions by number
- 390th (disambiguation)
