= Rovno–Lutsk offensive =

Rovno-Lutsk operation
- Part of Eastern Front (World War II)
| Date | 27 January– 11 February 1944 |
| Location | Polesia region, Rovno-Lutsk areas, Western Ukraine 50°37′N 26°15′E |
| Result | Soviet victory |

Belligerents
| Germany | Soviet Union |

Commanders and leaders
| (Nazi Germany) Erich von Manstein | (Soviet Union) Nikolai Vatutin |

Units involved
| (Nazi Germany) 4th Panzer Army: (Nazi Germany) XIII Army Corps; (Nazi Germany) LIX Army Corps; (Kingdom of Hungary (1920–1946)) VII Army Corps (in rear area for security duties) | (Soviet Union) 1st Ukrainian Front: (Soviet Union) 13th Army; (Soviet Union) 60th Army |

Strength
| Personnel strength on 1 February 1944: (Nazi Germany) XIII Army Corps: 45,379 personnel (Nazi Germany) LIX Army Corps: 21,898 personnel (Kingdom of Hungary (1920–1946)) VII Army Corps: 51,400 personnel AFV and AT guns status on 30 January 1944: (Nazi Germany) XIII Army Corps: 48 operational StuG's; 39 operational heavy AT guns; (Nazi Germany) LIX Army Corps: 13 operational tanks; 3 operational StuG's; 6 operational self-propelled AT guns; 29 operational heavy AT guns | On 27 January 1944: 174,000 personnel; 3,470 guns and mortars; 141 tanks and self-propelled guns |

The Rovno-Lutsk operation (Russian: Ровно-Луцкая операция), known on the German side as the Defensive battles in the Korosten - Rovno area and in the southern Pripyat region (German: Abwehrkämpfe im Raum Korosten - Rowno und im südlich Pripjet-Gebiet), was an offensive operation in the Western Ukraine, carried out by the far right-wing of the Red Army's 1st Ukrainian Front against the elements of the 4th Panzer Army of Army Group South, with the aim of enveloping the left wing of this army group. This operation was part of the greater Dnieper–Carpathian strategic offensive, carried out on the right-bank Ukraine.

The offensive, spearheaded by the 1st and 6th Guards Cavalry Corps in the wooded marshland, succeeded in capturing important communication centers of Rovno and Lutsk. As a result of this offensive, the Soviets deeply enveloped the left flank of Army Group South. This allowed the Red Army to strike southwards, deep in the rear of the Army Group South, which was accomplished a month later during the "Proskurov–Chernvotsy operation" that led to the encirclement of the 1st Panzer Army, in what is known as the Kamenets-Podolsky Pocket.

In addition, a new westward strategic direction emerged for the Red Army, with the possibility of striking in the Kovel-Lublin-Brest direction, which allowed the Red Army to come to the flank and the rear of Army Group Center. This offensive also created the so-called "Belorussian Balcony" – a German-occupied salient that protruded to the east and was over three hundred kilometers away from the front of Army Group South in the west.

This offensive was carried out around the same time that the Soviet Korsun–Schevchenkovsky offensive (also known as the Battle of the Korsun-Cherkassy Pocket). Although precious German armored divisions were being dispatched there to rescue two encircled German corps, the Soviet Rovno–Lutsk operation tied down the forces of the 4th Panzer Army that could otherwise be used in the relief operation of the Korsun-Cherkassy Pocket.

== The battle ==
Army Group South had instructed XIII Corps (Arthur Hauffe) to establish new defensive positions on the Sdolbuno-Uscie-Rovno-Zolotyov line to close the open left flank of the army group and delay the advancing Red Army. The Soviet advance was part of the Korsun–Shevchenkovsky offensive.

The Soviet 13th (Nikolai Pukhov) and 60th (Ivan Chernyakhovsky) Armies moved through gaps in the defensive line, surrounding the city. The remaining German forces capitulated on 5 February 1944.
