= Charles George Herbermann =

German-American professor and historian

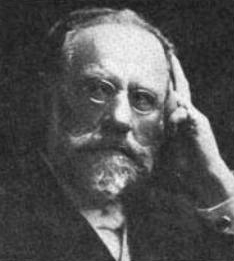
- Born: Karl Georg Herbermann; 8 December 1840; Saerbeck, Prussia
- Died: 24 August 1916 (aged 75); New York City, U.S.
- Burial place: Calvary Cemetery, New York City, U.S.
- Education: College of St. Francis Xavier
- Occupations: Educator, historian

The Catholic Encyclopedia; an international work of reference on the constitution, doctrine, discipline, and history of the Catholic Church

Charles George Herbermann (born Karl Georg Herbermann; 8 December 1840 – 24 August 1916) was a German-American professor and historian.

== Biography ==
Charles George Herbermann was born in Saerbeck near Münster, Westphalia, Prussia, on 8 December 1840, the son of George Herbermann and Elizabeth Stipp. He arrived in the United States in 1851, and seven years later graduated at College of St. Francis Xavier, New York City. He was appointed professor of Latin language and Literature (1869–1914) and librarian (1873–1914) at the College of the City of New York. For more than 50 years, he was immersed amidst various issues involved with Catholicism. He was president of the Catholic Club (1874–75) and of the United States Catholic Historical Society (1898–1913). He became editor in chief of the Catholic Encyclopedia in 1905. He translated Torfason's History of Vinland, and wrote Business Life in Ancient Rome (1880).

He died at his home in Manhattan on 24 August 1916, and was buried at Calvary Cemetery in Queens.
