= Hans Felber =

WW2 German army general (1889–1962)

Hans-Gustav Felber
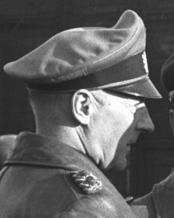
- Felber in 1943
- Born: 8 July 1889
- Died: 8 March 1962 (aged 72)
- Military career
- Allegiance: German Empire; Weimar Republic; Nazi Germany
- Branch: German Army
- Service years: 1908–1945
- Rank: General der Infanterie
- Commands: XIII Army Corps; LXXXIII Army Corps; Militärbefehlshaber Südost; 7th Army
- Conflicts: World War I World War II
- Awards: Knight's Cross of the Iron Cross

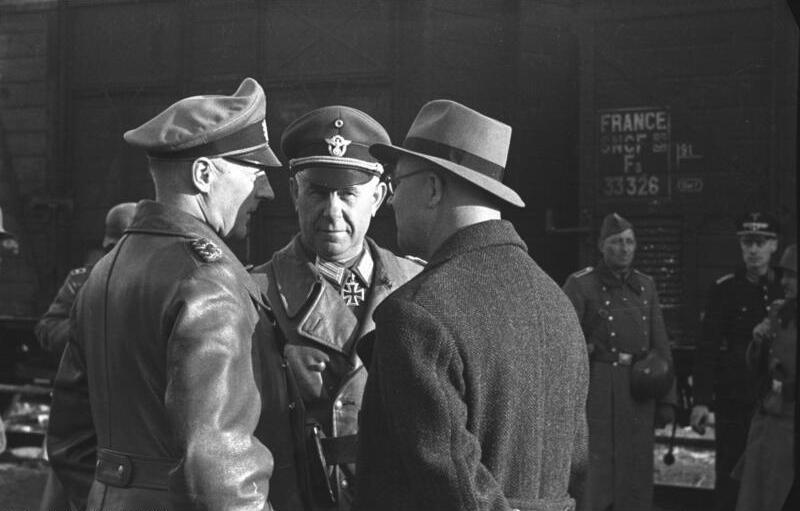
Hans Felber in front of Gare d'Arenc, Marseille, 1943

Hans-Gustav Felber (8 July 1889 – 8 March 1962) was a general in the Wehrmacht of Nazi Germany during World War II.

== Biography ==
From 15 October 1939 Felber was the chief of staff of the 2nd Army, becoming chief of staff of the Army Group Centre in February 1940. On 25 October 1940 he was given the command of the XIII Army Corps with which he fought in the Soviet Union. In April 1942, he was transferred to the Höheres Kommando z. b. V. XXXXV, later renumbered to LXXXIII Army Corps and Army Group Felber, stationed in France.

During August 1943, Felber was appointed Militärbefehlshaber Südost, under whose command were all German troops in Serbia, Albania, Montenegro, Croatia and Greece. German Foreign Ministry delegate for Balkans Hermann Neubacher and Felber considered that punitive measures against population (1:50) were no longer in interests of Germany, as they wanted better relations with Nedić's government, which August Meyszner, Higher SS and Police Leader for Serbia, opposed. Despite arguing for lesser punitive measures, under Felber Germans executed over 2,000 hostages in first two months of his rule, more than in the same period of previous year. On December 22 new lesser punitive measures were approved, and it was applied for entire Balkans, not just Serbia.

From 26 September to 27 October 1944 he headed the Army Group Serbia.

On 6 December 1944 he led the Corps Group Felber, which was renamed XIII Army Corps after the original XIII Corps had been disbanded following their crushing defeat in the Lvov–Sandomierz Offensive. From 22 February to 25 March 1945 Felber was the commander of the 7th Army.

== Awards ==
- Knight's Cross of the Iron Cross on 17 September 1941 as General der Infanterie and commander of XIII. Armee-Korps

Military offices
Preceded by Generaloberst Heinrich von Vietinghoff	Commander of XIII Army Corps; 25 October 1940 – 13 January 1942	Succeeded by Generalleutnant Otto-Ernst Ottenbacher
Preceded by None	Commander of LXXXIII Army Corps; 1 April 1942 – 14 August 1943	Succeeded by General der Infanterie Georg von Sodenstern
Preceded by General der Artillerie Paul Bader	Commander of Militärbefehlshaber Südost; 15 August 1943 – 28 September 1944	Succeeded by None
Preceded by General der Infanterie Arthur Hauffe	Commander of XIII Army Corps; 6 December 1944 – 12 February 1945	Succeeded by Generalleutnant Ralph Graf von Oriola
Preceded by General Erich Brandenberger	Commander of 7. Armee; 22 February 1945 – 25 March 1945	Succeeded by General Hans von Obstfelder
