= 46th Infantry Division (Wehrmacht) =

46th Infantry Division 46th Volksgrenadier Division
- 46. Infanterie-Division; 46. Volksgrenadier-Division
- Active: 24 November 1938 – May 1945
- Country: Nazi Germany
- Branch: Army
- Type: Infantry
- Size: Division
- Garrison/HQ: Karlsbad
- Engagements: World War II

The 46th Infantry Division (German: 46. Infanterie-Division) was an infantry division of the German Army during World War II that fought on the Eastern Front. Towards the end of the war, it became the 46th Volksgrenadier Division.

== History ==
The 46th Infantry Division was formed in 1938 under the command of General Paul von Hase. It fought in the invasion of Poland in 1939, where soldiers of the division were involved in the murder of approximately 300 Polish civilians during the Częstochowa massacre on 3 September.

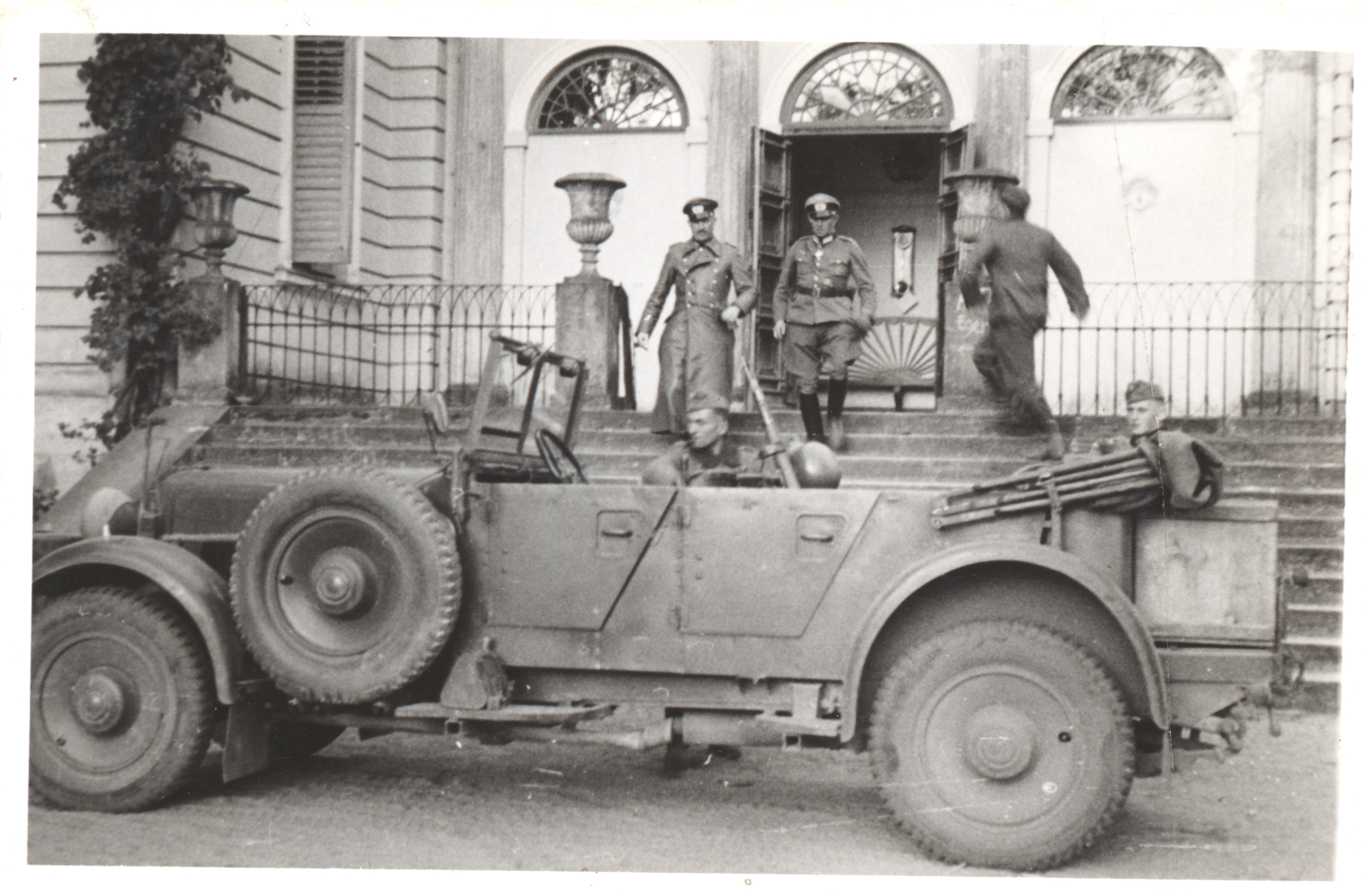
Paul von Hase (in long leather jacket), then commanding general of the 46th Infantry Division, during the Invasion of Poland

In 1940, the division participated in the Battle of France and remained there into 1941 before participating in the invasion of Yugoslavia in April. During the invasion of the Soviet Union, it was assigned to Army Group South and marched through Ukraine and into the Crimea.

In December 1941, the division was engaged in heavy fighting on the Kerch Peninsula. Despite being instructed to hold its ground, the XXXXII Army Corps commander, General von Sponeck, gave the order to pull back. This order was countermanded by the 11th Army commander, Erich von Manstein, but since von Sponeck had already disassembled his wireless set, the order to the position was not received. As a result, the division avoided encirclement and eventually helped stem the tide of the Red Army landings at Feodosiya. The withdrawal of the division infuriated the commander of Army Group South, Field Marshal Walther von Reichenau. Acting on Hitler's orders, Sponeck was dismissed from his position. The division's commander, General Kurt Himer, was also relieved of his command, and Reichenau further ordered that the division be stripped of its honors.

After the death of Reichenau two weeks later, his successor Fedor von Bock restored Himer to command and reinstated the division's honours. However, Himer was mortally wounded in March 1942 and was succeeded as commander by General Ernst Haccius. The division participated in the Siege of Sevastopol and fought in the Caucasus during the winter of 1942–43. As the tide of the war turned against the Germans, the division was forced to gradually retreat through Ukraine. By September 1943, its strength had been significantly reduced. By late 1944, after a fighting retreat through Transylvania and the Carpathian Mountains and engagement in the Slovak-Hungarian front, the division had effectively been reduced to regimental strength.

In March 1945, the division was designated a Volksgrenadier formation, and became the 46th Volksgrenadier Division. With its strength depleted, the division surrendered to the Soviets in May 1945.

== Commanding officers ==
- Generalleutnant Paul von Hase (24 September 1938 – 24 July 1940)
- Generalleutnant Karl Kriebel (24 July 1940 – 17 September 1941)
- Generalleutnant Kurt Himer (17 September 1941 – 26 March 1942)
- Generalmajor (Generalleutnant) Ernst Haccius (5 April 1942 – 7 February 1943)
- General Arthur Hauffe (7 February 1943 – 13 February 1943)
- General Karl von Le Suire (13 February 1943 – 27 February 1943)
- General Arthur Hauffe (27 February 1943 – 20 August 1943)
- General Kurt Röpke (20 August 1943 – 10 July 1944)
- Oberst Curt Ewrigmann (10 July 1944 – 26 August 1944)
- Generalleutnant Erich Reuter (26 August 1944 – 8 May 1945)
