= Hans Bergen =

German general (1890–1957)

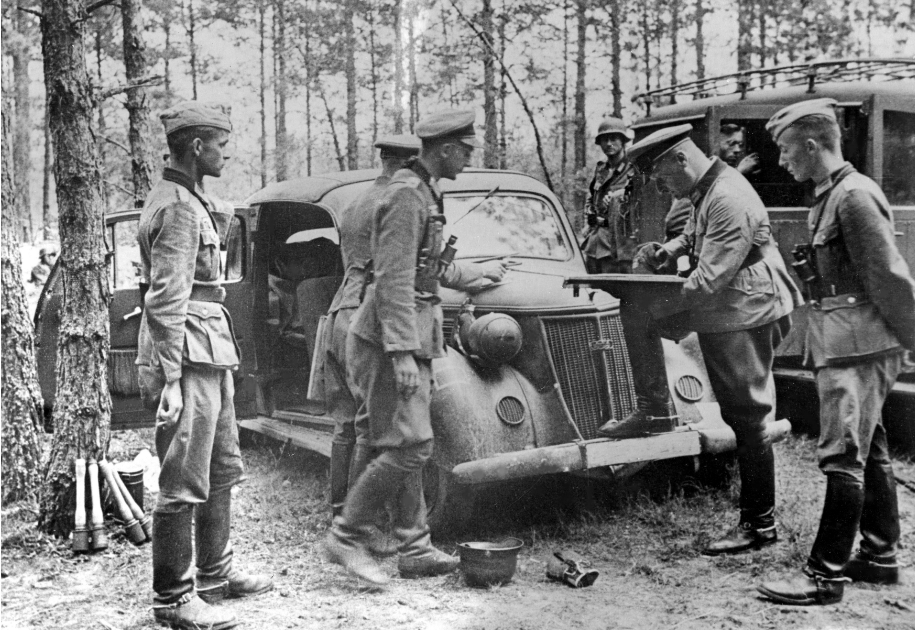
- Hans Bergen (with a map on his knee) gives orders to his officers on the Eastern Front (August 1941)
- Born: 5 March 1890
- Died: 17 February 1957 (aged 66)
- Military career
- Allegiance: Nazi Germany
- Branch: Army
- Rank: Generalleutnant
- Commands: 323. Infanterie-Division; 299. Infanterie-Division; 390th Security Division (Wehrmacht)
- Conflicts: World War II
- Awards: Knight's Cross of the Iron Cross

Hans Bergen (5 March 1890 – 17 February 1957) was a German general during World War II who commanded several divisions. He was a recipient of the Knight's Cross of the Iron Cross of Nazi Germany.

== Awards and decorations ==
- Knight's Cross of the Iron Cross on 9 July 1941 as Oberst and commander of Infanterie-Regiment 187

Military offices
Preceded by Generalleutnant Max Mühlmann	Commander of 323. Infanterie-Division; 10 January 1942 – 5 November 1942	Succeeded by Generalleutnant Viktor Koch
Preceded by Generalleutnant Viktor Koch	Commander of 299. Infanterie-Division; 5 November 1942 – 3 May 1943	Succeeded by Generalleutnant Ralph Graf von Oriola
Preceded by Generalleutnant August Wittmann	Commander of 390th Security Division; 3 May 1943 - 30 December 1944	Succeeded by Division disbanded
