= Erich Reuter =

Nazi general and Knight's Cross recipient (1904–1989)

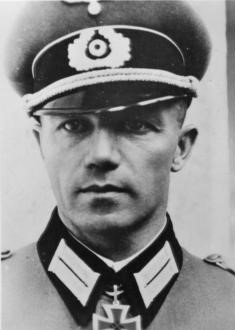
- Born: 30 March 1904; Hückeswagen, German Empire
- Died: 30 October 1989 (aged 85); Lindau, West Germany
- Military career
- Allegiance: Nazi Germany
- Branch: Army
- Rank: Generalleutnant
- Commands: 46th Infantry Division
- Conflicts: World War II
- Awards: Knight's Cross of the Iron Cross with Oak Leaves

Erich Reuter (30 March 1904 – 30 October 1989) was a German general in the Wehrmacht during World War II. He was a recipient of the Knight's Cross of the Iron Cross with Oak Leaves of Nazi Germany.

== Awards and decorations ==
- German Cross in Gold on 12 March 1942 as Major in Infanterie-Regiment 122
- Knight's Cross of the Iron Cross with Oak Leaves
  - Knight's Cross on 17 August 1942 as Oberstleutnant and commander of Infanterie-Regiment 122
  - 710th Oak Leaves on 21 January 1945 as Generalmajor and commander of 46. Infanterie-Division
