= Kalavryta massacre =

1943 razing of Kalavryta by Nazi troops during the Axis occupation of Greece

Coordinates: 38°2′N 22°7′E

- Part of the war crimes of the Wehrmacht during World War II
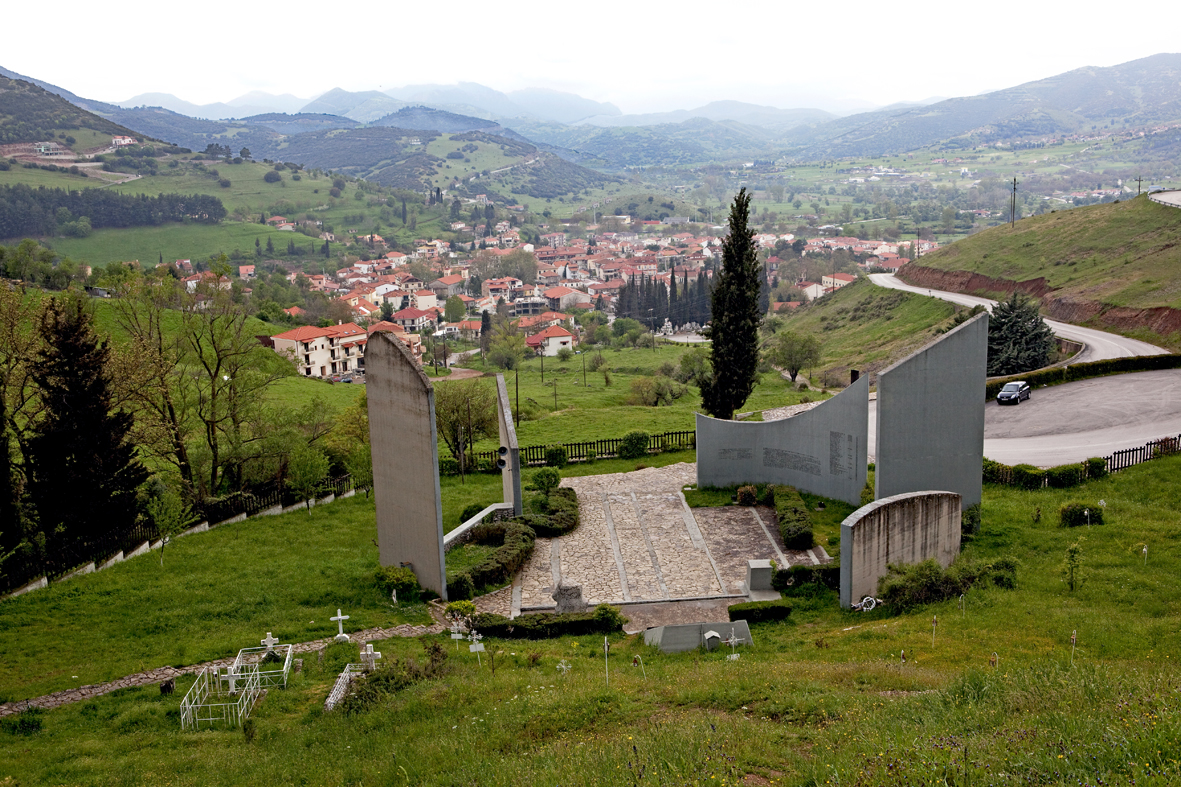
- The Massacre of Kalavryta Place of Sacrifice memorial with modern-day Kalavryta in the background
- Location: Kalavryta, Hellenic State
- Date: 13 December 1943
- Target: Greek men and boys
- Attack type: Mass murder by firing squads
- Weapons: Machine guns and rifles
- Deaths: 693
- Perpetrator: 117th Jäger Division: Karl von Le Suire

The Kalavryta massacre (Greek: Σφαγή των Καλαβρύτων), or the Holocaust of Kalavryta (Ολοκαύτωμα των Καλαβρύτων), was the near-extermination of the male population and the total destruction of the town of Kalavryta, Axis-occupied Greece, by the 117th Jäger Division (Wehrmacht) during World War II, on 13 December 1943.

== History ==
In early December 1943, the German Army's 117th Jäger Division began a mission named Unternehmen Kalavryta (Operation Kalavryta), intending to encircle Greek Resistance guerrilla fighters in the mountainous area surrounding Kalavryta. During the operation, 78 German soldiers, who had been taken prisoner by the guerrillas in October, were executed by their captors. In response, the commander of the German division, General Karl von Le Suire personally ordered the "severest measures" – the killing of the male population of Kalavryta – on 10 December 1943.

Operation Kalavryta was mounted from six cities: Patras, Aigion, and Corinth on the Gulf of Corinth and from Argos, Pyrgos and Tripolis in central Peloponnese. All "Battle-Groups" were aimed at Kalavryta, although the divisions from Pyrgos, Argos, and Corinth returned to their bases soon after. Wehrmacht troops burnt villages and monasteries and shot civilians on their way. The Germans reached Kalavryta on December 9. In the early morning of 13 December 1943, the Germans rounded up all residents of the town and forced them into the school building, where they separated the older boys and men from the women and children. They moved the men to a field owned by Thanasis Kappis, a school teacher, just overlooking the town. After looting the town and setting it ablaze, the Germans machine-gunned the men. 438 men, boys and seniors were killed. There were only 13 male survivors, saved because they were hidden under the bodies of the dead. Austrian soldiers were part of the contingent. The next call of order was to lock rounded up women and children into a primary school. After doing so the Germans set the school on fire. Luckily, the women and children found a way to escape the school, which was already on fire. The following day the German troops burned down the Agia Lavra monastery, a landmark of the Greek War of Independence.

During the reprisals of Operation Kalavryta 693 civilians were killed; their names are listed on memorials in Kalavrita and other villages. Twenty-eight communities – towns, villages, monasteries and settlements – were destroyed. In Kalavryta itself about 1,000 houses were looted and burned, and more than 2,000 livestock seized by the Germans.

Today the site of the massacre is kept as a memorial, and the events are commemorated every December. On 18 April 2000, the President of the Federal Republic of Germany, Johannes Rau, visited Kalavryta and expressed shame and sorrow for the tragedy.

== In art ==
- Requiem (1984) by Mikis Theodorakis is dedicated ”to the dead of the Massacre of Kalavryta”
- Kalavrita des mille Antigones by Charlotte Delbo

== In literature ==
Comprehensive historical accounts of Operation Kalavryta have been documented in two non-fiction books:

- Hermann Frank Meyer, whose father had been a German lieutenant captured and executed in Greece during WWII, wrote Von Wien nach Kalavrita: Die blutige Spur der 117. Jäger-Division durch Serbien und Griechenland (From Vienna to Kalavryta: The bloodstained trail of the 117th Jäger-Division through Serbia and Greece) in 2002.
- Antonis Kakoyannis, a local villager who interviewed over seventy eyewitnesses to the events, documented Operation Kalavryta from the perspective of his family and local Greeks in The Cursed Day: Eyewitness Accounts of the Nazi Massacres During Operation Kalavryta (2019).

Some survivors of the events have documented their stories in short publications in Greek which can be found in Kalavryta's museum and bookstore.

Other authors have woven narratives into the events surrounding the Kalavryta massacre, including Just Another Man: A Story of the Nazi Massacre of Kalavryta (1998) by Andy Varlow and Hitler's Orphan: Demetri of Kalavryta (2014) by Marc Zirogiannis. Hitler's Orphan is a historical novella that tells the story of the massacre from the perspective of the Zirogiannis family.

== See also ==
- List of massacres in Greece
- War crimes of the Wehrmacht
- Oradour-sur-Glane massacre
- Szczurowa massacre
- Distomo massacre
- Wehrmachtsausstellung
- The 200 of Kaisariani

== Sources ==
- Hermann Frank Meyer, Von Wien nach Kalavryta: Die blutige Spur der 117. Jäger-Division durch Serbien und Griechenland
- Andy Varlow, Just Another Man: A Story of the Nazi Massacre of Kalavryta. 1998; ISBN 1-883319-72-2
