= Werner von Eichstedt =

German general

Werner Bernhard Franz von Eichstedt
- Born: 1 January 1896; Saerbeck, Germany
- Died: 26 August 1944 (aged 48); Kishinev, Moldavian SSR, Soviet Union
- Military career
- Allegiance: German Empire; Weimar Republic; Nazi Germany
- Branch: Army
- Service years: 1914–44
- Rank: Generalmajor
- Commands: 294. Infanterie-Division
- Conflicts: World War II: Second Jassy–Kishinev Offensive †
- Awards: Knight's Cross of the Iron Cross

Werner Bernhard Franz von Eichstedt (1 January 1896 – 26 August 1944) was a German general (Generalmajor) in the Wehrmacht during World War II. He was a recipient of the Knight's Cross of the Iron Cross of Nazi Germany. Eichstedt was killed on 26 August 1944 near Kishinev, Moldova during the Soviet Second Jassy–Kishinev Offensive.

== Awards and decorations ==
- Knight's Cross of the Iron Cross on 16 November 1943 as Oberst and commander of Artillerie-Regiment 306

Military offices
Preceded by Generalmajor Hermann Frenking	Commander of 294. Infanterie-Division; 24 December 1943 - 26 August 1944	Succeeded by None
