= Otto-Ernst Ottenbacher =

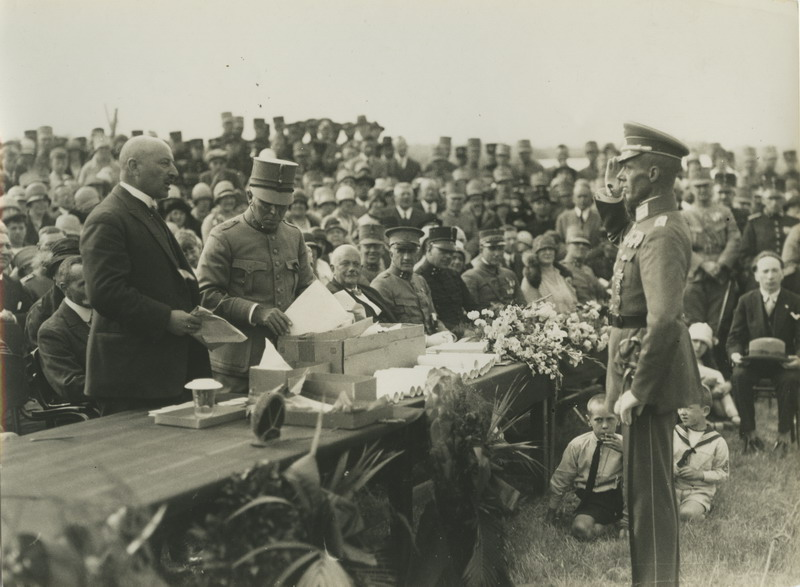
- Otto Ottenbacher (right) in 1928
- Born: 18 November 1888
- Died: 7 January 1975 (aged 86)
- Military career
- Allegiance: German Empire; Weimar Republic; Nazi Germany
- Branch: Army
- Rank: Generalleutnant
- Commands: 36. Infanterie-Division; XXXXI. Armeekorps; XIII. Armeekorps
- Conflicts: World War II
- Awards: Knight's Cross of the Iron Cross

Otto-Ernst Ottenbacher (18 November 1888 – 7 January 1975) was a German general in the Wehrmacht during World War II who commanded several corps. He was a recipient of the Knight's Cross of the Iron Cross. Ottenbacher was wounded during the opening stages of the Battle of Kalinin in October 1941, when his plane was shot down by Soviet fighters. Severely burned, he was invalided back to Germany to recuperate.

== Awards and decorations ==
- Knight's Cross of the Iron Cross on 13 August 1941 as Generalleutnant and commander of 36. Infanterie-Division

Military offices
Preceded by Generaloberst Georg Lindemann	Commander of 36. Infanterie-Division; 25 October 1940 – 15 October 1941	Succeeded by General der Infanterie Hans Gollnick
Preceded by General der Panzertruppe Georg-Hans Reinhardt	Commander of XXXXI. Armeekorps; 6 October 1941 – 13 October 1941	Succeeded by General der Panzertruppe Walter Model
Preceded by General der Infanterie Hans Felber	Commander of XIII. Armeekorps; 14 January 1942 – 21 April 1942	Succeeded by General der Infanterie Erich Straube
