= Max Bork =

German general (1899–1973)

Max Hermann Bork
- Born: 1 January 1899; Lasdehnen, East Prussia, German Empire
- Died: 4 July 1973 (aged 74); Hollern-Twielenfleth, Germany
- Military career
- Allegiance: German Empire; Weimar Republic; Nazi Germany
- Branch: Army
- Service years: 1916–1945
- Rank: Generalleutnant
- Commands: 47th Infantry Division; XIII Army Corps; Korps "Bork"
- Conflicts: World War I World War II: Annexation of Austria; Annexation of the Sudetenland; Annexation of the Memel Territory; Battle of France; Eastern Front; South German Offensive; Battle of Heilbronn (1945)

Max Hermann Bork (1 January 1899 – 4 July 1973) was a German general during World War II who commanded the XIII Army Corps. He may have been a recipient of the Knight's Cross of the Iron Cross of Nazi Germany.

Bork was born in Lasdehnen, East Prussia, he joined the German Army in 1916 and remained in the Weimar German Reichswehr. In World War II Bork commanded the 47th Infantry Division, the XIII Army Corps and the Korps "Bork". He received the German Cross in Gold on 16 August 1942 as Oberst im Generalstab of the LIII. Armeekorps

Towards the end of the war, Bork was nominated for Knight's Cross of the Iron Cross as commanding general of Korps "Bork". His nomination by the troop was received by the Heerespersonalamt (HPA—Army Staff Office) on 13 April 1945 via the Reichsführer-SS. Major Joachim Domaschk requested the explanatory statement from the Commander-in-Chief of AOK 1 via teleprinter message on 14 April 1945. He renewed his request on 5 May 1945. Domasck noted this in the book of "awarded Knight Crosses". In parallel the HPA received a second nomination by the troop, approved by all intermittent commanding officers, on 28 April 1945. This nomination apparently never made it to Major Domaschk. Both nominations by the troop fail to indicate further evidence that the nomination was processed or approved. The presentation date is an assumption of the Association of Knight's Cross Recipients (AKCR). Bork was a member of the AKCR.

He died in Hollern-Twielenfleth.

Military offices
Preceded by None	Commander of 47. Volksgrenadier-Division; 18 September 1944 - February 1945	Succeeded by Colonel von Grundherr
Preceded by Generalleutnant Ralph Graf von Oriola	Commander of XIII. Armeekorps; 31 March 1945 – 15 April 1945	Succeeded by General der Infanterie Walther Hahm
