= Ralph Graf von Oriola =

Ralph Graf von Oriola gugu
- Born: 9 August 1895
- Died: 28 April 1970 (aged 74)
- Military career
- Allegiance: Nazi Germany
- Branch: Army (Wehrmacht)
- Rank: Generalleutnant
- Commands: 72. Infanterie-Division; 299. Infanterie-Division; XIII. Armeekorps
- Conflicts: World War II
- Awards: Knight's Cross of the Iron Cross

Ralph Graf von Oriola (9 August 1895 – 28 April 1970) was a German general in the Wehrmacht during World War II who commanded the XIII. Armeekorps. He was a recipient of the Knight's Cross of the Iron Cross of Nazi Germany.

== Awards and decorations ==
- Knight's Cross of the Iron Cross on 23 December 1943 as Generalleutnant and commander of 299. Infanterie-Division

Military offices
Preceded by Generalleutnant Philipp Müller-Gebhard	Commander of 72. Infanterie-Division; 17 February 1943 - 3 May 1943	Succeeded by Generalleutnant Philipp Müller-Gebhard
Preceded by Generalleutnant Hans Bergen	Commander of 299. Infanterie-Division; 3 May 1943 - 15 January 1944	Succeeded by Generalleutnant Paul Reichelt
Preceded by Generalleutnant Paul Reichelt	Commander of 299. Infanterie-Division; 13 March 1944 - 28 June 1944	Succeeded by Generalleutnant Hans Junck
Preceded by General der Infanterie Hans Felber	Commander of XIII. Armeekorps; 12 February 1945 - 31 March 1945	Succeeded by Generalleutnant Max Bork
