= Karl von Le Suire =

German general

- Born: 8 November 1898; Unterwössen, Kingdom of Bavaria, German Empire
- Died: 18 June 1954 (aged 55); Stalingrad, RSFSR, Soviet Union
- Military career
- Allegiance: German Empire; Weimar Republic; Nazi Germany
- Branch: German Army
- Service years: 1916–1945
- Rank: General der Gebirgstruppe
- Commands: 46th Infantry Division; 117th Jäger Division; XXIV Panzer Corps; XXXXIX Mountain Corps
- Conflicts: World War I; World War II; Annexation of Austria; Occupation of Czechoslovakia; Invasion of Poland; Battle of France; Battle of the Caucasus; Massacre of Kalavryta; Battle of the Dukla Pass; Upper Silesian Offensive; Prague Offensive
- Awards: Knight's Cross of the Iron Cross

Karl Hans Maximilian von Le Suire (8 November 1898 – 18 June 1954) was a German general during World War II who commanded the XXXXIX Mountain Corps. He was responsible for the Massacre of Kalavryta, in Greece.

== Life and career ==
Karl von Le Suire was born on 8 November 1898 in Unterwössen in Upper Bavaria. After entering the German Army in December 1916, he was commissioned as a lieutenant in the Bavarian infantry and served on the Western Front. He continued in the army after 1918.

Von Le Suire held a number of staff appointments in the early part of World War II, including Chief of Staff of Gebirgs Corps Norway. He was then given command of the 99th Gebirgsjager Regiment. This was followed by command of the 46th Infantry Division in February 1943 and the Balkans-based 117th Jäger Division in May 1943.

In November 1943, while commanded by von Le Suire, the 117th Jäger Division began a mission named Unternehmen Kalavryta (Operation Kalavryta), intending to encircle Greek guerrilla fighters in the mountainous area surrounding Kalavryta. During the operations, some German soldiers were killed and 77 of them, who were taken prisoners, were executed by the Greek guerrillas. On 10 December 1943 von Le Suire signed the order for the German division to "level the locations Mazeika and Kalavryta". In total, more than 1,200 civilians were killed during the reprisal operations. About 1,000 houses were looted and burned and more than 2,000 sheep and other large domestic animals were seized by the Germans. The event is known as the Massacre of Kalavryta.

From August 1944 von Le Suire commanded the XXXXIX Mountain Corps, and was still in command when he surrendered to Soviet troops in May 1945. He died in Soviet captivity on 18 June 1954 in a prisoner of war camp at Stalingrad.

== Awards and decorations ==
- Iron Cross (1914) 2nd Class (28 March 1918) & 1st Class (19 December 1921)
- Clasp to the Iron Cross (1939) 2nd Class (13 September 1939) & 1st Class (13 September 1939)
- German Cross in Gold (25 April 1942)
- Knight's Cross of the Iron Cross on 26 November 1944 as General der Gebirgstruppe and commander of XXXXIX. Gebirgskorps

== See also ==
- War crimes of the Wehrmacht

Military offices
Preceded by General der Infanterie Arthur Hauffe	Commander of 46. Infanterie-Division; 13 February 1943 – 27 February 1943	Succeeded by General der Infanterie Arthur Hauffe
Preceded by Previously 717. Infanterie-Division	Commander of 117. Jäger Division; 1 May 1943 – 10 July 1944	Succeeded by Generalleutnant August Wittmann
Preceded by General der Artillerie Walter Hartmann	Commander of XXXXIX. Gebirgskorps; 5 August 1944 – 8 May 1945	Succeeded by None
