= Johannes Block =

German General during the Second World War, killed in Poland

- Born: 17 November 1894; Büschdorf, Province of Saxony, Kingdom of Prussia, German Empire
- Died: 26 January 1945 (aged 50) near Kielce, Poland
- Military career
- Allegiance: German Empire; Weimar Republic; Nazi Germany
- Branch: German Army
- Service years: 1914–1924; 1934–1945
- Rank: General der Infanterie
- Commands: 294th Infantry Division; VIII Army Corps; XIII Army Corps; LVI Panzer Corps
- Conflicts: World War I; World War II; Invasion of Poland; Battle of France; Operation Barbarossa; Battle of Kiev (1941); First Battle of Kharkov; Lower Dnieper Offensive; Lvov–Sandomierz Offensive; Vistula–Oder Offensive (KIA)
- Awards: Knight's Cross of the Iron Cross with Oak Leaves

Johannes Block (17 November 1894 – 26 January 1945) was a German general in the Wehrmacht during World War II who held commands at division and corps level. He was a recipient of the Knight's Cross of the Iron Cross with Oak Leaves. Block was killed on 26 January 1945 near Kielce, Poland during the Soviet Vistula-Oder Offensive.

== Early life and career ==
Johannes Friedrich Gustav Block was born on 17 November 1894 in Büschdorf, a village near Halle (Saale) (Note: Büschdorf was incorporated into Halle in 1950.) in the Prussian Province of Saxony as the son of Richard Block, a factory owner, and Bertha, née Beil. He was married on 23 May 1925 to Christel, née Neumann. He had one stepson from her previous marriage and the couple had one daughter.

At the beginning of the First World War, on 13 August 1914, Block joined the Prussian Army as a war volunteer (Kriegsfreiwilliger) in the Manfeld Field Artillery Regiment No. 75 ( Mansfelder Feldartillerie-Regiment Nr. 75). On 17 October 1914, he went into the field with the 1st Artillery Ammunition Column of the IV Army Corps. From there, on 15 February 1915, he was transferred to the Magdeburg Fusilier Regiment No. 36 (Füsilier-Regiment „General-Feldmarschall Graf Blumenthal“ (Magdeburgisches) Nr. 36).

Block was wounded in the right eye on 27 April 1915 during the trench warfare in Flanders. After spending almost two months in the hospital, he was assigned to the 1st Replacement Battalion of his regiment and then transferred as a Fahnenjunker (officer candidate) to the 2nd Replacement Battalion of the 1st Masurian Infantry Regiment No. 146 (1. Masurisches Infanterie-Regiment Nr. 146) in mid-July 1915.

From September to November 1915, Block attended a Fahnenjunker course in Döberitz. He was then transferred back to the regiment on the Eastern Front and was commissioned a Leutnant on May 11, 1916. In mid-November 1916, Block was declared unfit for service due to shell shock. He returned to the regiment's replacement battalion in March 1917, and was then transferred to the Reserve Infantry Regiment No. 208 on 16 May 1917. From 20 May 1917, Block served as the leader of an assault detachment (Sturmabteilung).

Block was wounded in the fighting at Verdun on 18 July 1917, and after his recovery, he returned to Infantry Regiment No. 146 on 6 November 1917, where he was assigned as the leader of a battalion mortar detachment. At this time, Infantry Regiment No. 146 had been deployed to the Middle East as part of the Asia Corps. There, Block saw action in Transjordan, Northern Palestine and Syria. On 1 June 1918, Block was commanded as the leader and instruction officer of a training course for Turkish troops in the Yildirim Army Group, but this assignment was cut short by illness (malaria) in mid-July 1918. After recovering, on 10 October 1918 he returned to the regiment as a battalion adjutant.

After the Armistice, Block was interned in Constantinople, returning to Germany at the end of January 1919. Block then served in a Freikorps formation before being retained in the Reichswehr, initially in Reichswehr-Schützen-Regiment 40 and then Infanterie-Regiment 120. On 1 October 1920, he was transferred to the 2. (Preußisches) Infanterie-Regiment. On 21 September 1923, Block was sent to an officer training course at the Infantry School in Munich. While there, he took part in the Beer Hall Putsch and as a consequence was discharged from the Reichswehr on 31 May 1924. (Note: Generally, the cadets who took part in the march on the Feldherrnhalle as part of the Putsch attempt were excused and remained in service, but the officers who led them were discharged from service.)

== Wehrmacht service ==
After the Nazis came to power, Block returned to the army on 1 July 1934 as a Hauptmann with a seniority date of 1 September 1931. He was promoted to Major on 1 March 1936. He was named commander of the 1st Battalion of Infanterie-Regiment 4 of the 32nd Infantry Division on 1 February 1937, with his seniority date as Major adjusted to 1 November 1935. Promotion to Oberstleutnant followed on 1 August 1938.

Block began World War II still in command of his battalion. On 14 March 1940, Block was named commander of Infanterie-Regiment 202 of the 75th Infantry Division, leading the regiment in the Battle of France in 1940 and in the invasion of the Soviet Union in 1941. He was promoted to Oberst on 1 August 1941. On 15 May 1942, he was tasked with the command of the 294th Infantry Division. Following promotion to Generalmajor on 1 September, he was formally named commander of the division. On 1 January 1943, he was promoted to Generalleutnant.

Block was awarded the Oakleaves to the Knight's Cross on 22 November 1943 in recognition for the actions of his troops in the defensive battles by Krivoy Rog. He was transferred to the Führerreserve (Leaders Reserve) in late December and attended a course for commanding generals from 5 to 25 January 1944.

On 1 April 1944, Block took temporary command of the VIII Army Corps and on 25 April the XIII Army Corps. On 5 June 1944, he took command of the LVI Panzer Corps. He was promoted to General der Infanterie on 1 July 1944 and named commanding general of the corps on 15 July. Block was killed in action near Kielce during the Soviet Vistula–Oder offensive.

== Awards and decorations ==
- Kingdom of Prussia:
  - Iron Cross 2nd Class (5 July 1916)
  - Iron Cross 1st Class (22 August 1918)
- Kingdom of Bulgaria: Military Order for Bravery, 4th Class, 2nd Grade (17 November 1916)
- Ottoman Empire: War Medal (8 May 1918)
- German Empire: Wound Badge in Black (1918)
- Nazi Germany:
  - Honour Cross of the World War 1914/1918 for Combatants (30 December 1934)
  - Blood Order (8 November 1935)
  - Wehrmacht Long Service Award, 4th to 3rd Class (2 October 1936)
  - 1939 Clasp to the Iron Cross 2nd Class (8 September 1939)
  - 1939 Clasp to the Iron Cross 1st Class (10 September 1939)
  - Eastern Front Medal (15 January 1943)
  - Knight's Cross of the Iron Cross with Oak Leaves
    - Knight's Cross on 22 December 1941 as Oberst and commander of 202nd Infantry Regiment
    - Oak Leaves on 22 November 1943 as Generalleutnant and commander of 294th Infantry Division

Military offices
Preceded by Generalleutnant Otto Gabcke	Commander of 294. Infanterie-Division; 22 March 1942 – 12 August 1943	Succeeded by Generalmajor Hermann Frenking
Preceded by General der Infanterie Gustav Höhne	Commander of VIII. Armeekorps; 1 April 1944 – 15 April 1944	Succeeded by Generalleutnant Hans Schlemmer
Preceded by General der Infanterie Arthur Hauffe	Commander of XIII. Armeekorps; 25 April 1944 – 5 June 1944	Succeeded by General der Infanterie Arthur Hauffe
Preceded by General der Infanterie Friedrich Hoßbach	Commander of LVI. Panzerkorps; 15 June 1944 – 26 January 1945	Succeeded by General der Kavallerie Rudolf Koch-Erpach
