= Karl Göbel =

- Born: 20 January 1900
- Died: 2 March 1945 (aged 45)
- Military career
- Allegiance: German Empire; Weimar Republic; Nazi Germany
- Branch: Army (Wehrmacht)
- Service years: 1918–1930; 1935–1945
- Rank: Generalmajor
- Commands: 299th Infantry Division
- Conflicts: World War I World War II: Battle of France; Invasion of Yugoslavia; Operation Barbarossa; Battle of Kiev (1941); First Battle of Kharkov; Battle of the Caucasus; Lower Dnieper Offensive; Operation Dragoon; Courland Pocket †
- Awards: Knight's Cross of the Iron Cross with Oak Leaves

Karl Göbel (20 January 1900 – 2 March 1945) was a general in the Wehrmacht of Nazi Germany during World War II. He was a recipient of the Knight's Cross of the Iron Cross with Oak Leaves. Göbel was wounded on 16 February 1945 in the Courland Pocket and died on 2 March 1945. He was posthumously promoted to Generalmajor.

== Awards and decorations ==
- Iron Cross (1939) 2nd Class (16 June 1940) & 1st Class (3 August 1941)
- Honour Roll Clasp of the Army (17 November 1944)
- German Cross in Gold on 24 May 1942 as Major in the III./Infanterie-Regiment 419
- Knight's Cross of the Iron Cross with Oak Leaves
  - Knight's Cross on 10 September 1942 as Major and commander of III./Infanterie-Regiment 420
  - Oak Leaves on 8 June 1943 as Oberstleutnant and commander of Grenadier-Regiment 420

Military offices
Preceded by Generalleutnant Hans Junck	Commander of 299. Infanterie-Division; 1 September 1944 – 16 February 1945	Succeeded by None
