= LXXXIII Army Corps =

Army corps of the German Wehrmacht during World War II

The LXXXIII Army Corps (German: LXXXIII. Armeekorps) was an army corps of the German Wehrmacht during World War II. It was formed in 1942 and existed until 1943. After its dissolution, the personnel of the LXXXIII Army Corps was used to form the staff of the new 19th Army.

== History ==
The LXXXIII Army Corps was formed on 25 May 1942 from the renamed Höheres Kommando z. b. V. XXXXV, which had in turn been formed on 8 March 1940 in Königsberg.

The initial commander of the LXXXIII Army Corps was Hans Felber. The corps, which was subordinate to Army Group D, was also known as Armeegruppe Felber after its commander. The corps personnel served as a liaison staff between the German Wehrmacht and the 4th Italian Army.

Although the LXXXIII Army Corps often did not command any divisions, it at times oversaw the 712th Infantry Division in June 1942, and the second iteration of the 376th Infantry Division between April and May 1943. In November 1942, members of the LXXXIII Army Corps participated in Case Anton, the effective German annexation of Vichy France.

On 26 August 1943, the LXXXIII Army Corps was dissolved and its personnel used to form the staff of the new 19th Army.

== Noteworthy individuals ==
- Hans Felber, corps commander of LXXXIII Army Corps (21 May 1942 – 15 August 1943).
- Georg von Sodenstern, corps commander of LXXXIII Army Corps (15 August 1943 – 26 August 1943). After dissolution: Commander of the 19th Army until 29 June 1944.
