= 294th Infantry Division =

- 294. Infanterie-Division
- Active: October 1939 - August 1944
- Country: Nazi Germany
- Branch: Army
- Type: Infantry
- Size: Division
- Engagements: World War II: Battle of France; Invasion of Yugoslavia; Odessa Offensive; Jassy–Kishinev Offensive

The 294th Infantry Division was a German infantry division in World War II that participated in the invasion of Yugoslavia. The 294th Infantry Division was amalgamated with the 513th Infantry Regiment to create the 513th Grenadier Regiment, on October 15, 1942. The division was destroyed by the end of August 1944 during the Soviet Jassy–Kishinev Offensive and its commander killed.

== Organization ==
Structure of the division:

- Headquarters
- 294th Reconnaissance Battalion
- 513th Infantry Regiment
- 514th Infantry Regiment
- 515th Infantry Regiment
- 294th Field Replacement Battalion
- 294th Engineer Battalion
- 294th Artillery Regiment
- 294th Tank Destroyer Battalion
- 294th Signal Battalion
- 294th Divisional Supply Group

== Commanding officers ==
- Generalleutnant Otto Gabcke, 13 February 1940 – 22 March 1942, killed in action
- General der Infanterie Johannes Block, 22 March 1942 – 12 August 1943
- Generalmajor Hermann Frenking, 12 August – 24 December 1943
- Generalmajor Werner von Eichstedt, 24 December 1943 – 26 August 1944 (KIA)
