= 390th Field Training Division =

German division in World War II

The 390th Field Training Division, renamed the 390th Security Division in 1944, was a German Army infantry division during World War II. The unit existed between 4 September 1942 and 30 December 1944.

== Division history ==
The Division was raised on 4 September 1942 as a field training division for Army Group Center in Russia. The core of the division came from military districts VI, IX and XI, and the division was then replenished in the field by Reich Labour Service (RAD) personnel.

On 15 February 1944, the Grenadier (field training) regiments were assigned to Grenadier regiments in the 9th Army.

On 19 July 1944, the staff formed the 390th Security Division. The division fought in Lithuania and Curland.
On 10 November 1944, the divisional staff was disbanded and used to set up the 79th Volksgrenadier Division.

== Commanders ==
- General der Artillerie Walter Hartmann (10 September 1942 - 1 February 1943)
- Generalleutnant August Wittmann (1 February - 3 May 1943)
- Generalleutnant Hans Bergen (3 May 1943 - 30 December 1944)

== Sources ==
- Lexikon der Wehrmacht 390th Security Division
- Lexikon der Wehrmacht 390th Field Training Division
