= Ernst Haccius =

- Born: 11 December 1893
- Died: 11 February 1945 (aged 51); Soviet Union
- Military career
- Allegiance: Nazi Germany
- Branch: Army
- Service years: 1914–1945
- Rank: Generalleutnant (posthumously)
- Commands: 46th Infantry Division
- Conflicts: World War II: Invasion of Poland; Battle of France; Operation Barbarossa; Siege of Sevastopol (1941-1942); Battle of Caucasus †
- Awards: Knight's Cross of the Iron Cross

Ernst Haccius (11 December 1893 – 11 February 1943) was a German officer in the Wehrmacht of Nazi Germany during World War II who commanded the 46th Infantry Division. He was a recipient of the Knight's Cross of the Iron Cross. Haccius was killed 11 February 1943 north of Krasnodar /Caucasus; he was posthumously promoted to the rank of Generalleutnant and awarded the Knight's Cross.

== Awards and decorations ==
- Knight's Cross of the Iron Cross on 2 April 1943 as Generalleutnant and commander of 46. Infanterie-Division

Military offices
Preceded by Generalleutnant Kurt Himer	Commander of 46. Infanterie-Division; 5 April 1942 – 7 February 1943	Succeeded by Generalleutnant Arthur Hauffe
