= Paul Reichelt =

German General (WW2 & Bundeswehr)

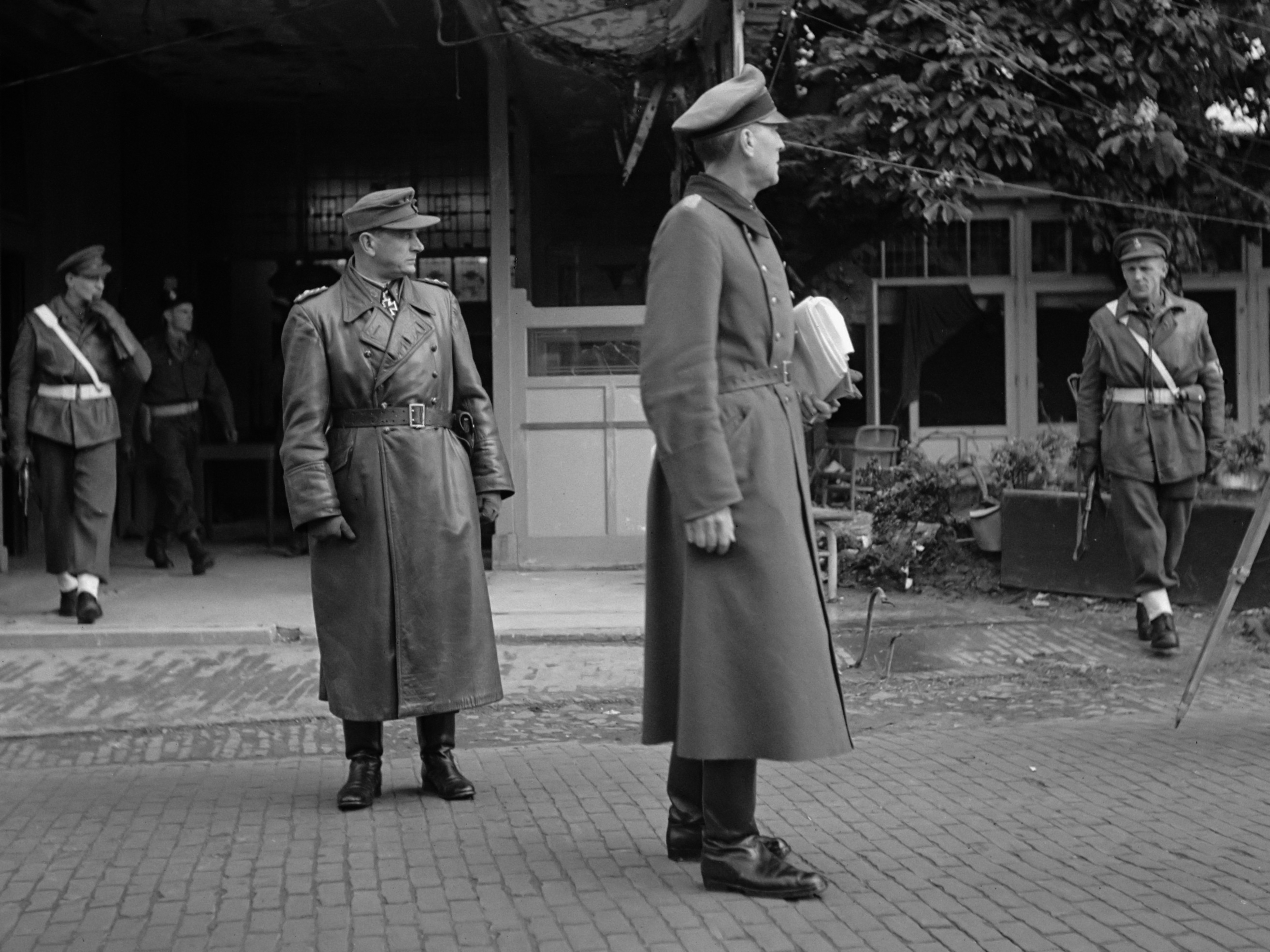
- Paul Reichelt (c.) at the surrender of the German forces in the Netherlands, 1945
- Born: 29 March 1898
- Died: 15 July 1981 (aged 83)
- Military career
- Allegiance: German Empire; Weimar Republic; Nazi Germany; West Germany
- Branch: Army (Wehrmacht); Bundeswehr
- Service years: 1915–1945; 1957–1962
- Rank: Generalleutnant
- Commands: 299th Infantry Division
- Conflicts: World War I World War II: Invasion of Poland; Battle of Belgium; Battle of France; Operation Barbarossa; Battle of Białystok–Minsk; Battle of Smolensk (1941); Battle of Moscow; Battle of Kursk; Battle of Smolensk (1943); Battle of Narva (1944); Baltic Offensive
- Awards: Knight's Cross of the Iron Cross

Paul Reichelt (29 March 1898 – 15 July 1981) was a highly decorated Generalleutnant in the Wehrmacht during World War II and in the Bundeswehr. He was a recipient of the Knight's Cross of the Iron Cross of Nazi Germany.

== Awards and decorations ==
- German Cross in Gold on 25 April 1942 as Oberstleutnant im Generalstab in General-Kommando IX. Armeekorps
- Knight's Cross of the Iron Cross on 8 October 1944 as Generalmajor and Chief of the general staff of Armee-Abteilung Narwa

Military offices
Preceded by Generalleutnant Ralph Graf von Oriola	Commander of 299. Infanterie-Division; 15 January 1944 – 13 March 1944	Succeeded by Generalleutnant Ralph Graf von Oriola
Preceded by Brigadegeneral Willi Mantey	Commander of 1st Panzer Division (Bundeswehr); 1 April 1957 – 31 March 1959	Succeeded by Generalmajor Burkhart Müller-Hillebrand
