= 117th Jäger Division =

German infantry division of World War II

717th Infantry Division 117th Jäger Division
- 717. Infanterie-Division; 117. Jäger-Division
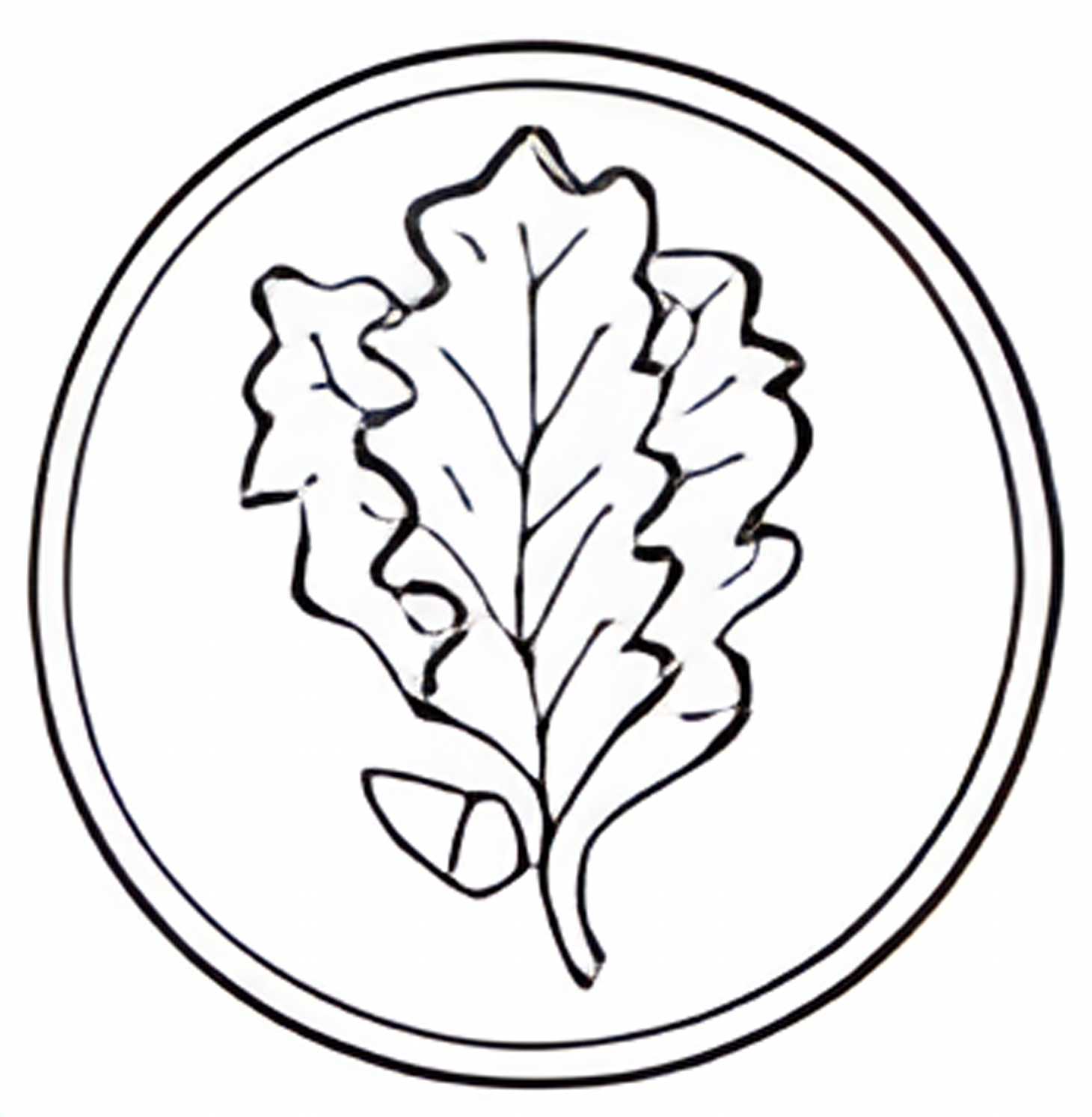
- Divisional insignia of the 117. Jäger-Division
- Active: 1941–1945
- Country: Nazi Germany
- Branch: Heer (Wehrmacht)
- Role: Occupation duties
- Size: Division
- Engagements: World War II: Yugoslavia; Siege of Kraljevo; Greece; Eastern Front

117th Jäger Division was a German infantry division of World War II. The division was formed in April 1943 by the reorganization and redesignation of the 717th Infantry Division. The 717th Division had been formed in April 1941. It was transferred to Yugoslavia in May 1941, to conduct anti-Četnik and anti partisan and Internal security operations.

It was then posted to Greece to guard the Peloponnesus until summer 1944, when it took part in the general withdrawal through the Balkans and suffered heavy losses during fighting with the partisans in September. The division ended the war fighting on the Eastern front and surrendered to the US Army in Austria in May 1945.

== Background ==
The main purpose of the German jäger divisions was to fight in adverse terrain where smaller, coordinated formations were more facilely combat capable than the brute force offered by the standard infantry divisions. The jäger divisions were more heavily equipped than mountain divisions, but not as well armed as a larger infantry formation. In the early stages of the war, they were the interface divisions fighting in rough terrain and foothills as well as urban areas, between the mountains and the plains. The jägers (it means hunters in German), relied on a high degree of training and slightly superior communications, as well as their not inconsiderable artillery support. In the middle stages of the war, as the standard infantry divisions were downsized, the Jäger structure of divisions with two infantry regiments, became the standard table of organization.

== Known war crimes ==
Men from the division took part in a war crime known as Massacre of Kalavryta in a revenge operation in the Kalavryta area in Greece following the capture and murder of 81 soldiers from the division by Greek ELAS partisans in October 1943. During following operations several villages were burned down and 677 civilians killed according to the most recent estimates.

The division was responsible for the Kraljevo massacre, the mass murder of approximately 2,000 residents of the central Serbian city of Kraljevo by the Wehrmacht between 15 and 20 October 1941, during World War II. The massacre came in reprisal for a joint Partisan–Chetnik attack on a German garrison during the Siege of Kraljevo in which 10 German soldiers were killed and 14 wounded. The number of hostages to be shot was calculated based on a ratio of 100 hostages executed for every German soldier killed and 50 hostages executed for every German soldier wounded, a formula devised by Adolf Hitler with the intent of suppressing anti-Nazi resistance in Eastern Europe.

The Wehrmacht initially responded by rounding up and executing 300 Serbian civilians, described in contemporary documents as "communists, nationalists, democrats and Jews." Over the following several days, all men between the ages of 14 and 60 were arrested and herded into a makeshift detention centre at the local rolling-stock factory. Once there, their papers were checked and their names entered into a ledger. When the camp was full, the Wehrmacht ordered groups of 100 prisoners to march to pre-dug mass graves, where they were executed with heavy machine guns. The bodies were then examined for any signs of life; victims that had survived the initial volley were dealt a single bullet to the head. Once the first group had been liquidated, the soldiers returned to the factory and collected the next 100 victims. This process continued until all the men that were rounded up had been killed. The reprisals lasted several days. Following the shooting of hostages from the rolling-stock factory, the Wehrmacht deployed through the surrounding villages, burning homes and killing indiscriminately. According to the 717th Infantry Division's own records, 1,736 men and 19 "communist" women from the city and its outskirts were executed, despite attempts by local collaborationists to mitigate the punishment. Twenty members of the 717th Infantry Division were later conferred Iron Crosses for their role in the killings.

== Area of operations ==
- Germany (May 1941)
- Serbia and Croatia (May 1941 – April 1943)
- Greece (May 1943 – September 1944)
- Balkans and Austria (September 1944 – May 1945)

== Commanders ==
- Generalmajor Paul Hoffmann (17 May 1941 – 1 November 1941)
- Generalleutnant Dr. Walter Hinghofer (1 November 1941 – 1 October 1942)
- Generalleutnant Benignus Dippold (1 October 1942 – 1 April 1943)
- General der Gebirgstruppe Karl von Le Suire (1 May 1943 – 10 July 1944)
- Generalleutnant August Wittmann (10 July 1944 – 10 March 1945)
- Generalmajor Hans Kreppel (10 March 1945 – 8 May 1945)

== Organisational history ==
The division was formed as the 717th Infantry Division on 11 April 1941 as an occupation division. The principal units of the division were as follows:

- 737th Infantry Regiment (I, II, III battalions)
- 749th Infantry Regiment (I, II, III battalions)
- 670th Artillery Battalion (1, 2, 3 batteries)
- 717th Pioneer Company
- 717th Signals Company
- 717th Divisional Service Units

On 1 April 1943, the 117th Jäger Division was formed by re-organising the 717th Infantry Division. The older men were replaced by younger men, and the principal units of the division were formed from those of its predecessor division, as follows:

- 737th Jäger Regiment (I, II, III battalions) - from the 737th Grenadier Regiment
- 749th Jäger Regiment (I, II, III battalions) - from the 749th Grenadier Regiment
- 670th Artillery Regiment (I, II, III battalions) - from the 670th Artillery Battalion
- 117th Pioneer Battalion
- 117th Signals Battalion
- 117th Divisional Service Units

In March 1945, II/737 was rebuilt using the 1010th Fortress Battalion, and the artillery regimental staff was restored using the 944th Army Coast Defence Artillery Regiment.
