= 47th Volksgrenadier Division =

- 47. Volksgrenadier Division Vehicle Insignia
- Active: 1944-1945
- Country: Nazi Germany
- Branch: Army
- Type: Volksgrenadier
- Size: Division
- Engagements: Second World War

The 47th Volksgrenadier Division (German: 47. Volksgrenadier-Division) was a volksgrenadier division of the German Army during the Second World War, active from 1944 to 1945.

== Operational history ==
The 577th Volksgrenadier Division (German: 577. Volksgrenadier-Division) was formed on 25 August 1944 as part of the 32nd Aufstellungswelle ("deployment wave"). The division began organising at Aarhus, in occupied Denmark with three volksgrenadier regiments, the 1189th, 1190th and 1191st, as well as the 1577th artillery regiment and other supporting units.

On 17 September, it was renumbered as the 47th Volksgrenadier Division, absorbing remnants of the 47th Infantry Division and renumbering its own regiments accordingly. The majority of its troops were transferred from the Luftwaffe and Kriegsmarine, with a sizable number of newly conscripted teenagers alongside a smaller proportion of combat veterans from the 47th Infantry. The division was commanded by Lieutenant General Max Bork.

In mid-November, the division was ordered just east of the village of Gressnich, now part of Stolberg in North Rhine-Westphalia. Field Marshal Model, believing the division to be inexperienced, moved them out of the way of the American Ninth Army.

It remained in action on the Western Front, until it was destroyed in March 1945. Between January and March 1945, the 47th Volksgrenadier Division became an example of the chaotic logistical breakdown suffered by German forces in the closing months of the war; ordered from the Düren area to the Rösrath-Overath-Bergisch Gladbach-Wahn sector for reinforcements on 5 January 1945, it was instead reactivated preemptively on 10 January to redeploy by rail to Germersheim and be placed at the disposal of Army Group G, only to again be redeployed – this time by motor vehicle – on 17/18 March, with the intended target being Alzey. On arrival at Alzey, divisional command found that the 47th Volksgrenadier Division had been reduced to a single battalion of 115th Grenadier Regiment as well as 1547th Panzerjäger Detachment, with the rest of the divisional units vanished without trace during transport as a result of logistical breakdown. Regardless of the resulting complete inoperability of the division, it was nonetheless ordered to beat back Western Allied forces advancing via Wörrstadt. As divisional command was unable to make contact with its own superior formation, LXXX Army Corps, for another two days until 20 March, it moved through the German countryside without orientation, resorting to ad hoc absorptions of remnant German forces from other formations that were then used to build a weak infantry defense.

On 19 March 1945, a connection was thus established with 189th Infantry Division, positioned on 47th Volksgrenadier Division's left. The right flank remained without cover however, and both divisions were unable to resist American armored formations on 20 March, when U.S. 11th Armored Division overran 189th Infantry Division and battered the 47th Volksgrenadiers. The division retreated in disarray to Worms, from where German defenders were already fleeing, and was pursued by American troops. Without direction from superior command, 47th Volksgrenadier Division unilaterally moved without orders into the remnants of the German bridgehead at Ludwigshafen, where the division's leftovers rallied at Dannstadt. At this point, most motor vehicles had been lost or abandoned, and the infantry had resulted to moving its remnant heavy equipment on hand carts. The division was strengthened by Kampfgruppe Hobe of 79th Volksgrenadier Division, which joined the division in an improvised fusion of forces to solidify the front towards the north. On 22 March, still beset by Allied air power and armored forces, the 47th Volksgrenadier Division reached Speyer and placed itself at the disposal of the city's local Kampfkommandant commander. The defenders of Speyer were absorbed by the division to fill the ranks of the infantry. Nonetheless, the city's defense was untenable, and the 47th Volksgrenadier Division crossed to the eastern bank of the Rhine on the night of 24/25 March 1945.

The division continued its improvised military actions in southern Germany, where it was eventually forced to surrender in the Alps. The division's commander Max Bork elevated his division's performance in postwar writings, thus participating in the self-mythologization of the beaten German armed forces in the postwar period.

== Commanders ==
- Lieutenant General Max Bork (18 Sep 1944 - Feb 1945)
- Colonel von Grundherr (Mar 1945 - Apr 1945)
- Colonel Langesee (Apr 1945)
- Major General Hauser (1945)

== Components ==
- 103rd Grenadier Regiment
- 104th Grenadier Regiment
- 115th Grenadier Regiment
- 147th Artillery Regiment
- 147th (Bicycle) Fusilier Company
- 147th Pioneer Battalion
- 147th Anti-tank Battalion (mot)
- 147th Signals Battalion
- 147th Field-replacement Battalion
