= XXXI Army Corps (Wehrmacht) =

The XXXI Army Corps (German: XXXI. Armeekorps) was a short lived army corps of Germany's Wehrmacht during World War II. It was active from 27 March 1945 to 8 May 1945.

== History ==
The XXXI Army Corps was formed on 15 September 1942 in North-Western Germany in the area of the River Ems. It was therefore also known as Korps Ems.

The 2nd Naval Infantry Division, 7th Parachute Division and the 15th Panzergrenadier Division were part of the Corps.
Its commander was General der Infanterie Siegfried Rasp.

== Source ==
- "XXXI. Armeekorps (31.) Korps Ems". Lexikon der Wehrmacht.
