= Saerbeck =

- Town
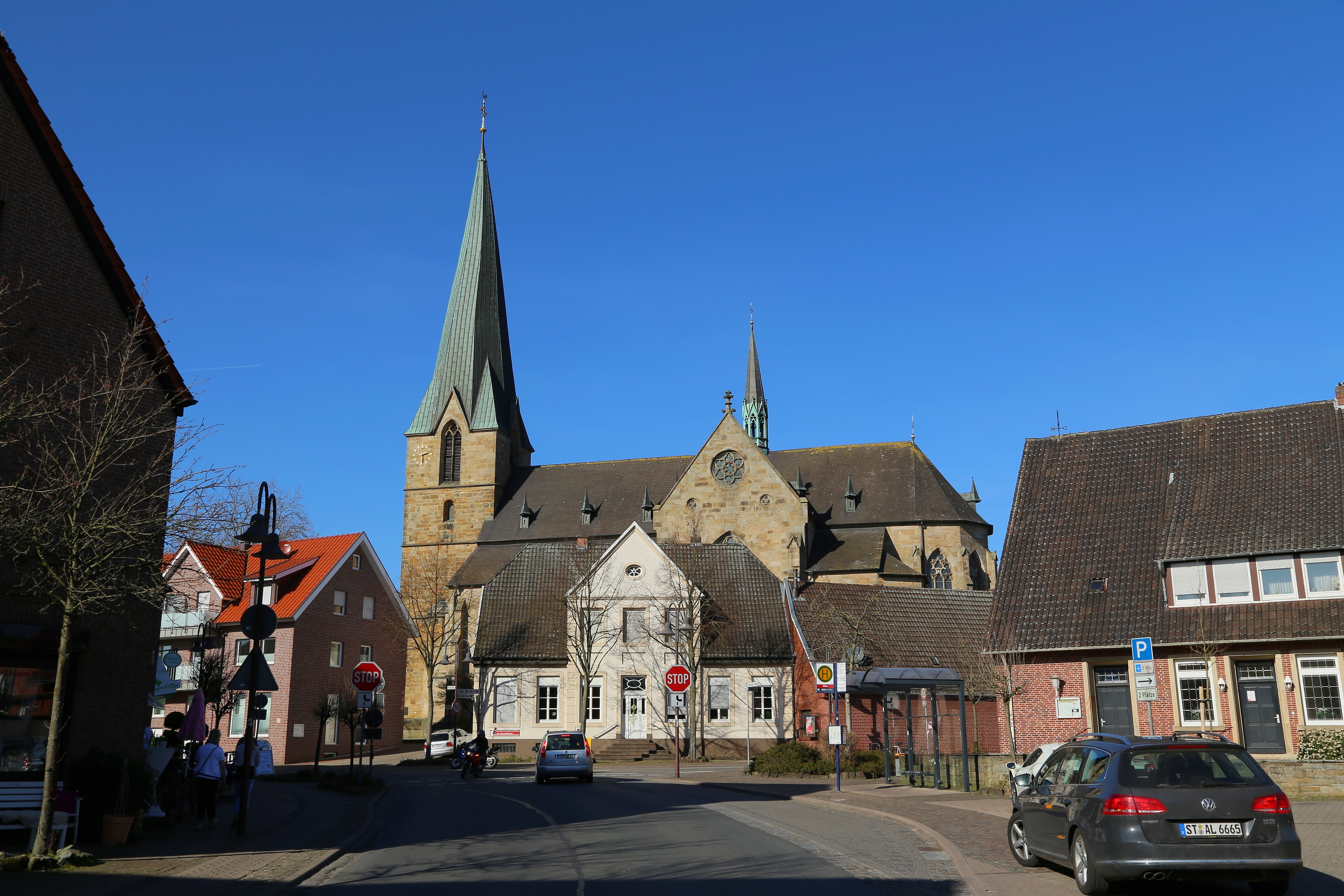

- Coat of arms

- Location of Saerbeck within Steinfurt district
- Interactive map of Saerbeck
- Location within Germany Location within North Rhine-Westphalia
- Coordinates: 52°10′30″N 7°38′00″E
- Country: Germany
- State: North Rhine-Westphalia
- Admin. region: Münster
- District: Steinfurt

Government
  - Mayor (2020–25): Tobias Lehberg

Area
  - Total: 59.03 km^{2} (22.79 sq mi)
- Elevation: 45 m (148 ft)

Population (2025-12-31)
  - Total: 6,906
  - Density: 117.0/km^{2} (303.0/sq mi)
- Time zone: UTC+01:00 (CET)
  - Summer (DST): UTC+02:00 (CEST)
- Postal codes: 48369
- Dialling codes: 02574
- Vehicle registration: ST
- Website: www.saerbeck.de

Saerbeck (German pronunciation: [ˈzaːɐ̯bɛk]) is a municipality in the district of Steinfurt, in North Rhine-Westphalia, Germany. It is situated approximately 30 km west of Osnabrück and 25 km north of Münster.

== Population ==
Historical population

Year	Pop.	±% p.a.
1965	2,844	—
1970	3,315	+3.11%
1975	4,026	+3.96%
1980	4,291	+1.28%
1985	4,677	+1.74%
1990	5,124	+1.84%
1995	5,633	+1.91%

Year	Pop.	±% p.a.
2000	6,382	+2.53%
2005	7,028	+1.95%
2010	7,302	+0.77%
2015	7,191	−0.31%
2020	7,088	−0.29%
2025	6,906	−0.52%

Source: Landesdatabank Nordrhein-Westfalen

== Twin cities ==
- Rietavas, Lithuania
- Ferrières-en-Gâtinais, France
- Commerce, Georgia, United States

== People ==
- Charles George Herbermann (1840-1916), American-German historian
- Werner von Eichstedt (1896-1944), German general
- Heinz Hoppe (1924-1993), German singer
