= 299th Infantry Division =

- Active: March 1940 – February 1945
- Country: Nazi Germany
- Branch: Heer (Wehrmacht)
- Type: Infantry
- Size: Division
- Engagements: Second World War: Battle of France; Eastern Front

The 299th Infantry Division (German: 299. Infanterie-Division) was a German Army infantry division in World War II. It fought France and the Russian Front until February 1945.

== Operational history ==
The 299th Infantry Division was formed in March and April 1940 from men from Hesse and Thuringia. The 299th Infantry Division first saw action in the 1940 campaign in France, staying in France until June 1941. From June 1941 the 299th Infantry Division then fought on the Eastern Front at the Southern and Central sectors of the front. The 299th Infantry Division gained distinction while fighting on the Eastern Front in the summer of 1943. In July 1944 the 299th Infantry Division was destroyed in fighting on the Eastern Front, reformed in September 1944. The 299th Infantry Division was sent back to the Eastern Front and destroyed in Eastern Prussia in February 1945.

== War Crimes ==
The 299th division participated in the Massacre at Babi Yar under Willi Moser.

== Commanding officers ==
- General of the Artillery Willi Moser (6 April 1940 – 1 November 1942)
- Lieutenant General Viktor Koch (1–5 November 1942)
- Lieutenant General Hans Bergen (5 November 1942 – 3 May 1943)
- Lieutenant General Ralph Graf von Oriola (3 May 1943 – 15 January 1944)
- Lieutenant General Paul Reichelt (15 January – 13 March 1944)
- Lieutenant General Ralph Graf von Oriola (13 March – 28 June 1944)
- Lieutenant General Hans Junck (28 June – 31 July 1944)
- Major General Karl Göbel (1 September 1944 – 16 February 1945)

== Division composition ==
- 528th, 529th, and 530th Infantry regiments
- 299th Artillery regiment
- 299th Engineering battalion
- 299th Anti-tank battalion
- 299th Reconnaissance battalion
- 299th Signals battalion
- 299th Kreigsgefangenen Bau Abt.

(Other support units all numbered 299th)
