= 323rd Infantry Division =

323rd Infantry Division (Wehrmacht)
- German: 323. Infanterie-Division
- Active: 1940–1943
- Country: Nazi Germany
- Branch: Infantry
- Size: Division
- Engagements: World War II

The 323rd Infantry Division (German: 323. Infanterie-Division) was an infantry division of the German Heer during World War II. It was formed in 1940, sent to the Eastern Front in 1942, and dissolved after heavy casualties in 1943. The remnants of the division were briefly grouped into the Division Group 323, which was eventually folded into the 88th Infantry Division in May 1944.

== History ==
=== 323rd Infantry Division ===
The 323rd Infantry Division was formed as a static division of the 13th Aufstellungswelle in Franconia in Wehrkreis XIII. Of its initial battalions, three were drawn from each the 62nd and the 73rd Infantry Divisions. The division's initial commander was Max Mühlmann.

Between May 1941 and April 1942, the 323rd Infantry Division served on occupation duty in northwestern France. On 13 January 1942, Hans Bergen took command of the division.

Following a decree on 7 February 1942, the division was restructured from a static division to an assault division to prepare it for service on the Eastern Front. The previously understaffed regiments of the division were brought to full strength in March 1942 through the addition of a 13th and 14th company to each of the infantry regiments and the addition of a heavy fourth detachment to the artillery regiment.

After heavy fighting on the Eastern Front that began with the division's arrival there in May 1942, the formation had been reduced to Kampfgruppe strength by February 1943. In January 1943, the 323rd Infantry Division fought alongside the other divisions of the VII German Corps and the IV Hungarian Corps, and elements of the division were assigned to aid the 75th Infantry Division's flank defense, along with elements of the 57th Infantry Division and the remnants of the 340th and 377th Infantry Divisions between 23 and 25 January. In February, the remnants of the division were attached to the 75th Infantry Division and the 26th Infantry Division, before the division was eventually officially dissolved on 2 November 1943, after which the remnants became the Division Group 323 (German: Divisionsgruppe 323).

The division's commander Bergen was replaced by Viktor Koch on 5 November 1942, by Andreas Nebauer on 25 December 1942, and by Ronald Koschella on 2 February 1943.

=== Division Group 323 ===
The Division Group 323 was formed on 2 November 1943 from the remnants of the 323rd Infantry Division and put under the supervision of the 88th Infantry Division under 4th Panzer Army. The division group's staff had been formed from Grenadier Regiment 594, previously part of the 323rd Infantry Division as well, and the division group was dissolved after the German breakout from the Korsun–Cherkassy Pocket. The remaining personnel was fully integrated into the 88th Infantry Division by May 1944.

== Organization ==
=== Superior formations ===
Superior formations of the 323rd Infantry Division of the German Wehrmacht, 1940–1943
Year	Month	Army Corps	Army	Army Group	Area
1940	December	In deployment.			Wehrkreis XIII
1941	January – April	In deployment.			Wehrkreis XIII
1941	May – December	Höheres Kommando z.b.V. LX	15th Army	Army Group D	English Channel coast
1942	January – March	Höheres Kommando z.b.V. LX	15th Army	Army Group D	English Channel coast
1942	April	XXXVII Army Corps	15th Army	Army Group D	English Channel coast
1942	May – July	OKH reserves.		Army Group South	Southern Russia
1942	August	Blümm	2nd Army	Army Group B	Voronezh
1942	September – December	VII Army Corps	2nd Army	Army Group B	Voronezh
1943	January – February	VII Army Corps	2nd Army	Army Group B	Kastornoye
1943	March – November	Remnants attached to the 75th Infantry Division and 26th Infantry Division.			
1943	November	Restructured into Division Group 323 and assigned to the 88th Infantry Division.			

=== Subordinate formations ===
The initial internal structure of the 323rd Infantry Division was as follows:

- Infantry Regiment 591 (three battalions). Drawn from one battalion each of the Infantry Regiment 199 and the Infantry Regiment 164, both previously part of the 62nd Infantry Division.
- Infantry Regiment 593 (three battalions). Drawn from one battalion each of the Infantry Regiment 213 and the Infantry Regiment 170, both previously of the 73rd Infantry Division.
- Infantry Regiment 594 (three battalions). Drawn from one battalion each of the Infantry Regiment 186, previously part of the 73rd Infantry Division, and the Infantry Regiment 183, previously part of the 62nd Infantry Division.
- Artillery Regiment 323 (three detachment). Drawn from one detachment each of the Artillery Regiment 162, previously part of the 62nd Infantry Division, and the Artillery Regiment 173, previously part of the 73rd Infantry Division, as well as four additional batteries.

== Noteworthy individuals ==
- Max Mühlmann, divisional commander of the 323rd Infantry Division (15 November 1940 – 12 January 1942).
- Hans Bergen, divisional commander of the 323rd Infantry Division (12 January 1942 – 5 November 1942).
- Viktor Koch, divisional commander of the 323rd Infantry Division (5 November 1942 – 25 December 1942).
- Andreas Nebauer, divisional commander of the 323rd Infantry Division (25 December 1942 – 2 February 1943).
- Ronald Koschella, divisional commander of the 323rd Infantry Division (2 February 1943 – 2 November 1943).
