= Catholic Club =

The Catholic Club in Bangalore is a social association established by Bangalore Catholic Archdiocese in 1948, although its membership is not limited to Catholics. The club-house is located on Museum Road next to St. Patrick's church. The Catholic Club is notable for its Christmas ball and New Year's ball.
