= Siegfried Rasp =

WW2 German Army general (1898-1968)

- Born: 10 January 1898; Munich, German Empire
- Died: 2 February 1968 (aged 70); Murnau am Staffelsee, West Germany
- Military career
- Allegiance: German Empire; Weimar Republic; Nazi Germany
- Branch: German Army
- Service years: 1915–1945
- Rank: General der Infanterie
- Commands: 19th Army; 335th Infantry Division
- Conflicts: World War I; World War II; Eastern Front; Operation Bagration; Western Front; Colmar Pocket
- Awards: Knight's Cross of the Iron Cross

Siegfried Rasp (10 January 1898 – 2 February 1968) was a general in the Wehrmacht of Nazi Germany during World War II.

== Awards and decorations ==
- Knight's Cross of the Iron Cross on 15 April 1944 as Generalmajor and commander of 335th Infantry Division

Military offices
Preceded by Generalleutnant Egbert Picker	Commander of 3rd Gebirgs Division; 26 August 1943 – 10 September 1943	Succeeded by Generalleutnant Egbert Picker
Preceded by Generalleutnant Heribert von Larisch	Commander of 78. Sturm Division; 15 February 1944 – 12 July 1944	Succeeded by Generalleutnant Hans Traut
Preceded by General der Infanterie Friedrich Wiese	Commander of 19th Army; December 1944 – February 1945	Succeeded by General der Infanterie Hermann Foertsch
Preceded by None	Commander of XXXI Army Corps; March 1945 – May 1945	Succeeded by None
