= 390th =

390th may refer to:

- 390th (King's Own) Light Anti-Aircraft Regiment, Royal Artillery, a Territorial Army (TA) battalion based at Ulverston in the Furness area of north Lancashire
- 390th Bombardment Squadron or 90th Expeditionary Air Refueling Squadron, provisional United States Air Force unit
- 390th Electronic Combat Squadron (390 ECS), part of the 366th Fighter Wing at Mountain Home Air Force Base, Idaho
- 390th Strategic Missile Wing, United States Air Force Strategic Air Command organization, stationed at Davis-Monthan Air Force Base, Arizona

== See also ==
- 390 (number)
- 390, the year 390 (CCCXC) of the Julian calendar
- 390 BC
