= Egbert Picker =

German General during WWII (1895–1960)

Egbert Martin Picker
- Born: 15 February 1895
- Died: 27 March 1960 (aged 65)
- Military career
- Allegiance: Nazi Germany
- Branch: Army (Wehrmacht)
- Rank: Generalleutnant
- Commands: 3rd Mountain Division
- Conflicts: World War II
- Awards: Knight's Cross of the Iron Cross

Egbert Martin Picker (15 February 1895 – 27 March 1960) was a general in the Wehrmacht during World War II who commanded several divisions. He was a recipient of the Knight's Cross of the Iron Cross.

== Awards and decorations ==
- Knight's Cross of the Iron Cross on 18 November 1941 as Oberst and commander of Gebirgsjäger-Regiment 98

Military offices
Preceded by General der Gebirgstruppe Hans Kreysing	Commander of 3. Gebirgs-Division; 10 August 1943 - 26 August 1943	Succeeded by General der Infanterie Siegfried Rasp
Preceded by General der Infanterie Siegfried Rasp	Commander of 3. Gebirgs-Division; 10 September 1943 - 29 September 1943	Succeeded by Generalleutnant August Wittmann
