= Arthur Hauffe =

German general and Knight's Cross recipient

- Born: 20 December 1892; Wittgensdorf, Kreishauptmannschaft Zwickau, Amtshauptmannschaft Chemnitz, Kingdom of Saxony, German Empire
- Died: 22 July 1944 (aged 51); Near Zolochiv east of Lviv, Galicia, Eastern Front
- Relatives: ∞ 1917 Elisabeth Auguste Jean Baumann (o¦o 1930) ∞ 1932 Ingeborg Maria Helene Hüger, stepdaughter of Ernst Busch; 4 children, including Bundeswehr Colonel Carl-Joachim Hauffe (1933–2010)
- Military career
- Allegiance: German Empire (to 1918); Weimar Republic (to 1933); Nazi Germany
- Branch: Prussian Army; Imperial German Army; Reichswehr; Heer
- Service years: 1912–1944
- Rank: Full General
- Commands: 46. Infanterie-Division; XIII. Armeekorps
- Conflicts: World War I World War II: Operation Barbarossa; Battle of Kiev (1943); Lvov–Sandomierz Offensive
- Awards: Iron Cross; German Cross in Gold; Knight's Cross of the Iron Cross

Ernst Fritz Arthur Hauffe (20 December 1892 – 22 July 1944) was a German general during World War II and commanded the XIII Army Corps. He was recipient of the Knight's Cross of the Iron Cross of Nazi Germany.

== Life ==
Arthur was the son of Reich railway official and stationmaster Friedrich Moritz Hauffe (1863–1932) and his wife (∞ 28 December 1885) Emma Alwine, née Schellbach (1862–1948). He had seven siblings.

After achieving his Abitur in Altenburg (Duchy of Saxe-Altenburg), Hauffe joined the 2nd Upper Alsatian Infantry Regiment No. 171 as an officer candidate on 25 April 1912 and was promoted to 2nd Lieutenant in December 1913. With the outbreak of the First World War, he and his regiment were sent to the front. From 24 June 1915, Hauffe served as battalion adjutant in the Replacement Infantry Regiment No. 29, the former Regiment "von Rath" under Leopold Richard Gustav Ludwig von Rath (1864–1939), now under Colonel Wilhelm Friedrich Alberti (1853–1933). There, he served as deputy regimental adjutant from 22 November 1915, and as regimental adjutant from 29 November 1915. In this position, he was promoted to 1st Lieutenant in January 1917. As such, he was transferred to the General Staff of the Commander-in-Chief East on 7 December 1917 where he was appointed orderly officer. From 1919 to 1935, he served in the Reichswehr, both in the infantry and cavalry. He also served in the Reichswehr Ministry (RWM) and received disguised general staff training (Führergehilfenausbildung) beginning on 1 December 1920.

=== Role in German defeats in northern Ukraine ===
Hauffe was General of Infantry during the Lvov–Sandomierz Offensive. The Lvov-Sandomierz Offensive was a major Red Army operation to force the German troops from Ukraine and Eastern Poland which was launched in mid-July 1944. During this military engagement, General Hauffe failed to prepare for the withdrawal of his troops when they were threatened by encirclement. He also failed to show up at headquarters during the final phase of the offensive from 20 July 1944 to 22 July 1944 thus forcing Lieutenant General Wolfgang Lange to assume command of the XIII Army Corps. His inaction led to the encirclement of his troops in the Brody pocket, where they were destroyed. He was captured by Soviet troops on 22 July 1944 and died later the same day when he stepped on a land mine.

== Promotions ==
- 25 April 1912 Fahnenjunker (Officer Candidate)
- August/September 1912 Fahnenjunker-Unteroffizier (Officer Candidate with Corporal/NCO/Junior Sergeant rank)
- 27 January 1913 Fähnrich (Officer Cadet)
- 18 December 1913 Leutnant (2nd Lieutenant) with Patent from 21 December 1911
- 27 January 1917 Oberleutnant (1st Lieutenant)
- 1 May 1924 Rittmeister
  - 1 October 1924 renamed Hauptmann (Captain)
  - 1 October 1925 renamed Rittmeister
  - 1 October 1926 renamed Hauptmann
- 1 October 1932 Major with Rank Seniority (RDA) from 1 April 1932
- 1 January 1935 Oberstleutnant (Lieutenant Colonel)
- 1 August 1937 Oberst (Colonel)
- 1 June 1941 Generalmajor (Major General) without RDA
  - 1 September 1941 received RDA
- 21 January 1943 Generalleutnant (Lieutenant General) with RDA from 1 January 1943
- 1 November 1943 General der Infanterie (General of the Infantry)

== Awards and decorations ==
- Iron Cross (1914), 2nd and 1st Class
- Hanseatic Cross of Hamburg
- Knight's Cross Second Class of the Order of the Zähringer Lion with Swords
- Knight's Cross Second Class with Swords of the Order of Albrecht
- Knight's Cross Second Class of the Ducal Saxe-Ernestine House Order with Swords
- Honour Cross of the World War 1914/1918 with Swords
- Wehrmacht Long Service Award, 4th to 1st Class
- Anschluss Medal
- Sudetenland Medal (presumably with the “Prague Castle” clasp)
- West Wall Medal
- Repetition Clasp 1939 to the Iron Cross 1914, 2nd and 1st Class
  - 2nd Class on 12 January 1940
  - 1st Class on 10 June 1940
- Order of Michael the Brave, 3rd Class on 14 October 1941
- Knight's Cross of the Iron Cross on 25 July 1943 as Generalleutnant and Commander of 46. Infanterie-Division
- German Cross in Gold on 11 April 1944 as General der Infanterie and Commanding General of the XIII. Armeekorps

Military offices
Preceded by Generalleutnant Ernst Haccius	Commander of 46. Infanterie-Division; 7 February 1943 – 13 February 1943	Succeeded by Oberst Karl von Le Suire
Preceded by Oberst Karl von Le Suire	Commander of 46. Infanterie-Division; 27 February 1943 – 20 August 1943	Succeeded by Generalmajor Kurt Röpke
Preceded by General der Infanterie Friedrich Siebert	Commander of XIII. Armeekorps; 7 September 1943 – 25 April 1944	Succeeded by Generalleutnant Johannes Block
Preceded by Generalleutnant Johannes Block	Commander of XIII. Armeekorps; 5 June 1944 – 22 July 1944	Succeeded by General der Infanterie Hans Felber
