= XIII Army Corps (Wehrmacht) =

- XIII. Armeekorps
- Active: 1 October 1937-March 1944; January 1945–May 1945
- Country: Nazi Germany
- Branch: Army
- Size: Corps
- Engagements: World War II: Annexation of the Sudetenland; Battle of France; Invasion of Poland; Operation Barbarossa; Battle of Białystok–Minsk; Battle of Kiev (1941); Battle of Moscow; Battle of Voronezh (1943); Battle of Kiev (1943); Lvov–Sandomierz Offensive; Western Allied invasion of Germany; Battle of Heilbronn (1945)

Commanders
- Notable commanders: Maximilian von Weichs; Hans Felber

XIII Army Corps (German: XIII. Armeekorps) was a corps of the German Army during World War II. Made up of several divisions, which varied from time to time, it was formed in Nuremberg on 1 October 1937.

Soon after the general mobilisation of August, 1939 the corps was engaged in the Polish campaign. Made up of the 10th, 17th, and 221st Infantry, it was part of the 8th Army. After the decisive German victory at the Battle of the Bzura, the Corps was transferred to the 16th Army in the Trier area of western Germany.

During the Invasion of France the following year the corps advanced to the River Meuse through Luxembourg in May, 1940. Reassigned to the 16th Army in the Champagne district they had reached Chalons-sur-Saône by the time of the Armistice. In July XIII Corps was moved to northern France to take a leading role in the planned, and then abandoned, Operation Sealion, the invasion of England. Instead they were moved to the Netherlands.

In May 1941 they were transferred to East Prussia to take part in Operation Barbarossa, the mass invasion of Soviet Russia. Comprising the 17th and the 78th Infantry Divisions, they formed a unit of the 4th Army in German Army Group Center. By July they had crossed the River Dnieper to Chernigov. In December, faced by Soviet counterattacks, they had to retreat back across the Ugra River. In April 1942 the Corps was transferred to the 4th Panzer Army. Sometime before August 1942, the Corps was transferred to the 2nd Army.

In January 1943 a Soviet counter-offensive pushed XIII Corps back to the Olym river. After the Soviet victory at the Battle of Kursk in July 1943 further retreat back to the River Dnieper was necessary. More Soviet attacks in December forced more retreat. In January 1944 they were pushed back to Galicia on the border of Poland and Ukraine. During the Lvov–Sandomierz Offensive in March 1944, the Corps was surrounded and crushed by the Soviet 4th Tank Army near Lviv in western Ukraine and subsequently dismantled by 5 August. Remnants of the Corps were absorbed into the Grossdeutschland Panzer Corps.

In January 1945 a newly formed XIII Corps was created from the Vosges Commando and stationed on the Western Front as part of 2nd Panzer Division. An Allied attack in April pushed the Corps back to Günzburg and, no longer operational, it retreated to the northern Alps.

== Commanders ==
- Cavalry General (General der Kavallerie) Maximilian von Weichs, 12 October 1937 – 26 October 1939
- Colonel-general (Generaloberst) Heinrich von Vietinghoff-Scheel, 26 October 1939 – 25 October 1940
- Infantry General (General der Infanterie) Hans-Gustav Felber, 25 October 1940 – 13 January 1942
- Lieutenant-general (Generalleutnant) Otto-Ernst Ottenbacher, 14 Januar – 21 April 1942
- Infantry General (General der Infanterie) Erich Straube, 21 April 1942 – 20 February 1943
- Infantry General (General der Infanterie) Friedrich Siebert, 20 February – 7 September 1943
- Infantry General (General der Infanterie) Arthur Hauffe, 7 September 1943 – 25 April 1944
- Lieutenant-general (Generalleutnant) Johannes Block, 25 April – 5 June 1944
- Infantry General (General der Infanterie) Arthur Hauffe, 5 June – 22 July 1944

After reformation

- Infantry General (General der Infanterie) Hans-Gustav Felber, 8 January – 11 February 1945
- Lieutenant-general (Generalleutnant) Ralph Graf von Oriola, 12 February – 31 March 1945
- Lieutenant-general (Generalleutnant) Max Bork, 31 March 1945 – 15 April 1945
- Infantry General (General der Infanterie) Walther Hahm, 15 – 20 April 1945
- Lieutenant-general (Generalleutnant) Theodor Tolsdorff, 22/24 April – 8 May 1945

== Area of Operation ==
- Poland : September 1939 - May 1940
- France : May 1940 - June 1941
- Eastern Front southern sector : June 1941 - July 1944
- Western Front : January 1945 - April 1945
