= Lvov–Sandomierz offensive =

Major Red Army operation

Lvov-Sandomierz strategic offensive operation
- Part of the Eastern Front of World War II
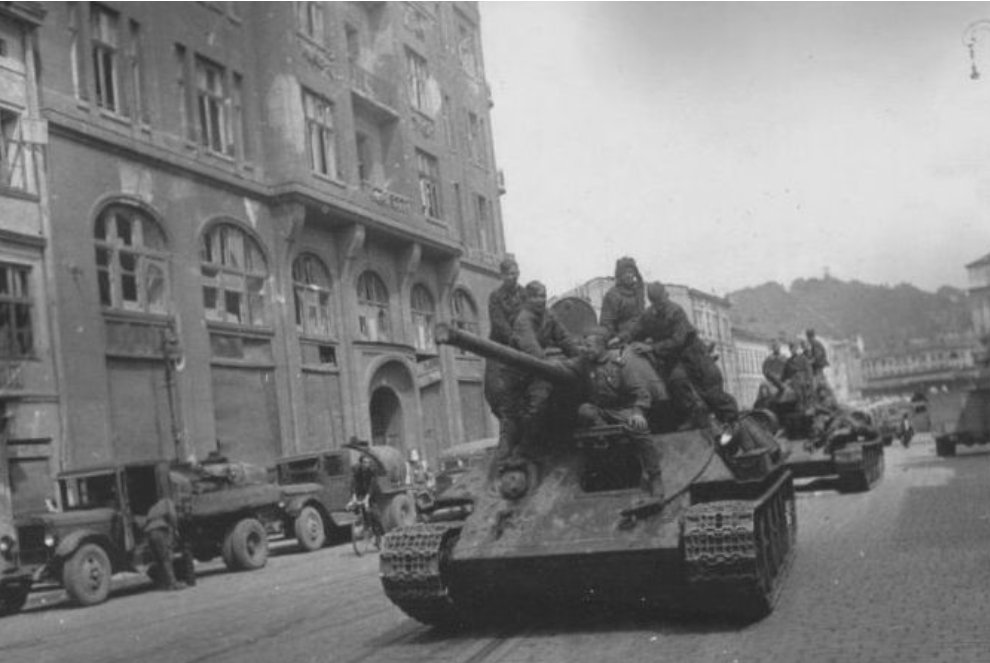
- Red Army soldiers and tanks enter Lvov, 27 July 1944
Date	13 July – 29 August 1944
Location	Western Ukraine/Eastern Poland
Result	Soviet victory

Belligerents
Germany; Hungary	Soviet Union

Commanders and leaders
(Nazi Germany) Josef Harpe; Erhard Raus; Walther Nehring; Ferenc Farkas; Otto Dessloch	(Soviet Union) Ivan Konev (Soviet Union) Mikhail Katukov (Soviet Union) Pavel Rybalko (Soviet Union) Dmitry Lelyushenko (Soviet Union) Vasiliy Gordov (Soviet Union) Nikolay Pukhov (Soviet Union) Kirill Moskalenko (Soviet Union) Pavel Kurochkin (Soviet Union) Stepan Krasovsky

Units involved
Army Group North Ukraine: 1st Panzer Army; 4th Panzer Army; 1st Army; Luftflotte 4; Luftflotte 6	1st Ukrainian Front: 1st Guards Tank Army; 3rd Guards Tank Army; 4th Tank Army; 3rd Guards Army; 13th Army; 38th Army; 60th Army; 2nd Air Army

Strength
(Nazi Germany) On 1 July 1944: 547,000 ration strength (incl. rear support services); 440,512 actual strength (in divisions and GHQ combat units); 850 operational tanks and assault guns 978 tanks and assault guns in total (incl. in repairs); 976 guns 1,000 aircraft 255,000 ration strength (1 July 1944)	1,002,200 men 1,979 AFVs; 11,265 guns

Casualties and losses
(Nazi Germany); 55,000 killed, missing and captured 136,860 overall Casualty reports of the army group for 11 July–31 August 1944: 16,438 killed; 69,895 wounded; 57,500 missing; 143,833 in total; 30,000+ killed, wounded and missing in total	65,001 killed, missing or captured 224,295 wounded 1,269 tanks and SP guns 289 aircraft: 289,296 in total

The Lvov–Sandomierz offensive or Lvov–Sandomierz strategic offensive operation (Russian: Львовско-Сандомирская стратегическая наступательная операция) was a major Second World War operation by the Soviet Red Army to force German troops from Ukraine and Eastern Poland. The operation was launched in mid-July 1944, and successfully completed by the end of August.

The Lvov–Sandomierz offensive is generally overshadowed by the overwhelming successes of the concurrently conducted Operation Bagration that led to the destruction of the German Army Group Centre. However, most of the Red Army and Red Air Force resources were allocated, not to Bagration's Belorussian operations, but the Lvov-Sandomierz operations. The campaign was conducted as Maskirovka. By concentrating in southern Poland and Ukraine, the Soviets drew German mobile reserves southward, leaving Army Group Centre vulnerable to a concentrated assault. When the Soviets launched their Bagration offensive against Army Group Center, it created a crisis in the eastern German front which forced the powerful German Panzer forces back to the central front, leaving the Soviets free to then pursue their objectives in seizing western Ukraine, the Vistula bridgeheads, and gaining a foothold in Romania.

The offensive comprised the:

- Lvov offensive operation (13–27 July 1944)
- Stanislav offensive operation (13–27 July 1944)
- Sandomierz offensive operation (28 July – 29 August 1944)

In Soviet propaganda, this offensive was listed as one of Stalin's ten blows.

== Background ==
By early June 1944, the forces of German Field Marshal Walter Model's Army Group North Ukraine had been pushed back beyond the Dnieper and were desperately clinging to the north-western corner of Ukraine. Soviet ruler Joseph Stalin ordered the total liberation of Ukraine, and Stavka, the Soviet High Command, set in motion plans that would become the Lvov-Sandomierz Operation. In the early planning stage, the offensive was known as the Lvov-Przemyśl Operation. The objective of the offensive was for Marshal Ivan Konev's 1st Ukrainian Front to liberate Lvov, clear the German troops from Ukraine, and capture a series of bridgeheads on the Vistula river.

Stavka was also planning an even larger offensive, codenamed Operation Bagration to coincide with Konev's offensive. The objective of Operation Bagration was the complete liberation of Belarus, and to force the Wehrmacht out of eastern Poland. The Lvov–Sandomierz strategic offensive operation was to be the means of denying transfer of reserves by the German OKH to Army Group Centre, a supporting role to Operation Bagration in the summer of 1944.

== Opposing forces ==
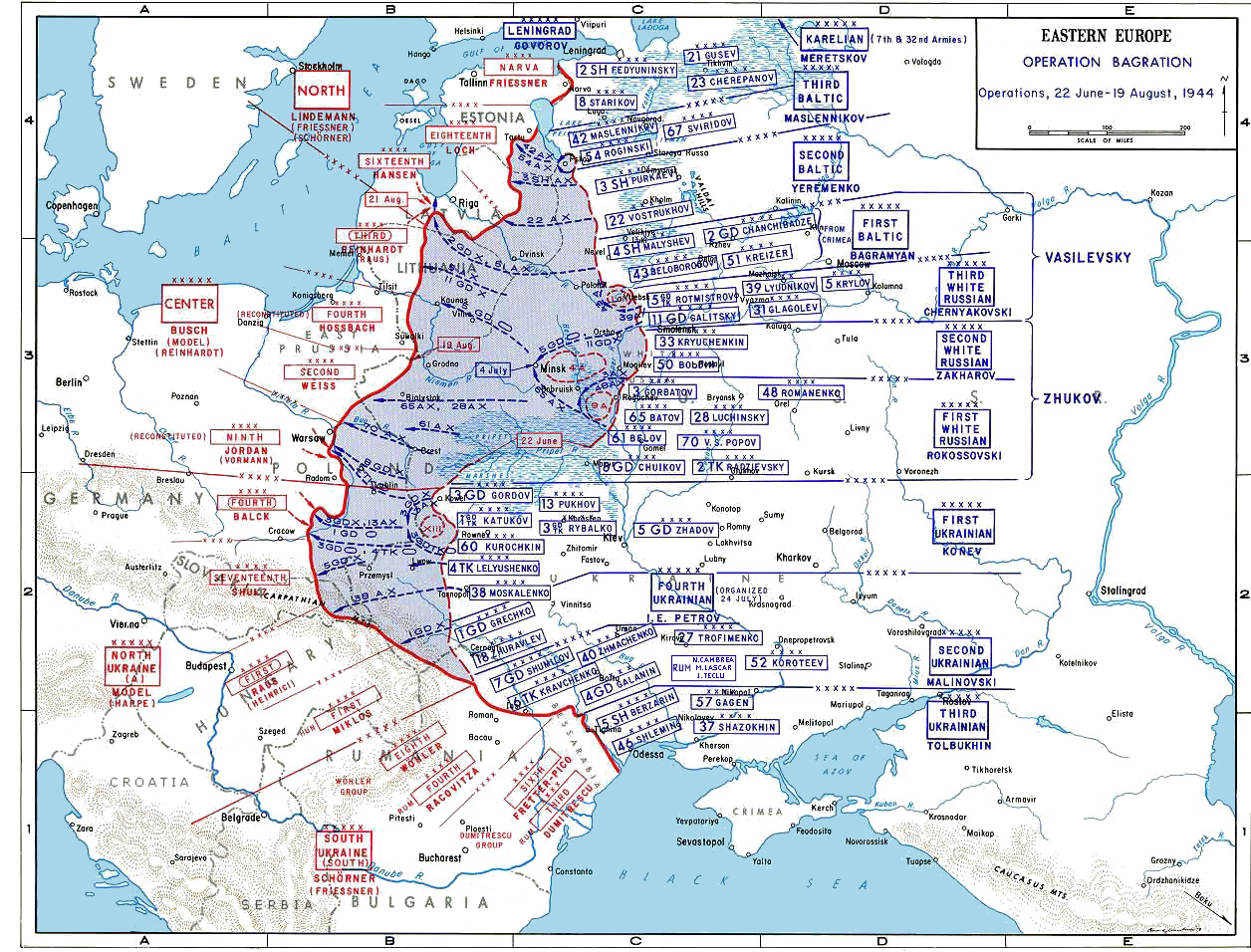
German and Soviet deployments on the Eastern Front, June to August 1944, showing Operation Bagration to the north, Lvov-Sandomierz to the south. The encirclement of the German XIII Army Corps at Brody is shown in Konev's First Ukrainian command.

While the Stavka was concluding its offensive plans, Field Marshal Model was removed from command of the Army Group North Ukraine and replaced by Colonel general Josef Harpe. Harpe's force included two Panzer armies: the 1st Panzer Army, under Colonel general Gotthard Heinrici and the 4th Panzer Army under General Walther Nehring. Attached to the 1st Panzer Army was the Hungarian First Army. Harpe could muster only 420 tanks, StuG's and other assorted armoured vehicles. His army group comprised around 400,000 men and was supported by the 700 aircraft of Luftflotte 4 (including the veteran air units of 8th Air Corps) and the 300-400 aircraft of the nearby Luftflotte 6. However, due to the complicated inter-service chain of command, Harpe could not directly control the Luftwaffe units.

The 1st Ukrainian Front forces under Konev considerably outnumbered the Army Group North Ukraine. The 1st Ukrainian Front could muster over 1,002,200 troops, some 2,050 tanks, about 16,000 guns and mortars, and over 3,250 aircraft of the 2nd Air Army commanded by General Stepan Krasovsky. In addition the morale of Konev's troops was extremely high following the recent victories in Ukraine. They had been on the offensive for almost a year, and were witnessing the collapse of Army Group Centre to their North.

The 1st Ukrainian Front attack was to have two axes of attack. The first, aiming towards Rava-Ruska, was to be led by 3rd Guards, 1st Guards Tank and 13th Armies. The second pincer was aimed at Lvov itself, and was to be led by 60th, 38th, 3rd Guards Tank and 4th Tank Armies. The Red Army achieved massive superiority against the Germans by limiting their attacks to a front of only 26 kilometres. Konev had concentrated some 240 guns and mortars per kilometer of front.

== The assault begins ==
The northern attack towards Rava-Ruska began on 13 July 1944. The 1st Ukrainian Front forces easily broke through near Horokhiv. The weakened Wehrmacht XLII Army Corps managed to withdraw relatively intact using reinforced rearguard detachments. By nightfall, the 1st Ukrainian Front's 13th Army had penetrated the German lines to a depth of 20 kilometers. The 1st Ukrainian Front's breakthrough occurred to the north of the XIII Army Corps.

On 14 July 1944, the assault with the objective of liberating Lvov was begun to the south of the German XIII Army Corps, which had positions near the town of Brody, an area of Red Army failure earlier in the war. Red Army units had punched through the line near Horokhiv to the north and at Nyshche in the south, leaving the XIII Corps dangerously exposed in a salient. The northern pincer towards Rava-Ruska now began to split, turning several units of the 13th Army south in an attempt to encircle XIII Army Corps.

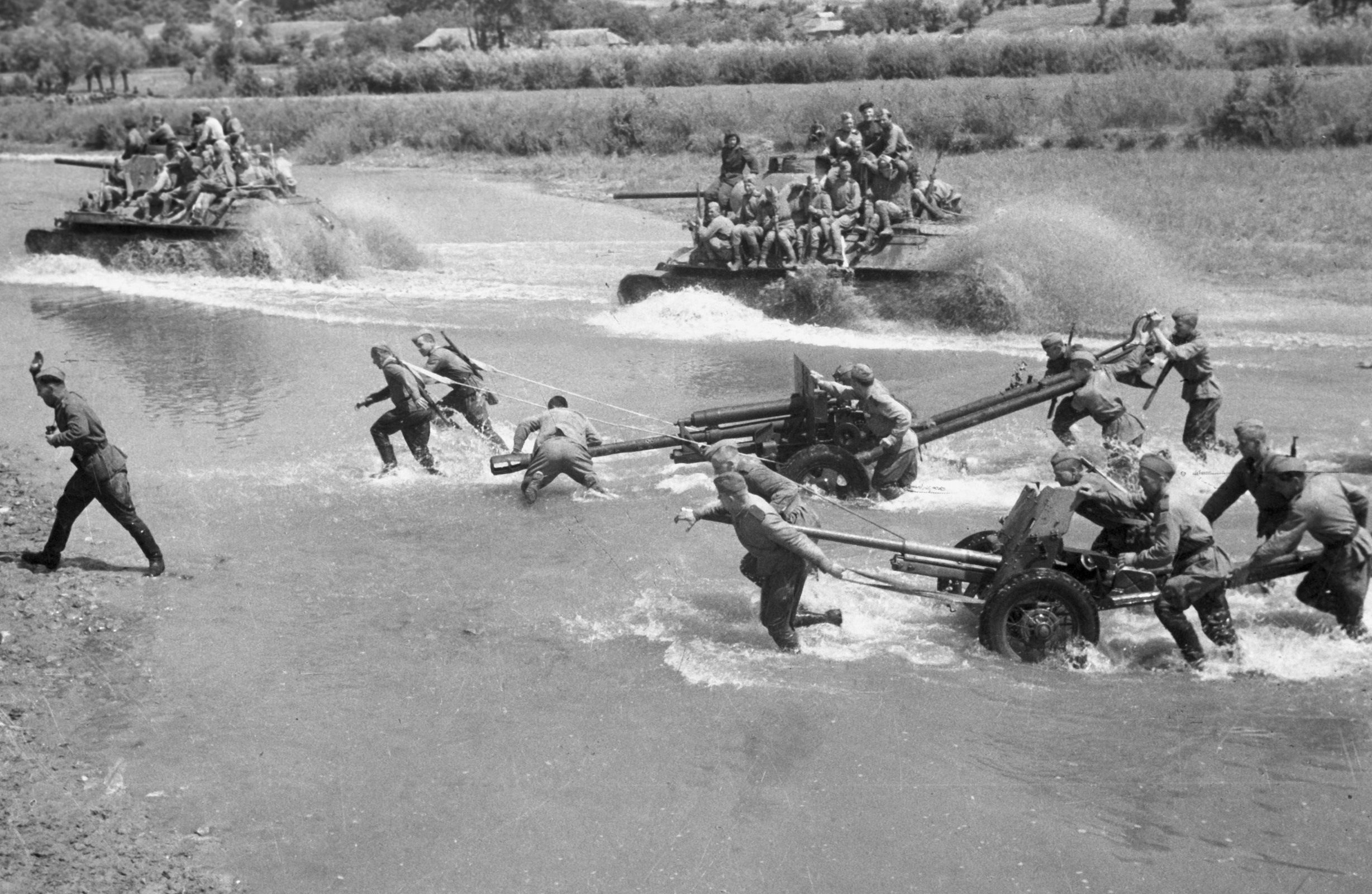
Soviet T-34 tanks and artillery crossing the Western Bug, July 1944

The northern forces soon encountered weak German elements of the 291st and 340th Infantry Divisions, but these were quickly swept aside. On 15 July, Nehring, realising his 4th Panzer Army was in serious jeopardy, ordered his two reserve divisions, the 16th and 17th Panzer Divisions to counterattack near Horokhiv and Druzhkopil in an attempt to halt the Soviet northern assault. The two divisions could muster only 43 tanks between them, and despite their best efforts the German counterattack soon bogged down. The massively superior Red Army forces soon forced the two Panzer divisions to join the retreating infantry divisions. Konev ordered Mobile Group Baranov into the breach to help exploit the breakthrough. The Mobile Group advanced quickly, under cover of air support, and over the next three days managed to capture the town of Kamionka Strumilowa and to seize and hold a bridgehead on the western bank of the Western Bug River, thus cutting the XIII Army Corps' line of communication and cutting off their path of retreat.

== Encirclement at Brody (Brody Cauldron) ==
To the south, a major Red Army assault aimed at the juncture of the 1st and 4th Panzer Armies was not repulsed on 14 July by the division-sized Korpsabteilung C. It was repulsed primarily by the 349th Infantry Division. The 1st Ukrainian Front shifted their attack further south, and after an immense artillery and air bombardment assaulted the depleted 349th and 357th Infantry Divisions. The 349th Infantry Division did not collapse under the assault, although it was hit very hard and the survivors temporarily fell back in disarray. Even a cursory glance at its War Diary demonstrates that this division continued to take part in offensive operations form 14 to 19 July. Korpsabteilung C initially played virtually no part in opposing the Soviet breakthrough. The 357th Infantry Division, 349th Infantry Division, the SS-Freiwillge Division 'Galizien' and the III. Panzer Korps, in particular the 8th Panzer Division, helped to contain the breakthrough and limit it to a gap 3–4 km (1.9–2.5 mi) wide. Only because of their massive overwhelming superiority in every respect was the 1st Ukrainian Front able to advance towards the towns of Zolochiv and Sasiv, driving a wedge between XIII Army Corps and the neighboring XLVIII Panzer Corps.

German artillery from both Corps and the 18th Artillery Division tried but failed to saturate the narrow breakthrough area dubbed the Koltiv Corridor because it was too spread out on the high ground to be able to concentrate its fire to be effective. A hasty counterattack by the 1st Panzer Division and the 8th Panzer Division took place, accompanied by elements of the SS Division Galicia. While the infantry fought well, the 1st Panzer Division and the 8th Panzer Division were hit by a massive air assault. The 8th Panzer Division fared worse as its commander General Friebe disobeyed orders and moved his tanks on an open and exposed road. The German command responded to this unforgivable mistake by declaring that Friebe was "sick" and replacing him as the divisional commander. Despite initial gains, the 1st Ukrainian Front finally managed to halt the German attack, with the help of the 2nd Air Army, which dropped 17,200 bombs on the attacking German tanks. The absence of the 8th Panzer Division meant that the attack was doomed to fail. The commander of 8th Panzer Division had ignored his orders and tried to lead his force on a short cut. Instead, the division was strung out on the Zolochiv–Zboriv section of the Lvov–Ternopil road, and suffered immense losses from Red Air Force Il-2s. Despite this, the southern attack was slowing.

On 16 July, Konev took a great risk and committed the 3rd Guards Tank Army (Lieutenant General Pavel Rybalko) to the southern assault. This meant that the Army would have to travel through the narrow Koltiv Corridor, constantly under artillery fire and fierce German counterattacks. The 3rd Guards Tank Army tilted the balance in the Lvov direction, and soon the Soviet advance resumed its course west. The commander of the XIII Army Corps realised that his Corps needed to retreat if it were to avoid encirclement. The order was given for all Corps units to fall back to the Prinz-Eugen-Stellung, a series of unmanned defensive positions built in June 1944 which ran partly along the Strypa river about 35 km (22 mi) west of Ternopil. Strong 1st Ukrainian Front attacks throughout 17 July captured parts of the Prinz-Eugen-Stellung. The 349th Infantry Division, the SS Division Galicia and the fusilier Battalion of Korpsabteilung C joined the combat to recapture these lost positions but after some success, failed, due to overwhelming Soviet superiority. XLVIII.Pz.Kps command still believed that its III. Panzer Korps could restore the German front and so the Corps commander, General Arthur Hauffe, did not order further withdrawal, condemning the three XIII Army Corps divisions and Korps-Abteilung C in the Brody salient to their fate.

On 18 July, 1st Ukrainian Front attacks resulted in a breakthrough in the Lvov operational direction. Late in the day, the 1st Ukrainian Front spearheads met near the town of Busk. The encirclement was complete. 45,000 men of the XIII Army Corps were trapped around Brody, and a 200 km (120 mi) breach had been created along the Army Group North Ukraine's front.

== Annihilation at Brody: objectives redefined ==
For the men trapped at Brody, help would not come. Despite several desperate attacks by the exhausted and under strength forces of XLVIII Panzer Corps and XXIV Panzer Corps, the 1st Ukrainian Front cordon continued to tighten. Under continued 1st Ukrainian Front attacks, Harpe ordered his forces to fall back, abandoning the trapped XIII Army Corps. Under constant artillery and aerial bombardment, the beleaguered forces made several breakout attempts, but these were easily repulsed by the 1st Ukrainian Front armoured forces and the Germans suffered heavy casualties. On 22 July, a 1st Ukrainian Front attack cut the pocket in two, and by nightfall almost all resistance had been eliminated. The scattered survivors broke up into small groups and attempted to break out. The German War Diaries evidence that approximately 15,000 men reached German lines including about 3,500 men of the SS Division Galicia. Before the operation, the division had numbered 11,000 men. Konev was elated at the unexpected success of the operation. Harpe's Army Group was falling back; the 4th Panzer Army to the Vistula River and the 1st Panzer Army along with 1st Hungarian Army to the area around the Carpathian Mountains.

Lvov itself was occupied again by the Soviets on 26 July, the first time being in September 1939. This time, the city was retaken by the 1st Ukrainian Front, a Soviet force, relatively easily. The Germans had been completely forced out from Western Ukraine. Seeing this success, Stavka issued new orders on 28 July. Konev was to attack across the Vistula and to capture the city of Sandomierz, in Nazi-occupied southern Poland. Ukrainian hopes of independence were squashed amidst the overwhelming force of the Soviets, much like in Estonia, Latvia, and Lithuania. The Ukrainian Insurgent Army, UPA, would continue waging a guerrilla war against the Soviets well into the 1950s.

== Renewed attack: capture of Sandomierz ==
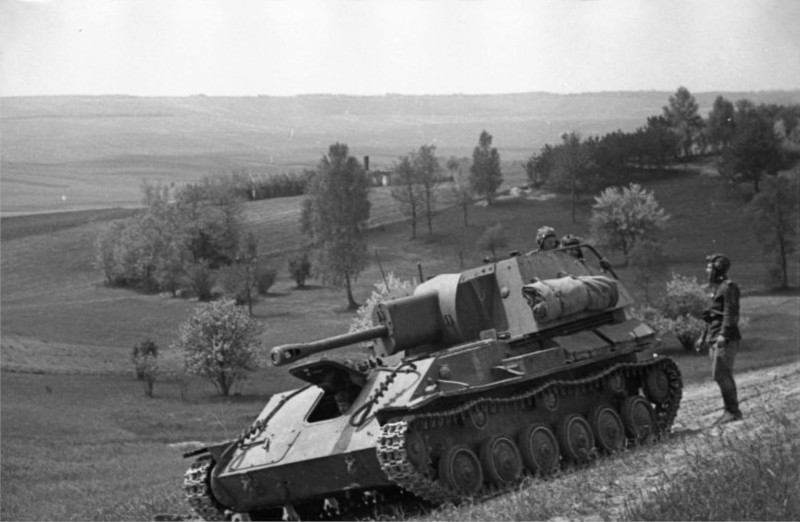
An SU-76 of the 1st Ukrainian Front in the Carpathian foothills, early August 1944

The renewed Soviet offensive got underway on 29 July, with Konev's spearheads quickly reaching the Vistula and establishing a strong bridgehead near Baranów Sandomierski. However, strong German counterattacks near Sandomierz prevented further expansion of the Soviet bridgehead. In early August, Harpe gained some respite. Five divisions, including one Panzer division, were transferred from Army Group South Ukraine. These were immediately thrown into action around Sandomierz. Soon after, another five German divisions, three Hungarian divisions, six StuG brigades and the 501st Heavy Tank Battalion (equipped with Tiger II tanks) were placed under Harpe's command.

Large-scale German counterattacks were launched in an attempt to throw the Soviets back across the Vistula. Using the towns of Mielec and Tarnobrzeg on the eastern bank of the river as bases, these attacks caused heavy casualties to the Soviet forces. By mid-August, Konev's spearhead, the 6th Guards Tank Corps had only 67 tanks remaining. The Germans launched a fierce counterattack with the 501st Heavy Tank Battalion and the 16th Panzer Division, totaling around 140 tanks including 20 Tiger IIs. Despite being heavily outnumbered, the 6th Guards held the bridgehead, knocking out 10 Tiger IIs. By 16 August, the German counterattacks were beginning to lose steam, and Rybalko, the commander of the bridgehead, was able to expand the Soviet controlled area by a depth of 120 kilometers, capturing the city of Sandomierz. With both sides exhausted, the fighting died down and the Lvov–Sandomierz offensive was deemed complete.

== Order of battle ==
=== Red Army ===
1st Ukrainian Front (Konev)

Rava-Ruska operational direction

- 3rd Guards Army (Gordov)
- 1st Guards Tank Army (Katukov)
- 13th Army (Pukhov)

Lvov operational direction

- 60th Army (Kurochkin)
- 38th Army (Moskalenko)
- 3rd Guards Tank Army (Rybalko)
- 4th Tank Army (Lelyushenko)
- 2nd Air Army (Krasovsky)

=== Axis ===
Army Group North Ukraine (Generaloberst Josef Harpe) - 12 July 1944

- 18th Artillery Division
- 4th Panzer Army (General der Panzertruppen Walther Nehring)
  - XLVI Panzer Corps
    - 16th Panzer Division
    - 17th Panzer Division
    - 291st Infantry Division
    - 340th Infantry Division
    - + Group Beutler?
  - XLII Army Corps (General der Infanterie Hermann Recknagel)
    - 72nd Infantry Division
    - 88th Infantry Division
    - 214th Inf./Sec.? Division
    - + 213th Security Division?
  - LVI Panzer Corps (General der Infanterie Johannes Block)
    - 26th Infantry Division
    - 342nd Infantry Division
    - 1st Ski Jäger Division
    - + 253rd Infantry Division?
  - VIII Corps (General der Infanterie Gustav Höhne)
    - 5th Jäger Division
    - 211th Infantry Division
    - 12th Hungarian Reserve Division
- 1st Panzer Army (Generaloberst Erhard Raus)
  - XIII Army Corps (General der Infanterie Arthur Hauffe)
    - Korpsabteilung C - Generalmajor Wolfgang Lange (Div. Gruppe 183, 217 & 339)
    - 361st Infantry Division
    - 454th Security Division
    - + 14th Waffen Grenadier Division of the SS (1st Ukrainian) (from Reserve)
  - XLVIII Panzer Corps (General der Panzertruppen Hermann Balck)
    - 96th Infantry Division
    - 349th Infantry Division
    - 359th Infantry Division
    - + 357th Infantry Division?
  - III Panzer Corps (General der Panzertruppe Hermann Breith)
    - 1st Panzer Division
    - 8th Panzer Division
  - XXIV Panzer Corps (General der Panzertruppen Fritz-Hubert Gräser)
    - 20th Panzergrenadier Division (from Reserve)
    - 100th Jäger Division
    - 75th Infantry Division
    - 254th Infantry Division
    - 371st Infantry Division
  - LIX Army Corps (General der Infanterie Edgar Röhricht)
    - 1st Infantry Division
    - 208th Infantry Division
    - 20th Hungarian Infantry Division
- 1st Hungarian Army (Lieutenant General Ferenc Farkas - acting)
  - XI Army Corps (General der Infanterie Rudolf von Bünau)
    - 101st Jäger Division
    - 24th Hungarian Infantry Division
    - 25th Hungarian Infantry Division
    - 18th Hungarian Reserve Division
  - VIIth Hungarian Army Corps
    - 16th Hungarian Infantry Division
    - 68th Infantry Division
    - 168th Infantry Division (elements)
  - VIth Hungarian Army Corps
    - 27th Hungarian Light Division
    - 1st Hungarian Mountain Brigade
  - Hungarian First Army Reserve
    - 2nd Hungarian Panzer Division
    - 2nd Hungarian Mountain Brigade (elements attached to VIth Corps)
    - 19th Hungarian Reserve Division
- Luftflotte 4
  - VIII. Fliegerkorps
  - nearby Luftflotte 6

== Casualty estimates ==
Wehrmacht reports stressed the successful withdrawal of several forces, in line with the Frieser estimate. Soviet estimates were considerably higher: according to an August 1944 report by the Soviet Information Bureau, German forces suffered 350,000 casualties. Of these, 140,000 were killed and 32,360 captured, primarily in the Brody pocket. Additionally, the Soviets claimed to have taken out 1,941 German tanks and 687 aircraft during the offensive.
