= Paul Klatt =

German general (1896-1973)

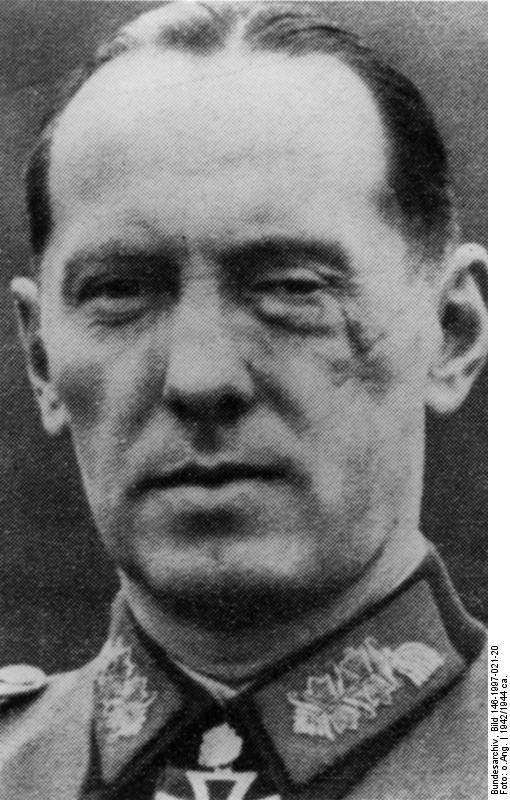
- Born: 6 December 1896
- Died: 6 June 1973 (aged 76)
- Military career
- Allegiance: Nazi Germany
- Branch: Army (Wehrmacht)
- Rank: Generalleutnant
- Commands: 3rd Mountain Division
- Conflicts: World War II
- Awards: Knight's Cross of the Iron Cross with Oak Leaves

Paul Klatt (6 December 1896 – 6 June 1973) was a German general who commanded the 3rd Mountain Division during World War II. He was a recipient of the Knight's Cross of the Iron Cross with Oak Leaves of Nazi Germany.

Klatt surrendered to the Red Army in the course of the Soviet 1945 Prague Offensive. Convicted as a criminal in the Soviet Union, he was held until 1955, when he was repatriated to Germany.

== First World War ==
At the start of the First World War, Klatt entered the German Army as an officer candidate in an artillery regiment. After training at the Kriegsschule in Döberitz between December 1914 and February 1915, he was posted to Silesian Infantry Regiment Nr. 51, serving on the Western Front. Here he was seriously wounded on 18 May 1915. After recuperation, he returned to the front with his regiment in December 1915, and was serving as adjutant when he was taken prisoner by the British on 9 April 1917.

For his services during World War One he received the Iron Cross First and Second Class and the Wound Badge in Black.

== Service between the Wars ==
He was released in October 1919, and returned to serve in the Reichswehr as an infantry officer. By 1938 he was serving as commander of Gebirgspionier-Bataillon 83 in 3.Gebirgs-Division.

== Second World War ==
With the outbreak of the Second World War his regiment took part in the Invasion of Poland 1939 as part of Army Group South, but was transferred to garrison duties on the West Wall before the end of the campaign. In 1940 the division joined the invasion of Norway, and took part in Operation Silberfuchs, the attack on the Soviet Arctic as part of Operation Barbarossa.

In August 1941 he was placed in temporary command of Gebirgsjäger-Regiment 138; which was confirmed in October 1941. He was awarded the Knight’s Cross in November 1942 for his actions as commander of the regiment in defensive actions around Tschernosjem, near Cholm.

He was wounded in December 1942, as the division took part in attempts to relive Stalingrad, and was promoted to Generalmajor on 20 February 1944. He was appointed to command 3. Gebirgs-Division on 3 July 1944, and was subsequently awarded the Oakleaves to the Knights Cross in December for his command of the division in the Battle of Debrecen.

He was still in command of the 3. Gebirgs-Division when he surrendered to the Red Army on 8 May 1945 in Silesia. He was eventually released on 5 October 1955, among the last German PoWs to be released. After his release he wrote a history of 3. Gebirgs-Division during the Second World War. He died on 3 July 1973 in Olching, near Munich.

== Awards and decorations ==
- Iron Cross (1914) 2nd Class (4 February 1916) & 1st Class (12 March 1920)
- Clasp to the Iron Cross (1939) 2nd Class (30 March 1940) & 1st Class (8 December 1940)
- German Cross in Gold on 14 April 1942 as Oberst in Gebirgsjäger-Regiment 138
- Knight's Cross of the Iron Cross with Oak Leaves
  - Knight's Cross on 4 January 1943 as Oberst and commander of Gebirgsjäger-Regiment 138
  - 686th Oak Leaves on 26 December 1944 as Generalleutnant and commander of 3.Gebirgs-Division

Military offices
| Preceded by Generalleutnant August Wittmann | Commander of 3.Gebirgs-Division; 3 July 1944 – 8 May 1945 | Succeeded by None |
