= August Wittmann =

German general of World War II

- Born: 20 July 1895; Munich, Kingdom of Bavaria, German Empire
- Died: 29 March 1977 (aged 81); Glonn, Bavaria, West Germany
- Relatives: ∞ 1923 Hildegard Schilling
- Military career
- Allegiance: German Empire; Weimar Republic; Nazi Germany
- Branch: Bavarian Army; Imperial German Army; Preliminary Reichswehr; Police; German Heer
- Service years: 1914–1945
- Rank: Generalleutnant
- Units: 390th Field Training Division; 3rd Mountain Division; 117th Jäger Division; 1st Mountain Division
- Conflicts: World War I; World War II; Battle of the Netherlands; Battle of Greece; Battle of Crete; Battle of the Dnieper; World War II in Yugoslavia; Belgrade Offensive; Prague Offensive
- Awards: Knight's Cross of the Iron Cross

August Wittmann (20 July 1895 – 29 March 1977) was a general in the Wehrmacht during World War II. He was a recipient of the Knight's Cross of the Iron Cross.

== Life and career ==
August Wittmann was born in Munich on 20 July 1895. He entered the Bavarian Army as a volunteer shortly after the outbreak of World War I in August 1914, joining a Bavarian Field Artillery Regiment. Commissioned lieutenant in 1917, he joined the Freikorps on 22 April 1919, joined the preliminary Reichswehr on 1 July 1919 and left the army on 30 September 1920. He then served with the Bavarian State Police until 1935.

In October 1935 Wittmann rejoined the army and was given command of a Gebirgs (mountain) artillery battalion, rising to lead an artillery regiment three years later. In June 1941, during the battle of Crete, he was awarded the Knight's Cross of the Iron Cross for his leadership of a mountain artillery regiment. Becoming a divisional commander from February 1943, he commanded the 390th Field Training Division and then the 3rd Mountain Division on the Eastern Front, followed by the 117th Jäger Division and the 1st Mountain Division in the Balkans and Austria. He surrendered with his unit in May 1945.

Wittmann ended the war as a Generalleutnant, after promotion to this rank in April 1944.

== Awards and decorations ==
- Iron Cross (1914), 2nd Class on 6 May 1914
- Military Merit Cross (Bavaria), 3rd Class with Swords (BMVK3X/BM5cX) on 17 June 1915
- Military Merit Order (Bavaria), 4th Class with Swords (BMV4X/BM4X) on 17 September 1917
- Wound Badge (1918) in Black
- DRA German Gymnastics and Sports Badge in Bronze
- Army Mountain Guide Badge (Heeresbergführer-Abzeichen), c. 1931
- Honour Cross of the World War 1914/1918 with Swords in December 1934
- German Olympic Commemorative Medal
- Wehrmacht Long Service Award, 4th to 1st Class (25-year Service Cross)
  - 2nd Class on 2 October 1936
  - 1st Class in 1939
- Anschluss Medal
- Repetition Clasp 1939 to the Iron Cross 1914, 2nd Class on 3 October 1939
- Iron Cross (1939), 1st Class on 25 May 1940
- Mentioned in the Wehrmachtbericht (Armed Forces Report) of 11 June 1941 as Oberstleutnant and commander of Gebirgs-Artillerie-Regiment 95 (95th Mountain Artillery Regiment) during the battle of Crete.
- General Assault Badge on 27 January 1942
- Crete Cuff Title
- Knight's Cross of the Iron Cross on 21 June 1941 as Oberstleutnant and Commander of the 95th Mountain Artillery Regiment during the Battle of Crete
- German Cross in Gold on 25 August 1944 as Generalleutnant and Commander of the 3 Gebirgs-Division (3rd Mountain Division) on the Eastern Front

Military offices
Preceded by Generalleutnant Egbert Picker	Commander of 3. Gebirgs Division; 29 September 1943 – 3 July 1944	Succeeded by Generalleutnant Paul Klatt
Preceded by General der Gebirgstruppe Karl von Le Suire	Commander of 117. Jäger Division; 10 July 1944 – 10 March 1945	Succeeded by Generalmajor Hans Kreppel
Preceded by Generalleutnant Josef Kübler	Commander of 1. Gebirgs Division; 10 March 1945 – 8 May 1945	Succeeded by None
