= List of Knight's Cross of the Iron Cross recipients (G) =

The Knight's Cross of the Iron Cross (German: Ritterkreuz des Eisernen Kreuzes) and its variants were the highest awards in the military and paramilitary forces of Nazi Germany during World War II. The Knight's Cross of the Iron Cross was awarded for a wide range of reasons and across all ranks, from a senior commander for skilled leadership of his troops in battle to a low-ranking soldier for a single act of extreme gallantry. A total of 7,321 awards were made between its first presentation on 30 September 1939 and its last bestowal on 17 June 1945. (Note: Großadmiral and President of Germany Karl Dönitz, Hitler's successor as Head of State (Staatsoberhaupt) and Supreme Commander of the Armed Forces, had ordered the cessation of all promotions and awards as of 11 May 1945 (Dönitz-decree). Consequently the last Knight's Cross awarded to Oberleutnant zur See of the Reserves Georg-Wolfgang Feller on 17 June 1945 must therefore be considered a de facto but not de jure hand-out.) This number is based on the analysis and acceptance of the order commission of the Association of Knight's Cross Recipients (AKCR). Presentations were made to members of the three military branches of the Wehrmacht—the Heer (Army), Kriegsmarine (Navy) and Luftwaffe (Air Force)—as well as the Waffen-SS, the Reichsarbeitsdienst (RAD—Reich Labour Service) and the Volkssturm (German national militia). There were also 43 recipients in the military forces of allies of the Third Reich.

These recipients are listed in the 1986 edition of Walther-Peer Fellgiebel's book, Die Träger des Ritterkreuzes des Eisernen Kreuzes 1939–1945 [The Bearers of the Knight's Cross of the Iron Cross 1939–1945]. Fellgiebel was the former chairman and head of the order commission of the AKCR. In 1996, the second edition of this book was published with an addendum delisting 11 of these original recipients. Author Veit Scherzer has cast doubt on a further 193 of these listings. The majority of the disputed recipients had been nominated for the award in 1945, when the deteriorating situation of Germany during the final days of World War II left a number of nominations incomplete and pending in various stages of the approval process.

Listed here are the 380 Knight's Cross recipients of the Wehrmacht and Waffen-SS whose last name starts with "G". Fellgiebel himself delisted one and Scherzer has challenged the validity of eleven more of these listings. The recipients are ordered alphabetically by last name. The rank listed is the recipient's rank at the time the Knight's Cross was awarded.

== Background ==
The Knight's Cross of the Iron Cross and its higher grades were based on four separate enactments. The first enactment, Reichsgesetzblatt I S. 1573 of 1 September 1939 instituted the Iron Cross (Eisernes Kreuz), the Knight's Cross of the Iron Cross and the Grand Cross of the Iron Cross (Großkreuz des Eisernen Kreuzes). Article 2 of the enactment mandated that the award of a higher class be preceded by the award of all preceding classes. As the war progressed, some of the recipients of the Knight's Cross distinguished themselves further and a higher grade, the Knight's Cross of the Iron Cross with Oak Leaves (Ritterkreuz des Eisernen Kreuzes mit Eichenlaub), was instituted. The Oak Leaves, as they were commonly referred to, were based on the enactment Reichsgesetzblatt I S. 849 of 3 June 1940. In 1941, two higher grades of the Knight's Cross were instituted. The enactment Reichsgesetzblatt I S. 613 of 28 September 1941 introduced the Knight's Cross of the Iron Cross with Oak Leaves and Swords (Ritterkreuz des Eisernen Kreuzes mit Eichenlaub und Schwertern) and the Knight's Cross of the Iron Cross with Oak Leaves, Swords and Diamonds (Ritterkreuz des Eisernen Kreuzes mit Eichenlaub, Schwertern und Brillanten). At the end of 1944 the final grade, the Knight's Cross of the Iron Cross with Golden Oak Leaves, Swords, and Diamonds (Ritterkreuz des Eisernen Kreuzes mit goldenem Eichenlaub, Schwertern und Brillanten), based on the enactment Reichsgesetzblatt 1945 I S. 11 of 29 December 1944, became the final variant of the Knight's Cross authorized.

== Recipients ==
Knight's Cross of the Iron Cross (G)
Service	Number of presentations	Posthumous presentations
Heer	238	22
Kriegsmarine	12	2
Luftwaffe	98	7
Waffen-SS	32	2

The Oberkommando der Wehrmacht (Supreme Command of the Armed Forces) kept separate Knight's Cross lists, one for each of the three military branches, Heer (Army), Kriegsmarine (Navy), Luftwaffe (Air Force) and for the Waffen-SS. Within each of these lists a unique sequential number was assigned to each recipient. The same numbering paradigm was applied to the higher grades of the Knight's Cross, one list per grade. Of the 380 awards made to servicemen whose last name starts with "G", 37 were later awarded the Knight's Cross of the Iron Cross with Oak Leaves, four the Knight's Cross of the Iron Cross with Oak Leaves and Swords, four the Knight's Cross of the Iron Cross with Oak Leaves, Swords and Diamonds and one the Grand Cross of the Iron Cross; 33 presentations were made posthumously. Heer members received 238 of the medals; 12 went to the Kriegsmarine, 98 to the Luftwaffe, and 32 to the Waffen-SS. The sequential numbers greater than 843 for the Knight's Cross of the Iron Cross with Oak Leaves and 143 for the Knight's Cross of the Iron Cross with Oak Leaves and Swords are unofficial and were assigned by the Association of Knight's Cross Recipients (AKCR) and are therefore denoted in parentheses.

This along with the + (plus) indicates that a higher grade of Knight's Cross was awarded as well.
This along with the * (asterisk) indicates that the Knight's Cross was awarded posthumously.
This along with the ! (exclamation mark) indicates that author Walther-Peer Fellgiebel has expressed doubt regarding the veracity and formal correctness of the listing.
This along with the ? (question mark) indicates that author Veit Scherzer has expressed doubt regarding the veracity and formal correctness of the listing.

Name	Service	Rank	Role and unit (Note: For an explanation of the various naming schemes used by the Luftwaffe, Heer, Kriegsmarine and Waffen-SS refer to nomenclature used by the Wehrmacht and Waffen-SS.)	Date of award	Notes	Image
Eccard Freiherr von Gablenz	Heer	Generalleutnant	Commander of the 7. Infanterie-Division	15 August 1940	—	
Erdmann Gabriel	Heer	Oberfeldwebel	Zugführer (platoon leader) in the II./Panzer-Regiment 35	30 August 1941	—	—
Dr.-med. Ernst Gadermann	Luftwaffe	Stabsarzt (rank equivalent to Hauptmann)	Group doctor of the III./Sturzkampfgeschwader 2 "Immelmann"	19 August 1944	—	—
Friedrich Gaeb	Heer	Unteroffizier	Zugführer (platoon leader) in the 1.(reit)/Divisions-Aufklärungs-Abteilung 97 (Note: According to Scherzer as Zugführer (platoon leader) in the 1./Aufklärungs-Abteilung 97.)	19 December 1943	—	—
Heinrich Gaedcke	Heer	Oberst im Generalstab (in the General Staff)	Chief of the Generalstab of XI. Armeekorps	7 April 1944	—	—
Ernst Gaedckens	Heer	Oberfeldwebel	Zugführer (platoon leader) and shock troops leader in the 2./Grenadier-Regiment 46	2 April 1943	—	—
Wilhelm Gänsler	Luftwaffe	Oberfeldwebel	Air gunner in the Stabsstaffel IV./Nachtjagdgeschwader 1 (Note: According to Scherzer as air gunner in the Stab IV./Nachtjagdgeschwader 1.)	27 July 1944	—	—
Georg Gärtner	Heer	Hauptmann	Commander of the I./Sturm-Regiment 195	21 September 1944	—	—
Roberts Gaigals? (Note: Roberts Gaigals' nomination had been finalized by the Heerespersonalamt (HPA—Army Staff Office) and was ready for signature by the end of the war. According to the Association of Knight's Cross Recipients (AKCR) the award was presented in accordance with the Dönitz-decree. This is illegal according to the Deutsche Dienststelle (WASt) and lacks legal justification. The presentation date is an assumption of the AKCR.)	Waffen-SS	Waffen-Obersturmführer	Leader of the 6./Waffen-Grenadier-Regiment 42 of the SS "Voldemars Veiss"	5 May 1945	—	—
Otto Gaillinger	Heer	Oberleutnant (Note: According to Scherzer as Leutnant.)	Leader of the 1./Infanterie-Bataillon z.b.V. 500	8 October 1943*	Killed in action 29 September 1943	—
Otto Gaiser	Luftwaffe	Oberfeldwebel	Pilot in the 10./Jagdgeschwader 51 "Mölders"	9 June 1944*	Missing in action assumed killed in action 22 January 1944	—
Wilhelm Gaißer	Heer	Leutnant of the Reserves	Leader of the 1./Grenadier-Regiment 3	17 March 1945	—	—
Nikolajs Galdiņš	Waffen-SS	Waffen-Obersturmbannführer	Commander of Waffen-Grenadier-Regiment der SS Nr. 42 "Voldemars Veiss" (Note: According to Scherzer as commander of Waffen-Grenadier-Regiment der SS 42 (lett. Nr. 1).)	25 January 1945	—	—
Eugen Gall	Heer	Leutnant (Note: According to Scherzer as Leutnant of the Reserves.)	Leader of the 6./Grenadier-Regiment 335	17 March 1945	—	—
Franz Gall	Heer	Generalleutnant	Defender of the island fortress Elba (Note: According to Scherzer as commander of the defensive sector Elba.)	19 June 1944	—	—
Adolf Galland+	Luftwaffe	Major	Gruppenkommandeur of the III./Jagdgeschwader 26 "Schlageter"	29 July 1940	Awarded 3rd Oak Leaves 24 September 1940; 1st Swords 21 June 1941; 2nd Diamonds 28 January 1942	
Wilhelm-Ferdinand Galland	Luftwaffe	Hauptmann	Gruppenkommandeur of the II./Jagdgeschwader 26 "Schlageter"	18 May 1943	—	—
Josef Galle	Heer	Wachtmeister	Zugführer (platoon leader) of the 3./Sturmgeschütz-Abteilung 244	25 January 1943	—	—
Curt Gallenkamp	Heer	Generalleutnant	Commander of the 78. Infanterie-Division	19 November 1941	—	—
Bernd Gallowitsch	Luftwaffe	Leutnant	Pilot in the 12./Jagdgeschwader 51 "Mölders"	24 January 1942	—	—
Friedrich Galow	Heer	Wachtmeister	Vorgeschobener Beobachter (forward observer) in the 8./Artillerie-Regiment 389 (Note: According to Scherzer as Vorgeschobener Beobachter (forward observer) in the 2./Artillerie-Regiment 389.)	10 September 1944*	Killed in action 21 July 1944	—
Richard Gambietz	Heer	Obergefreiter	In the Stabskompanie/Schützen-Regiment 93	27 May 1942	—	—
Berthold Gamer	Heer	Hauptmann	Commander of the II./Artillerie-Regiment 178 (motorized) (Note: According to Scherzer as commander of the II./Artillerie-Regiment 178.)	25 January 1943	—	—
Jakob Gansmeier+	Heer	Hauptmann of the Reserves	Commander of Divisions-Füsilier-Bataillon (A.A.) 212 (Note: According to Scherzer as commander of Divisions-Füsilier-Bataillon 212.)	29 February 1944	Awarded 568th Oak Leaves 2 September 1944	—
Franz-Josef Ganssen	Heer	Unteroffizier	Company troop leader in the 9./Grenadier-Regiment 159	29 February 1944	—	—
Franz Gapp	Luftwaffe	Oberfeldwebel	Pilot in the 8./Kampfgeschwader 6	18 September 1943 (Note: According to Scherzer on 19 September 1943.)	—	—
Heinrich Garbers	Kriegsmarine	Leutnant zur See of the Reserves (Note: According to Scherzer as Leutnant zur See and commander of Hilfskriegsschiff "Passim".)	Commander of Hilfskriegsschiff "Passim" and leader of special assignments	1 November 1944	—	—
Martin Gareis	Heer	Generalleutnant	Commander of the 98. Infanterie-Division	29 November 1943	—	—
Wilhelm Gareis	Heer	Oberst of the Reserves	Commander of Artillerie-Regiment 3 (L)	5 February 1944*	Killed in action 18 December 1943	—
Arnulf von Garn	Heer	Major	Commander of Divisions-Füsilier-Bataillon 252	2 September 1944	—	—
Detlev Graf von Garnier-Turawa	Heer	Oberleutnant of the Reserves	Commander of the I./Grenadier-Regiment 439	18 January 1944	—	—
Eugen Garski	Heer	Oberstleutnant	Commander of the III./Infanterie-Regiment "Großdeutschland" (motorized)	19 July 1940	—	—
Karl-Edmund Gartenfeld	Luftwaffe	Hauptmann (Note: According to Scherzer as Hauptmann of the Reserves and Staffelführer in the Aufklärungs-Gruppe der OB der Luftwaffe.)	Staffelführer in the (F) Aufklärungs-Gruppe der OB der Luftwaffe	3 February 1943	—	—
Wirich von Gartzen	Kriegsmarine	Korvettenkapitän	Chief of the 10. Torpedobootflottille	24 June 1944	—	—
Walter Garz	Heer	Feldwebel	Zugführer (platoon leader) in the 3./Panzergrenadier-Regiment 74	16 December 1942	—	—
Peter Gaßmann	Luftwaffe	Hauptmann	Gruppenkommandeur of the III./Sturzkampfgeschwader 1	25 May 1942	—	—
Robert Gast	Luftwaffe	Leutnant	Leader of the 9./Fallschirmjäger-Regiment 7	6 October 1944	—	—
Wolfgang Gast	Waffen-SS	SS-Obersturmführer	Leader of the I./SS-Panzer-Artillerie-Regiment 2 "Das Reich" (Note: According to Scherzer as leader of the I./SS-Panzer-Artillerie-Regiment 2.)	4 June 1944	—	—
Heinrich Gath	Heer	Stabsfeldwebel	Zugführer (platoon leader) in the 2./Panzer-Aufklärungs-Abteilung 2	11 October 1943	—	—
[Dr.] Wilhelm Gathmann (Note: The brackets around the doctor title [Dr.] denotes that the academic title was attained after the Knight's Cross of the Iron Cross was awarded.)	Heer	Major	Commander of the II./Artillerie-Regiment 14	28 March 1945	—	—
Helmut Gattermann	Heer	Hauptmann of the Reserves	Chief of the 1./Sturmgeschütz-Brigade 209	12 August 1944	—	—
Gerlach von Gaudecker-Zuch	Heer	Oberstleutnant	Commander of Panzergrenadier-Regiment 33	8 August 1944	—	—
Josef Gauglitz	Heer	Oberleutnant	Leader of the III./Panzer-Regiment 33	16 November 1944	—	—
Albert Gaum	Heer	Hauptmann	Chief of the 11./Gebirgsjäger-Regiment 100	13 June 1941	—	—
Georg Reichsfreiherr von Gaupp-Berghausen	Heer	Hauptmann	Commander of the II./Panzergrenadier-Regiment 12	30 September 1944	—	—
Alfred Gause	Heer	Generalmajor	Chief of the Generalstab of the Panzer Gruppe "Afrika"	13 December 1941	—	—
Jürgen Gauß	Heer	Hauptmann	Leader of a Kampfgruppe in the 12. Panzer-Division	28 March 1945	—	—
Waldemar von Gazen+ also known as von Gaza	Heer	Oberleutnant	Chief of the 2./Panzergrenadier-Regiment 66	18 September 1942	Awarded 182nd Oak Leaves 18 January 1943; 38th Swords 3 October 1943	
Fritz Gebauer	Heer	Oberfeldwebel	Shock troops leader in the 3./Grenz-Pionier-Bataillon 74	13 July 1940	—	—
Georg Gebhard	Heer	Major	Commander of the III./Grenadier-Brigade 503	23 October 1944	—	—
Gebhard? (Note: No evidence regarding the presentation of the Knight's Cross of the Iron Cross to an SS-Oberscharführer Gebhard can be found in the German Federal Archives. Walther-Peer Fellgiebel also had no evidence and wrote on 11 July 1983 to Mr. Eichhorn: "I have to rely on Krätschmer in Rieflin Fritz's case, as well as in Gebhard's.". Krätschmer may have his information from Hermann Buch, the former IIa (personnel administration for officers) of the 2. SS-Division "Das Reich", who mentioned the name Gebhard in a letter to Von Seeman on 6 December 1970. Unlawful presentation by SS-Oberstgruppenführer Sepp Dietrich. The date is taken from the announcement made by the 6. SS-Panzerarmee.)	Waffen-SS	SS-Oberscharführer	Zugführer (platoon leader) in the 2./SS-Panzer-Pionier-Bataillon 2 "Das Reich"	6 May 1945	—	—
Georg Gebhardt+	Heer	Hauptmann of the Reserves	Commander of III./Jäger-Regiment 204	15 May 1943	Awarded 743rd Oak Leaves 19 February 1945	—
Rolf Gebhardt	Heer	Fahnenjunker-Feldwebel	Zugführer (platoon leader) in the 2./schwere Panzer-Abteilung 507	30 September 1944	—	—
Ernst-Wilhelm Freiherr Gedult von Jungenfeld	Heer	Oberst of the Reserves	Leader of a Kampfgruppe (Note: According to Scherzer as leader of a Kampfgruppe in the Armee-Abteilung Serbien.)	11 January 1945	—	—
Arno Geelhaar	Heer	Leutnant of the Reserves	Leader of the 7./Grenadier-Regiment 151	16 April 1944	—	—
Paul Gehl? (Note: Paul Gehl's nomination by the troop was received by the Heerespersonalamt (HPA—Army Staff Office) on 24 March 1945 as a teleprinter messenger, the written nomination was received on 3 April. Major Joachim Domaschk had stopped an ongoing approval process of the Honour Roll Clasp for Gehl on 25 March, indicating: "Stop! Forward here!". Domaschk requested a detailed combat report from Gehl's division following the receipt of the written nomination on 4 April, which he received on 17 April. The next day he approved the nomination. A Heerespersonalamt-Verleihungsvorschlag (HPA-VV—Army Staff Office Nomination Recommendation) Nr. 5078 was created and forwarded the very same day. This information is noted on the file card. No further information regarding the approval or presentation of the Knight's Cross is indicated. According to the Association of Knight's Cross Recipients (AKCR) the award was presented in accordance with the Dönitz-decree. This is illegal according to the Deutsche Dienststelle (WASt) and lacks legal justification. The presentation date was assigned by Walther-Peer Fellgiebel.)	Heer	Oberleutnant of the Reserves	Leader of the I./Grenadier-Regiment 453	9 May 1945	—	—
Kurt Gehrke	Heer	Oberstleutnant	Commander of the I./Grenadier-Regiment "Großdeutschland"	8 February 1943	—	—
Gerhard Gehrmann	Heer	Oberleutnant of the Reserves	Chief of the 3./Grenadier-Regiment 422	15 April 1944	—	—
Johannes Gehrmann	Luftwaffe	Hauptmann of the Reserves (Note: According to Scherzer as Hauptmann and deputy Gruppenkommandeur of the I./Schlachtgeschwader 1.)	Staffelkapitän of the 6./Schlachtgeschwader 1	31 December 1943	—	—
August Geiger+	Luftwaffe	Oberleutnant	Staffelkapitän of the 7./Nachtjagdgeschwader 1	22 May 1943	Awarded 416th Oak Leaves 2 March 1944	—
Georg Geiger	Heer	Obergefreiter	Group leader in the 10./Grenadier-Regiment 19 "List"	20 October 1944	—	—
Herbert Geiger	Heer	Oberfeldwebel	Company troop leader in the 1./Grenadier-Regiment 380	8 August 1944	—	—
Wilhelm Geisberg	Heer	Oberleutnant	Chief of the 3./Führer-Panzer-Regiment 1 (Führer-Begleit-Division) (Note: According to Scherzer as chief of the 3./Führer-Panzer-Regiment 1.)	14 April 1945	—	—
Hans Geisler	Luftwaffe	Generalleutnant	Commanding general of X. Fliegerkorps	4 May 1940	—	
Herbert Geisler	Luftwaffe	Oberfeldwebel	Pilot in the Stabsstaffel/Kampfgeschwader 4 "General Wever"	24 October 1944	—	—
Kurt Geisler	Luftwaffe	Hauptmann	Commander of Lufttransportgruppe Don	24 January 1943	—	—
Rudolf Geisler+	Heer	Major	Commander of Pionier-Bataillon 662	7 December 1943	Awarded 455th Oak Leaves 13 April 1944	—
Siegfried Geisler	Luftwaffe	Hauptmann	Gruppenkommandeur of the II./Kampfgeschwader 76	20 July 1944	—	—
Johannes Geismann	Luftwaffe	Leutnant	Pilot in the 1./Kampfgeschwader 77	21 December 1942	—	—
Friedrich Geißhardt+	Luftwaffe	Leutnant	Pilot in the I./Jagdgeschwader 77 (Note: According to Scherzer as pilot and adjutant in the Stab I.(Jagd)/Lehrgeschwader 2.)	30 August 1941	Awarded 101st Oak Leaves 23 June 1942	
Erich Geißler	Heer	Oberst	Commander of Infanterie-Regiment 200 (motorized) in DAK (Note: According to Scherzer as commander of Infanterie-Regiment (motorized) 200.)	29 July 1942	—	—
Gottfried Geißler	Heer	Oberleutnant	Chief of the 3./Sturmgeschütz-Abteilung 185	21 August 1941	—	—
Helmut Geißler	Heer	Oberst	Commander of Grenadier-Regiment 187	7 January 1944*	Killed in action 15 December 1943	—
Karl Geißler	Heer	Oberleutnant of the Reserves	Chief of the 5./Grenadier-Regiment 46	1 February 1945	—	—
Willy Geißler (Note: According to Scherzer name is spelled Willy Geisler.)	Heer	Unteroffizier	Group leader in the 5./Panzer-Aufklärungs-Abteilung 7	14 May 1944	—	—
Rudi Gelbhaar	Kriegsmarine	Oberleutnant (M.A.) of the Reserves	Chief of Marine-Batterie "Hamburg" in the Marine-Artillerie-Abteilung 604	26 June 1944	—	—
Harald Gelhaus	Kriegsmarine	Kapitänleutnant	Commander of U-107	26 March 1943	—	—
Hans Gelhausen	Heer	Hauptmann	Leader of the I./Grenadier-Regiment 457	28 March 1945	—	—
Christian Gellert	Luftwaffe	Oberleutnant	Battery leader in the I./Flak-Regiment 43 (motorized) (Note: According to Scherzer as leader in the I./Flak-Regiment (motorized) 43.)	11 June 1944	—	—
Roland Gellhorn	Heer	Major	Adjutant of the 75. Infanterie-Division	14 February 1945	—	—
Dionys Geltinger	Heer	Major	Commander of the III./Artillerie-Regiment 251	2 September 1944	—	—
Alfred Gemsjäger	Luftwaffe	Leutnant	Oberserver in the 6.(F)/Aufklärungs-Gruppe 122 (Note: According to Scherzer as oberserver in the Aufklärungsstaffe 6.(F)/122.)	16 December 1944*	Killed in action 2 September 1944	—
Otto Gemünden	Luftwaffe	Wachtmeister	Gun leader in the I./Flak-Regiment 49 in Flak-Regiment 37 (Note: According to Scherzer on 10 October 1942 as gun leader in the 1./Flak-Regiment 49.)	12 October 1942	—	—
Oskar Genrich	Luftwaffe	Oberleutnant	Pilot in the 2.(F)/Aufklärungs-Gruppe 11 (Note: According to Scherzer as pilot in the Aufklärungsstaffe 2.(F)/122.)	3 November 1942	—	—
Ludwig Gensberger	Heer	Oberleutnant (Note: According to Scherzer as Oberleutnant of the Reserves and chief of the 13./Grenadier-Regiment 544.)	Chief of the 13.(IG)/Grenadier-Regiment 544	5 April 1945*	Killed in action 23 February 1945	—
Alfred Genz	Luftwaffe	Oberleutnant	Chief of the 1./Fallschirmjäger-Sturm-Regiment (Note: According to Scherzer as chief of the 1./Fallschirmjäger-Sturm-Regiment 1.)	14 June 1941	—	—
Karl-Heinz Genzel	Heer	Hauptmann	Leader of the I./Grenadier-Regiment 32	26 November 1944	—	—
Joachim Genzow	Luftwaffe	Oberleutnant	Staffelkapitän of the 4./Kampfgeschwader 2 (Note: According to Scherzer as pilot in the II./Kampfgeschwader 2.)	23 March 1941	—	—
Erich Geppert	Heer	Oberleutnant (Note: According to Scherzer as Oberleutnant of the Reserves.)	Leader of the 3./Sturmgeschütz-Abteilung 209	14 April 1943	—	—
Arthur Gerber	Heer	Feldwebel	Zugführer (platoon leader) in the Stabskompanie/Grenadier-Regiment 401	18 February 1945	—	—
Hinrich Gerdes	Heer	Oberfeldwebel	Zugführer (platoon leader) in the 3./Panzer-Regiment 36	21 January 1945	—	—
Hans Gerdts	Heer	Obergefreiter	Wireless radio operator in the 3./Artillerie-Regiment 196	9 December 1944	—	—
Rudolf Gerhardt	Heer	Major	Commander of the II./Panzer-Regiment 7	22 September 1941	—	—
Walther Gerhold	Kriegsmarine	Marine-Schreiber-Obergefreiter (Note: According to Scherzer as Schreiber-Obergefreiter.)	Einmanntorpedofahrer in the Kleinkampfflottille 361	6 July 1944	—	
Walter Gericke+	Luftwaffe	Hauptmann	Commander of the IV./Fallschirmjäger-Sturm-Regiment (Note: According to Scherzer as commander of the IV./Fallschirmjäger-Sturm-Regiment 1.)	14 June 1941	Awarded 585th Oak Leaves 17 September 1944	
Siegfried Gerke	Heer	Leutnant of the Reserves	Zugführer (platoon leader) in the 3./Panzer-Pionier-Bataillon 16	2 December 1942	—	—
Franz Gerl	Heer	Oberfeldwebel	Zugführer (platoon leader) in the 13.(IG)/Grenadier-Regiment 110 (Note: According to Scherzer as Zugführer (platoon leader) in the 13./Grenadier-Regiment 110.)	8 May 1943	—	—
Heinrich Gerlach	Luftwaffe	Hauptmann	Pilot with the commanding general of the XI. Fliegerkorps in conjunction with the Mussolini rescue	19 September 1943	—	—
Dr. Julius Gerlach	Heer	Hauptmann of the Reserves	Commander of the III./Infanterie-Regiment 507	10 February 1942	—	—
Karl Gerlach? (Note: No evidence regarding the presentation of the Knight's Cross of the Iron Cross to Karl Gerlach can be found in the German Federal Archives. Gerlach is listed by Von Seemen, noting: "No evidence in the German Federal Archives". The author Veit Scherzer was denied access to files, which could help clarify the case, of the Association of Knight's Cross Recipients (AKCR) on the grounds of the Bundesarchivgesetz (German Archive Law). The order commission of the AKCR processed this case in 1983/1984 and decided "Knight's Cross yes, 17 April 1945". What evidence was used and lead to this decision remains unclear. Walther-Peer Fellgiebel later changed the presentation date to 3 May 1945. Gerlach was a member of the AKCR.)	Heer	Oberleutnant	Chief of the 4./Panzergrenadier-Regiment 35	3 May 1945	—	—
Ludwig Gerlach	Heer	Hauptmann	Commander of the I./Grenadier-Regiment 409	23 March 1945	—	—
Waldemar Gerlach	Heer	Oberleutnant	Chief of the 2./MG-Bataillon 13	9 May 1940	—	—
Bruno Gerloch	Heer	Oberstleutnant	Commander of Artillerie-Regiment 90	4 September 1940	—	—
Alfred Germer	Heer	Oberleutnant	Chief of the 1./Pionier-Bataillon 171	26 May 1940	—	—
Ernst Germer	Luftwaffe	Fahnenjunker-Feldwebel	Leader of the bicycle platoon in the Stabskompanie/Fallschirmjäger-Regiment 1	29 October 1944	—	
Rudolf Christoph Freiherr von Gersdorff	Heer	Oberst im Generalstab (in the General Staff)	Chief of the Generalstab of the 7. Armee	26 August 1944	—	
Wilhelm Gerstenberg	Heer	Feldwebel	Zugführer (platoon leader) in the 4./Grenadier-Regiment 287	4 May 1944*	Killed in action 26 April 1944	—
Günter Gersteuer? (Note: Günter Gersteuer's nomination by the Außenstelle of the Heerespersonalamt (HPA/A—Branch of the Army Staff Office) was ready for signature by the end of the war. According to the Association of Knight's Cross Recipients (AKCR) the award was presented in accordance with the Dönitz-decree. This is illegal according to the Deutsche Dienststelle (WASt) and lacks legal justification. The presentation date is an assumption of the AKCR.)	Luftwaffe	Major	Commander of Fallschirm-Sturmgeschütz-Brigade 12	28 April 1945	—	—
Siegfried Gerstner	Luftwaffe	Major	Commander of the II./Fallschirmjäger-Regiment 7	13 September 1944	—	
Walter Gerth	Waffen-SS	SS-Obersturmführer of the Reserves	Chief of the 7./SS-Panzer-Artillerie-Regiment 3 "Totenkopf" (Note: According to Scherzer as chief of the 7./SS-"Totenkopf"-Artillerie-Regiment.)	31 March 1943	—	
Werner Gerth	Luftwaffe	Oberleutnant	Staffelkapitän of the Sturmstaffel in the IV./Jagdgeschwader 3 "Udet" (Note: According to Scherzer as Staffelkapitän of the 14.(Sturm)/Jagdgeschwader 3 "Udet".)	29 October 1944	—	—
Gerhard Gertler	Heer	Oberfeldwebel	Company troop leader in the 7./Jäger-Regiment 83	18 September 1943	—	—
Heinz Geschwill	Luftwaffe	Leutnant	Pilot in the 9./Kampfgeschwader 3 "Lützow"	23 March 1941	—	—
Karl Gesele	Waffen-SS	SS-Obersturmbannführer	Commander of SS-Sturmbrigde "Reichsführer SS" (sp. 16. SS-Panzergrenadier-Division) (Note: According to Scherzer as commander of SS-Sturmbrigde "Reichsführer SS".)	4 July 1944	—	—
Franz Geskens	Heer	Feldwebel	Zugführer (platoon leader) in the 3./Panzer-Jäger-Abteilung 187	9 December 1944*	Killed in action 3 November 1944	—
Harald Geßner	Heer	Leutnant	Leader of the 10./Grenadier-Regiment 61	13 September 1943	—	—
Hans Gewehr	Heer	Hauptmann of the Reserves (Note: According to Scherzer as Hauptmann and adjutant in the Grenadier-Regiment 698.)	Regiment adjutant in the Grenadier-Regiment 698	4 June 1944	—	—
Joachim Gey	Luftwaffe	Oberleutnant	Staffelkapitän in the II./Kampfgeschwader 3 "Lützow"	21 June 1943	—	—
Heinrich Geyer	Heer	Feldwebel	Zugführer (platoon leader) in the 2./Panzergrenadier-Regiment 6	22 October 1944	—	—
Hermann Geyer	Heer	General der Infanterie zur Verwendung (for disposition)	Commanding general IX. Armeekorps	25 June 1940	—	
Leo Reichsfreiherr Geyr von Schweppenburg	Heer	General der Panzertruppe	Commanding general of the XXIV. Armeekorps (motorized)	9 July 1941	—	
Dr.-phil. Hans Gidion	Heer	Hauptmann of the Reserves	Leader of the II./Infanterie-Regiment 154	7 August 1942	—	—
Walter Giehrl	Heer	Oberleutnant	Leader of the 7./Gebirgsjäger-Regiment 138	31 July 1942	—	—
Albert Gielnik	Heer	Leutnant	Company leader in the Grenadier-Ersatz and Ausbildungs-Bataillon 318	24 February 1945*	Died of wounds 23 February 1943	—
Kurt Gierga	Heer	Hauptmann	Chief of the 5./Panzer-Regiment 5	30 June 1941	—	—
Franz Gierster	Heer	Hauptmann (Note: According to Scherzer as Hauptmann of the Reserves.)	Leader of the Infanterie-Bataillon z.b.V. 540	15 May 1944*	Killed in action 22 January 1944	—
Alfred Gies	Luftwaffe	Oberfeldwebel	Pilot in the 1./Schlachtgeschwader 2 "Immelmann"	16 December 1944	—	—
Horst Giese	Heer	Leutnant	Leader of the 2./Panzer-Abteilung 5	17 April 1945	—	—
Otto Gieseke	Waffen-SS	SS-Standartenführer and Oberst of the Schupo	Commander of SS-Polizei-Schützen-Regiment 1	30 September 1942	—	—
Karl-Heinz Gieseler! (Note: Karl-Heinz Gieseler is listed as a recipient in Fellgiebel and Von Seemen as SS-Untersturmführer and Stoßtruppführer in Berlin as a member of the 11. SS-Panzergrenadier-Division "Nordland". Von Seemen indicates that: "No evidence in the German Federal Archives". Fellgiebel states that the presentation was made by SS-Brigadeführer Wilhelm Mohnke in the bunker of the Reichs Chancellery between 25 and 30 April 1945. The number of likely presentations varies between 3 and 5 soldiers. No evidence of the award can be found in the German Federal Archives. Gieseler is not listed by Scherzer.)	Waffen-SS	SS-Untersturmführer	Stoßtruppführer (shock troops leader) in Berlin (in the 11. SS-Panzergrenadier-Division "Nordland")	29 April 1945	—	—
Gerhard Giesen	Heer	Oberst (Note: According to Scherzer as Oberst of the Reserves.)	Commander of Grenadier-Regiment 123	11 March 1945*	Killed in action 5 February 1945	—
Karl-Heinz Giffhorn	Heer	Leutnant of the Reserves	Vorgeschobener Beobachter (forward observer) in the 6./Artillerie-Regiment 190 (motorized)	18 November 1944	—	—
Erich Gilbert	Heer	Hauptmann	Commander of the II./Grenadier-Regiment 116	30 April 1945*	Killed in action 16 February 1945	—
Paul Gildner+	Luftwaffe	Oberfeldwebel	Pilot in the 3./Nachtjagdgeschwader 1 (Note: According to Scherzer as pilot in the 4./Nachtjagdgeschwader 1.)	9 July 1941	Awarded 196th Oak Leaves 26 February 1943	—
Herbert Otto Gille+	Waffen-SS	SS-Oberführer	Commander of SS-Artillerie-Regiment 5 "Wiking" (Note: According to Scherzer as commander of Artillerie-Regiment SS-Division "Wiking".)	8 October 1942	Awarded 315th Oak Leaves 1 November 1943; 47th Swords 20 February 1944; 12th Diamonds 19 April 1944	
Léon Gillis	Waffen-SS	SS-Untersturmführer	Zugführer (platoon leader) in the 5. SS-Freiwilligen-Sturmbrigade "Wallonie"	30 September 1944	—	—
Peter Gilow	Heer	Oberleutnant	Leader of the 2./Panzer-Regiment 1	14 September 1942	—	—
Werner-Albrecht Freiherr von und zu Gilsa+	Heer	Oberst	Commander of Infanterie-Regiment 9	5 June 1940	Awarded 68th Oak Leaves 24 January 1942	—
Walter Girg+	Waffen-SS	SS-Untersturmführer (Note: According to Scherzer as SS-Obersturmführer of the Reserves.)	Zugführer (platoon leader) in the 1./SS-Jäger-Bataillon 502	4 October 1944	Awarded 814th Oak Leaves 1 April 1945	—
Herbert Gladewitz	Heer	Leutnant of the Reserves	Leader of the 7./Ski-Jäger-Regiment 1	20 October 1944	—	—
Dieter Gläsche	Heer	Oberleutnant	Company leader in the Panzergrenadier-Regiment 11	17 April 1945	—	—
Wolfgang Glaesemer	Heer	Oberst	Commander of Panzergrenadier-Regiment 6	12 February 1943	—	—
Alexander Gläser+	Luftwaffe	Oberleutnant	Staffelkapitän of the 4./Sturzkampfgeschwader 77	19 February 1943	Awarded 811th Oak Leaves 28 March 1945	—
Erich Glaeser	Heer	Major	Commander of the II./Infanterie-Regiment 484	20 August 1942	—	—
Karl Glätzer	Heer	Hauptmann	Leader of the I./Grenadier-Regiment 426	9 April 1944	—	—
Erwin Glander	Heer	Leutnant of the Reserves	Leader of the 2./Sturmgeschütz-Brigade 210	21 September 1944*	Killed in action 2 August 1944	—
Friedrich Glaser	Heer	Obergefreiter	Richtschütze (gunner) in the 14.(Panzerjäger)/Grenadier-Regiment 253 (Note: According to Scherzer as Richtschütze (gunner) in the 14./Grenadier-Regiment 253.)	2 November 1943	—	—
Wilhelm Glaser	Heer	Oberleutnant of the Reserves	Zugführer (platoon leader) in the III./Grenadier-Regiment 35 (motorized)	17 August 1943	—	—
Anton Glasl	Heer	Oberst	Commander of Gebirgsjäger-Regiment 100	11 October 1943	—	—
Günter Glasner	Luftwaffe	Oberfeldwebel	Air gunner in the Stab/Kampfgeschwader 6	31 December 1943	—	—
Josef Glatz	Heer	Leutnant	Leader of the 1./Panzer-Jäger-Abteilung 46	12 January 1945	—	—
Walter Glembotzki	Luftwaffe	Leutnant of the Reserves	Leader of the 3./gemischte Flak-Abteilung 442 (verlegefähig—deployable) (Note: According to Scherzer as leader of the 3./(schwere) Flak-Abteilung 442.)	11 February 1945	—	—
Ludger Glettenberg	Heer	Major of the Reserves	Commander of the I./Infanterie-Regiment 549	24 September 1942*	Killed in action 11 August 1942	—
Paul Gliemann	Heer	Oberstleutnant	Commander of Grenadier-Regiment 481	24 December 1944	—	—
Dr. med.dent. Paul Gloger	Heer	Major	Commander of Sturmgeschütz-Abteilung 244	25 January 1943	—	—
Friedrich Glücksburg	Heer	Major	Commander of Panzergrenadier Regiment 40	22 February 1945	—	—
Adolf Glunz+	Luftwaffe	Oberfeldwebel	Pilot in the 4./Jagdgeschwader 26 "Schlageter"	29 August 1943	Awarded 508th Oak Leaves 24 June 1944	
Franz Gnaden	Heer	Major	Commander of the I./Gebirgsjäger-Regiment 85	8 August 1941	—	—
Fritz Gneikow	Heer	Unteroffizier	Group leader in the 3./Grenadier-Regiment 12	26 November 1944	—	—
Ernst-Ascan Gobert	Luftwaffe	Hauptmann	Staffelkapitän of the 2./Kampfgeschwader 53 "Legion Condor" (Note: According to Scherzer on 5 April 1944 as Staffelkapitän in the I./Kampfgeschwader 53 "Legion Condor".)	3 April 1944	—	—
Johannes Godde	Heer	Major	Commander of the III./Artillerie-Regiment 18 (L)	24 January 1945	—	—
Emil Goden	Heer	Oberfeldwebel	Zugführer (platoon leader) in the 3./Grenadier-Regiment 407	26 August 1943	—	—
Arthur Godenau	Kriegsmarine	Stabsobersteuermann	Commander of Räumboot R-51 in the 1. Räumbootflottille (Note: According to Scherzer as Commander of Räumboot R-17 in the 1. Räum-Halbflottille.)	31 May 1940	—	
Günter Goebel+	Heer	Oberleutnant	Regiments adjutant of Infanterie-Regiment 208 (Note: According to Scherzer as adjutant of Infanterie-Regiment 208.)	18 October 1941	Awarded 180th Oak Leaves 18 January 1943	
Günther Goebel	Heer	Hauptmann	Chief of the 1./Artillerie-Pak-Abteilung 1064 (motorized)	3 November 1944	—	—
Hans Göbel	Heer	Hauptmann	Commander of the II./Grenadier-Regiment 1226	29 April 1945	—	—
Herbert Göbel	Heer	Oberleutnant	Chief of the 11./Infanterie-Regiment 461	19 March 1941	—	—
Karl Göbel+	Heer	Major	Commander of the III./Infanterie-Regiment 420	10 September 1942	Awarded 252nd Oak Leaves 8 June 1943	—
Kilian Göbel	Heer	Oberfeldwebel	Zugführer (platoon leader) in the 1./Panzer-Jäger-Abteilung 49	26 November 1944*	Died of wounds 29 October 1944	—
Siegfried Göbel	Luftwaffe	Oberleutnant	Staffelkapitän in the III./Sturzkampfgeschwader 3	3 February 1943	—	—
Werner Göbel	Heer	Gefreiter	In the 7./Grenadier-Regiment 670	30 September 1944	—	—
Johannes Göhler	Waffen-SS	SS-Obersturmführer	Chief of the 4./SS-Reiter-Regiment 1	17 September 1943	—	—
Siegwart Göller? (Note: Siegwart Göller's nomination by the troop was received by the Heerespersonalamt (HPA—Army Staff Office) on 13 April 1945. Missing are the statements by the commander-in-chief of the Heeresgruppe Süd and Major Joachim Domaschk. It is questionable whether the prepared Heerespersonalamt-Verleihungsvorschlag (HPA-VV—Army Staff Office Nomination Recommendation) Nr. 5088 was forwarded for presentation to the Führer because Domaschk's statement is missing. It is likely that Domaschk had requested the statement by the Heeresgruppe Süd which he had not yet received. According to the Association of Knight's Cross Recipients (AKCR) the award was presented in accordance with the Dönitz-decree. According to the Deutsche Dienststelle (WASt) this lacks legal justification. The presentation date was assigned by Walther-Peer Fellgiebel. He is listed by Von Seemen under the name of Siegmund Göller with a presentation date 21 April 1945. However Von Seemen indicates that: "No evidence in the German Federal Archives".)	Heer	Hauptmann of the Reserves	Commander of the II./Gebirgsjäger-Regiment 98	9 May 1945	—	—
Dr.Dr. Wilhelm Göller	Heer	Oberst	Commander of fortress Pionier-Stab 30	27 December 1942	—	—
Ludwig Gölz	Heer	Hauptmann (Note: According to Scherzer as Hauptmann of the Reserves.)	Commander of Feldersatz-Bataillon 208	5 April 1945	—	—
Hermann Göring	Luftwaffe	Generalfeldmarschall	Reichsminister of aviation and commander-in-chief of the Luftwaffe	30 September 1939	Awarded 1st Grand Cross of the Iron Cross 19 July 1940	
Werner Goeritz	Heer	Generalleutnant	Commander of the 291. Infanterie-Division	6 November 1943	—	—
Rudolf Goerke	Heer	Leutnant of the Reserves	Leader of the 11./Grenadier-Regiment 410	9 June 1944	—	—
Richard Görlich	Heer	Unteroffizier	Group leader of the 1./Panzergrenadier-Regiment 394	4 July 1944	—	—
Jürgen von Goerne-Plaue	Heer	Hauptmann	Commander of Aufklärungs-Abteilung 29 (motorized)	20 October 1941	—	—
Ewald Görsch	Heer	Oberfeldwebel	Zugführer (platoon leader) in the 8./Panzergrenadier-Regiment 13	15 March 1943	—	—
Horst Görtler	Luftwaffe	Feldwebel	Pilot in the Stab/Schlachtgeschwader 77	28 March 1945	—	—
Helmut Görtz	Luftwaffe	Feldwebel	Zugführer (platoon leader) in the 3./Fallschirmjäger-Regiment 1	24 May 1940 (Note: According to Scherzer on 29 May 1940.)	—	—
Franz Gößmann	Heer	Oberfeldwebel	Zugführer (platoon leader) in the 2./Grenadier-Regiment 199 "List"	14 May 1944	—	—
[Dr.] Erich Göstl	Waffen-SS	SS-Panzergrenadier	Machine gunner 1 in 6./SS-Panzergrenadier-Regiment 1 "Leibstandarte SS Adolf Hitler" (Note: According to Scherzer as machine gunner in 6./SS-Panzergrenadier-Regiment 1 "Leibstandarte SS Adolf Hitler".)	31 October 1944	—	—
Oswin Göttert	Heer	Obergefreiter	Group leader in the 11./Grenadier-Regiment 445	7 September 1943	—	—
Rudolf Göttinger	Heer	Oberleutnant	Chief of the 13.(IG)/Gebirgsjäger-Regiment 91 (Note: According to Scherzer as chief of the 13./Gebirgsjäger-Regiment 91.)	14 December 1943	—	—
Johann Göttler	Heer	Oberfeldwebel	Zugführer (platoon leader) in the 6./Panzergrenadier-Regiment 63	1 September 1943	—	—
Waldemar Goettler	Heer	Feldwebel	Zugführer (platoon leader) in Abwehrkommando 201 (Inf.) (Note: According to Scherzer as Zugführer (platoon leader) in Frontaufklärungs-Kommando 201.)	2 August 1943	—	—
Franz Götz	Luftwaffe	Oberleutnant	Staffelkapitän of the 9./Jagdgeschwader 53	4 September 1942	—	—
Hans Götz	Luftwaffe	Oberleutnant	Pilot in the 2./Jagdgeschwader 54 (Note: According to Scherzer as pilot in the I./Jagdgeschwader 54.)	23 December 1942	—	—
Heinrich Götz+	Heer	Oberstleutnant	Commander of Infanterie-Regiment 466	3 May 1942	Awarded 765th Oak Leaves 5 March 1945	—
Karl Götze	Luftwaffe	Oberleutnant	Chief of the 1./Flak-Regiment 37 (motorized) (Note: According to Scherzer as chief of the 1./Flak-Regiment 37.)	21 July 1940	—	—
Manfred Goetze	Luftwaffe	Oberleutnant	Staffelführer of the 8./Schlachtgeschwader 10	19 August 1944	—	—
Axel Goetzke	Kriegsmarine	Leutnant zur See of the Reserves	Commander of Räumboot R-16 in the 5. Räumbootflottille (Note: According to Scherzer as commander of Räumboot R-61 in the 5. Räumbootflottille.)	27 December 1941*	Killed in action (sabotage) 14 September 1941	—
Otto Gohde	Heer	Oberfeldwebel	Deputy leader of the 3./Grenadier-Regiment 368	6 February 1944	—	—
Paul Golbach	Heer	Oberwachtmeister	Zugführer (platoon leader) in the 5./Artillerie-Regiment 263 (Note: According to Scherzer in the 5./Artillerie-Regiment 263.)	13 October 1941	—	—
Friedrich Goldammer	Heer	Hauptmann	Commander of Schnelle Abteilung 306	22 August 1943	—	—
Heinz Goldberg	Heer	Gefreiter	Richkanonier (gunner) in the 6./Artillerie-Regiment 333	27 September 1943	—	—
Kurt Goldbruch	Luftwaffe	Oberleutnant	Staffelkapitän of the 8./Schlachtgeschwader 1	28 January 1945	—	—
Jakob Goldbrunner	Heer	Feldwebel	Zugführer (platoon leader) in the 5./Infanterie-Regiment 19	17 September 1941	—	—
Heinz Golinski	Luftwaffe	Unteroffizier	Pilot in the 3./Jagdgeschwader 53 (Note: According to Scherzer as pilot in the I./Jagdgeschwader 53.)	30 October 1942*	Killed in action 16 October 1942	—
Eitel Goll	Heer	Rittmeister	Commander of Radfahr-Abteilung 117	13 September 1942	—	—
Josef Gollas	Heer	Feldwebel	Zugführer (platoon leader) of the 6./Infanterie-Regiment 106	18 November 1941	—	—
Josef Gollé	Heer	Major	Commander of the I./Infanterie-Regiment 339	19 July 1940	—	—
Hans-Detlef Gollert-Hansen+	Heer	Oberleutnant of the Reserves	Chief of the Radfahr-Aufklärungs-Schwadron 173	31 July 1943	Awarded 699th Oak Leaves 14 January 1945	—
Karl Golles	Luftwaffe	Oberfeldwebel	Pilot in the 9./Schlachtgeschwader 4	9 June 1944	—	—
Hans Gollnick+	Heer	Generalmajor	Commander of the 36. Infanterie-Division (motorized)	21 November 1942	Awarded 282nd Oak Leaves 24 August 1943	—
Klaus Gollnick	Heer	Hauptmann	Leader of Divisions-Füsilier-Bataillon 371	7 October 1944	—	—
Gordon Gollob+	Luftwaffe	Hauptmann	Gruppenkommandeur of the II./Jagdgeschwader 3	18 September 1941	Awarded 38th Oak Leaves 26 October 1941; 13th Swords 23 June 1942; 3rd Diamonds 30 August 1942 (Note: According to Scherzer Oak Leaves awarded on 25 October 1941.)	
Friedrich Gollwitzer	Heer	Generalleutnant	Commander of the 88. Infanterie-Division	8 February 1943	—	—
Albert Graf von der Goltz+	Heer	Major of the Reserves	Commander of the I./Infanterie-Regiment 415	7 May 1942	Awarded 316th Oak Leaves 2 November 1943	
Kurt Goltzsch	Luftwaffe	Leutnant	Pilot in the 5./Jagdgeschwader 2 "Richthofen"	5 February 1944	—	—
Herbert Golz? (Note: No evidence of the award can be found in the German Federal Archives. According to Krätschmer the action took place in March 1945 in Pomerania with the Army Group Vistula. Von Seemen lists Herbert Golz with the footnote: "Source: Generalmajor (Pol.) Ernst Rode, at the time chief of staff with the chief of the German Police". This posting is not verifiable. A SS-Brigadeführer and Generalmajor Rode is verifiable and was chief of staff of the field commando of the Reichsführer SS. This field commando processed at the time the nominations of the Waffen-SS and prepared them for approval by Heinrich Himmler. These nominations at the time were received by SS-Obersturmbannführer Wilhelm Kment, the adjutant of Himmler and liaison officer to the Heerespersonalamt (HPA—Army Staff Office). Golz nomination could have been a unlawful presentation by Himmler as commander in chief of the Army Group Vistula. The order commission of the Association of Knight's Cross Recipients (AKCR) handled this case in 1977 and decided: "Knight's Cross yes, 31 March 1945". The evidence sustaining this decision remains unclear. Access to the files was denied on the grounds of the Bundesarchivgesetz (German Archive Law). The presentation date was later changed by Fellgiebel. Golz was a member of the AKCR.)	Waffen-SS	SS-Standartenführer and Oberst of the Schupo	Chief of the Generalstab of the X. SS-Armeekorps and leader of a Kampfgruppe	3 May 1945	—	—
Richard Gombert	Heer	Oberleutnant of the Reserves	Leader of the 6./Jäger-Regiment 83	23 February 1944	—	—
Herbert Gomille	Heer	Hauptmann	Commander of the II./Panzer-Regiment 4	25 October 1942	—	—
Wilhelm Goriany (Note: According to Scherzer name is Wilhelm von Goriany.)	Heer	Major	Commander of the II./Gebirgs-Artillerie-Regiment 85	18 July 1943	—	—
Walter Gorn+	Heer	Major	Commander of the I./Schützen-Regiment 10	20 April 1941	Awarded 113th Oak Leaves 17 August 1942; 30th Swords 8 June 1943	—
Alfred Gorski	Heer	Unteroffizier	Group leader in the 4.(MG)/Grenadier-Regiment 576 (Note: According to Scherzer as group leader in the 4./Grenadier-Regiment 576.)	21 January 1945	—	—
Artur Gorski	Heer	Unteroffizier	Group leader in the 3./Grenadier-Regiment 30 (motorized)	28 November 1943	—	—
Ferdinand Gosewisch	Heer	Oberst of the Reserves	Commander of Artillerie-Regiment 362	4 July 1944	—	—
Heinz Gossow	Luftwaffe	Oberfeldwebel	Pilot in the 1./Jagdgeschwader 302 (Note: According to Scherzer on 24 October 1944 as pilot in the I./Jagdgeschwader 302.)	28 October 1944	—	—
Curt von Gottberg	Waffen-SS	SS-Gruppenführer and Generalleutnant of the Polizei	Leader of Kampfgruppe "von Gottberg"	30 June 1944	—	
Heinrich Gottke	Waffen-SS	SS-Unterscharführer	Vorgeschobener Beobachter (forward observer) in the 3./SS-Flak-Abteilung 17 "Götz von Berlichingen" (Note: According to Scherzer as Vorgeschobener Beobachter (forward observer) in the 3./SS-Flak-Abteilung 17.)	27 December 1944	—	—
Rainer Gottstein	Waffen-SS	SS-Obersturmbannführer	Commander Sipo and SD Budapest and leader of a Kampfgruppe (Note: According to Scherzer as commander Sipo and SD Budapest.)	6 February 1945	—	—
Heinz Graber	Luftwaffe	Leutnant	Staffelführer of the 7./Sturzkampfgeschwader 2 "Immelmann"	19 June 1942	—	—
Siegfried Grabert+	Heer	Oberleutnant of the Reserves (Note: According to Scherzer as Leutnant zur Verwendung (for disposition) and leader of a special commando in the 8./Bau-Lehr-Bataillon "Brandenburg" z.b.V. 800.)	Leader of a special commando in the Bau-Lehr-Bataillon z.b.V. 800 "Brandenburg"	10 June 1941	Awarded 320th Oak Leaves 6 November 1943	
Walter Grabmann	Luftwaffe	Oberstleutnant	Geschwaderkommodore of Zerstörergeschwader 76	14 September 1940	—	
Josef Grabowski	Heer	Leutnant	Leader of the 4./Panzergrenadier-Regiment 110	18 January 1944	—	—
Hans Gradl	Heer	Major	Commander of the I./Panzer-Regiment 39	15 November 1941	—	—
Heinz Graeber	Luftwaffe	Oberfeldwebel	Radio operator in the 15./Kampfgeschwader 2	30 September 1943	—	—
Viktor-Eberhard Gräbner	Waffen-SS	SS-Hauptsturmführer of the Reserves	Commander of SS-Panzer-Aufklärungs-Abteilung 9 "Hohenstaufen" (Note: According to Scherzer as commander of SS-Panzer-Aufklärungs-Abteilung 9.)	23 August 1944	Killed in Action 18 September 1944	—
Werner Gräbner	Heer	Oberfeldwebel	Zugführer (platoon leader) in the 4./Füsilier-Regiment 22 (Note: According to Scherzer as Zugführer (platoon leader) in the Stabskompanie./Füsilier-Regiment 22.)	30 September 1944	—	—
Heinz Graebsch	Heer	Hauptmann of the Reserves	Chief of the 14.(Panzerjäger)/Grenadier-Regiment 7 (Note: According to Scherzer as chief of the 14./Grenadier-Regiment 7.)	20 July 1944*	Killed in action 14 July 1944	—
Hans Graefe	Luftwaffe	Fahnenjunker-Oberfeldwebel	Observer in the 2.(H)/Aufklärungs-Gruppe 6 (Note: According to Scherzer on 6 December 1944 as oberserver in the 2./Nahaufklärungsgruppe 6.)	26 December 1944	—	—
Fritz-Hubert Gräser+	Heer	Oberst	Commander of Infanterie-Regiment 29 (motorized)	19 July 1940	Awarded 517th Oak Leaves 26 June 1944 (154th) Swords 8 May 1945? (Note: Fritz-Hubert Gräser's nomination by the troop was received by the Heerespersonalamt (HPA—Army Personnel Office) on 29 April 1945. General Ernst Maisel noted: "I approve the nomination! 30 April". The nomination list for the higher grades of the Knight's Cross of the Iron Cross only notes the nomination entry date as 29 April 1945. There is no indication that the award was granted. The paperwork was not finalized by the end of the war. The Association of Knight's Cross Recipients (AKCR) claims that the award was presented in accordance with the Dönitz-decree. This is illegal according to the Deutsche Dienststelle (WASt) and lacks legal justification. The sequential number "154" and presentation date were assigned by the AKCR.)	—
Walther Graeßner	Heer	Generalleutnant	Commander of the 298. Infanterie-Division	27 October 1941	—	
Erich Grätz	Waffen-SS	SS-Hauptsturmführer	Chief of the 18.(Panzerjäger)/SS-Panzergrenadier-Regiment 1 "Leibstandarte SS Adolf Hitler" (Note: According to Scherzer as chief of the 18./SS-Panzergrenadier-Regiment 1 "Leibstandarte SS Adolf Hitler".)	14 May 1944	—	—
Alois Graf	Heer	Oberstleutnant	Commander of Grenadier-Regiment 1082	30 April 1945*	Killed in action 8 April 1945	—
Hermann Graf+	Luftwaffe	Leutnant of the Reserves	Pilot in the 9./Jagdgeschwader 52	24 January 1942	Awarded 93rd Oak Leaves 17 May 1942; 11th Swords 19 May 1942; 5th Diamonds 16 September 1942 (Note: According to Scherzer Swords awarded on 18 May 1944.)	
Rudolf Graf	Luftwaffe	Oberleutnant	Chief of the 1./Flak-Regiment (motorized) "General Göring"	6 October 1941	—	—
Karl von Graffen	Heer	Generalmajor	Leader of the 58. Infanterie-Division	13 August 1942	—	
Friedrich Grammel	Heer	Leutnant (Note: According to Scherzer as Leutnant of the Reserves.)	Leader of the 3./Grenadier-Regiment 544	4 May 1944*	Killed in action 17 February 1944	—
Bruno Granitza	Heer	Hauptmann	Chief of the 12./Artillerie-Regiment 329	21 September 1944	—	—
Georg Gransee	Heer	Feldwebel	Zugführer (platoon leader) in the 7./Panzer-Regiment 31	19 September 1943	—	—
Simon Grascher	Waffen-SS	SS-Unterscharführer	Platoon troop leader in the 9./SS-Panzergrenadier-Regiment 4 "Der Führer" (Note: According to Scherzer as platoon troop leader in the 9./SS-Panzergrenadier-Regiment "Der Führer".)	14 August 1943*	Killed in action 14 July 1943	—
Martin Grase+	Heer	Oberst	Commander of Infanterie-Regiment 1	18 October 1941	Awarded 248th Oak Leaves 23 May 1943	—
Anton Grasel (Note: According to Scherzer name is spelled Anton Grassl.)	Heer	Oberwachtmeister	Zugführer (platoon leader) in a leichte Flak-Abteilung (motorized) (Note: According to Scherzer as Zugführer (platoon leader) in 1./leichte Flak-Abteilung 75 (self motorized).)	24 October 1944*	Killed in action 16 September 1944	—
Walter Grasemann	Luftwaffe	Oberleutnant	Staffelkapitän of the 9./Kampfgeschwader 27 "Boelcke"	9 October 1943	—	—
Fritz Grassau	Heer	Hauptmann	Commander of the II./Infanterie-Regiment 188	16 July 1941	—	—
Anton Grasser+	Heer	Oberstleutnant	Commander of Infanterie-Regiment 119	16 June 1940	Awarded 344th Oak Leaves 5 December 1943	—
Hartmann Grasser+	Luftwaffe	Oberleutnant	Pilot in the II./Jagdgeschwader 51 (Note: According to Scherzer as pilot in the Stab/Jagdgeschwader 51.)	4 September 1941	Awarded 288th Oak Leaves 31 August 1943	—
Rudolf Grasser	Heer	Feldwebel	Zugführer (platoon leader) in the 8./Grenadier-Regiment 191	29 November 1944	—	—
Dietrich Graßmann	Luftwaffe	Oberleutnant	Staffelkapitän of the 1./Kampfgeschwader 4 "General Wever"	12 March 1945	—	—
Josef Graßmann	Heer	Major	Commander of the II./Grenadier-Regiment 326	9 November 1942	—	—
Franz Graßmel+	Luftwaffe	Major	Commander of the III./Fallschirmjäger-Regiment 4	8 April 1944	Awarded (868th) Oak Leaves 8 May 1945? (Note: The original nomination was not retained. The Oberbefehlshaber Nordwest (OB Nordwest) had sent the nomination to the Oberkommando der Luftwaffe/Auszeichnung und Disziplin (OKL/AuD—Air Force High Command/Award and Discipline). The accompanying letter is presented by Franz Thomas. Franz Thomas is author of Die Ritterkreuzträger der Deutschen Wehrmacht 1939–1945, Teil II Die Ritterkreuzträger der Fallschirmjäger, Osnabrück 1986, page 88. No further information prevailed. A presentation cannot be verified. The Order Commission of the Association of Knight's Cross Recipients (AKCR) processed this case in 1974 and decided: 868th Oak Leaves, 8 May 1945. According to the AKCR the award was present in accordance with the Dönitz-decree. This is illegal according to the Deutsche Dienststelle (WASt) and lacks legal justification. The sequential number "868" and date were assigned by the AKCR. Graßmel is listed by the OB Nordwest for the "Nomination for the presentation of war awards" in May 1945. This list, which was to be presented to Karl Dönitz, holds 12 names. These nominations had all been submitted by the OB Nordwest via the command chain and must be considered not finalized. Dönitz has never signed this list and most likely has never seen this list. Franz Graßmel was a member of the AKCR.)	—
Berthold Graßmuck	Luftwaffe	Oberfeldwebel	Pilot in the 2./Jagdgeschwader 52 (Note: According to Scherzer as pilot in the 1./Jagdgeschwader 52.)	19 September 1942	—	—
Karl Gratz	Luftwaffe	Unteroffizier	Pilot in the 8./Jagdgeschwader 52	1 July 1942	—	—
Reinhard Graubner	Luftwaffe	Hauptmann	Gruppenkommandeur of the II./Kampfgeschwader 4 "General Wever"	3 September 1943	—	—
Ulrich Grauert	Luftwaffe	General der Flieger	Commanding general of the I. Fliegerkorps	29 May 1940	—	—
August Grauting	Heer	Feldwebel	Zugführer (platoon leader) in Infanterie-Regiment 16	29 May 1940	—	—
Sigmund-Ulrich Freiherr von Gravenreuth+	Luftwaffe	Oberleutnant	Pilot in the 1./Kampfgeschwader 30	24 November 1940	Awarded 692nd Oak Leaves 9 January 1945	
Gerhard Grebarsche	Waffen-SS	SS-Hauptscharführer	Zugführer (platoon leader) in the 3./SS-Panzergrenadier-Regiment 2 "Leibstandarte SS Adolf Hitler"	24 January 1944	—	—
Franz Greck	Heer	Unteroffizier	Company troop leader in the 4./Panzer-Aufklärungs-Abteilung 8	5 February 1945	—	—
Otto Greese	Heer	Obergefreiter	1st machine gunner in the 6./Grenadier-Regiment 487 (Note: According to Scherzer as machine gunner in the 6./Grenadier-Regiment 487.)	24 November 1943*	Killed in action 2 November 1943	—
Heinz Grehl	Heer	Oberleutnant of the Reserves	Company leader in Festungs-Grenadier-Regiment "Mohr" in fortress Breslau (Note: According to Scherzer as company leader in Regiment "Mohr" in fortress Breslau.)	30 April 1945	—	—
Hans von Greiffenberg	Heer	Generalmajor	Chief of the general staff of the 12. Armee	18 May 1941	—	
Alfred Greim	Heer	Oberstleutnant (Note: According to Scherzer as Major and commander of the II./Infanterie-Regiment (motorized) "Großdeutschland".)	Commander of the II./Infanterie-Regiment 1 "Großdeutschland"	4 June 1942	—	
Robert Ritter von Greim+	Luftwaffe	Generalleutnant	Commanding general of the V. Fliegerkorps	24 June 1940	Awarded 216th Oak Leaves 2 April 1943; 92nd Swords 28 August 1944 (Note: According to Scherzer Swords awarded on 27 August 1944.)	
Andreas Greiner	Heer	Oberjäger	Zugführer (platoon leader) in the 8./Jäger-Regiment 75	6 February 1944	—	—
Erwin Greiner	Heer	Major	Leader of Grenadier-Regiment 307	29 November 1944	—	—
Heinz Greiner+	Heer	Oberst	Commander of Infanterie-Regiment 499	22 September 1941	Awarded 572nd Oak Leaves 5 September 1944	—
Hermann Greiner+	Luftwaffe	Oberleutnant	Staffelkapitän of the 11./Nachtjagdgeschwader 1	27 July 1944	Awarded 840th Oak Leaves 17 April 1945	—
Hans Greiter	Heer	Unteroffizier	Messenger squadron leader in the I./Grenadier-Regiment 165	13 January 1945	—	—
Gerhard Grenzel	Luftwaffe	Unteroffizier	Pilot in the 2./Sturzkampfgeschwader 1 (Note: According to Scherzer as pilot in the I./Sturzkampfgeschwader 1.)	8 May 1940	—	—
Horst Gresiak	Waffen-SS	SS-Obersturmführer	Leader of the 7./SS-Panzer-Regiment 2 "Das Reich" (Note: According to Scherzer as leader of the 7./SS-Panzer-Regiment 2.)	25 January 1945	—	—
Josef Gretschmann	Heer	Oberfeldwebel	Zugführer (platoon leader) in the 6./Schützen-Regiment 40	11 August 1941	—	—
Carl-Heinz Greve	Luftwaffe	Leutnant	Pilot in the 3./Kampfgruppe 606 (Note: According to Scherzer as pilot in the 3./Küstenflieger-Gruppe 606.)	7 October 1942	—	—
Prof. Dr. med.-dent. Karl Greve	Heer	Hauptmann of the Reserves zur Verwendung (for disposition)	Commander of the I./Jäger-Regiment 49	18 May 1942	—	—
Josef Grewe	Luftwaffe	Oberfeldwebel	Pilot in the 9./Schlachtgeschwader 77	20 July 1944	—	—
Osmar Griebel	Luftwaffe	Feldwebel	Pilot in the 2./Sturzkampfgeschwader 77	5 December 1943	—	—
Willy Grieme	Waffen-SS	SS-Obersturmführer of the Reserves	Leader of the 6./SS-Panzergrenadier-Regiment 4 "Der Führer" (Note: According to Scherzer as leader of the 6./SS-Panzergrenadier-Regiment "Der Führer".)	17 September 1943	—	—
Franz Griesbach+	Heer	Major	Commander of the I./Infanterie-Regiment 391	14 March 1942	Awarded 242nd Oak Leaves 17 May 1943; 53rd Swords 6 March 1944	
Bernhard Griese	Waffen-SS	SS-Sturmbannführer and Major of the Schupo	Commander of SS-Polizei-Schützen-Bataillon 323	3 May 1942	—	
Max Grieser	Heer	Leutnant	Leader of the 2./Panzergrenadier-Regiment 114	14 August 1944*	Killed in action 5 August 1944	—
Fritz Grieshammer	Luftwaffe	Generalmajor	Commander of the 24. Flak-Division	12 April 1945	—	—
Herbert Griesinger	Heer	Oberjäger	Group leader in Jäger-Regiment 56	2 September 1944	—	—
Hans-Christoph Grießbauer	Heer	Rittmeister of the Reserves	Chief of the 4./Füsilier-Bataillon 58 (Note: According to Scherzer as chief of the 4./Division-Füsilier-Bataillon (AA) 58.)	14 November 1943	—	—
Heinz Grimberg	Heer	Hauptmann	Commander of Panzer-Pionier-Bataillon 19	14 April 1945	—	—
Heinz Grimm	Luftwaffe	Leutnant	Pilot in the IV./Nachtjagdgeschwader 1 (Note: According to Scherzer as pilot in the Stab IV./Nachtjagdgeschwader 1.)	5 February 1944*	Died of wounds 13 October 1943	—
Johannes Grimminger+	Heer	Hauptmann of the Reserves	Leader of Panzergrenadier-Feld-Ersatz-Bataillon 25	23 August 1944	Awarded 776th Oak Leaves 11 March 1945	—
Alfred Grislawski+	Luftwaffe	Feldwebel	Pilot in the 9./Jagdgeschwader 52	1 July 1942	Awarded 446th Oak Leaves 11 April 1944	—
Werner Grodde	Heer	Hauptmann	Commander of the II./Artillerie-Regiment 13 (L)	6 April 1944	—	—
Karl-Albrecht von Groddeck	Heer	Oberst	Commander of Infanterie-Regiment 120 (motorized)	8 September 1941	—	—
Manfred Groebe	Heer	Leutnant (Note: According to Scherzer as Leutnant of the Reserves.)	Pioneer Zugführer (platoon leader) in the Stabskompanie/Grenadier-Regiment 278	17 March 1945	—	—
Kurt Gröschke+	Luftwaffe	Major	Commander of the II./Fallschirmjäger-Regiment 1	9 June 1944	Awarded 693rd Oak Leaves 9 January 1945	
Ludwig Grözinger	Luftwaffe	Hauptmann	Staffelkapitän of the 3./Kampfgeschwader 53 "Legion Condor"	25 November 1942	—	—
Walter Grohe	Heer	Hauptmann of the Reserves	Leader of the I./Panzer-Regiment 35	22 October 1944	—	—
Franz Grohmann	Waffen-SS	SS-Obersturmführer	Chief of the 1./SS-Panzergrenadier-Regiment 3 "Deutschland"	23 August 1944	—	—
Helmut Grollmus	Luftwaffe	Leutnant	Pilot in the II./Jagdgeschwader 54 (Note: According to Scherzer as pilot in the 4./Jagdgeschwader 54.)	6 October 1944*	Killed in action 19 June 1944	—
Gustav Gromeike (Note: According to Scherzer name is spelled Gustav Gromeik.)	Heer	Obergefreiter	In the 2./Pionier-Bataillon 1	19 June 1942	—	—
Fritz Gromotka	Luftwaffe	Leutnant (Note: According to Scherzer as Leutnant of the Reserves.)	Staffelkapitän of the 9./Jagdgeschwader 27	28 January 1945	—	—
Josef Grons	Luftwaffe	Major	Gruppenkommandeur of the I./Transportgeschwader 2	20 April 1944	—	—
Heinz Gropp? (Note: No evidence of the award can be found in the German Federal Archives. According to Walther-Peer Fellgiebel the award was presented by SS-Oberstgruppenführer Sepp Dietrich, which would make it an unlawful presentation. Fellgiebel's sources are Hermann Buch, the former IIa (personnel administration) of the 2. SS-Division "Das Reich", and Wilhelm Kment, the adjutant of Heinrich Himmler and liaison officer to the Heerespersonalamt (HPA—Army Staff Office). According to Buch—note from 25 June 2005—he has nothing to do with this presentation. And Kment cannot be the source since Buch stated that Kment died in the early 1970s. If indeed Kment was the source then Von Seemen would have listed Heinz Gropp in either the first or second edition of his book, which is not the case. The source thus remains uncertain. Krätschmer lists Gropp in his third edition with a date of 1 May 1945 without stating a source as well. Fellgiebel dated the award on 6 May 1945. He may have done this to justify this as a Dietrich award.)	Waffen-SS	SS-Obersturmführer of the Reserves	Leader of the 2./SS-Flak-Abteilung 9 "Hohenstaufen"	6 May 1945	—	— —
Karl Gros	Heer	Oberfeldwebel	Zugführer (platoon leader) in the 1./Panzer-Regiment 2	14 December 1943	—	—
Erhard Grosan? (Note: Erhard Grosan's nomination by the Außenstelle of the Heerespersonalamt (HPA/A—Branch of the Army Staff Office) was ready for signature by the end of the war. According to the Association of Knight's Cross Recipients (AKCR) the award was presented in accordance with the Dönitz-decree. This is illegal according to the Deutsche Dienststelle (WASt) and lacks legal justification. The presentation date is an assumption of the AKCR.)	Heer	Oberst	Commander of Kampfgruppe "Grosan" and tactics teacher at the Panzer-Truppenschule Bergen	9 May 1945	—	—
Johann Groscheck	Heer	Oberfeldwebel	Leader of rider platoon in the Stabskompanie/Grenadier-Regiment 422	21 January 1945	—	—
Alfred Groß? (Note: The information regarding the presentation of the Knight's Cross to Alfred Groß originally came from Ernst Obermaier and was given to Walther-Peer Fellgiebel, who accepted this. Fellgiebel included all Luftwaffe presentations without changes because the Luftwaffe presentations at the end of the war could not be verified. Scherzer states that he received information from an aviation historian, who has access to the original 1945 files of Jagdgeschwader 26 (JG 26), that, "Leutnant Alfred Groß, 5./JG 26 was not a Staffelführer of the 5. Staffel, nor a recipient of the Knight's Cross." Alfred Groß is listed by Obermaier. Von Seemen lists him with a vague presentation date of April 1945.)	Luftwaffe	Leutnant	Staffelführer of the 5./Jagdgeschwader 26 "Schlageter"	20 April 1945	—	—
Helmut Groß	Heer	Major	Commander of Divisions-Füsilier-Bataillon 129	31 August 1943	—	—
Martin Groß	Waffen-SS	SS-Sturmbannführer	Commander of the II./SS-Panzer-Regiment 1 "Leibstandarte SS Adolf Hitler" (Note: According to Scherzer as commander of the II./SS-Panzer-Regiment "Leibstandarte SS Adolf Hitler".)	22 July 1943	—	
Gert Grosse	Heer	Major	Commander of the II./Grenadier-Regiment 529	3 January 1944	—	—
Hans Grossendorfer	Luftwaffe	Oberleutnant	Observer in the 7./Kampfgeschwader 53 "Legion Condor"	26 March 1944*	Killed on active service 20 November 1943	—
Georg Großjohann	Heer	Major	Leader of Grenadier-Regiment 308	26 December 1944	—	—
Friedrich-Karl Großkreutz	Heer	Major	Commander of Sturmgeschütz-Abteilung 244	22 November 1943	—	—
Horst Großmann+	Heer	Oberst	Commander of Infanterie-Regiment 84	23 August 1941	Awarded 292nd Oak Leaves 4 September 1943	—
Hugo Großmann	Heer	Feldwebel	Deputy leader of the 3./Grenadier-Regiment 252	26 March 1944*	Died of wounds 29 January 1944	—
Alfred Großrock	Waffen-SS	SS-Untersturmführer	Zugführer (platoon leader) in the 6./SS-Panzer-Regiment 5 "Wiking" (Note: According to Scherzer as Zugführer (platoon leader) in the 6./SS-Panzer-Regiment 5.)	12 August 1944	—	—
Ernst-Albert Grote	Heer	Major (Note: According to Scherzer as Major of the Reserves.)	Leader of Grenadier-Regiment 12	11 March 1945	—	—
Horst Freiherr Grote	Luftwaffe	Oberleutnant	Staffelkapitän of the 4.(S)/Lehrgeschwader 2	21 July 1940	—	—
Erich Groth	Luftwaffe	Hauptmann	Gruppenkommandeur of the II./Zerstörergeschwader 76	1 October 1940	—	
Heinz Groth? (Note: Heinz Groth's nomination by the troop was received by the Heerespersonalamt (HPA—Army Staff Office) on 23 March 1945. The book "Verliehene Ritterkreuze" (Awarded Knight Crosses) contains a note (presumably by Joachim Domaschk): "Knight's Cross no, Honour Roll". The file card states: "rejected" and "unfinished (Honour Roll)? ". The presentation date was assigned by Walther-Peer Fellgiebel.)	Heer	Major of the Reserves	Division adjutant of the 1. Volks-Gebirgs-Division and leader of Gebirgsjäger-Regiment 99	9 May 1945	—	—
Hermann Grothaus	Heer	Oberleutnant	Chief of the 11./Artillerie-Regiment 389	10 September 1944	—	—
Siegfried Grotheer	Heer	Oberstleutnant	Commander of Grenadier-Regiment 464	6 November 1943	—	—
Helmut Gruber	Heer	Oberleutnant of the Reserves	Adjutant in the II./Panzergrenadier-Regiment 125	15 January 1943	—	—
Rupert Gruber	Heer	Major	Commander of Sturmgeschütz-Abteilung 209	14 August 1943	—	
Adolf Grubinger	Heer	Oberjäger	Machine gun leader in the 9./Jäger-Regiment 227	28 February 1945	—	—
Peter Grübl	Heer	Obergefreiter	Group leader in the 11./Gebirgsjäger-Regiment 98	20 December 1941	—	—
Werner Grün	Heer	Hauptmann	Leader of the I./Panzer-Regiment 5	8 February 1943	—	—
Hans Grünberg	Luftwaffe	Leutnant	Pilot in the 5./Jagdgeschwader 3 "Udet"	9 June 1944	—	—
Georg Grüner+	Heer	Oberleutnant	Chief of the 1./Panzer-Regiment 33 "Prinz Eugen" (Note: According to Scherzer on 23 November 1941 as chief of the 1./Panzer-Regiment 33.)	25 November 1941	Awarded 436th Oak Leaves 26 March 1944	
Anton Grünert	Heer	Oberleutnant of the Reserves	Chief of the 3./Sturmgeschütz-Abteilung 201	15 March 1943	—	—
Richard Grünert+	Heer	Oberleutnant of the Reserves	Leader of the 3./Kradschützen-Bataillon 7	14 October 1941 (Note: According to Scherzer on 14 December 1941.)	Awarded 244th Oak Leaves 17 May 1943	—
Georg Grünewald	Luftwaffe	Oberfeldwebel (Note: According to Scherzer as Fahnenjunker-Oberfeldwebel and commander of a Sturmgeschütz in the 1./Fallschirmjäger-Sturmgeschütz-Brigade 12.)	Zugführer (platoon leader) in the 1./Fallschirmjäger-Sturmgeschütz-Brigade 12	29 October 1944	—	—
Rudolf Grünner	Waffen-SS	SS-Unterscharführer	Group leader in Regiment "Mohr" in the fortress Breslau	10 March 1945	—	—
Harry Grünwald	Heer	Oberleutnant	Chief of the 2./Artillerie-Regiment 18 (motorized)	6 February 1944	—	—
Wilhelm Grünwaldt	Heer	Hauptmann of the Reserves	Commander of the I./Panzergrenadier-Regiment 126	17 September 1944	—	—
Herbert Gruhl	Heer	Hauptmann	Chief of the 11./Grenadier-Regiment 133	5 April 1944	—	—
Otto Grumbt	Heer	Hauptmann	Commander of the II./Panzergrenadier-Regiment 111	28 October 1944	—	—
Ernst Grunau	Heer	Oberleutnant	Leader of the Begleitkompanie of the 14. Panzer-Division (Note: According to Scherzer as leader of the Division-Begleitkompanie/14. Panzer-Division.)	4 October 1944	—	—
Julius Grund	Heer	Hauptmann	Commander of the I./Gebirgsjäger-Regiment 138	30 October 1943	—	—
Erich Grundmann	Kriegsmarine	Kapitänleutnant (Ing.)	Fleet engineer in the 1. Räumbootflottille	31 May 1940	—	
Wilhelm Grunge	Heer	Obergefreiter	Group leader in the 4./Panzergrenadier-Regiment 93	3 July 1944	—	—
Werner Grunhold	Luftwaffe	Unteroffizier	Company troop leader in the 3./Fallschirm-Panzergrenadier-Regiment 2 "Hermann Göring"	30 November 1944	—	—
Horst Grunwald	Heer	Feldwebel	Zugführer (platoon leader) in the 4./Grenadier-Regiment 457	14 May 1944	—	—
Karl-Georg Gschwendtner	Luftwaffe	Oberfeldwebel	Pilot in the 7./Sturzkampfgeschwader 77	5 February 1944	—	—
Karl-Heinrich Gsell	Heer	Leutnant of the Reserves	Leader of the 2./Panzer-Regiment 35	23 February 1944	—	—
Josef Gsinn	Heer	Oberfeldwebel	Zugführer (platoon leader) in the 4./Hochgebirgsjäger-Bataillon 3	20 July 1944	—	—
Rudolf Guckenberger	Heer	Hauptmann	Commander of the II./Infanterie-Regiment 481	20 August 1942	—	—
Alfred Gudelius	Heer	Major	Commander of the II./Schützen-Regiment 14	10 February 1942	—	—
Heinz Guderian+	Heer	General der Panzertruppe	Commanding general of the XIX. Armeekorps	27 October 1939	Awarded 24th Oak Leaves 17 July 1941	
Heinz-Günther Guderian	Heer	Major im Generalstab (in the General Staff)	Ia (operations officer) of the 116. Panzer-Division	5 October 1944	—	—
Karl Gümbel	Heer	Oberst	Commander of Infanterie-Regiment 516	30 October 1941	—	—
Ludwig Gümbel	Heer	Oberst	Leader of Divisions-Gruppe "Gümbel" (Grenadier-Regiment 308) (Note: According to Scherzer as leader of Divisions-Gruppe 198.)	29 November 1944	—	—
Wilhelm Günter (Note: According to Scherzer name is spelled Wilhelm Günther who received the Knight's Cross of the Iron Cross as Zugführer (platoon leader) in the 13./Grenadier-Regiment 508.)	Heer	Feldwebel	Zugführer (platoon leader) in the 13.(IG)/Grenadier-Regiment 508	5 March 1945	—	—
Alfred Günther	Waffen-SS	SS-Oberscharführer	Zugführer (platoon leader) in the 1./SS-Sturmgeschütz-Abteilung 1 "Leibstandarte SS Adolf Hitler" (Note: According to Scherzer as Zugführer (platoon leader) in the SS-Sturmgeschütz-Abteilung "Leibstandarte SS Adolf Hitler".)	3 March 1943	—	
Heinrich-Albert Günther (Note: According to Scherzer name is spelled Heinrich-Albert Güntner.)	Luftwaffe	Hauptmann	Staffelkapitän of the 7./Kampfgeschwader 27 "Boelcke"	9 June 1944*	Killed in action 10 January 1944	—
Paul Günther	Luftwaffe	Fahnenjunker-Feldwebel	Pilot in the 9./Schlachtgeschwader 10	2 February 1945	—	—
Wilhelm Günther	Heer	Feldwebel	Zugführer (platoon leader) in the 8./Panzer-Regiment 2	18 December 1942	—	—
Reinhard Günzel+	Luftwaffe	Hauptmann	Gruppenkommandeur of the II./Kampfgeschwader 27 "Boelcke"	17 September 1941	Awarded 184th Oak Leaves 21 January 1943	—
Ernst Gürke	Luftwaffe	Major	Commander of the I./Flak-Regiment 43 (Note: According to Scherzer as commander of the I./Flak-Regiment (motorized) 43.)	3 November 1942	—	—
Martin Gürz	Waffen-SS	SS-Hauptsturmführer (Note: According to Scherzer as SS-Hauptsturmführer of the Reserves and leader of the III./SS-Freiwilligen-Panzergrenadier-Regiment 23 "Norge" (norw. Nr 1).)	Leader of the III./SS-Freiwilligen-Panzergrenadier-Regiment 23 "Norge"	23 October 1944*	Killed in action 26 September 1944	—
Hans Gütschow	Heer	Leutnant of the Reserves	Company leader in the I./Infanterie-Regiment 545	25 October 1942	—	—
Alois Gugganig	Heer	Feldwebel	Zugführer (platoon leader) in the 12./Gebirgsjäger-Regiment 91	3 April 1943	—	—
Friedrich Guggenberger+	Kriegsmarine	Kapitänleutnant	Commander of U-81	10 December 1941	Awarded 171st Oak Leaves 8 January 1943	
Paul Guhl	Waffen-SS	SS-Hauptsturmführer	Leader of the III.(gepanzert)/SS-Panzergrenadier-Regiment 2 "Leibstandarte SS Adolf Hitler"	4 June 1944	—	—
Hans Guhr	Heer	Oberleutnant	Regiments adjutant in Infanterie-Regiment 513 (Note: According to Scherzer as adjutant in Infanterie-Regiment 513.)	10 September 1942	—	—
Heinz Guhrke	Kriegsmarine	Oberleutnant zur See of the Reserves	Commander of Torpedoboot TA20	5 November 1944*	Killed in action 31 October 1944	—
Günther Gumprich	Kriegsmarine	Kapitän zur See	Commander of auxiliary cruiser "Thor" (HSK-4)	31 December 1942	—	—
Ulrich Gunzert	Heer	Oberleutnant	Chief of the 3./Pionier-Bataillon 258	20 December 1941	—	—
Paul Gurran	Heer	Oberst	Commander of Infanterie-Regiment 506	12 September 1941	—	—
Ernst Guschker	Heer	Hauptmann	Leader of the II./Grenadier-Regiment 587	3 August 1943*	Died of wounds 13 February 1943	—
Werner Gust+	Heer	Hauptmann	Commander of the III./Grenadier-Regiment 477	7 February 1944	Awarded 624th Oak Leaves 18 October 1944	—
Helmut Gutheit	Heer	Leutnant of the Reserves	Leader of Jagdpanzer-Kompanie 1011	17 April 1945	—	—
[Dr.] Gerhard Gutmacher	Heer	Hauptmann	Leader of the I./Grenadier-Regiment 178	14 January 1945	—	—
Heinz Gutmann	Luftwaffe	Oberleutnant	Staffelführer of the 3./Kampfgeschwader 53 "Legion Condor"	5 April 1944	—	—
Joachim Gutmann	Heer	Oberstleutnant	Leader of Panzergrenadier-Regiment 11	18 September 1942	—	—
Erwin Gutzmann	Luftwaffe	Feldwebel	Pilot in the II./Schlachtgeschwader 2 "Immelmann"	26 March 1944	—	—
[Dr.] Hans Gutzmer	Luftwaffe	Hauptmann	Staffelkapitän of the 3./Kampfgeschwader 51	29 February 1944	—	—
Helmut Gutzschhahn	Heer	Hauptmann	Commander of the I./Panzergrenadier-Regiment 6	8 May 1943	—	—
August Györy	Luftwaffe	Oberleutnant	Pilot in the 4.(F)/Aufklärungs-Gruppe 122 (Note: According to Scherzer as pilot in the Aufklärungsstaffe 4.(F)/122.)	26 March 1944	—	—
Robert Gysae+	Kriegsmarine	Kapitänleutnant	Commander of U-98	31 December 1941	Awarded 250th Oak Leaves 31 May 1943	—
