= Anton Glasl =

Nazi Wehrmacht General

- Born: 13 February 1897; Freisling
- Died: 17 April 1965 (aged 68)
- Military career
- Allegiance: Nazi Germany
- Branch: Army
- Rank: Generalmajor
- Conflicts: World War II
- Awards: Knight's Cross of the Iron Cross

Anton Glasl (13 February 1897 – 17 April 1965) was a general in the Wehrmacht of Nazi Germany during World War II. He was a recipient of the Knight's Cross of the Iron Cross.

Glasl was born in Freising in Bavaria. He served in World War I and World War II reaching the rank of Generalmajor.

== Awards and decorations ==
- Knight's Cross of the Iron Cross on 11 October 1943 as Oberst and commander of Gebirgsjäger-Regiment 100
