= Fritz Grieshammer =

- Born: 30 March 1899; Rehau
- Died: 26 December 1956 (aged 57); Munich
- Military career
- Allegiance: German Empire (to 1918); Weimar Republic (to 1921); Nazi Germany
- Branch: Bavarian Army (1915–1918); Reichsheer (1919–1920); Luftwaffe (1935–1945)
- Service years: 1915–1920; 1935–1945
- Rank: Generalmajor
- Commands: 24th Flak Division
- Conflicts: World War I World War II: Battle of France; Defense of the Reich
- Awards: Knight's Cross of the Iron Cross
- Other work: Police officer

Fritz Grieshammer (30 March 1899 – 26 December 1956) was a highly decorated Generalmajor in the Luftwaffe during World War II. He was also a recipient of the Knight's Cross of the Iron Cross. The Knight's Cross of the Iron Cross, and its variants were the highest awards in the military and paramilitary forces of Nazi Germany during World War II. Grieshammer was captured by American troops in May 1945 and was held until June 1947.

== Awards and decorations ==
- Iron Cross (1914)
  - 2nd Class
  - 1st Class
- Honour Cross of the World War 1914/1918 (20 December 1934)
- Iron Cross (1939)
  - 2nd Class (19 January 1940)
  - 1st Class (16 December 1940)
- Anti-Aircraft Flak Battle Badge (16 December 1941)
- Knight's Cross of the Iron Cross on 12 April 1945 as Generalmajor and commander of 24. Flak-Division

Military offices
Preceded by None	Commander of 24th Flak Division; 23 December 1943 – 31 January 1945	Succeeded by None
