= Helmut Grollmus =

WWII Luftwaffe fighter ace

- Born: 8 January 1918; Lissa
- Died: 19 June 1944 (aged 26); Viipuri, Finland
- Cause of death: Killed in action
- Burial place: Helsinki-Hietaniemi Cemetery
- Military career
- Allegiance: Nazi Germany
- Branch: Luftwaffe
- Service years: 1942–1944
- Rank: Leutnant
- Unit: JG 54
- Commands: 2./JG 54
- Conflicts: World War II; Eastern Front
- Awards: German Cross; Knight's Cross of the Iron Cross

Helmut Grollmus (8 January 1918 – 19 June 1944) was a Luftwaffe fighter ace and recipient of the Knight's Cross of the Iron Cross during World War II. Helmuth Grollmus was credited with 75 aerial victories during World War II. In 1944 he was killed in action during a dogfight over Finland.

== Career ==
Grollmus was born on 8 January 1918 in Lissa, at the time in the Province of Posen, a province of the Kingdom of Prussia. Today Lissa is Leszno in western Poland. Following flight training, Grollmus was posted to the Ergänzungsjagdgruppe of Jagdgeschwader 54 (JG 54—54th Fighter Wing), a supplementary training group, in November 1941. On 9 March 1942, the Ergänzungsgruppe of JG 54 was disbanded and the pilots were transferred to I. Gruppe (1st group) of JG 54. In consequence, Grollmus was transferred to 2. Staffel of JG 54. As part of a Luftwaffe plan to exchange fighter units operating on the Eastern Front with fighter units flying on the Western Front, Grollmus was assigned to 12. Staffel of JG 54 in July 1943 which had been newly formed from elements of 7. Staffel of Jagdgeschwader 26 "Schlageter" (JG 26—26th Fighter Wing) and 4. Staffel of JG 54 and was subordinated to II. Gruppe of JG 54.

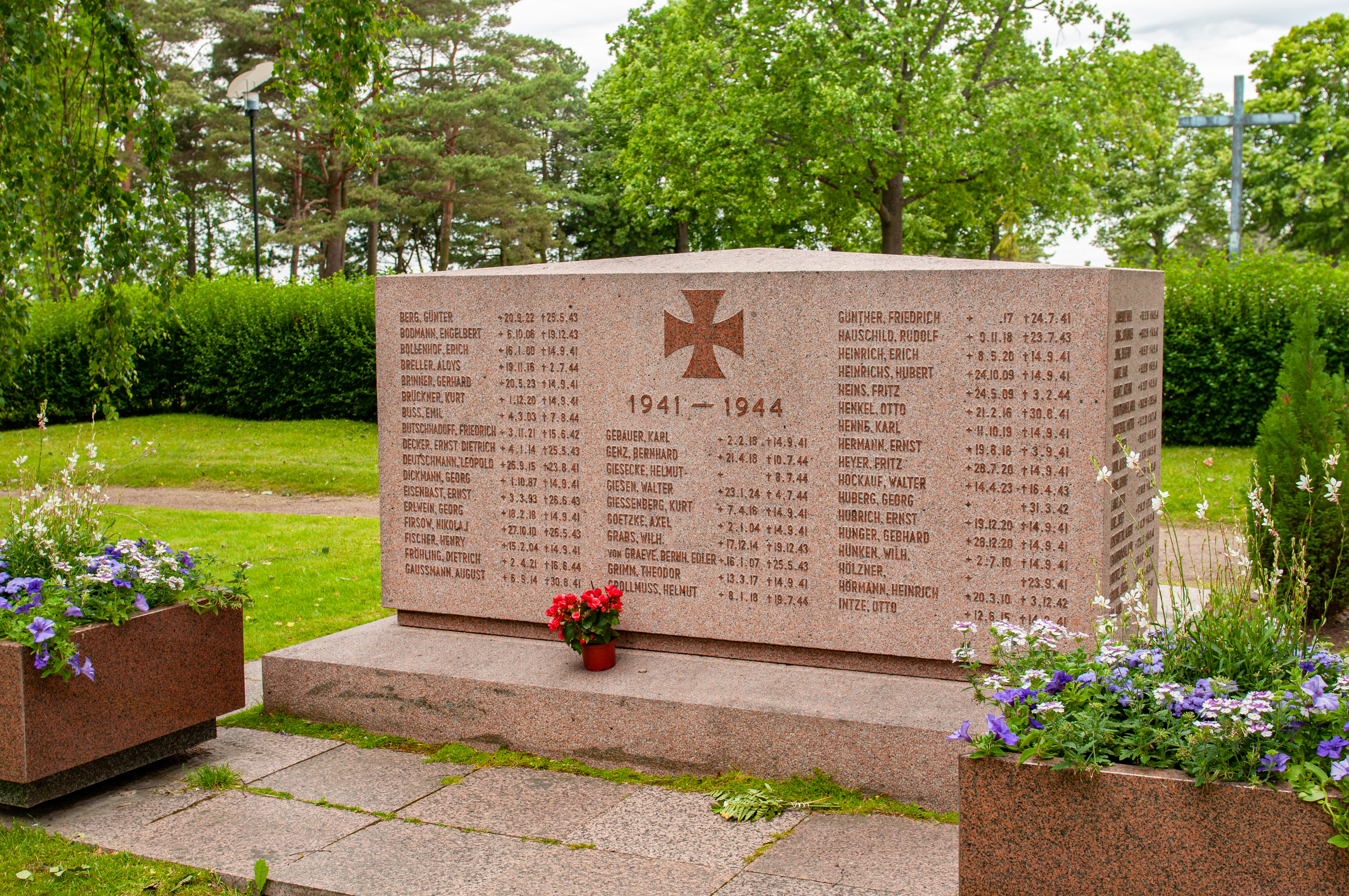
Hietaniemi Cemetery, Grollmus is listed at the bottom of the middle column.

Grollmus was killed in action over Viipuri, Finland 19 June 1944. He was shot down in his Focke-Wulf Fw 190 A-6 (Werknummer 470075—factory number) during aerial combat with Petlyakov Pe-2 bombers and Bell P-39 Airacobra fighters in a position 20 kilometers (12 miles) northeast of Viipuri. Grollmus parachuted out safely but was killed by ground fire. He is buried in the Helsinki-Hietaniemi Cemetery.

== Summary of career ==
=== Aerial victory claims ===
According to US historian David T. Zabecki, Grollmus was credited with 75 aerial victories. Spick also lists him with 75 aerial victories claimed in an unknown number missions on the Eastern Front. Heaton, Lewis, Olds and Schulze also list him with 75 aerial victories. Mathews and Foreman, authors of Luftwaffe Aces — Biographies and Victory Claims, researched the German Federal Archives and found records for 68 aerial victory claims, all of which claimed on the Eastern Front.

Victory claims were logged to a map-reference (PQ = Planquadrat), for example "PQ 10163". The Luftwaffe grid map (Jägermeldenetz) covered all of Europe, western Russia and North Africa and was composed of rectangles measuring 15 minutes of latitude by 30 minutes of longitude, an area of about 360 square miles (930 km^{2}). These sectors were then subdivided into 36 smaller units to give a location area 3 km × 4 km (1.9 mi × 2.5 mi) in size.

Chronicle of aerial victories
This and the ♠ (Ace of spades) indicates those aerial victories which made Grollmus an "ace-in-a-day", a term which designates a fighter pilot who has shot down five or more airplanes in a single day. This and the ? (question mark) indicates information discrepancies listed by Prien, Stemmer, Rodeike, Balke, Bock, Mathews and Foreman.
Claim	Date	Time	Type	Location	Claim	Date	Time	Type	Location
– 1. Staffel of Ergänzungsgruppe/Jagdgeschwader 54 – Eastern Front — 6 December 1941 – 9 March 1942
1	28 January 1942? (Note: According to Mathews and Foreman, this claim is dated 28 January 1943.)	09:42	I-18 (MiG-1)	southwest of Malaya Vishera	2? (Note: This claim is not listed by Mathews and Foreman.)	5 February 1942	08:50	I-18 (MiG-1)	Malaya Vishera
– 2. Staffel of Jagdgeschwader 54 – Eastern Front — 1 May 1942 – 3 February 1943
3	21 July 1942? (Note: According to Mathews and Foreman, this claim is dated 21 July 1943.)	19:09	MiG-3		5	15 January 1943	13:50	Il-2	PQ 10163 southwest of Vishera
4	23 July 1942? (Note: According to Mathews and Foreman, this claim is dated 23 July 1943.)	08:05	MiG-3						
– 2. Staffel of Jagdgeschwader 54 – Eastern Front — 1 May – 30 June 1943
6	24 February 1943	11:30	LaGG-3	PQ 36 Ost 10162	7	28 February 1943	15:40	Pe-2	PQ 26 Ost 90164 southeast of Shlisselburg
– 12. Staffel of Jagdgeschwader 54 – Eastern Front — 1 July – 31 December 1943
8	12 July 1943	14:44	Il-2	PQ 35 Ost 64683 southeast of Shlisselburg	26	1 September 1943	18:17	Il-2? (Note: According to Mathews and Foreman claimed as a Mikoyan-Gurevich MiG-3.)	PQ 35 Ost 35363; 15 km (9.3 mi) northeast of Yelnya
9	13 July 1943	05:27	Yak-7	PQ 35 Ost 64894; 10 km (6.2 mi) southwest of Lomonosov	27	7 October 1943	07:23	La-5	southwest of Oster
10	13 July 1943	10:45	Il-2	PQ 35 Ost 63256	28	11 October 1943	12:32	Yak-9	east of the Dnieper
11	13 July 1943	10:48	Il-2	PQ 35 Ost 63283; 25 km (16 mi) southeast of Mtsensk	29	13 October 1943	05:56	Yak-9	southeast of Kiev
12	1 August 1943	07:16? (Note: According to Mathews and Foreman claimed at 07:06.)	LaGG-3	PQ 36 Ost 10143 south of Shlisselburg	30	13 October 1943	06:07	Yak-9	southeast of Kiev
13	2 August 1943	10:13	LaGG-3	PQ 36 Ost 10322; 10 km (6.2 mi) southeast of Mga	31	21 October 1943	09:48	Il-2	eastern bank of the Dnieper
14	3 August 1943	14:02	Yak-7	PQ 36 Ost 10272; 25 km (16 mi) east-southeast of Mga	32	21 October 1943	09:56	Pe-2	eastern bank of the Dnieper
15	8 August 1943	17:10	Yak-7	PQ 35 Ost 5336	33	21 October 1943	15:20	La-5	west-northwest of Rshitschtschew
16	13 August 1943	16:31? (Note: According to Mathews and Foreman claimed at 18:31.)	Il-2	PQ 35 Ost 44891; 10 km (6.2 mi) southwest of Karachev	34	24 October 1943	14:56	La-5	northeast of Kanev
17	14 August 1943	05:05	La-5	PQ 35 Ost 4575	35	3 November 1943	14:56	Yak-9	south of Ljutesh
18	16 August 1943	13:15? (Note: According to Mathews and Foreman claimed at 13:18.)	Yak-9	PQ 35 Ost 45553; 15 km (9.3 mi) north-northeast of Kirov	36	5 November 1943	14:29	Il-2	southeastern suburbs of Kiev
19	19 August 1943	12:47	La-5	PQ 35 Ost 43863; 25 km (16 mi) east-southeast of Sevsk	37	5 November 1943	14:41	Il-2	southern suburbs of Kiev
20	23 August 1943	13:32	Pe-2	PQ 35 Ost 53413; 30 km (19 mi) northeast of Dmitrowsk	38	22 November 1943	14:19	Il-2	east of Zhytomyr
21	24 August 1943	07:06	DB-3	PQ 35 Ost 44452	39	22 November 1943	14:23	Yak-9	east of Zhytomyr
22	24 August 1943	07:12	LaGG-3	PQ 35 Ost 44532; 15 km (9.3 mi) south of Datrovo	40	29 November 1943	06:54	La-5	west of Kornin
23	26 August 1943	16:05	Pe-2	PQ 35 Ost 43794; 15 km (9.3 mi) south-southwest of Sevsk	41	29 November 1943	06:55	La-5	west of Kornin
24	26 August 1943	16:10	LaGG-3	PQ 35 Ost 43782; 15 km (9.3 mi) south-southwest of Sevsk	42	29 November 1943	10:38	Il-2	PQ 25 Ost 91531; 30 km (19 mi) north of Zelenogorsk
25	31 August 1943	10:05	Yak-9	PQ 35 Ost 25463; 20 km (12 mi) west of Yelnya	43	13 December 1943	12:34	Il-2	northeast of Hrebinky
– 12. Staffel of Jagdgeschwader 54 – Eastern Front — 1 January – 27 February 1944
44	24 January 1944	10:26	La-5	PQ 26 Ost 80694; 35 km (22 mi) east-southeast of Narva	47	13 February 1944	13:36	La-5	PQ 35 Ost 00783; 20 km (12 mi) south of Siversky
45	24 January 1944	10:32	Il-2	PQ 26 Ost 90574; 35 km (22 mi) southwest of Lissino	48	16 February 1944	10:28	U-2	PQ 36 Ost 00831; 10 km (6.2 mi) east of Leningrad
46	29 January 1944	10:34	Yak-9	PQ 26 Ost 90584; 25 km (16 mi) southwest of Lissino					
– 4. Staffel of Jagdgeschwader 54 – Eastern Front — 1 March – 19 June 1944
49	7 March 1944	08:49	Yak-9	PQ 25 Ost 70321; Baltic Sea, 45 km (28 mi) northeast of Kunda	60	8 April 1944	09:52	Il-2	PQ 26 Ost 88853; 40 km (25 mi) southeast of Ostrov
50	19 March 1944	08:57	LaGG-3	PQ 25 Ost 88411; 10 km (6.2 mi) southwest of Pskov	61	15 April 1944	15:06	Yak-1? (Note: According to Mathews and Foreman claimed as a Yakovlev Yak-9.)	PQ 25 Ost 88355 east of Ostrov
51	19 March 1944	09:10	LaGG-3	PQ 25 Ost 88274; 15 km (9.3 mi) east of Pskov	62	17 June 1944	13:25? (Note: According to Mathews and Foreman claimed at 13:35.)	Il-2	PQ 25 Ost 91545; 25 km (16 mi) northwest of Zelenogorsk
52	19 March 1944	09:10? (Note: According to Mathews and Foreman claimed at 09:18.)	Yak-9	PQ 25 Ost 88122; 15 km (9.3 mi) north-northwest of Pskov	63	17 June 1944	13:40	Il-2	PQ 26 Ost 81664; 35 km (22 mi) south-southeast of Vyborg
53	26 March 1944	13:00	Yak-9	PQ 25 Ost 78284; 40 km (25 mi) west of Pskov	64♠	19 June 1944	12:48? (Note: According to Mathews and Foreman claimed at 14:48.)	P-39	PQ 26 Ost 81462; 20 km (12 mi) southeast of Vyborg
54	26 March 1944	15:38	Pe-2	PQ 25 Ost 89722; 25 km (16 mi) northwest of Pskov	65♠	19 June 1944	12:53	Il-2	PQ 26 Ost 81467; 10 km (6.2 mi) southeast of Vyborg
55	27 March 1944	06:26	Yak-9	PQ 25 Ost 78262	66♠	19 June 1944	12:56	Il-2	PQ 26 Ost 81497; 10 km (6.2 mi) southeast of Vyborg
56	1 April 1944	10:24	Yak-9	PQ 25 Ost 88524; 10 km (6.2 mi) west of Selo	67♠	19 June 1944	17:07	Il-2	PQ 26 Ost 91377; 30 km (19 mi) south-southeast of Vyborg
57	3 April 1944	12:33	Yak-9	20 km (12 mi) southwest of Selo	68♠	19 June 1944	17:42	Il-2	PQ 26 Ost 91381; 35 km (22 mi) southeast of Vyborg
58	7 April 1944	09:43	Il-2	PQ 25 Ost 88355 vicinity of Selo	69♠	19 June 1944	20:25	P-39	PQ 26 Ost 81833; 10 km (6.2 mi) east of Vyborg
59	8 April 1944	09:47	Il-2	PQ 25 Ost 88854; 40 km (25 mi) southeast of Ostrov					

=== Awards ===
- Iron Cross (1939) 2nd and 1st Class
- Honor Goblet of the Luftwaffe on 1 November 1943 as Unteroffizier and pilot
- German Cross in Gold on 12 December 1943 as Feldwebel in the 12./Jagdgeschwader 54
- Knight's Cross of the Iron Cross on 6 October 1944 as Leutnant and pilot in the II./Jagdgeschwader 54 (Note: According to Scherzer as pilot in the 4./Jagdgeschwader 54.)
