= Andreas Greiner =

German artist

Andreas Greiner (born 1979) is a German artist, based in Berlin. He works with a wide range of different media including sculpture, installation, photography, video and techniques such as electron microscopy, algorithmic image creation and 3D printing. Frequently he works with biological and natural growth processes to create art works. His approach addresses humanity’s relationship with its living and non-living environment and the nature–culture dichotomy.

Throughout his career Greiner has cooperated with experts such as microbiologists, art historians, computer programmers, architects and artists, e.g. Ivy Lee Fiebig, Alexandra Spiegel and the composers Tyler Friedman and Páll Ragnar Pálsson. He is part of two artist collectives: A/A (with Armin Keplinger) and Das Numen (with Julian Charrière, Markus Hoffmann and Felix Kiessling).

Since 2022 Andreas Greiner is a professor of media art at Muthesius Kunsthochschule, Kiel.

== Early life and education ==
Greiner was born in Aachen, Germany. In Florence and San Francisco he initially studied figurative drawing and sculpture to improve his understanding of the human figure and anatomy. Afterwards he studied medicine for three years in Budapest and Dresden. Returning to art at Berlin University of the Arts he enrolled first in multi-media art and later joined the Institute for Spatial Experiments.

== Work ==
Greiner’s work is informed by the natural sciences, technology and the humanities. A central focus of his work is the human–nature relationship and the Anthropocene, as currently discussed in academia and in mainstream media.

Together with the psychologist Gertrude Endejan-Gremse and local citizens, waldfuermorgen e.V. was founded in January 2020. It is a non-profit association that reacts to the massive tree die out in the Harz region, Germany. The project is creating a participatory forest, in which children and families plant trees on the upper outskirts of the city of Goslar, covering around three hectares of land.

In his work Jungle Memory, started in 2017, Greiner seeks to archive endangered forests worldwide in a vast digital database by photographically documenting them, like on the Island of Vilm or the Hambach Forest in Germany, the primeval Bialowieza Forest in Poland, the Red Forest in Chernobyl or the burnt down parts of the Plumas National Forest in California.

== Living art and bioluminescence ==
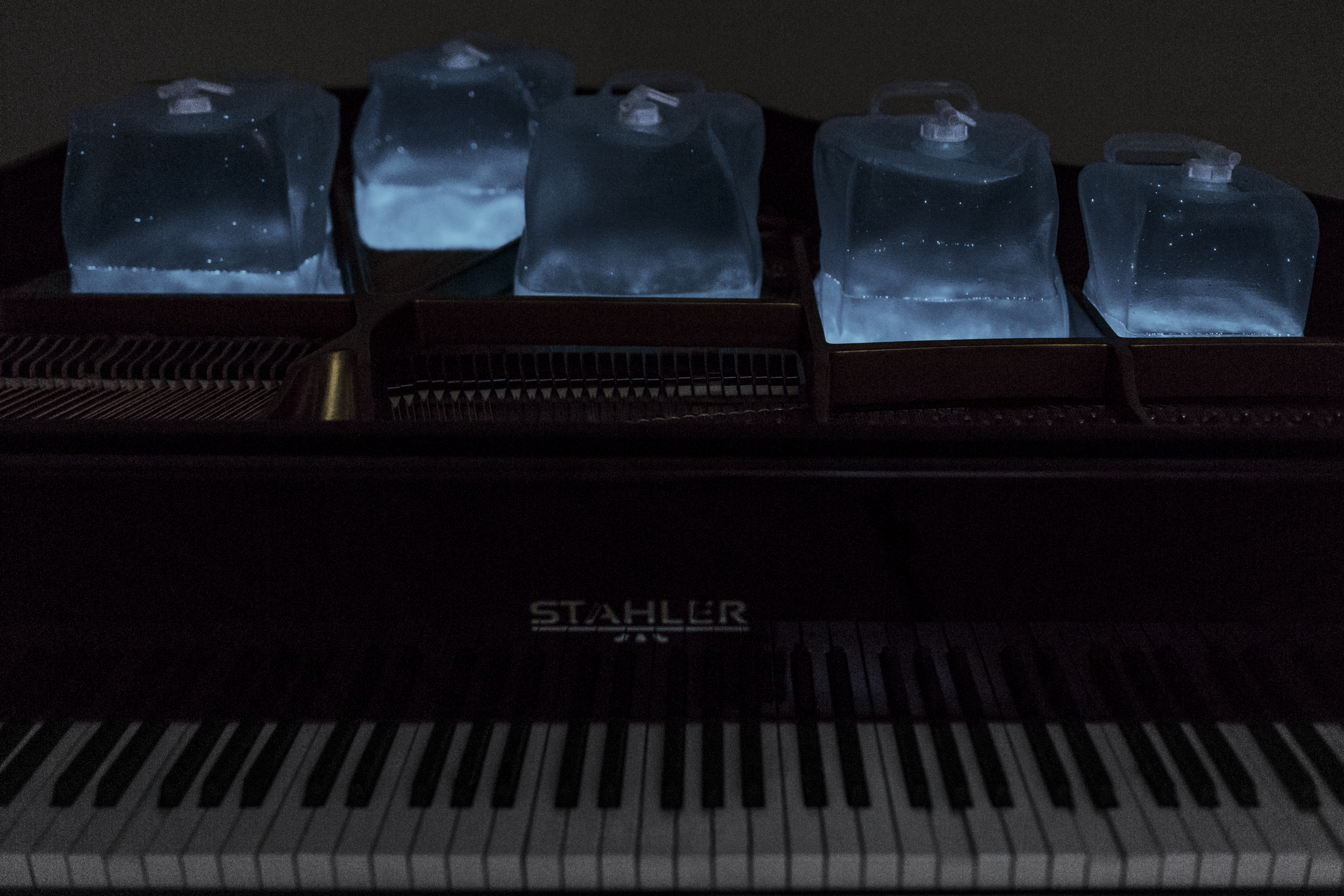
Bioluminescent algae emitting light in response to a composition by Tyler Friedmann, 2014

By incorporating living beings as subjects in his work, Greiner questions the idea of art as man-made. Microorganisms make the outcome of the artwork unpredictable and this loss of control opposes the traditionally executive role of the artist.

A characteristic of Greiner’s work is the cultivation of bioluminescent algae and other bioluminescent creatures. When the water in which the organisms live is disturbed they produce bright blue specks. In a darkened exhibition space this effect has been produced mechanically by Greiner using musical instruments or gyroscopes to disturb the water's surface. Sound waves have also been used to initiate bioluminescence in works accompanied by abstract musical pieces. (see works The Molecular Ordering of Computational Plants, Multitudes, Dreamcatcher, 16 sqm).

== Living sculpture ==
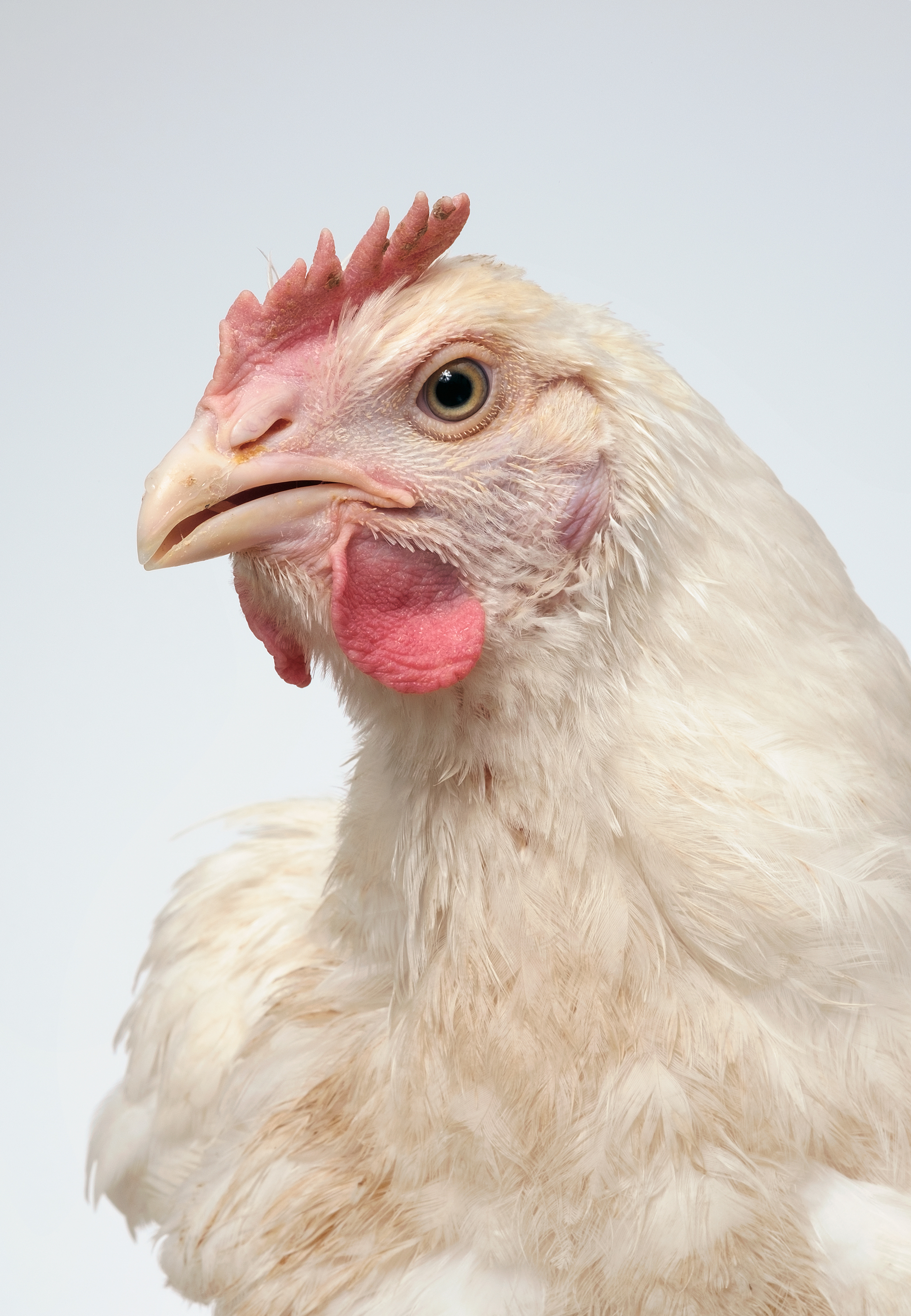
Portrait of Heinrich (Craniocervical)

Greiner also highlights sculptural qualities of phenomena which are not usually associated with sculpture. Traditionally sculpture is a static medium formed from inanimate matter and Greiner seeks to expand this. In the past he has demonstrated the plastic and sculptural qualities of an explosion (Entladung with Fabian Knecht, 2012–2013), of social interactions and of electron microscopies of unicellular organisms (Hybrid Matter).

Greiner has also framed animals as living sculptures. For example in Der freie Grundriss (2014) he placed a pupated fly maggot named Ludwig inside the Neue Nationalgalerie in Berlin (Festival of Future Nows). Once it hatched it became a ‘flying sculpture’. Its status as an art work was confirmed by the artistic director of the Neue Nationalgalerie by signing a contract with Greiner. Another living sculpture conceptualized by Greiner was a hybrid broiler chicken from an industrial fattening plant northeast of Berlin, whom he named Heinrich (2015–2016). Greiner brought him to a suburban petting zoo in October 2015 where he died a few months later. His status as a ‘living sculpture’ was also confirmed with a contract between the petting zoo and Greiner.

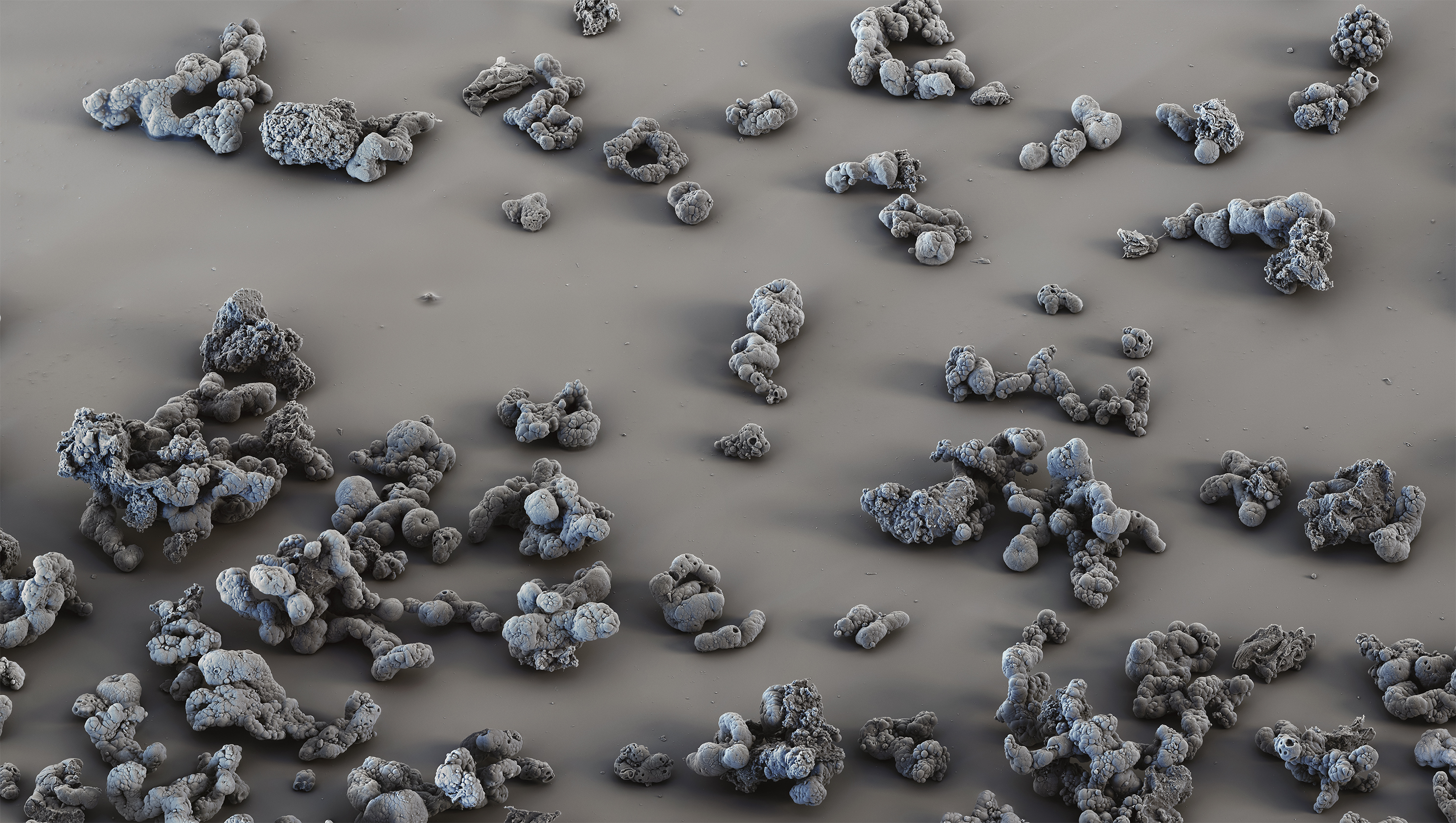
Scanning electron microscope (SEM) images of tumor organoids

== Study (Portrait) of the Singularity of the Animal ==
Study (Portrait) of the Singularity of the Animal (2015 – ongoing) is the title of a series of works exploring the genre of portraiture, altered (unnatural) nature and non-human life beyond human senses. Traditionally this genre has been used to express a human subject’s individuality, character and beauty.

By portraying and naming a set of algae Greiner highlights the individuality, character and specific aesthetics of these microorganisms (8 Heads High, Altered Morphologies). The portraits are made using a scanning electron microscope, making them appear three-dimensional and less abstract from everyday visual experience. Other works using the electron microscope portray mutated cells, such as cancer cells and synthetically created bacterial cells. These contrasting types of mutations provoke the question of what is natural and where humans intervene in growing processes.

== Monument for the 308 ==
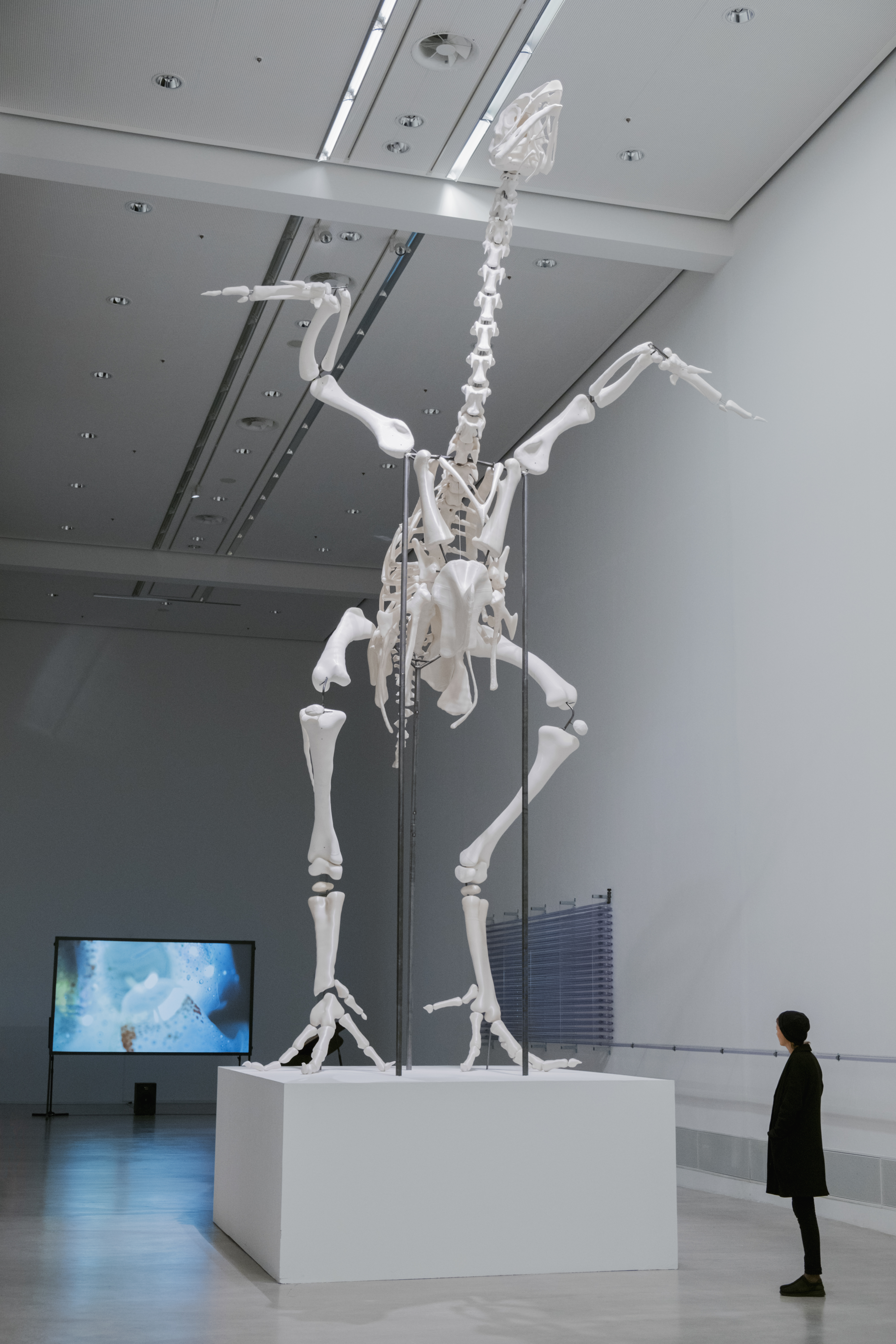
Monument For The 308 installation view at Berlinische Galerie, 2016

Greiner’s work comments on contemporary issues but also seeks to explore possible futures in what he himself has called “archeology of the future”. This idea is recognizable throughout his work, but most prominently in his exhibition for the Museum Berlinische Galerie (2016–2017) or the ‘Kunsthalle‘ Meat Factory in Prague (2018), in which he constructed a monumental sculpture 3D printed from an X-ray scan of a dead-found broiler chicken in an industrial feeding plant (Monument for the 308). This species of hybrid chicken—a modern biofact—is artificially bred, sterile and one of the most consumed animals in the western world. The 8-meter-tall (26 ft) statue was meant to resemble a dinosaur in a natural history museum (see also Weltuntergang – Ende ohne Ende at Natural History Museum in Bern/Switzerland (2018–2019)). Just as dinosaurs are icons of prehistoric eras (Triassic-Cretaceous), Greiner conceives the broiler as an icon of the Anthropocene.

Two years after Greiner exhibited the work, in December 2018, the Royal Society Open Science journal published an article by a group of geologists, paleobiologists and archaeologists, which asserted that common broiler chicken could be a potential paleo-biological marker for the changes brought about in the Anthropocene:

Changing patterns of human resource use and food consumption have profoundly impacted the Earth's biosphere. Until now, no individual taxa have been suggested as distinct and characteristic new morphospecies representing this change. Here we show that the domestic broiler chicken is one such potential marker. [...] Physical and numerical changes to chickens in the second half of the twentieth century, i.e. during the putative Anthropocene Epoch, have been the most dramatic, with large increases in individual bird growth rate and population sizes. Broiler chickens, now unable to survive without human intervention, have a combined mass exceeding that of all other birds on Earth; this novel morphotype symbolizes the unprecedented human reconfiguration of the Earth's biosphere.”

== Exhibitions and awards ==
=== Solo exhibitions ===
- Spring forward, Fall back, Lichthaus, Kunstverein Arnsberg, Arnsberg (DE), 2014
- Touched on the raw, meant as a compliment, curated by Marie Egger, Florian Christopher, Zürich (CH), 2014
- Preis für junge Kunst, NAK, curated by Stefan Vicedom, Neuer Aachener Kunstverein, Aachen (DE), 2014
- Preis für junge Kunst, NAK - Neuer Aachener Kunstverein, Aachen (DE), 2015
- MULTITUDES, Import Projects, Berlin (DE), 2015
- Agentur des Exponenten, Berlinische Galerie, Berlin (DE), 2016
- Naturkunden, Kunstverein Heilbronn, Heilbronn (DE), 2018
- Hybrid Matter, Dittrich&Schlechtriem Galerie, Berlin (DE), 2018
- Monument for the 308, Meet Factory, Praha (CZ), 2018
- Signs of Life, Mönchehaus Museum, Goslar (DE), 2019
- Berliner Luft - Andreas Greiner, Dittrich&Schlechtriem Galerie, Berlin (DE), 2020
- Jungle Memory, Dittrich&Schlechtriem Galerie, Berlin (DE), 2020
- Jungle Memory, Kahán Art Space Vienna (AT), 2021
- Jungle Memory, Kahán Art Space, Budapest (HU), 2021
- Monument for the 308, Phaeno, Wolfsburg (DE), 2023

=== Duo exhibitions ===
- Joseph Beuys | Andreas Greiner: VON BÄUMEN UND WÄLDERN. miteinander gegenüber #3, Kunsthalle Bielefeld, Bielefeld (DE), 2021

=== Collective exhibitions ===
- Dominions, collaboration with Julian Charrière, curated by Carson Chan, Program e.V. Berlin (DE), 2011
- Das Numen SONOR, Schinkel Pavillon, Berlin (DE), 2013
- Golden Gates, A/A collective curated by Lydia Korndörfer, Kwadrat Gallery, Berlin (DE), 2017
- A/A: Hey Mars!, Haus am Lützowplatz, Berlin (DE), 2019
- +/-, A/A (Andreas Greiner und Armin Keplinger), Kwadrat, Berlin (DE), 2021

=== Group exhibitions ===
- Herbarium, Photography & Botany, Fotografisk Center, Copenhagen (DK) 2017
- Produktion: Made in Germany Drei, Sprengel Museum, Hannover (DE), 2017
- Festival of Future Nows, Hamburger Bahnhof - Museum für Gegenwartskunst, Berlin (DE), 2017
- You Are-ontological positions around matter., Reinbeckhallen, Berlin (DE), 2019
- La fabrique du vivant, Centre Pompidou, Paris (FR), 2019
- Alles Im Wunderland, Nassauischer Kunstverein Wiesbaden (DE), 2020
- Zero Waste, Museum der Bildenden Künste Leipzig (DE), 2020
- Yokohama Triennale 2020, Afterglow, Yokohama (JP), 2020
- Future Food, Essen für die Welt von morgen, Deutsches Hygiene-Museum Dresden (DE), 2020
- WILD/ SCHÖN. Tiere in der Kunst, Kunsthalle Emden (DE), 2021
- Grüner Salon - Verantwortungsvolle Technik, Stiftung Kunst und Natur, Nantesbuch (DE), 2021
- PLANET LOVE. Climate Care in the Digital Age - Vienna Biennale for Change 2021, Museum für Angewandte Kunst, Wien (AT), 2021
- BREATHING, Hamburger Kunsthalle, Hamburg (DE), 2022

=== Awards ===
- Conlon Music Prize 2015 for Disklavier Plus (NL), with Tyler Friedman, 2014
- IBB Prize for Photography, 2015
- GASAG Kunstpreis, Berlinische Galerie, Berlin (DE), 2016
- Keiserring Stipendium (DE), 2019
- Art in architecture competition, New building Friedrich Löffler Institute in Mecklenhosrst, 1st place, realization contract, with Takafumi Tsukamoto and Diogo Vale (DE), 2022

== Publications ==
- 24H Skulptur, Notes on Time Sculptures, Dr. Ursula Ströbele & Andreas Greiner Publication with further academic discourse on the occasion of the exhibition in the Sexauer Galerie (curated by Dr. Ursula Ströbele & Andreas Greiner), Distanz Verlag, 2014
- ENTLADUNG, with Fabian Knecht, self-published, 2014
- THAN, with Reto Steiner and Lydia Wilhelm, on the occasion of the exhibition THAN in Kunstverein Shed in Eisenwerk, Frauenfeld, self-published, 2014
- Das Numen, Distanz Verlag, 2015
- Anatomy of a Fairy Tale, Contributing authors: Prof. Dr. Nicole C. Karafyllis, Marie Egger, Desiree Förster, Prof. Dr. Hans-Jörg Rheinberger, Dr. Christiane Stahl, Dr. Ursula Ströbele, Stefan Vicedom, monograph with further academic discourse on the occasion of the Prize for Young Art in the NAC 2014, Verlag für Moderne Kunst, 2015
- Agency of the Exponent, GASAG Art Award 2016, on the occasion of the solo exhibition at the Berlinische Galery, Kerber Verlag, 2016
- Hybrid Matter, Publication on the occasion of the solo exhibition of the exhibition in the Dittrich&Schlechtriem Galery, self-published, 2018
- Jungle Memory, Publication on the occasion of the solo exhibition of the exhibition in the Dittrich&Schlechtriem Galery, Eigenverlag, 2020
- Life Forms. Essays on the Artwork of Andreas Greiner, and the Display, Synthesis, and Simulation of Life, Carson Chan & Andreas Greiner, contributing Authors: Gregory Cartelli, Ryan Roark, J.D. Schnepf, Dr. Ursula Ströbele, Mareike Vennen, J. Craig Venter, Olivier Zeitoun, monograph with further academic discourse on the occasion of the solo exhibition at Kunstverein Heilbronn and Mönchehaus Museum Goslar, Snoeck Verlag, 2020
