= Evžen =

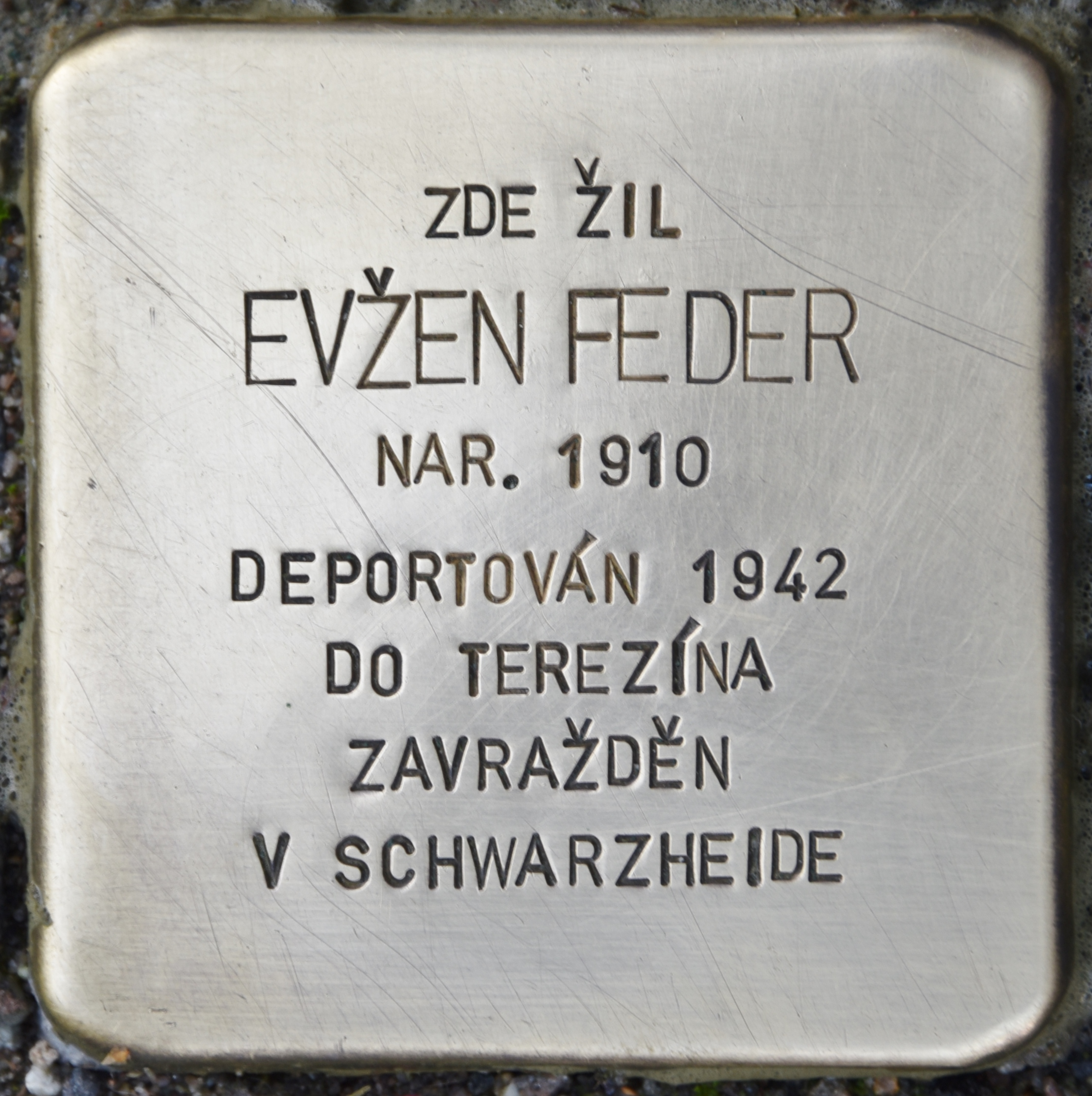

Evžen, a Czech men's given name, may refer to:

- Evžen Čermák (1932–2018), Czech alpine skier
- Evžen Deroko (1860-1944), Serbian philatelist
- Evžen Hadamczik (1939–1984), Czech football player and manager
- Evzen Kolar (1950–2017), Czech film producer
- Evžen Korec (born 1956), Czech scientist and businessman
- Evžen Linhart (1898–1949), Czech architect and designer of furniture
- Evžen Neustupný (1933–2021), Czech archaeologist
- Evžen Plocek (1929–1969), self-immolated protester
- Evžen Rošický (1914–1942), Czech athlete and journalist
- Evžen Sokolovský (1925–1998), Czech theatre director and director
- Evžen Tošenovský (born 1956), Czech politician
- Evžen Vohák (born 1975), Czech footballer
