= DeRocco =

DeRocco, de Rocco or Deroko is a surname of Italian origin that may refer to

- Aleksandar Deroko (1894–1988), Serbian architect, artist, and author
- Jason DeRocco (born 1989), Canadian volleyball player
- Jovan Deroko (1912–1941), Serbian military commander, cousin of Aleksandar
- Linda De Rocco (born 1986), Italian ice hockey player
- Stelio DeRocco (born 1960), Canadian volleyball player and coach, father of Jason
