= Evžen Deroko =

Serbian and Yugoslavian railway engineer

Eugen Derocco
- Евжен Дероко / Evžen Deroko
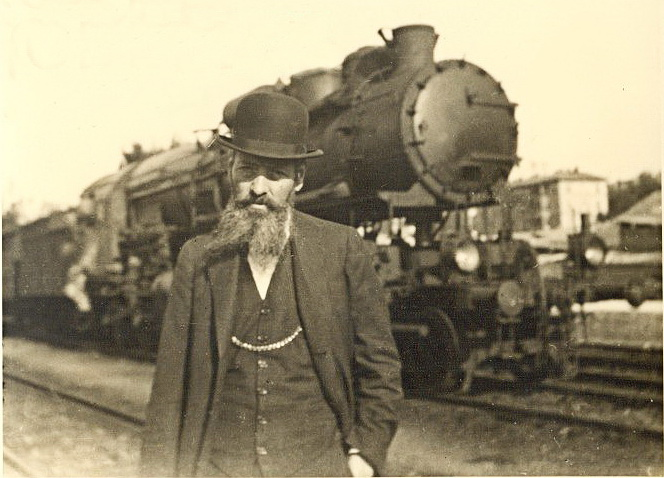
- Eugen Derocco in Sušak, 1928
- Born: 19 August [O.S. 7 August] 1860; Belgrade, Serbia
- Died: May 18, 1944 (aged 83); Belgrade, Yugoslavia
- Relatives: Aleksandar Deroko (son); Jovan Deroko (nephew)

Eugen Derocco (Serbian: Евжен Дероко, Evžen Deroko; 19 August [O.S. 7 August] 1860 - 18 May 1944) was a Serbian and Yugoslavian railway engineer and administrator. He is best known as the pioneer of Serbian and Yugoslavian philately and author of numerous philatelic books and papers. He was and remains the foremost expert on Serbian pre-World War I postage stamps. He was called "the greatest Serbian philatelic researcher, author and collector", "the greatest Yugoslavian philatelist", and "Belgrade's most important philatelist in history".

== Biography ==
Eguen Derocco was born on 19 August [O.S. 7 August] 1860 in Belgrade, the capital of the Principality of Serbia, where he spent most of his life. His father Jovan Derocco, an art teacher, originated from Dubrovnik, and his mother Katarina from Vienna. He finished elementary school graduated from gymnasium in 1878. Then, he enrolled the Department of Science and Mathematics of the Faculty of Philosophy in Belgrade. In 1883, he was given a state scholarship by the Ministry of Construction for studying at the Austrian State Railways. Later the same year, the Society for the Construction and Exploitation of Serbian Railways (Society) awarded him scholarship for studying railway engineering at the Belgian Railways. After graduating in Belgium, he returned to Belgrade in 1884.

=== Railways career ===
After returning from Belgium, Derocco was given a job at the Society as a railway inspector. After the Serbian Railways were nationalized in 1889, Derocco continued to work for the railways. He gradually progressed in his career, and on 31 October 1913, he became head of the transport department of the Railways. After the World War I and the creation of Yugoslavia in 1918, Derocco worked with the Ministry of Transportation. On 6 November 1920, he was named deputy director of the State Railways, a position he held until his retirement on 2 October 1924. Deroocco participated in many international conferences and negotiations regarding railways.

After retiring from the Railways, Derocco worked for a while as a director of the "Putnik" tourist agency.

=== Family ===
Derocco belonged to a notable Belgrade family. Eugen's paternal grandfather Marco DeRocco moved from Venice to Dubrovnik in 1808. There, he married and had two sons, Antonio and Jovan. Jovan (Eugen's father) moved to Belgrade and married Katarina Vuković (Eugen's mother) from Vienna, who was of Serbian and Austrian ancestry. They had five sons: Marko, Eugen, Vladislav, Nikola and Dragutin.

In 1884, Eugen Derocco married Angelina "Anđa" Derocco, née Mihajlović, from Mokrin. Her uncle was Jovan Đorđević, the founder of the Serbian National Theatre, and her cousin was writer Stevan Sremac. She died in 1937. They had two sons: Aleksandar, famous architect, and Jovan, and a daughter named Natalija "Talica". Military officer Jovan Deroko was Eugen's nephew, son of Eugen's brother Vladislav.

== Philately ==
Derocco started collecting stamps in 1872. He especially collected stamps of Serbia, Slovenia, Bosnia and Herzegovina, Croatia and Yugoslavia. He studied and wrote about the stamps of Serbia, Sloveni and Yugoslavia. He was licensed atestator of Serbian and Slovenian stamps. His collection of pre-WWI Serbian stamps was exhibited at the 1906 London Philatelic Exhibition and the 1911 Vienna Exhibition. He was member of the jury on many international philatelic exhibitions, including the 1911 Vienna exhibition, IPOSTA 1930 in Berlin, WIPA 1933 in Vienna, SITEB 1935 in Brussels, Ostropa 1935 in Königsberg, Praga 1938 in Prague, and was president of the jury at the 1937 ZEFIB in Belgrade.

Derocco's collection of Serbian postage stamps and postal stationeries was destroyed in the World War I. He sold another one of his notable collections, that of Slovenian stamps, during the World War II because he fell to poverty. The rest of his stamp collections were inherited by his daughter who was living in the United States. His collection of postmarks was donated to the Postal Museum in Belgrade by his son.

In 1921, when the Serbian Philatelic Club was established in Belgrade, Derocco became an honorary member, and in 1925 he was elected president of the club. He was an honorary member of the Croatian Philatelic Society in Zagreb and Slovenian Philatelic Association in Ljubljana. When the Yugoslavian Philatelic Association was established in 1933, Derocco was elected its first president, and he remained on that post until the Association was abolished in 1941. In 1937, he resigned as the president of the Serbian Philatelistic Club due to old age, and was then elected Club's lifelong honorary president.

=== Works ===
Derocco was fluent, beside Serbian, in German, French, English and Italian. He studied foreign philatelic literature and became the foremost philatelic expert in Serbia. He published many articles in Serbian, Yugoslavian and foreign journals, including Berliner Briefmarken-Zeitung, Die Postmarke, Die Ganzsache, Illustriertes Briefmarken-Journal, and Donaupost. He wrote popular philatelic columns for Vreme and Novosti. He was one of the main editors of the Belgrade's Filatelist journal. He also wrote several books about the history of postal stamps of Serbia.

This is the list of books by Eugen Derocco:

- Geschichte der Postwertzeichen von Serbien 1866-1911 ("History of Postage Stamps of Serbia 1866-1911"), Berlin, 1914
- Poštanske marke Srbije u istoriskom pregledu ("Postage stamps of Serbia in historical overview"), Belgrade, 1935
- Die Poststempel von Serbien 1840 bis 1921 ("The Postmarks of Serbia 1840 to 1921"), Vienna, 1936
- Građa za istoriju pošta u Srbiji ("Material for the history of the post office in Serbia"), Belgrade, 1939
- Istorija poštanskih maraka Srbije ("History of postage stamps of Serbia"), Belgrade, 1940

== Awards ==
In 1936, Eugen Derocco was awarded the Lindenberg Medal, the most prestigious German philatelic award, for "merits in philatelic research". Derocco was commemorated on the Serbian 46 dinars postal stamp issued in 2007.

As of 1928, Eugen Derocco was recipient of those chivalric orders:

- Order of the Cross of Takovo, 4th class
- Order of St. Sava, 2nd class
- Order of the White Eagle, 3rd class
- Legion of Honour, 5th class
- Order of the Crown of Italy, 2nd class
- Order of the Star of Romania, 3rd class
- Order of the Crown of Romania, 2nd class
