= Jovan Deroko =

Serbian military commander

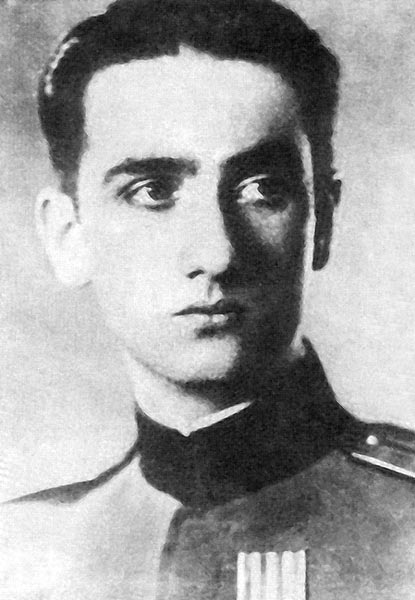
- Born: 7 April 1912; Le Creusot, France
- Died: 6 November 1941 (aged 29); Ljubić, Nazi-occupied Serbia
- Military career
- Allegiance: Kingdom of Yugoslavia; Chetniks
- Branch: Čačak Chetnik detachment
- Rank: II Class Captain
- Conflicts: Battle for Čačak; Siege of Kraljevo

Jovan Deroko (Serbian Cyrillic: Јован Дероко; 7 April 1912 – 6 November 1941) was a Serbian military commander holding the rank of captain during World War II.

Deroko is notable for leading joint Chetnik–Partisan operations. Later, he was killed by Partisan soldiers.

== Early life ==
Jovan Deroko was born in the French city of Le Creusot on 20 April [O.S. 7 April] 1912 to Vladislav and Natalija Deroko (née Đorđević). His maternal grandfather was the politician Vladan Đorđević, who had served as the Prime Minister of Serbia and the mayor of Belgrade during his long career and who was of partial Aromanian descent from the region of Macedonia. One of Jovan Deroko's great-grandfathers was a Venetian by the name of Marco de Rocco, who moved to Dubrovnik and married a local woman. The surname de Rocco was later phoneticized to Deroko. Deroko's paternal uncle was philatelist Evžen Deroko whose son was well-known Serbian architect Aleksandar Deroko.

== World War II ==
Deroko's division was stationed on the periphery of Zagreb at the same time Croatian officers were massively leaving the Yugoslav side. The Wehrmacht entered Zagreb without battle and Deroko retreated towards Montenegro in order to escape imprisonment. He continued towards the Bojana river as was stated by the P-41 plan by General Dušan Simović. After the Yugoslav government capitulated, Deroko and numerous officers left for the Bay of Kotor with the goal of joining the government-in-exile in London and by offering them his services as an officer who wishes to continue to battle. Along with him at that time was colonel Zvonimir Vučković who escaped to Montenegro after the capitulation.

While at the Bay of Kotor, Deroko found out that Draža Mihailović is hiding out somewhere in the western part of Serbia and Deroko tried to contact him. He soon found a contact with high-ranking politicians who let him know Mihailović's whereabouts. In the middle of June, Deroko arrived at Ravna Gora and quickly made himself known as one of the most capable commanders and became known as the youngest captain in the entire Chetnik organization. After organizing the first Chetnik battalions, Deroko was assigned the task of organizing the Ljubić area.

In the first joint Chetnik–Partisan operations in the western part of Serbia, Deroko took part in liberating Čačak. The Jelica Partisan detachment also took part in the action. In Čačak, two German cannons were captured. The cannons were immediately given to Deroko who used them in his battles. Deroko thus became the commander of the first Chetnik artillery unit in western Serbia. Upon freeing the city, Deroko was named the temporary representative of the Chetnik command in Čačak while Ratko Mitrović was named the Partisan representative. Draža Mihailović then gave Deroko the responsibility of being the chief executive of the High Command and command of the artillery unit which took part in the Battle of Kraljevo that took place in the first few days of October and lasted almost a month. The commander of the Chetnik forces was major Radoslav Đurić while Deroko still held the function of chief executive and commander of the artillery unit located at the Ibar river.

During the siege, Deroko managed to take out a German airport near Kraljevo and to cut off German communication between Kraljevo and Belgrade. The failed siege of Kraljevo also marked the beginning of the civil war between Partisans and Chetniks. After the Chetnik attack on Užice on 1 November 1941 (known as the Battle of Trešnjica), Deroko gained new functions. After the beginning of the first serious battles between Chetniks and Partizans, Deroko represented the Chetnik delegation at the talks of stopping the battles. The first meeting was held in the Drakčići village near Kraljevo. At the meeting, present were Deroko and major Đurić from the Chetnik side and Sredoje Urošević from the Partisan side. The talks however didn't have any result. During the talks, Deroko ordered that the Partisan delegation be apprehended as a retaliation to the Partisan attack on the Chetnik formation in Čačak. After tiresome negotiations, Deroko freed the Partisan delegations but the Partisans had already surrounded the village. This led to an armed confrontation which lasted until Deroko and his group were kicked out of the village.

== Death and legacy ==
Deroko then attacked a new area of Ljubić with his cannons with the aim of bombing Čačak which was held by Partisans. The Partisan patrol found out where Deroko was in Ljubić so as a preventative measure, the Jelica Partisan unit was sent in to thwart Deroko. The battle began in the evening hours of 6 November 1941 in Ljubić. The Partisans wanted to destroy the two cannons Deroko was using. Deroko took control of the area on the surrounding hills beside a small lake from which he had a good view of the situation. In trying to stop the Partisan unit which was advancing upon the hill however, Deroko was killed beside his cannons when struck in the head. After that, the Partisans took the two cannons and used them in their units. The second version of his death states that Deroko was lightly wounded and went down to the lake to take care of his wound where he was spotted by a Partisan platoon which executed him on the spot.

According to testimonies of some of the Chetniks, Partisans first captured Deroko and then murdered him.

When he was killed, Deroko was only 29 years old. Besides proving himself a capable commander, he was a renowned writer as well. Since he lived in the Toplica region in the years of the beginning of the famous Toplica Uprising, Deroko wrote the book Toplički ustanak while still preparing to enter the army.

Deroko's death was part of the build-up to an all-out civil war in Yugoslavia.

The song Dva Dražina momka (also known as Nad Kraljevom živa vatra seva) is about his death and the death of his fellow soldier and friend Simo Uzelac who was with him at the time.
