= Kraljevo massacre =

Massacre in German-occupied Serbia

Coordinates: 43°43′25″N 20°41′15″E

- Part of World War II in Yugoslavia
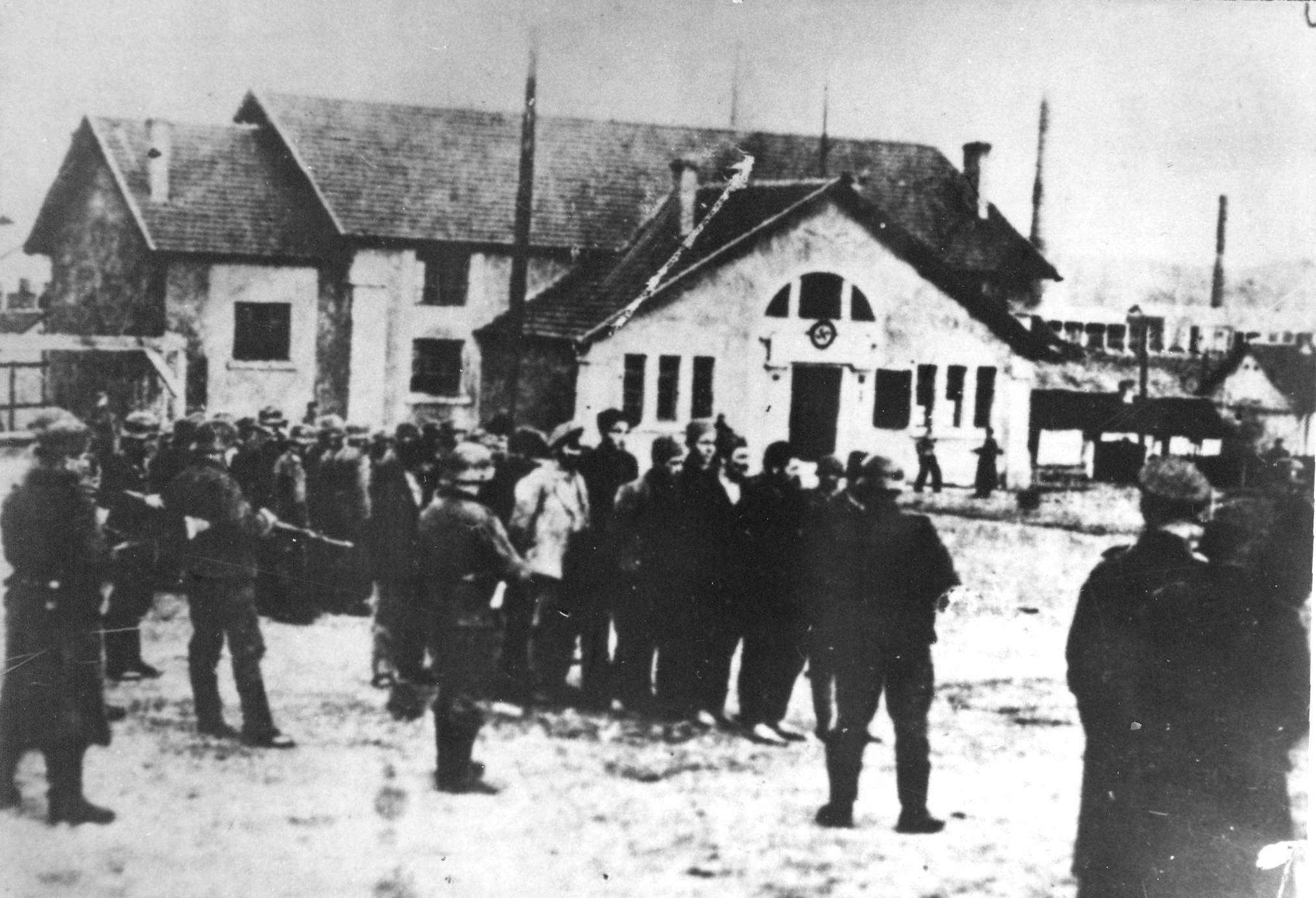
- A round-up in the city
- Location: Kraljevo, German-occupied territory of Serbia
- Date: 15–20 October 1941
- Target: Residents of Kraljevo, mostly Serbs
- Attack type: Mass murder, mass shooting, war crime
- Deaths: c. 2,000
- Perpetrator: German Army
- Motive: Reprisal, anti-Serb sentiment

The Kraljevo massacre was the World War II mass murder of approximately 2,000 residents of the city of Kraljevo in the German-occupied territory of Serbia between 15 and 20 October 1941 by the German Army. The massacre came in reprisal for a joint Partisan–Chetnik attack on a German garrison during the Siege of Kraljevo in which 10 German soldiers were killed and 14 wounded. The number of hostages to be shot was calculated based on a ratio of 100 hostages executed for every German soldier killed and 50 hostages executed for every German soldier wounded, a formula devised by Adolf Hitler with the intent of suppressing anti-Nazi resistance in Eastern Europe.

The German Army initially responded by rounding up and executing 300 Serbian civilians, described in contemporary documents as "communists, nationalists, democrats and Jews." Over the following several days, all men between the ages of 14 and 60 were arrested and herded into a makeshift detention centre at the local rolling-stock factory. Once there, their papers were checked and their names entered into a ledger. When the camp was full, the German Army ordered groups of 100 prisoners to march to pre-dug mass graves, where they were executed with heavy machine guns. The bodies were then examined for any signs of life; victims that had survived the initial volley were dealt a single bullet to the head. Once the first group had been liquidated, the soldiers returned to the factory and collected the next 100 victims. This process continued until all the men that were rounded up had been killed. The reprisals lasted several days. Following the shooting of hostages from the rolling-stock factory, the German Army deployed through the surrounding villages, burning homes and killing indiscriminately. According to the 717th Infantry Division's own records, 1,736 men and 19 "communist" women from the city and its outskirts were executed, despite attempts by local collaborationists to mitigate the punishment. Twenty members of the 717th Infantry Division were later conferred Iron Crosses for their role in the killings.

The massacre at Kraljevo, as well as a similar and nearly concurrent massacre in nearby Kragujevac, convinced German commanders that mass killings of Serbian hostages were not only ineffectual but also counterproductive, as they drove locals into the hands of insurgents and sometimes resulted in the deaths of factory workers contributing to the German war effort. Following the war, several senior German military officials were tried and convicted for their involvement in the reprisal shootings at the Nuremberg trials and the subsequent Nuremberg trials.

== Background ==
Following the 1938 Anschluss between Germany and Austria, Yugoslavia came to share its northwestern border with the Third Reich and fell under increasing pressure as her neighbours aligned themselves with the Axis powers. In April 1939, Italy opened a second frontier with Yugoslavia when it invaded and occupied neighbouring Albania. At the outbreak of World War II, the Yugoslav government declared its neutrality. Between September and November 1940, Hungary and Romania joined the Tripartite Pact, aligning themselves with the Axis, and Italy invaded Greece. From then, Yugoslavia was almost surrounded by the Axis powers and their satellites, and her neutral stance toward the war became strained. In late February 1941, Bulgaria joined the Pact. The following day, German troops entered Bulgaria from Romania, almost closing the ring around Yugoslavia. Intent on securing his southern flank for the impending attack on the Soviet Union, Adolf Hitler began placing heavy pressure on Yugoslavia to join the Axis. On 25 March 1941, after some delay, the Yugoslav government conditionally signed the Pact. Two days later, a group of pro-Western, Serbian nationalist Royal Yugoslav Air Force officers deposed the country's regent, Prince Paul, in a bloodless coup d'état, placed his teenage nephew Peter on the throne, and brought to power a "government of national unity" led by the head of the Royal Yugoslav Air Force, General Dušan Simović. The coup enraged Hitler, who immediately ordered the country's invasion, which commenced on 6 April 1941.

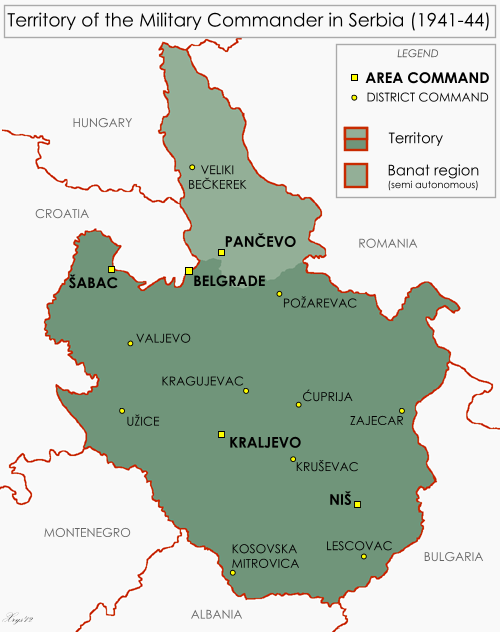
Map of German-occupied Serbia

Yugoslavia was overwhelmed by the combined strength of the Axis powers and surrendered in less than two weeks. The government and royal family went into exile, and the country was occupied and dismembered by its neighbours. The German-occupied territory of Serbia was limited to the pre-Balkan War borders of the Kingdom of Serbia and was directly occupied by the Germans for the key rail and riverine transport routes that passed through it, as well as its valuable resources, particularly non-ferrous metals. The occupied territory covered about 51,000 km^{2} (20,000 mi^{2}) and had a population of 3.8 million. Hitler had briefly considered erasing all existence of a Serbian state, but this was quickly abandoned and the Germans began searching for a Serb suitable to lead a puppet government in Belgrade. They initially settled on Milan Aćimović, a staunch anti-communist who served as Yugoslavia's Minister of Internal Affairs during the winter of 1939–1940.

Two resistance movements emerged following the invasion: the communist-led, multi-ethnic Partisans, and the royalist, Serbian nationalist Chetniks, although during 1941, within the occupied territory, even the Partisans consisted almost entirely of Serbs. The Partisans were led by the General Secretary of the Communist Party of Yugoslavia Josip Broz Tito, while the Chetniks were led by Colonel Draža Mihailović, an officer in the interwar Royal Yugoslav Army. The two movements had widely diverging goals. Whereas the Partisans sought to turn Yugoslavia into a communist state under Tito's leadership, the Chetniks sought a return to the pre-war status quo, whereby the Yugoslav monarchy—and, by extension, Serb political hegemony—would be restored. Communist resistance commenced in early July, shortly after the invasion of the Soviet Union, targeting both the Germans and the puppet authorities. By late August 1941, the Partisans and Chetniks were carrying out joint attacks against the Germans. The Partisans were well organised and many of their commanders had ample military experience, having fought in the Spanish Civil War. By late summer, they had 8,000 fighters spread across 21 detachments in the occupied territory. The officers, non-commissioned officers and men that formed the nucleus of the Chetniks were former members of the Royal Yugoslav Army. They could field around 20,000 fighters in the occupied territory at the time of the massacre.

== Prelude ==
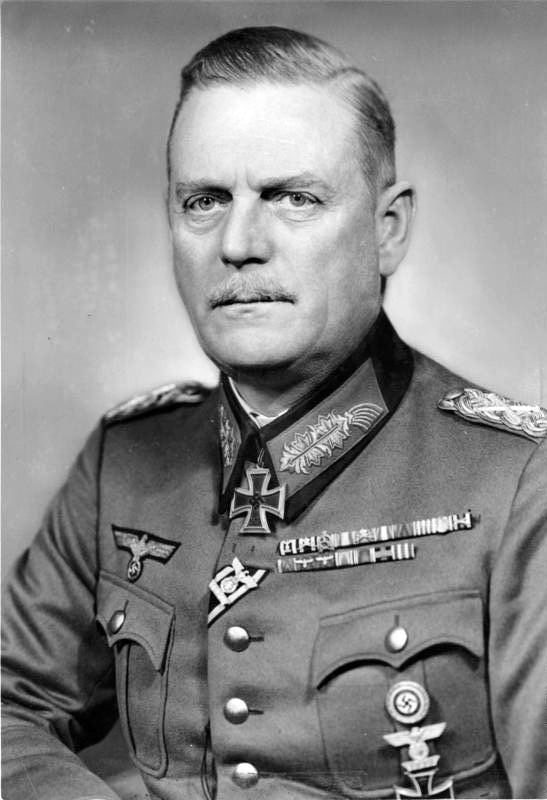
Generalfeldmarschall Wilhelm Keitel issued Hitler's order regarding the ratio of hostages to be shot.

On 29 August, the Germans replaced Aćimović with Yugoslavia's former Minister of the Army and Navy and Chief of the General Staff, General Milan Nedić, another fervent anti-communist, who formed a new puppet government. Nedić's inability to crush the Partisans and Chetniks prompted the Military Commander in Serbia to request German reinforcements from other parts of the continent. In mid-September, they transferred the 125th Infantry Regiment from Greece and the 342nd Infantry Division from France to help put down the uprising in Serbia. On 16 September, Hitler issued Directive No. 312 to Generalfeldmarschall (Field Marshal) Wilhelm List, the Wehrmacht commander in Southeast Europe, ordering him to suppress all resistance in that part of the continent. That same day, the Supreme Command of the Armed Forces (Oberkommando der Wehrmacht; OKW) issued Hitler's order on the suppression of "Communist Armed Resistance Movements in the Occupied Areas", signed by Generalfeldmarschall Wilhelm Keitel. This decree specified that all attacks against the Germans on the Eastern Front were to be "regarded as being of communist origin", and that 100 hostages were to be shot for every German soldier killed and 50 were to be shot for every German soldier wounded. It was intended to apply to all of Eastern Europe, though an identical policy had already been implemented in Serbia as early as 28 April 1941, aimed at deterring guerrilla attacks. Attacks against the Germans increased during the spring and summer, and Serbia once again became a warzone. German troops fanned through the countryside burning villages, taking hostages and establishing concentration camps. The first mass executions of hostages commenced in July.

The strengthening of Germany's military presence in Serbia resulted in a new wave of mass executions and war crimes. The commanders who bore the most responsibility for these atrocities were primarily of Austrian origin and had served in the Austro-Hungarian Army during World War I. Most were ardently anti-Serb, a prejudice that the historian Stevan K. Pavlowitch links to the Nazis' wider anti-Slavic racism.

On 19 September, General der Gebirgstruppe (Lieutenant General) Franz Böhme was appointed as Plenipotentiary Commanding General in Serbia, with direct responsibility for quelling the revolt, bringing with him the staff of XVIII Mountain Corps. He was allocated additional forces to assist him in doing so, reinforcing the three German occupation divisions already in the territory. These divisions were the 704th Infantry Division, 714th Infantry Division and 717th Infantry Division. Böhme boasted a profound hatred of Serbs and encouraged his predominantly Austrian-born troops to exact "vengeance" against them. His primary grievances were the assassination of Archduke Franz Ferdinand and subsequent Austro-Hungarian military defeats at the hands of the Royal Serbian Army, which he thought could only be rectified by the reprisal shooting of Serbian civilians. "In Serbia," he wrote, "it is necessary, on the basis of the Balkan mentality and the great expansion of insurgent movements ... to carry out the orders of the OKW in the most severe form."

== Killings ==
Kraljevo is a city located about 150 kilometres (93 mi) south of Belgrade. At the time of the massacre, it was situated along a vital transport route and was the seat of a German divisional command. In mid-October 1941, (Note: Holocaust historian Christopher Browning writes that the incident occurred on 15–16 October, while journalist Misha Glenny gives the date as 17 October.) the Partisans and Chetniks laid siege (Siege of Kraljevo) to a 2,200-strong German garrison in the city. Ten German soldiers were killed and 14 wounded in the attack. "Not only will 100 Serbs be shot for each German," the garrison commander declared, "their families and property will also be destroyed." He then gave orders for the arrest and summary execution of 300 Serbian civilians. His orders were promptly carried out. The victims were described in contemporary German military documents as "communists, nationalists, democrats and Jews".

New orders were subsequently issued demanding further executions. According to eyewitness accounts, the German Army went from house to house over the next several days, arresting all males between the ages of 14 and 60. They were herded into a makeshift detention centre at a former rolling-stock factory. (Note: The Germans had dismantled the factory in August 1941 and expropriated its machinery and materials, shipping them off to the Reich for use in German factories.) Once there, their papers were checked and their names entered into a ledger. When the camp was full, the German Army ordered groups of 100 prisoners to march to pre-dug mass graves, where they were executed with heavy machine guns. The bodies were then examined for any signs of life; victims that had survived the initial volley were dealt a single bullet to the head. Once the first group had been liquidated, the soldiers returned to the factory and collected the next 100 victims. This process continued until all the men that were rounded up had been killed.

The reprisals lasted several days. Following the shooting of hostages from the rolling-stock factory, the German Army deployed through the surrounding villages, burning homes and killing indiscriminately. According to the 717th Infantry Division's own records, by 17 or 20 October, 1,736 men and 19 "communist" women from the city and its outskirts had been shot. The executions were carried out despite attempts by local collaborationists to mitigate the punishment. Most of those killed were ethnic Serbs, though 80 Roma (Gypsies) were also among the victims, as were some Jews, and several dozen Slovene refugees. Among the dead was the entire Serbian workforce of an airplane factory producing armaments for the Germans. The factory workers had been interned on suspicion of sabotage. Forty members of the collaborationist Serbian Volunteer Command were also inadvertently killed. Generalmajor (Brigadier General) Paul Hoffmann, the commander of the 717th Infantry Division, personally oversaw the reprisals and praised his men for their "enthusiastic fulfillment of what was required of them". Another officer lauded his men for demonstrating "great bravery in action". Twenty members of the 717th Infantry Division were later conferred the Iron Cross, 2nd Class for their role in the massacre.

== Aftermath and legacy ==
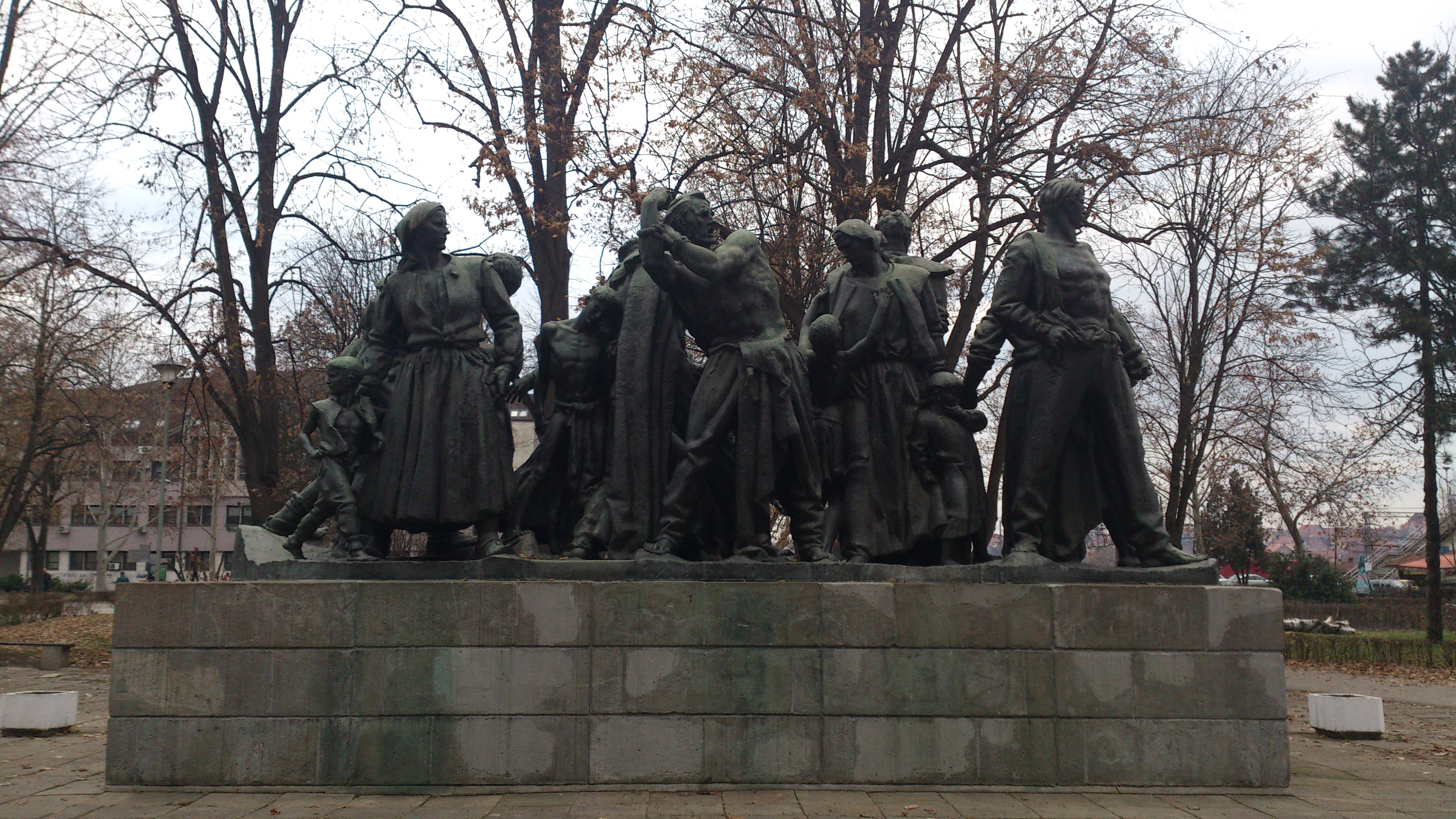
A monument in Kraljevo commemorating the massacre.

The massacre at Kraljevo, as well as a similar and nearly concurrent massacre in nearby Kragujevac, was met with outrage by the Serbian puppet government, which responded with pleas, interventions and threats of resignation. The killings led German military commanders in Serbia to question the efficacy of mass reprisal shootings, as they pushed thousands of Serbs into the hands of anti-German guerrillas. The killing of airplane factory workers in Kraljevo convinced the OKW that arbitrary shootings of Serbs not only incurred a significant political cost but were also counterproductive. The ratio of 100 executions for one soldier killed and 50 executions for one soldier wounded was reduced by half in February 1943, and removed altogether that autumn. Henceforth, each individual execution had to be approved by Special Envoy Hermann Neubacher.

The killings exacerbated tensions between the Partisans and Chetniks. They also convinced Mihailović that active resistance was futile for as long as the Germans held an unassailable military advantage in the Balkans, and that killing German troops would only result in the unnecessary deaths of tens of thousands of Serbs. He therefore decided to scale back Chetnik guerrilla attacks and wait for an Allied landing in the Balkans.

List and Böhme were both captured at the end of the war. On 10 May 1947, they were charged with war crimes and crimes against humanity as part of the Hostages Trial of the subsequent Nuremberg trials. One of the crimes specifically listed in Count 1 of the indictment was the massacre of 2,300 hostages in Kragujevac. Böhme committed suicide before his arraignment. List was found guilty on Count 1, as well as on another count. He was sentenced to life imprisonment in 1948, but was released due to ill health in 1953. Despite this, he lived until June 1971. Keitel was found guilty of war crimes and crimes against humanity at the Nuremberg trials, and subsequently hanged. Hoffmann, whom the local population dubbed the "butcher of Kraljevo and Kragujevac", was promoted to command the more capable 352nd Infantry Division in November 1941. He ended the war as the commander of a prisoner-of-war camp, having been demoted for refusing to shoot deserters in Ukraine. The 717th Infantry Division was reorganised as the 117th Jäger Division later in the war and its troops took part in a massacre of hundreds of Greek civilians at Kalavryta in December 1943.

Like the massacre at Kragujevac, the Kraljevo massacre came to symbolise the brutality of the German occupation in Yugoslav popular memory. The historian Jozo Tomasevich describes the killings as "the two most horrible outrages that the Germans committed in Serbia" on the basis of Hitler's decree. The Kragujevac massacre remains better known than the one in Kraljevo, though both occurred around the same time and resulted in a similar number of deaths. This may be because schoolchildren were among the Kragujevac victims. Following the war, it was widely accepted that 7,000 civilians had been executed in Kragujevac and 6,000 had been executed in Kraljevo. The number of victims believed to have been killed in Kraljevo has since been reduced to around 2,000 by modern Serbian and German historians. A similar re-examining has taken place with regard to the massacre at Kragujevac, where both Serbian and German scholars agree that more than 2,700 civilians were killed. The total number of individuals killed in the two massacres is believed to be around 5,000.

== See also ==
- List of massacres in Yugoslavia
