= Siege of Kraljevo =

1941 siege in Serbia

- Part of the Uprising in Serbia during World War II in Yugoslavia
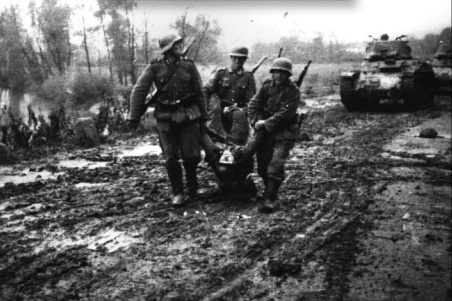
- German soldiers carry a dead comrade killed during the siege of Kraljevo in October 1941
Date	9 October 1941 – 31 October 1941
Location	Kraljevo, German-occupied territory of Serbia (modern-day Serbia) 43°43′25″N 20°41′15″E
Result	German forces retain control of Kraljevo

Belligerents
Axis: Germany	Allies: Chetniks Yugoslav Partisans

Commanders and leaders
(Nazi Germany) Franz Böhme	(Chetniks) Radoslav Đurić; (Chetniks) Jovan Deroko; Jovan Bojović †; Ratko Mitrović; Momčilo Radosavljević

Units involved
(Nazi Germany) HQ of 749th Infantry regiment with one battalion; (Nazi Germany) 6th and 7th companies of the II Battalion of the 737th Jäger Regiment; (Nazi Germany) 670th Artillery Battalion; (Nazi Germany) The 522 sapper squad of 714th Jäger Division; (Nazi Germany) parts of units retreated from Užice, Požega and Čačak; (Nazi Germany) 717th Jäger Division	Chetnik Detachments: (Chetniks) Jelica; (Chetniks) Bukovik; (Chetniks) Ibar; (Chetniks) Žiča; (Chetniks) Death; Dragačevo Battalion; Ljubić Battalion; Jovan Kursula Detachment

Strength
	(Chetniks) 3,000–4,000

Casualties and losses
	130 dead rebels, mostly Chetniks; approximately 2,000 civilians

The siege of Kraljevo was the most important battle during the uprising in Serbia in 1941. The siege lasted from 9 to 31 October 1941. The battle was waged between besieging forces of the Chetniks and Yugoslav Partisans against German forces garrisoned in Kraljevo in the German-occupied territory of Serbia (modern-day Serbia).

The rebel forces had between 3,000 and 4,000 soldiers. The battle started on 9 October 1941 when Chetniks attacked German forces near Monastery of Žiča. Several days after the battle began in reprisal for the attack on a German garrison, the German forces committed a massacre of approximately 2,000 civilians in the period between 15 and 20 October, in an event known as the Kraljevo massacre.

On 23 October most of the Partisan forces left the siege of Kraljevo and regrouped their forces to attack Chetniks in Čačak, Užice and Požega. The rebels organized their last larger attack on Kraljevo on 31 October, using two tanks previously captured from German forces, but failed after suffering heavy casualties.

In early November most of the Chetnik forces besieging Kraljevo retreated to reinforce their positions in other towns in Western Serbia attacked by communist forces. On 20 November 1941 both rebel formations signed truce only to be soon again defeated by German offensive in December 1941 that forced Partisans to leave Serbia and Mihailović and his Chetniks to flee constant German chases.

Eventually, Soviet Red Army and Partisan forces captured Kraljevo in autumn 1944, killed at least 240 people in communist purges and established communist regime which lasted for about fifty years. The propaganda created by the winning Partisans was almost completely opposed to real events. The official Partisan historiography considered Chetniks as most responsible for the failed siege, presenting them as deceitful and untrustworthy with minimal combat value. On the other hand, the Partisans were depicted as heroically brave despite all odds at retaking the city.

== Background ==
The attack on Kraljevo was one of the battles waged during the anti-Axis uprising in German-occupied Western Serbia, then part of the Axis occupied Yugoslavia. At the beginning of October 1941 military units of Yugoslav Army in the Fatherland and groups of communist rebels established Operational Headquarters (Serbian: Оперативни штаб) after they first captured German-occupied Čačak. The representatives of the Yugoslav Army in this HQ were Major Radoslav Đurić and Captain Jovan Deroko, while communist representatives were Ratko Mitrović and Momčilo Mole Radosavljević. This Operational Headquarters decided to move their troops toward Kraljevo and prepare to capture it.

== Involved forces ==
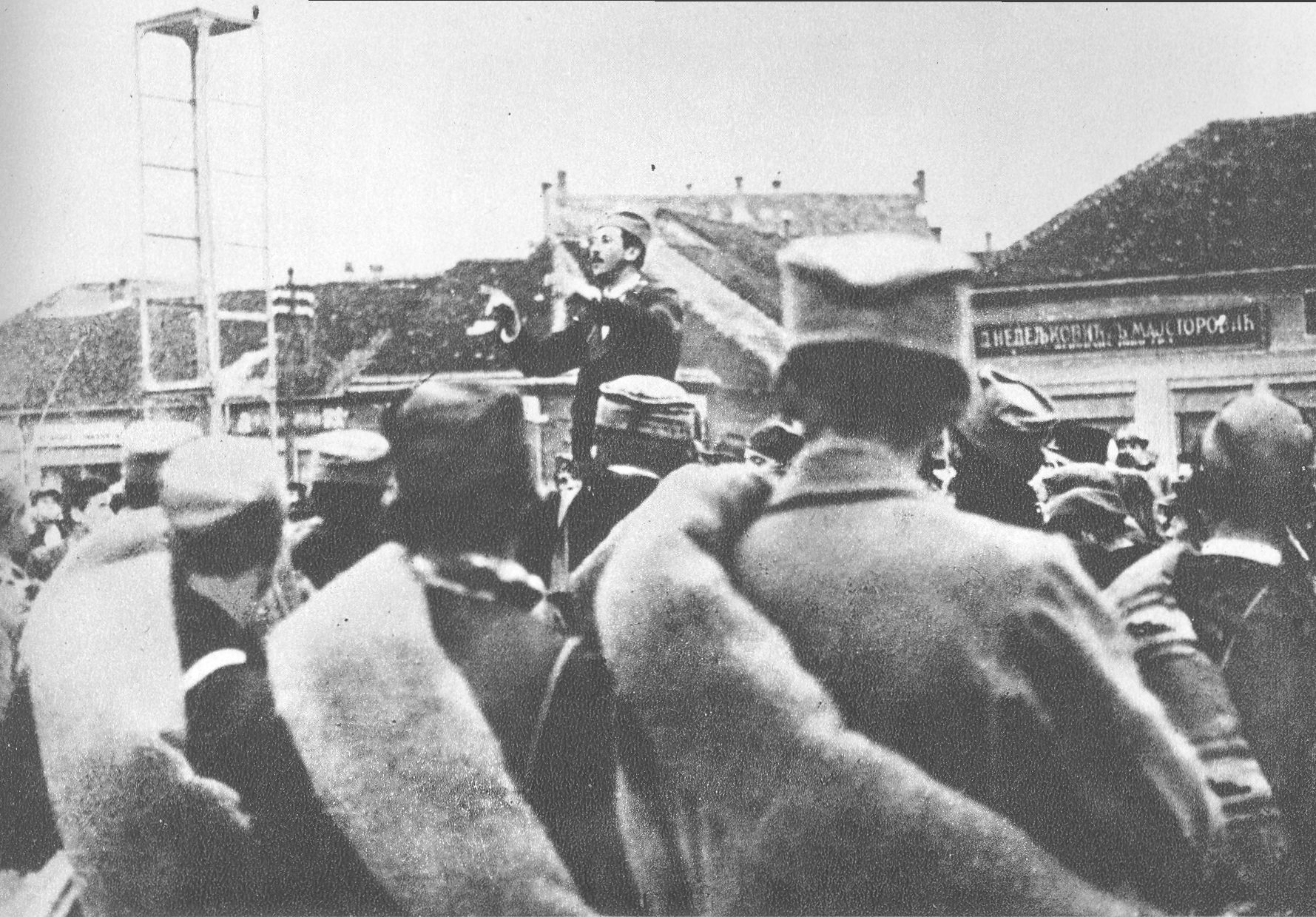
The political commissar of the Čačak partisan detachment, Ratko Mitrović, speaks to the partisan units ahead of their departure to Kraljevo front.

The Yugoslav Army forces were organized in following detachments:

- the Jelica Chetnik Detachment, commanded by Lieutenant Jovan Bojović, an active officer of the Yugoslav Royal Army
- the Bukovik Chetnik Detachment under command of Lieutenant Dušan Đokić
- the Ibar Chetnik Detachment
- the Chetnik Detachment of Death commanded by Simo Uzelac, and
- the Žiča Chetnik Detachment was commanded by Dušan Laušević.

The forces of the Communist Party of Yugoslavia were organized in three units:Dragačevo Battalion, Ljubić Battalion and Jovan Kursula Detachment.

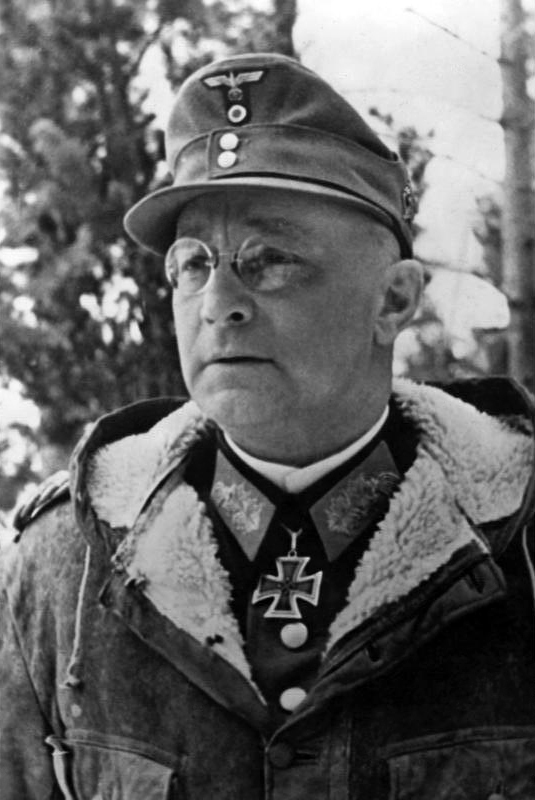
Franz Böhme

== Battle ==
=== Siege ===
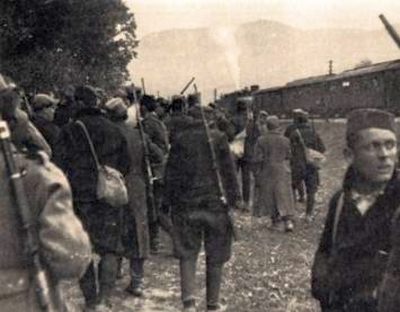
After receiving the weapons from the factory in Užice, the Partisan Battalion of Takovo leaves for the front by train in October 1941.

On 10 October the rebel forces completely surrounded Kraljevo and began its siege. After 45 minutes of artillery barrage, the Jelica Chetnik Detachment commanded by Jovan Bojović on the right wing and Ljubić Partisan Battalion on the left wing attacked North-West German positions in the first hours of 15 October and captured Agriculture School. One platoon of Dragačevo Partisans attacked Kraljevo from the direction of the road toward Raška. After one hour of fighting, rebels reached the court and church buildings in the city center. The German right wing attacked rebels forcing them to retreat and encircling Jelica Chetnik Detachment which was almost completely annihilated. In this battle Jovan Bojović was killed. Miloje Mojsilović succeeded him on the position of commander of Jelica Chetnik Detachment.

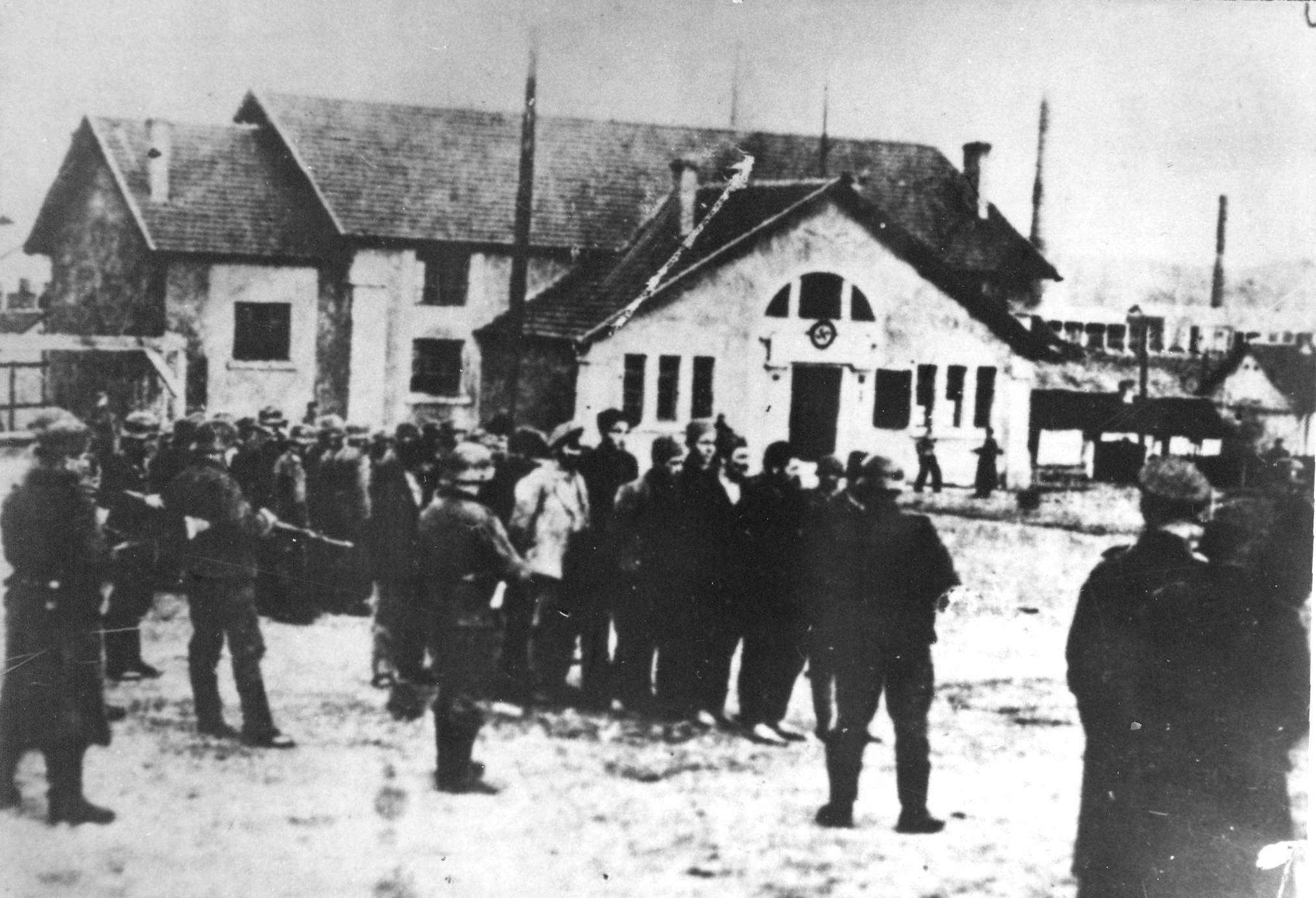
Kraljevo massacre

Between 15 and 20 October 1941 German forces killed approximately 2,000 civilians in reprisal for a joint Partisan–Chetnik attack on a German garrison in an event known as the Kraljevo massacre. On 19 October 1941 Chetnik officer Predrag Raković reported his commander in Čačak, Captain Bogdan Marjanović that his men are disturbed by the news about communist violence in Ljubić county and that they threatened with desertion if this violence continues. The rebel artillery shelled western and central part of the town on 19 and 20 October from Partisan held positions on Ružić hill.

On 28 October 1941 the commander of the Yugoslav Army in the Fatherland Draža Mihailović received an order from Prime Minister of the Yugoslav Government in exile Dušan Simović who adjured Mihailović to eschew premature actions and avoid reprisals. Two German battalions reinforced with two tanks attacked Partisan positions on Ružić hill in early morning of 21 October. The Partisans flee their positions leaving their two cannons on the hill. The German forces continue with their advances through positions deserted by Partisans and attack Chetnik positions killing many Chetnik soldiers before they retreated back to Kraljevo in early afternoon on the same day.

The last larger attack on Kraljevo happened on 31 October 1941 when attacking Partisan and Chetnik forces tried to penetrate German positions and enter into city using two tanks. For some time the historiography attributed this action solely to Partisans, but later this was corrected and participation of Chetniks was recognized. About 130 people died on the rebels' side, both Chetnik and Partisan. During the attack on German positions in the Farming School Chetnik Lieutenant Bojović was killed. Chetnik Lieutenant Sima Uzelac and about a dozen of his soldiers were killed by machine gun while trying to cross barbed wires during their charge on an Axis bunker.

=== Retreat of the Communist forces ===
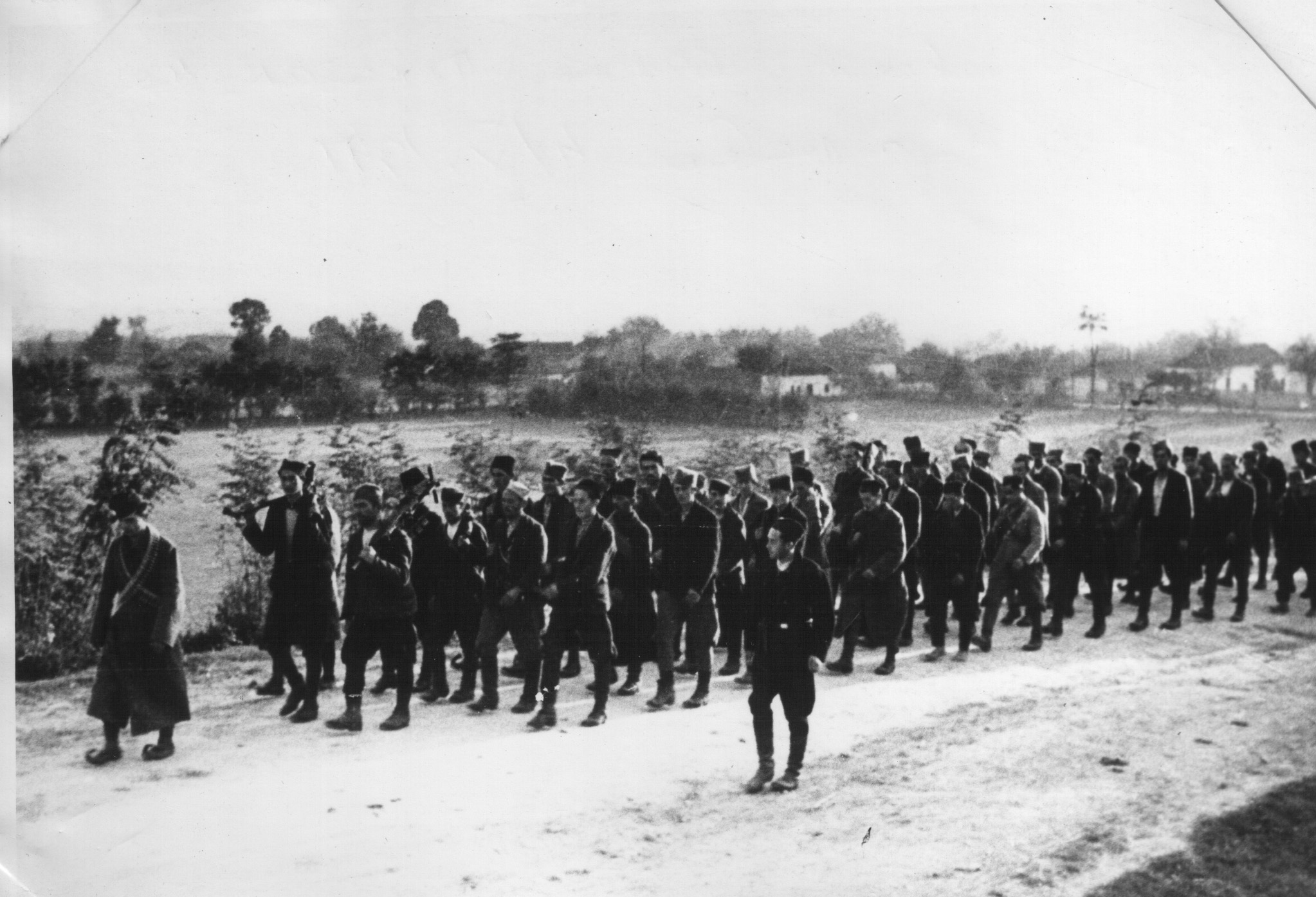
Serbian Partisans of the Trnava Battalion are marching to the siege of Kraljevo.

The Partisans cancelled their attacks on Kraljevo based on the order of the communist supreme command and their headquarters in Serbia. The first units retreating from the siege were communist units, the Dragačevo Battalion which retreated on 23 October and three out of five companies of the Ljubić Battalion retreated before the end of October and sent to Čačak to fight against the Chetnik forces.

=== Conflict among rebels for control over Čačak, Požega and Užice ===
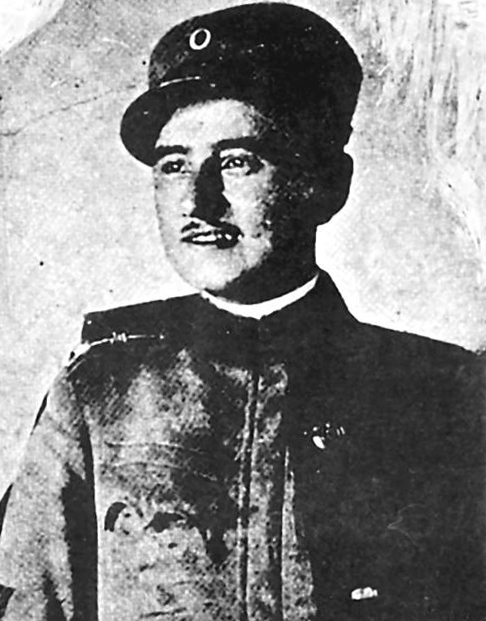
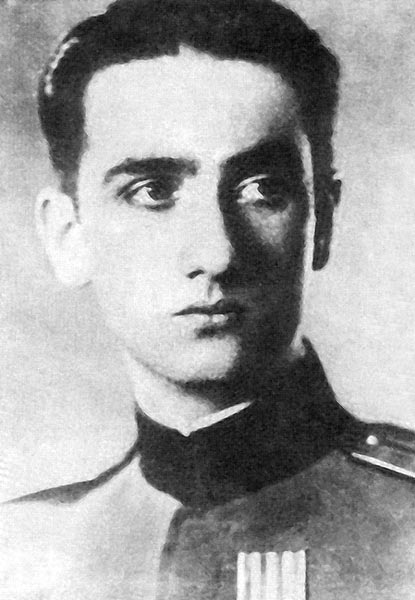
Simo Uzelac (left) who was killed by the Germans and Jovan Deroko (right) whose death at the hands of the Partisans led to an all out Chetnik–Partisan conflict

In the night between 2 and 3 November 1941 the communist commanders forged a plan to attack Požega, after they managed to resist Chetnik attack on their positions in Užice. The information that about 200 Partisans attacked Chetnik security forces of the Preljina airport was quickly reported to Major Đurić who held positions at the Kraljevo siege on the same night.

Draža Mihailović ordered on 5 November to Captain Bogdan Marjanović to intensify his actions and quickly capture Čačak, while Deroko was ordered to contact Marjanović and to take 2/3 his troops, artillery and vehicles to capture Čačak, while rest of his troops were ordered to secure area toward Raška and road between Kraljevo and Čačak.

Not all Chetnik forces left the siege of Kraljevo, but most of Chetniks did leave the siege. Deroko and Chetnik detachment under his command headed toward Čačak through the village of Mrčajevci and easily took over Preljina from Partisans, crossed river Čemernica and positioned his forces that also included artillery on Ljubić hill, near the monument to Tanasko Rajić. The Chetnik Captain Jovan Deroko was commander of the Chetnik artillery on Ljubić. The communist forces forced Chetniks out of Ljubić, captured their artillery and killed Deroko on 6 November 1941.

== Aftermath ==
On 20 November 1941, the communist forces and the Yugoslav Army in the Fatherland signed a truce while the German offensive in December 1941 defeated both parties. The Communists retreated to Montenegro and Bosnia while Mihailović and a small number of his soldiers was forced to flee constant German chases. The Yugoslav Army in the Fatherland and Partisans held each other as morally responsible for Kragujevac and Kraljevo massacres while Mihailović decided to resolve the communist question once for all.

At the beginning of 1942 some Chetniks legalized by the Nedić government buried Deroko besides the grave of Tanasko Rajić in Ljubić, but communists dug out his body in 1945 and disposed of it in an unknown location. Eventually, the Soviet Red Army and the Yugoslav communist forces captured Kraljevo in Autumn 1944 and established a communist regime which lasted for about fifty years. After the communist regime ended the Government of Serbia and its Ministry of Justice established the commission to research atrocities that were committed by members of the Yugoslav Partisan Movement after they gained control over Serbia in Autumn 1944. According to the report of this commission, out of 55,554 registered victims of communist purges in Serbia the new communist regime in Kraljevo killed 240 people while 28 people are missing.

== Historical sources ==
Two different parties that participated in the siege of Kraljevo have opposing and conflicting views on the events. Although both communists and Chetniks bravely fought in this battle, the post-war historiography published by Communist party denied Chetnik contribution labeling them with different defamatory expressions.

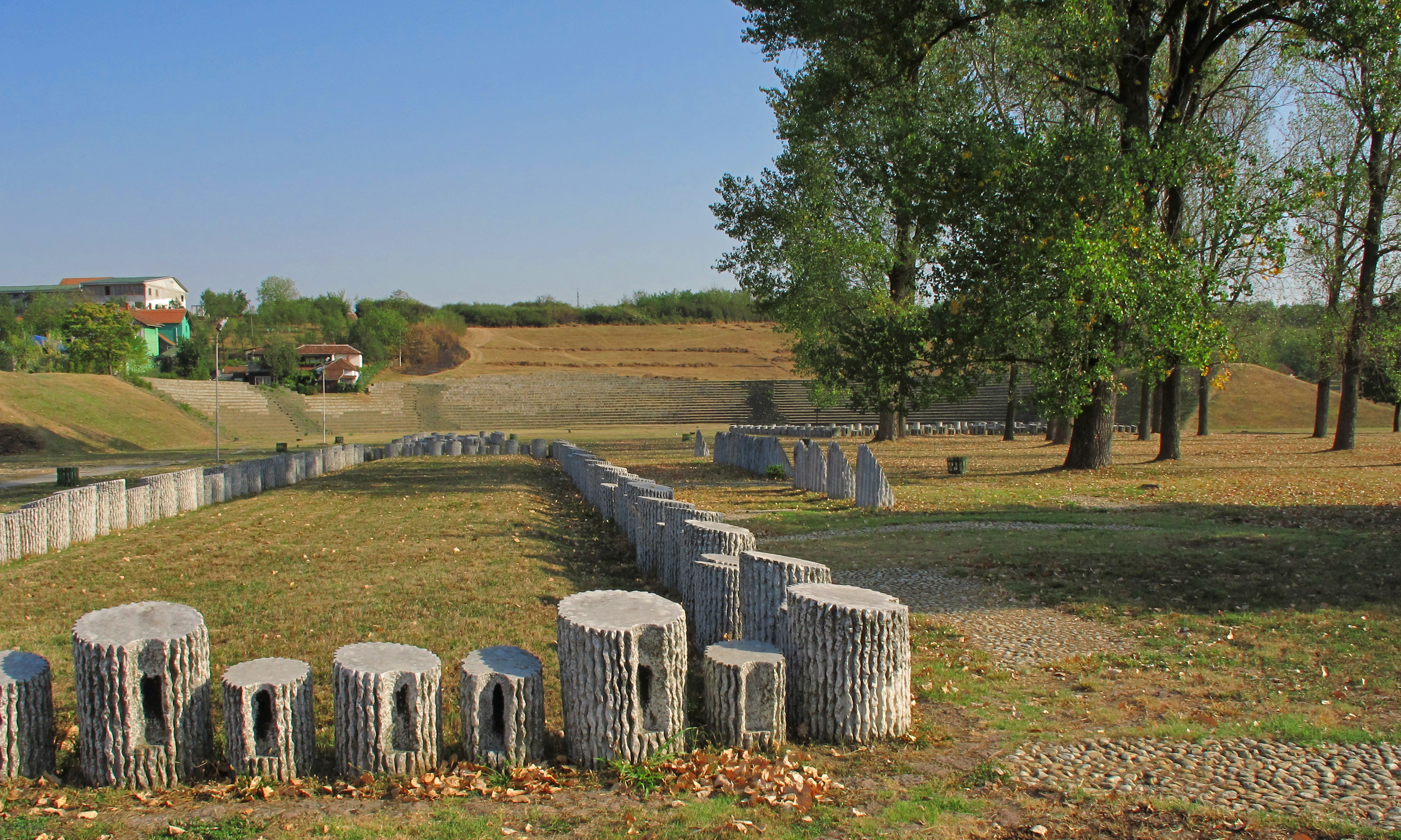
Memorial cemetery Kraljevo October

The propaganda of local historiography created by the winning partisans was service of their communist ideology and presented selected parts of the Siege of Kraljevo to create historical consciousness almost completely opposed to real events. For the half of the century the official historiography considered Chetniks as most responsible for failure and lifting the siege of Kraljevo. The Chetniks were presented as deceitful and untrustworthy whose combat value was minimal, while notable examples of brave individuals which were impossible to ignore were neutralized by exerting the Chetniks' betrayal as their persistent behaviour. The Partisans were depicted as heroically brave with almost perfect characteristics who had a role of Promethean heroes whose enemies, before all Chetniks, were forces whose role was menace. The communist interpretation of the conflict with Yugoslav royalists was symbol of defeat of "counter-revolution", "reaction" and "traitors", particularly because this conflict reached its maximum on 7 November 1941 when communists in Čačak organized celebration of the anniversary of the October Revolution.

In Chetnik interpretation of conflict with Partisans, Deroko received the fame of new Tanasko Rajić. It is important to consider that communists detachment from Čačak left the siege of Požega in period 22–24 October to reinforce communist forces in Užice. Taking in consideration the contemporary situation and conflicts between two rebel groups in Čačak, Požega and Užice, it can be concluded that this broader conflict between two rebel groups caused lifting the siege of Kraljevo.

== Sources ==
- Давидовић, Горан (2001). Чачани на опсади Краљева октобра 1941. године – Хронологија догађаја. Kraljevo: Научни скуп Краљево октобра 1941.
- Давидовић, Горан (2003). "Чачани на опсади Краљева октобра 1941". In Драган Драшковић (ed.). Kraljevo oktobra 1941. - zbornik radova. Радомир Ристић. Народни Музеј Краљево, Историјски Архив Краљево.
- Rudić, Srđan; Pavlović, Lela (1 September 2016). Srpska revolucija i obnova državnosti Srbije: Dvesta godina od Drugog srpskog ustanka: =Serbian Revolution and Renewal of Serbian Statehood: Two Hundred Years since the Second Serbian Uprising. Istorijski institut, Beograd; Međuopštinski istorijski arhiv, Čačak. ISBN 978-86-7743-116-7.
- Đurišić, Mitar (1982). Partizanski odredi u Srbiji 1941. Narodna knjiga.
- Mitrović, Dojčilo (1975). Zapadna Srbija 1941 [i.e. hiljadu devetsto četrdeset prve]. Nolit.
- Vučković, Zvonimir (2004). A Balkan Tragedy – Yugoslavia, 1941–1946: Memoirs of a Guerilla Fighter. East European Monographs. ISBN 978-0-88033-537-9.
- Karchmar, Lucien (1973). Draz̆a Mihailović and the Rise of the C̆etnik Movement, 1941–1942. Department of History, Stanford University.
- Glenny, Misha; Nairn, Tom (1999). The Balkans, 1804–1999: nationalism, war and the great powers. Granta. ISBN 978-1-86207-050-9.
