= Evžen Vohák =

Czech footballer

Personal information
- Date of birth: 15 March 1975 (age 51)
- Place of birth: Czechoslovakia
- Position: Midfielder

Senior career*
Years	Team	Apps	(Gls)
1993	SK České Budějovice	1	(0)
1993–1994	Dukla Prague	12	(0)

International career
1993	Czech Republic U21	1	(0)
- * Club domestic league appearances and goals

Evžen Vohák (born 15 March 1975) is a Czech retired football player who played in the Czech First League for SK České Budějovice and Dukla Prague. He played for amateur side FK Jiskra Třeboň later in his career, leaving after the autumn part of the 2008–09 season.
