= International Philatelic Exhibition, London, 1906 =

The International Philatelic Exhibition was held from 23 May 1906 at the Royal Horticultural Hall, London.

In his opening remarks, recorded in Stanley Gibbons Monthly Journal, Charles Phillips thanked the Prince of Wales for visiting the exhibition and noted that it was about 55 years since the first stamp exhibition had taken place in Brussels in 1852.

At the traditional banquet on 25 May, the usual loyal toasts were made and Mr H.R. Oldfield remarked in his speech upon the international nature of philately and ventured to prophesy that philately would be prosperous when Esperanto had been forgotten. He also noted the presence of ladies, for the first time, at the event.

== Medals ==
The exhibition was notable for having a special class of awards for exhibits by ladies, the gold medal in that class going to Mrs E.B.S. Benest for her Brazil and the silver to Mrs Herxheimer for her general collection from 1890.

The Earl of Crawford won the Championship Cup for his Great Britain, while gold medals were awarded to Leslie L. R. Hausburg for his Victoria, to Baron Anthony de Worms for his Ceylon, Vernon Roberts for his Cape of Good Hope and a number of others.
