= Aleksandar Deroko =

Serbian architect (1894–1988)

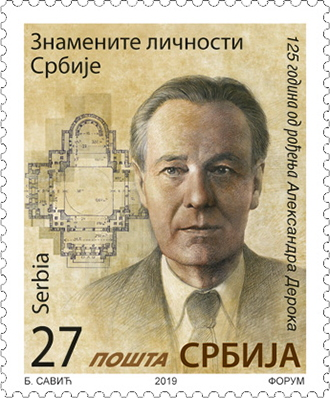
- Born: 4 September 1894; Belgrade, Serbia
- Died: 30 November 1988 (aged 94); Belgrade, SR Serbia, Yugoslavia
- Occupation: Architect

Aleksandar Deroko (Serbian Cyrillic: Александар Дероко; 4 September 1894 – 30 November 1988) was a Serbian architect, artist, and author. He was a professor of the Belgrade University and a member of the Serbian Academy of Sciences and Arts.

== Biography ==
His great-grandfather was a Venetian named Marco de Rocco, who moved to Dubrovnik (in the Kingdom of Dalmatia) and married a local woman. Aleksandar's grandfather, Jovan, came to Belgrade to be an art teacher. On his maternal side, his great-uncle was Jovan Đorđević (1826–1900), the founder of the Serbian National Theatre in Novi Sad. Deroko was also related to the famous Serbian writer Stevan Sremac (1855–1906).

During his childhood years, his family lived in his great-uncles' house at Knez Mihailova Street, in the center of Belgrade. He was not a very good student in elementary and secondary school, in fact he barely managed to graduate. As he said in his biography, he preferred boating on the river Sava to studying. Before World War I, he enrolled at the Technical Faculty of the University of Belgrade.

=== World War I ===
In the beginning of the war he volunteered in the artillery, but was transferred to Skoplje to join the battalion of 1300 Corporals and was made a sergeant. As he was an aeronautical pioneer before the war, he was transferred to the newly formed Royal Serbian Air Force. He was sent to France for training in the 1915, and thus escaped the Serbian retreat in the autumn and winter of that year. His squadron joined the recovered Serbian army on the Salonika front, where he fought until the end of the war and the liberation of Serbia.

=== Professional life ===
He studied architecture in Rome, Prague, Brno and he graduated in Belgrade in 1926. With a French government scholarship he studied in Paris, where he made friends with Picasso, Sava Šumanović, Rastko Petrović, Le Corbusier and others who then lived in Paris. In the early 1930s he became a full professor at the Architectural Faculty in Belgrade. He taught Medieval and Byzantine architecture. He made a project, along with the Nikola Nestorović, for the Temple of Saint Sava in that period, and in the 1935 the work on it began. He was an author of many books, most famously Medieval Castles on the Danube (1964) and Mischiefs around Kalemegdan (1987). Beside architecture he made illustrations on his personal postcards, created in the period when his diligent and wearisome architectural activity finally subsided somewhat, demonstrate the energetic Belgrade atmosphere, conviviality, eroticism, in a word – all the liberalism of the new educated middle class.

== Selected works ==
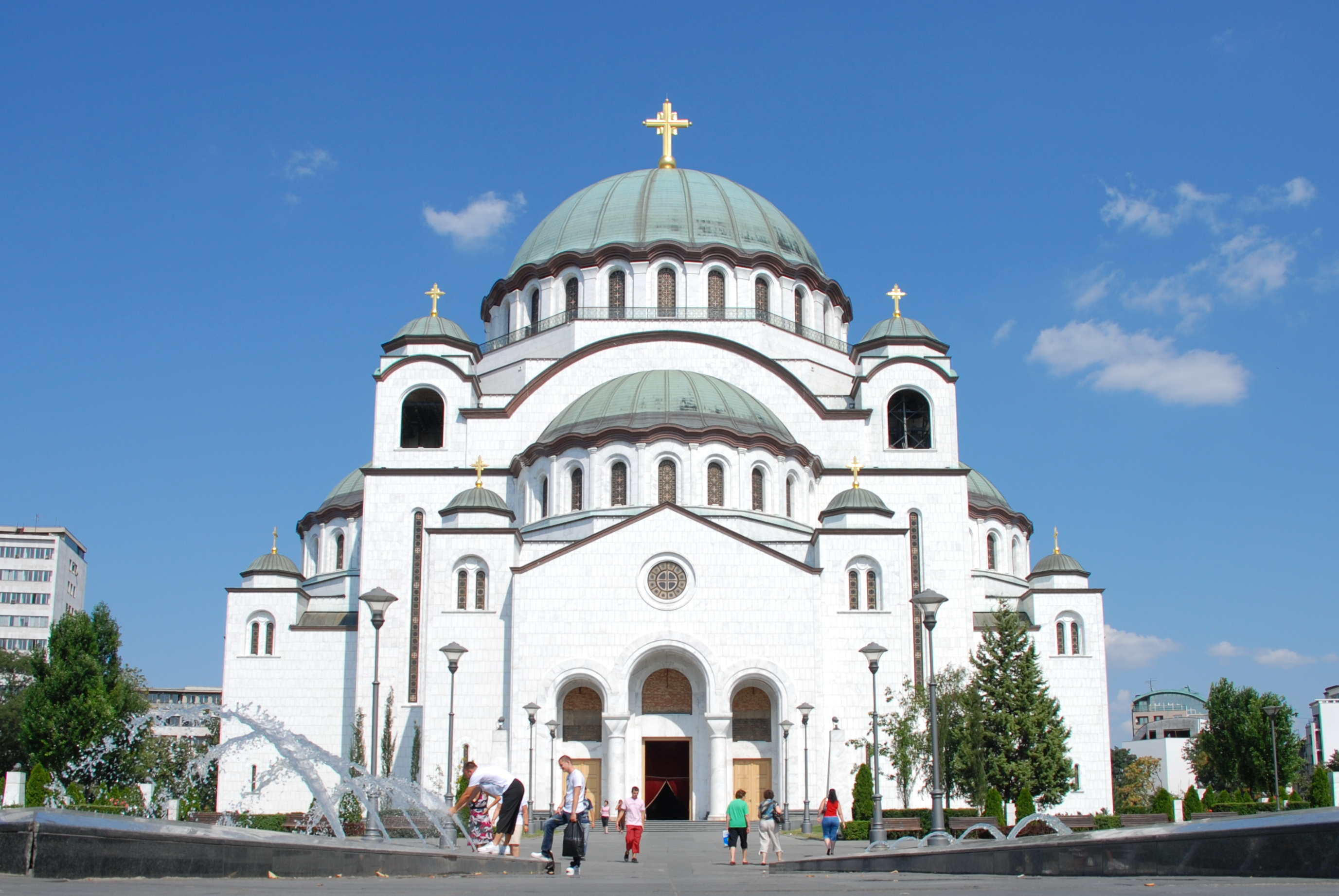
Cathedral of Saint Sava, Belgrade

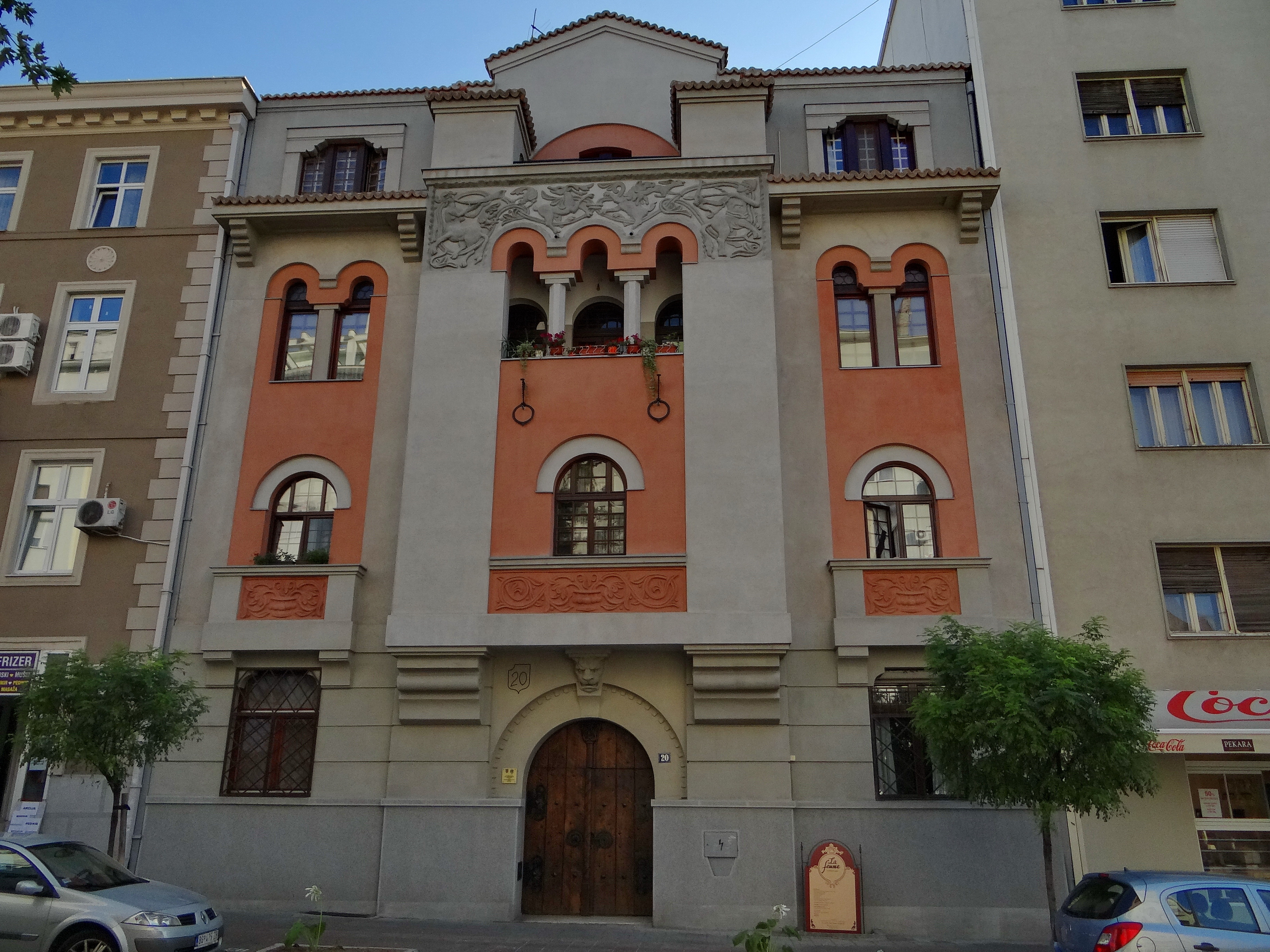
House of coronel Elezović in Njegoševa street, Belgrade

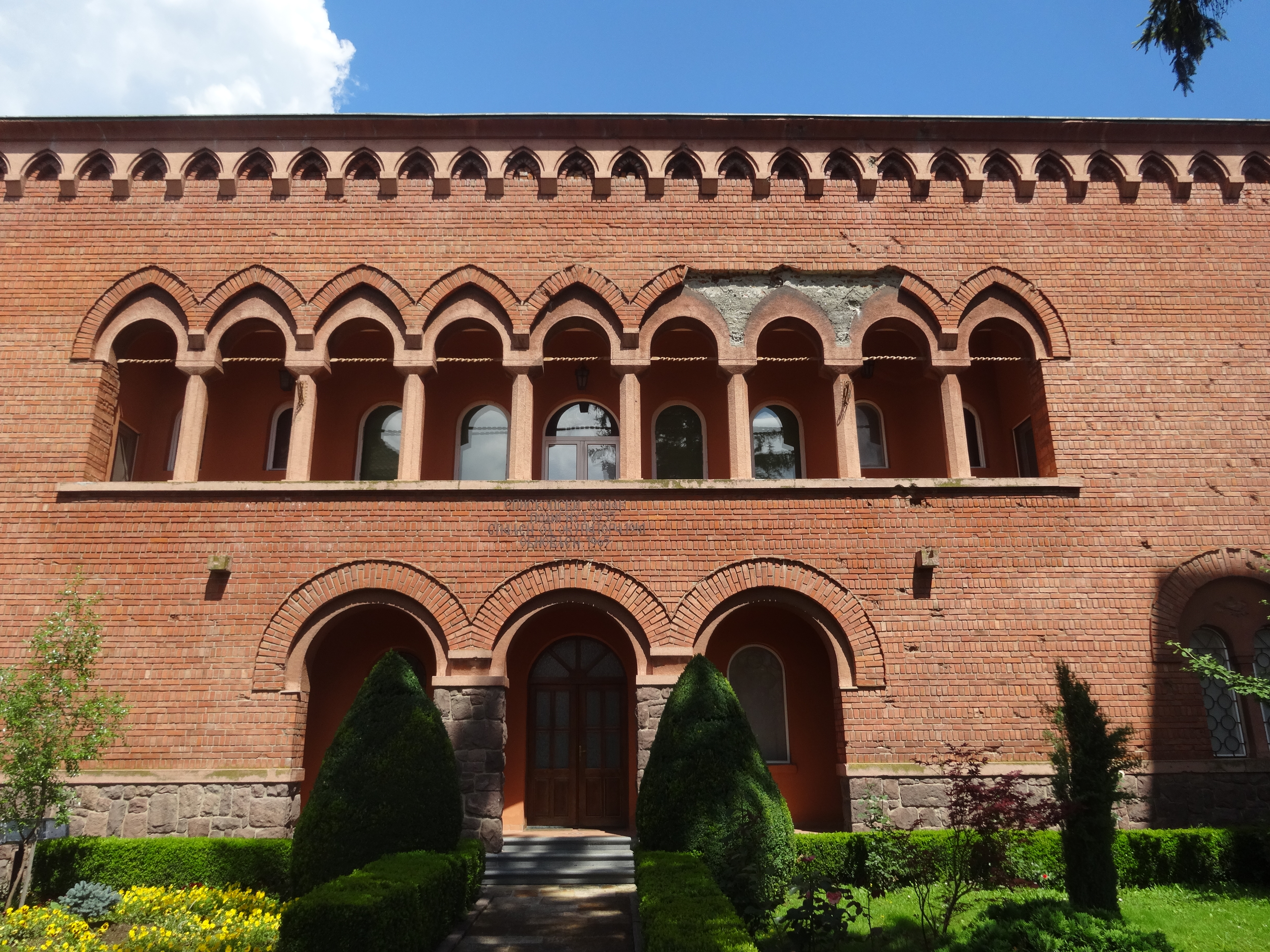
Residence in the Žiča monastery

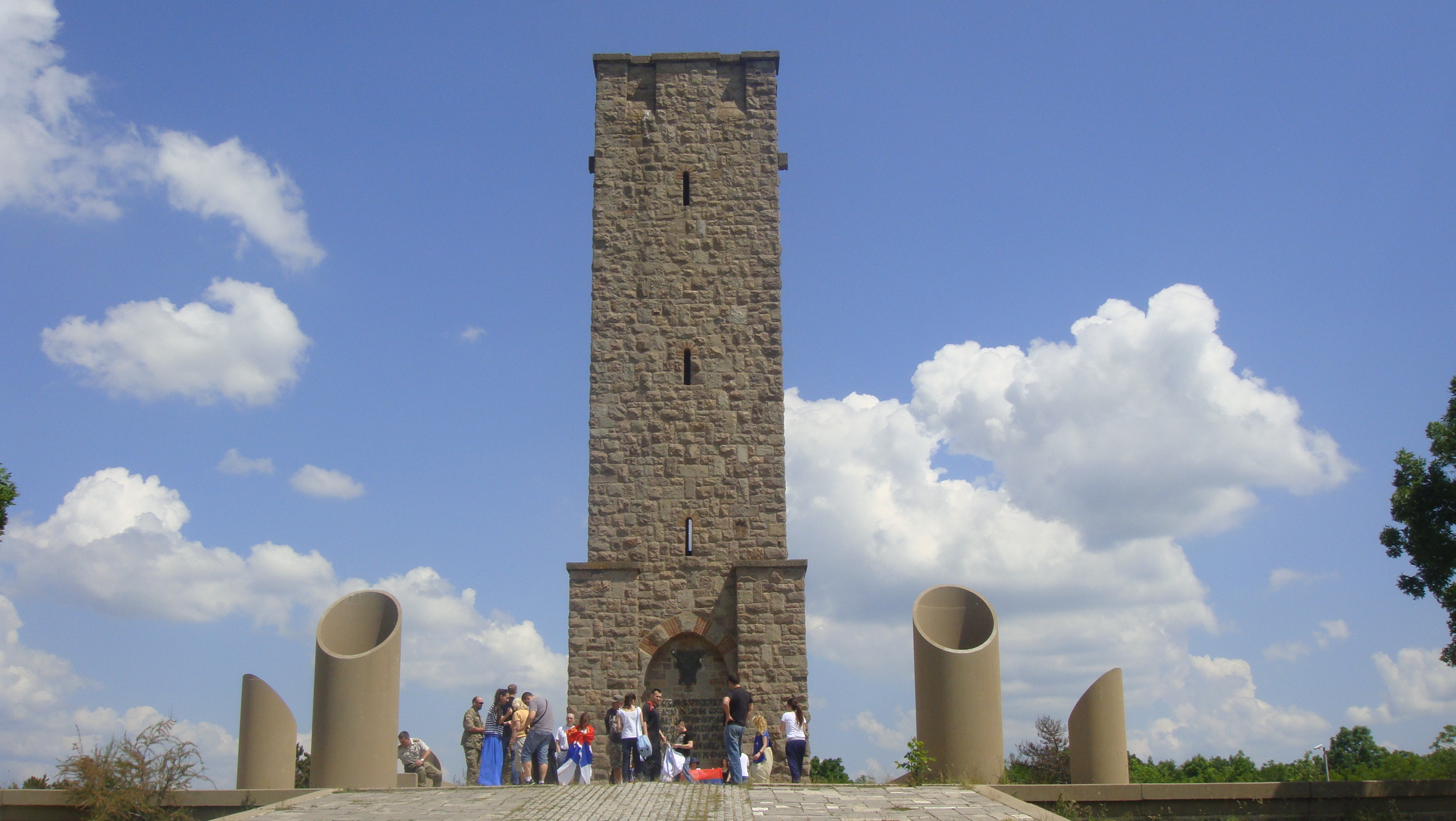
Gazimestan monument

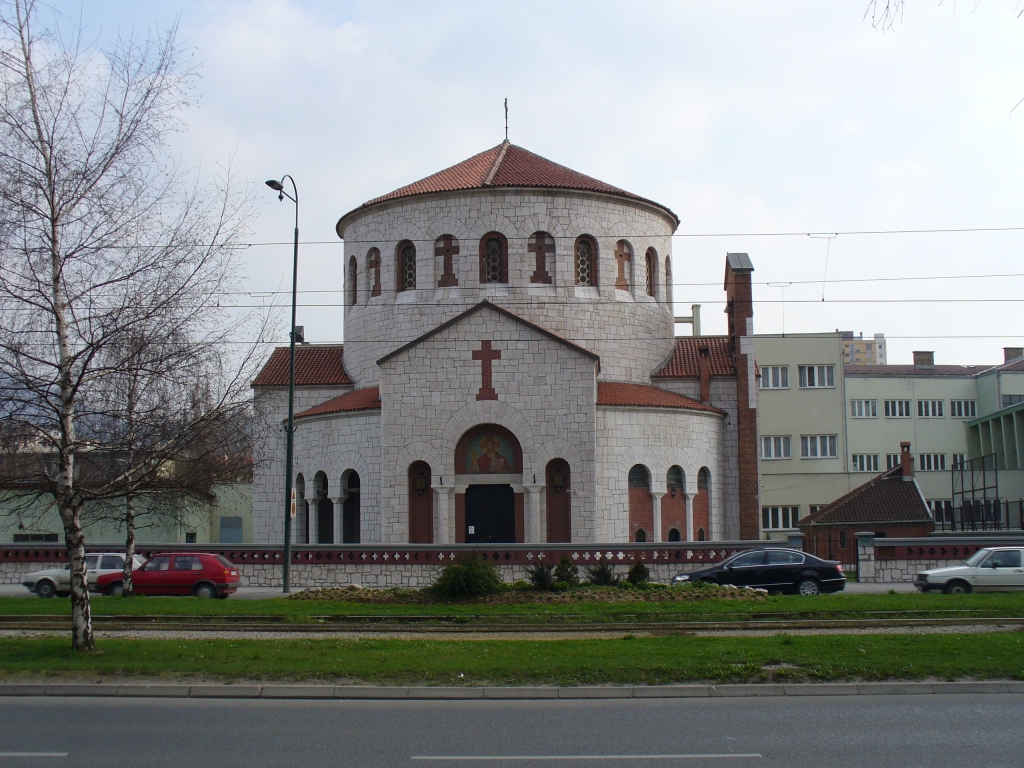
Church of the Holy Transfiguration, Novo Sarajevo

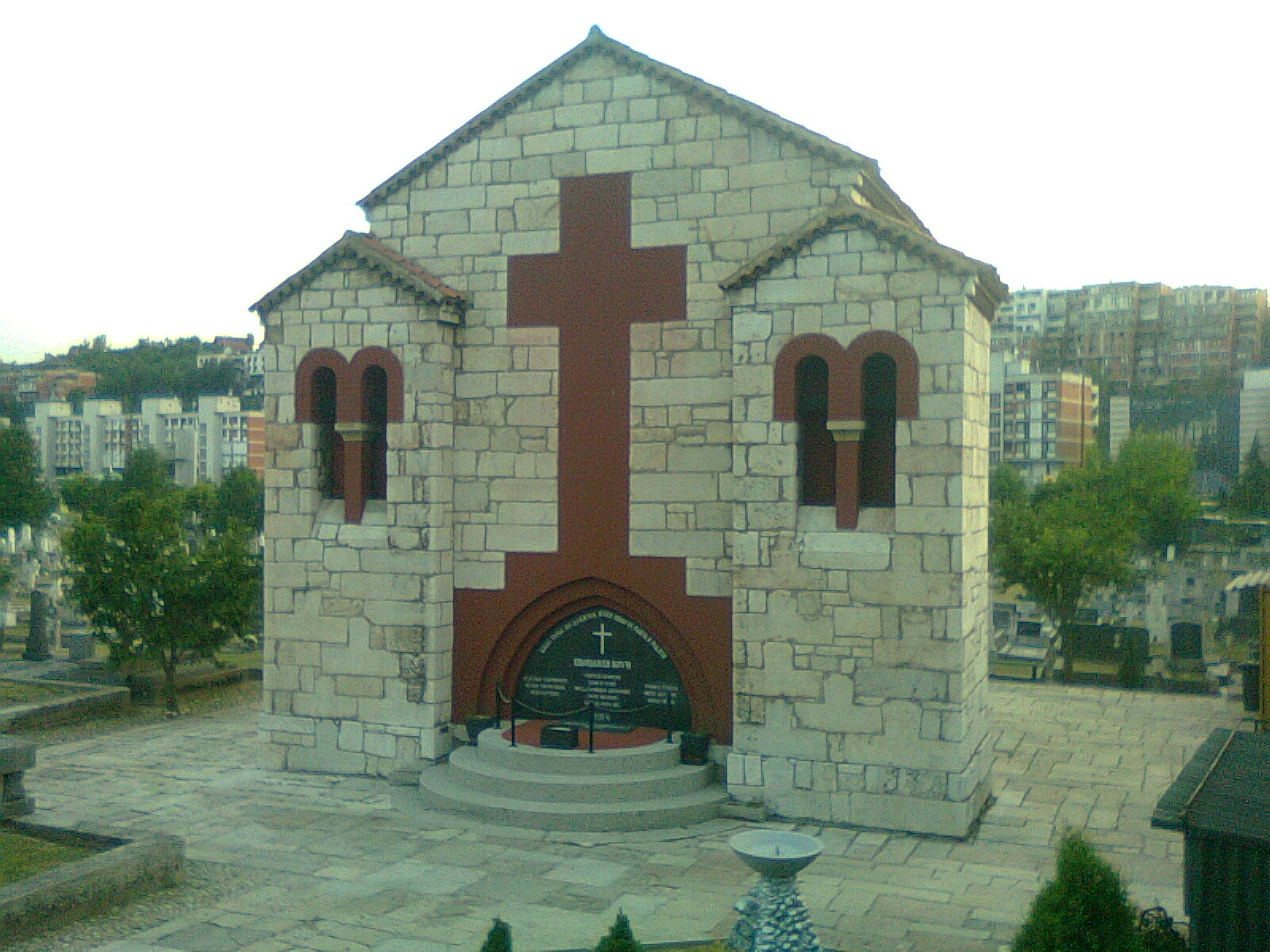
Chapel of Vidovdan Heroes, Sarajevo
